= Miler =

Miler may refer to:

== Given name ==
- Miler Magrath (1523–1622), Irish priest and archbishop born in County Fermanagh, Ireland
- Miler O'Higgin (died 1590), Irish Roman Catholic clergyman

== Surname ==
- Johnny Miler (1910–1976), United States Olympic boxer
- Phil Miler, Brazilian actor and an internationally awarded voice actor
- Zdeněk Miler (1921–2011), Czech animator and illustrator

== Industry ==
- Miler Coaster, a family-owned roller coaster manufacturing firm based in Portland, Oregon, United States
- Prince Miler, medium-sized pickup truck built by the Prince Motor Company

== Others ==
- Miler language, a language spoken in central Nigeria

== See also ==
- Mailer (disambiguation)
- Miller
- Miller's (disambiguation)
- Millers (disambiguation)
- Millery (disambiguation)
- Smiler (disambiguation)
