= Mailer =

Mailer may refer to:

- Email marketing
- Mass mailer, a computer worm that spreads itself via e-mail
- Mailer (occupation), an individual employed to handle newspapers from the press to the truck.
- Mailer (surname)
- Padded envelope

== See also ==
- Mail carrier
- E-mailer
- Central Mailer (disambiguation)
- Mailer-Daemon
