= Nissan Caball =

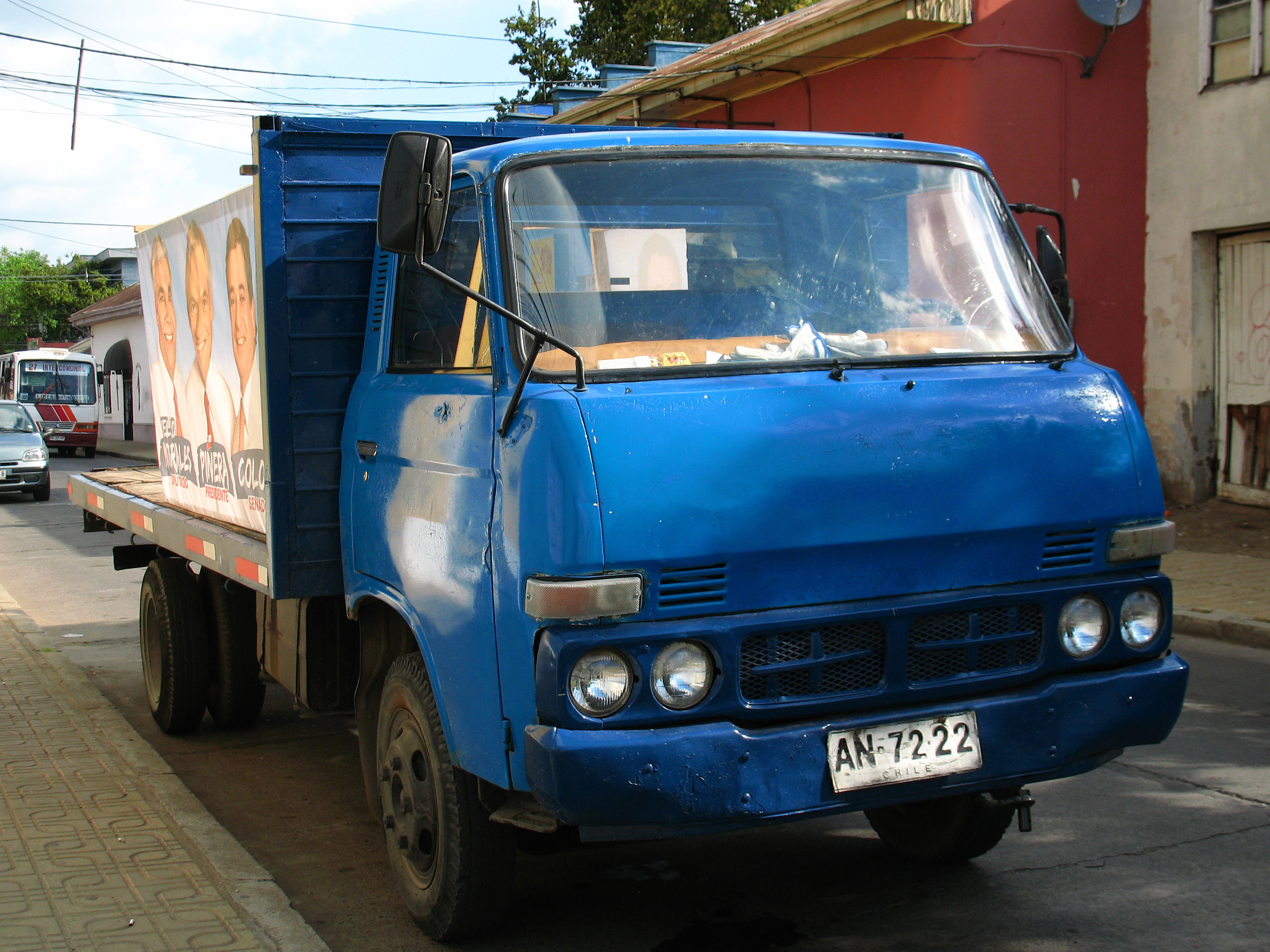
- 1982 Nissan Caball

Overview
- Manufacturer: Nissan
- Production: 1957–1983

Body and chassis
- Class: Medium-duty truck
- Layout: Front-engine, rear-wheel-drive

Chronology
- Predecessor: Nissan Type 80
- Successor: Nissan Atlas

The Nissan Caball is a light commercial truck manufactured by Nissan Motors from December 1957 until December 1981. The Caball was mainly sold in Japan, Hong Kong, South East Asian countries, Australia, New Zealand, and few European countries and shared the Nissan Junior platform. While the Caball name came to an end in 1981 with the cancellation of the Junior, its larger replacement received the Nissan Atlas name in the domestic Japanese market (Cabstar in the export). These are 2–4 ton trucks, the lighter versions in the Atlas truck range took over after the lesser Cabstar/Homer. In Japan, it was available at Nissan Store locations and replaced by the Nissan Atlas.

== Nissan Type 80 ==
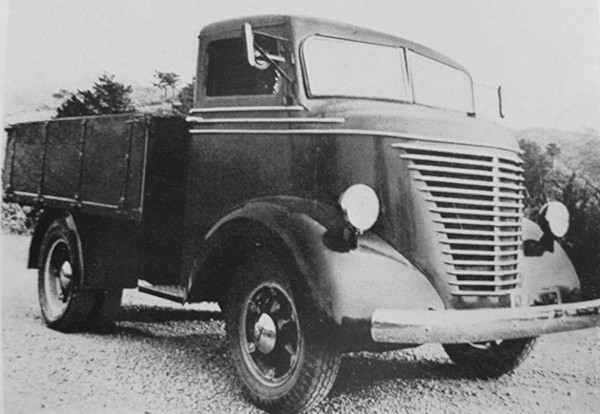
A Nissan Type 80 truck

The "Type 80" was the first cab-over truck that Nissan produced. It was built between 1937 and 1941, during the time when Nissan was under a joint venture with American Graham-Paige. Thus, the Type 80 shared a modified version of the chassis from the Nissan Type 70 sedan (A copy of the Graham-Paige Crusader) but was lengthened and made heavier. Its cab design was patterned after the Federal COE truck of the same period.

As it was a truck, the Graham-Paige rear axle was not enough to support the payload the truck was going to be subjected to (around 2-3 tons) so it was replaced by a locally built heavy-duty rear axle. Apart from the standard platform truck, it was also available in many other body styles such as a van, fire truck and bus. The truck was utilized by the military during the Second World War, alongside other models from Toyota and Mitsubishi.

Nissan would not produce another cab-over truck until 1957.

== First generation (C40) ==
First appearing in December 1957, the Nissan Junior Caball began as a cab-over version of the B40-series Nissan Junior. Like the Junior, the Junior Caball used the 1.5 L (1,489 cc) "1H" four-cylinder engine, developing 50 PS (37 kW) at 4,400 rpm. In August 1958 the C42 version was released (the C41 designation was skipped), with power up to 57 PS (42 kW). The C43 was released in 1959 with a new grille design that was larger and filled the space between the headlights. The cabin air intake used on the C40 and C42 was gone, with cabin air directed through the grille itself. Also gone was the interior floor hump, the C43 now featured a flat cabin floor in front of the seat. The cabover approach was used because of Japanese Government dimension regulations, which dictate how long a vehicle can be and how wide so as to stay within favorable annual road tax obligations.

== Second generation (C140) ==
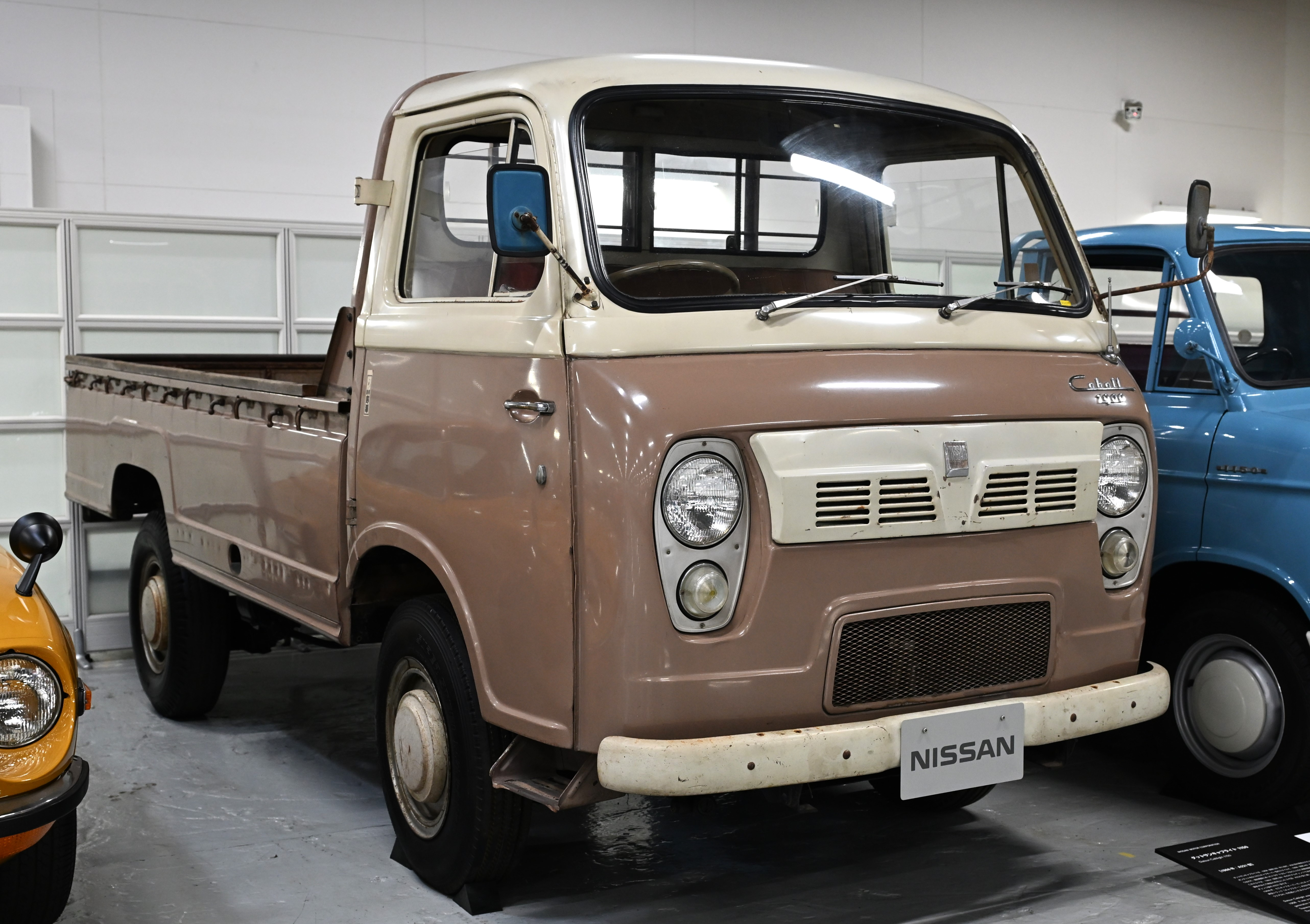
1963 Nissan Caball (C141)

The C140 was introduced in April 1960 and continued in production until replaced by the C240 series six years later. While almost identical in appearance to the C40, it featured an all-new 1.5-litre G-series engine also seen in the Cedric. Power was up to 71 PS (52 kW) at 5,000 rpm. There was also a bus version called the Echo (GC140), which was introduced a month before the Caball. This was the first Caball to see export markets outside of Asia, reaching a certain level of success in Australian and Central American markets. There were also VC140 (van) and KC140 (microbus) versions available.

In 1962 the C141 Caball was introduced, which is when the "Junior" part of the name was dropped and the truck simply became the "Nissan Caball". Like the C40 and C140, the C141 is based on the Junior 40 pickup. While the 1.5-litre "G" engine remained available, the main engine was now the 1,883 cc H engine, offering 85 PS (63 kW). In 1963 the Caball underwent a major change, with the front sheetmetal replaced and with a more bulging, "droopy-eyed" appearance. There was also a QC141 version available, featuring a 2,164 cc SD22 diesel engine producing 70 PS (51 kW). Now based on the Junior 41 pickup, the C142 was released in late 1965 with few changes from the C141, with the "1900" badge replaced with a "2000" badge. The grille and mirrors were also different. The G and H engines were replaced by the 1,982 cc H20 engine, with 99 hp (74 kW). This was the last Nissan vehicle where the doors were hinged at the rear.

== Third generation (C240) ==
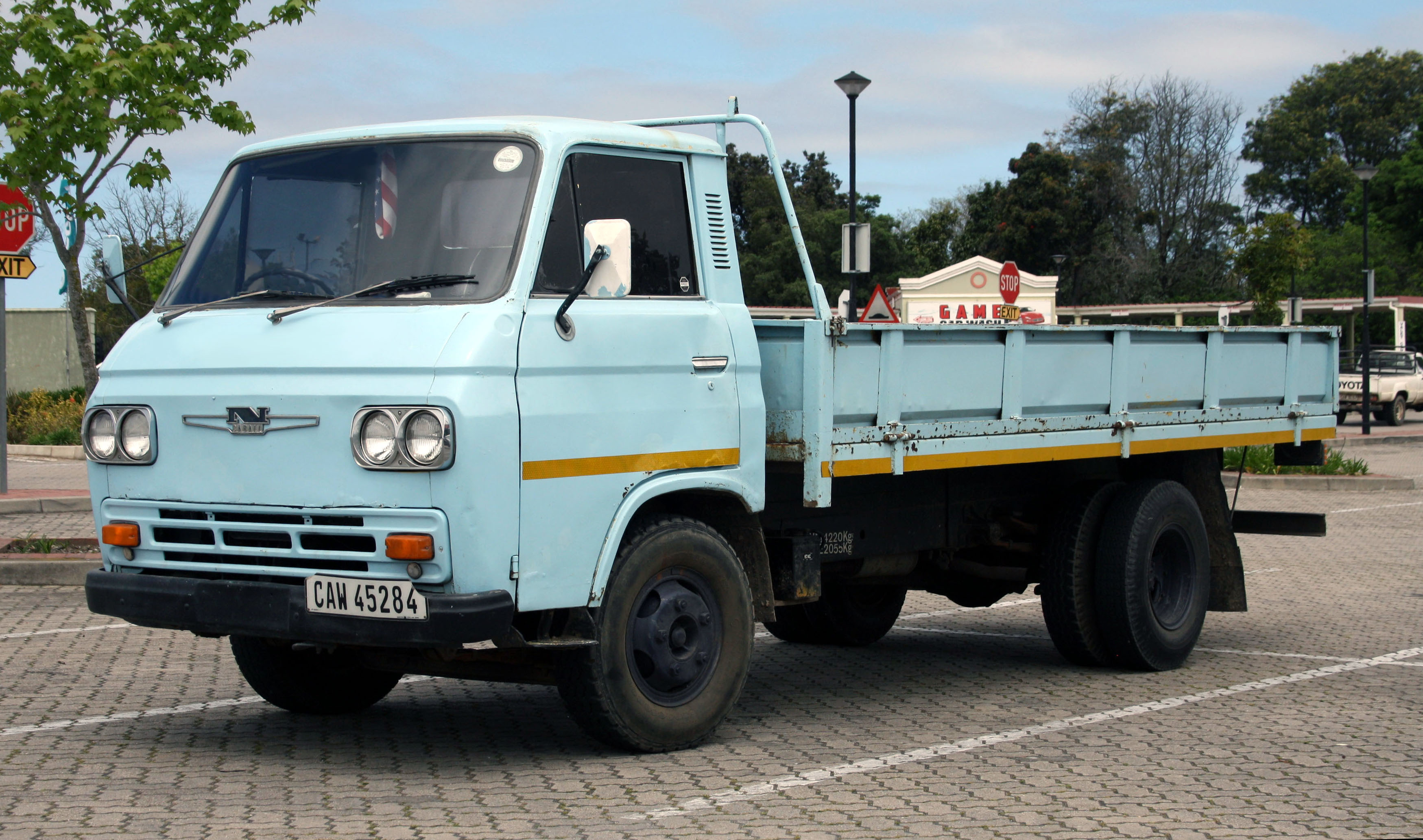
Nissan Caball C240 (South Africa)

The third generation Caball first appeared in August 1966. The exterior was redesigned with a more modern look with quad headlights, and for the first time, front-hinged doors. The interior was designed for Americans in mind, and could comfortably seat three even though it wasn't sold in North America. The C240 used the same engines as the C142. In 1969, the grille was changed. The badge on the front featured a wing-shape with a huge letter "N" in the middle and "Caball" in smaller writing below the N (this badge is similar to the one used on the C80). On the passenger side just above the headlight was a "G4" badge (gas model) or a "D4" badge (diesel model). The "Echo" bus version (GC240) was also available.

== Fourth generation (C340) ==
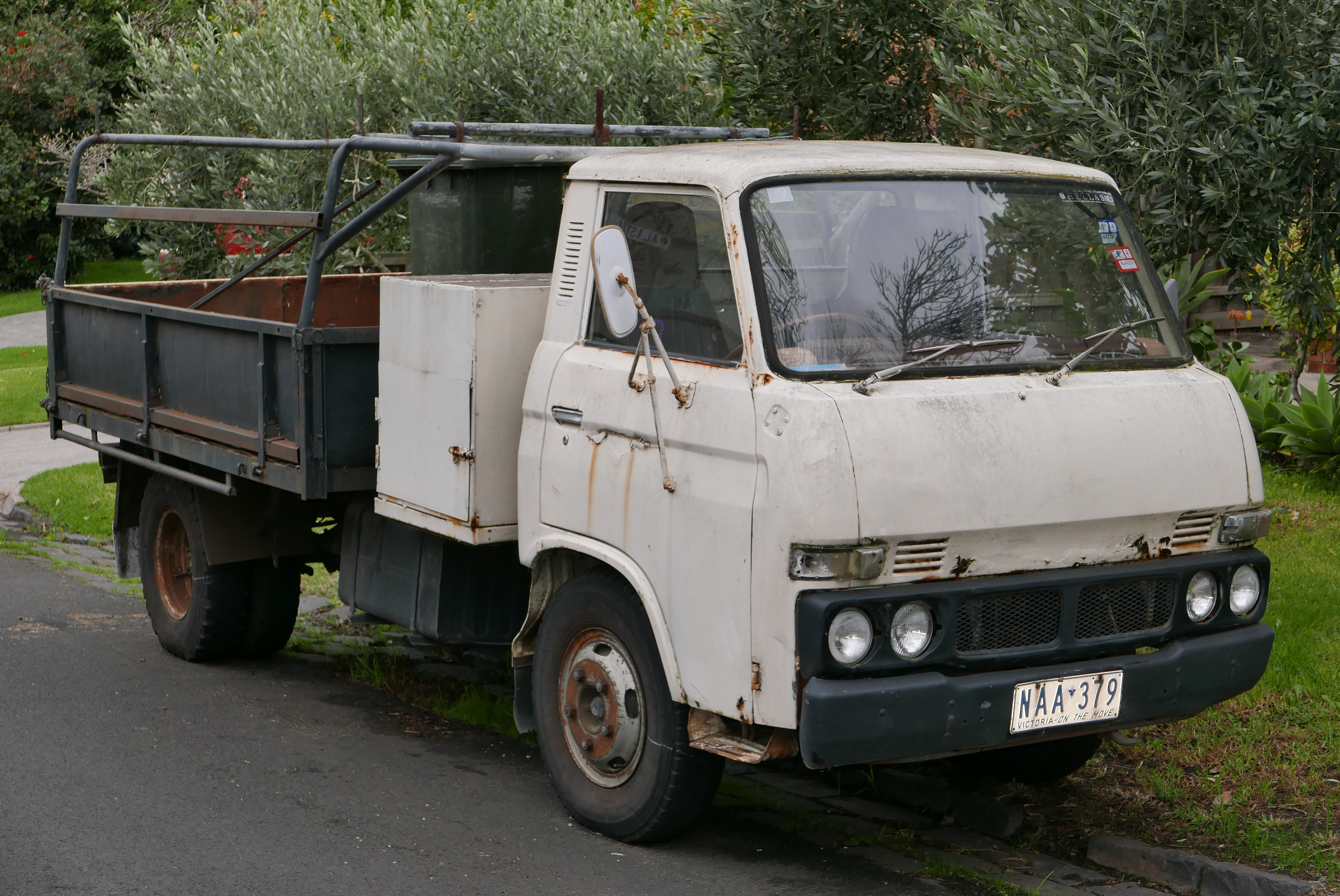
1981 Nissan Caball (C340) truck (Australia)

The fourth and last generation Caball was introduced in May 1976 and was discontinued without a direct successor in late 1981. This generation was also marketed as the Nissan Clipper, a nameplate acquired with Nissan's takeover of the Prince Motor Company. The Clipper was sold through Prince stores, while the Caball was sold through the Nissan Motor sales network. Between 1979 and 1981 Nissan Diesel (UD) also had a version called the Bison, sold through their stores. The C340 used the cab and chassis of the preceding C240, but received a different front treatment and was somewhat longer. This model was also assembled in South Africa. Engines were the trusty two-liter H20 and the three-liter ED30 diesel. Power outputs are 72 and 63 kW (98 and 86 PS; 97 and 84 hp) respectively. In June 1980 the larger ED33 diesel arrived, with glowplugs for increased ease of operations and afterglow to help lower pollution.

== See also ==
- Nissan Junior
- Prince Clipper
- Nissan Atlas
