= Nissan Junior =

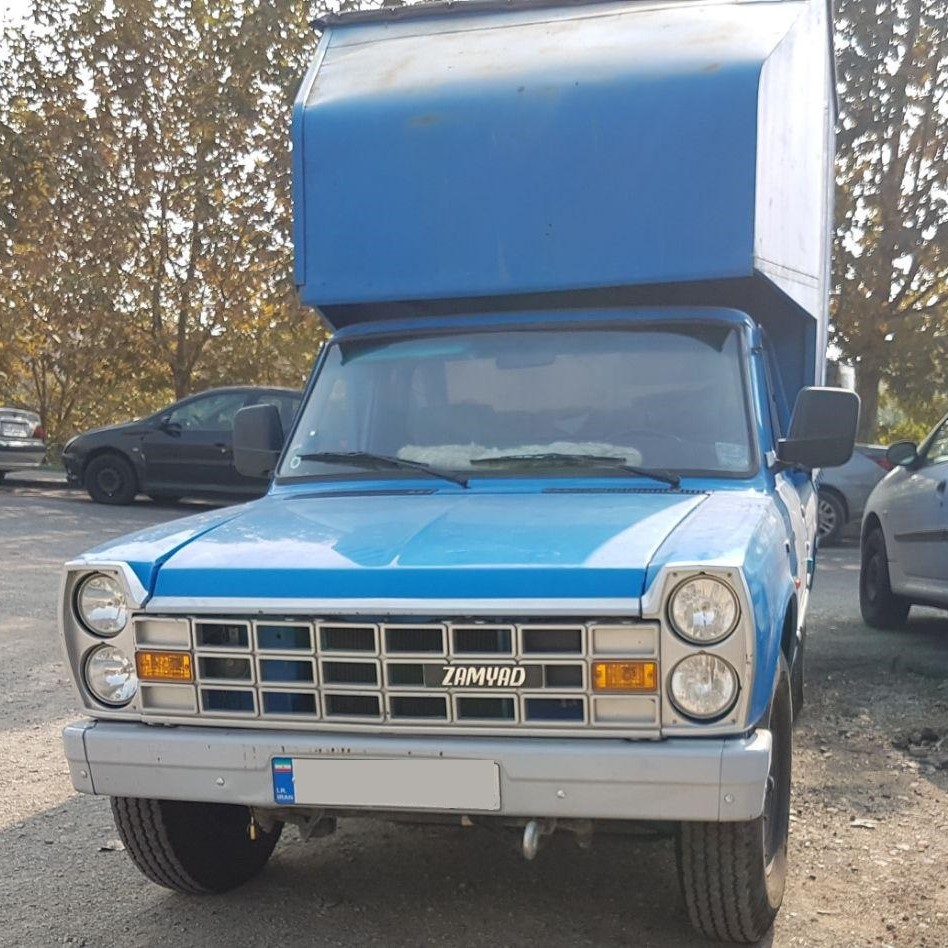
- Zamyad Z24, Iranian-built variant of Nissan Junior 140

Overview
- Manufacturer: Nissan (Nissan Shatai); Zamyad
- Production: 1956–1982 (Japan); 1970–present (Iran)
- Assembly: Yokosuka, Kanagawa Japan; Zamyad Iran

Body and chassis
- Layout: Front engine, rear-wheel drive

Chronology
- Successor: Nissan Atlas/Cabstar; Datsun 720; Zamyad Padra+

The Nissan Junior was a series of medium-sized pickup trucks built from 1956 until 1982. It was introduced to fill the gap between the smaller, Datsun Bluebird based Datsun Truck, and heavier load capacity Nissans under the Nissan Diesel brand, like the 80-series trucks. After the merger with Prince Motor Company, the Junior and the Prince Miler were combined, sharing most of the characteristics, with the Junior sold at Nissan Store Japanese dealerships, and the Miler sold at Nissan Prince Store until 1970.

While the smaller Datsun Truck always outsold the Toyota Hilux, the larger Junior was outsold by the Toyota Stout. This may have been due to the decision to market it under the unfamiliar Nissan name, as well as "Junior" not being a very suitable name for a large, heavier payload truck. Since 1970, Zamyad (nowadays a SAIPA subsidiary) assembles it in Iran, where it was released under the name of Nissan Zamyad. In 1986, SAIPA took over its production and it was released under the name of SAIPA 24. In 1998, the Zamyad company once again took over production under the Zamyad Z24 name.

== First generation ==
Nissan Junior
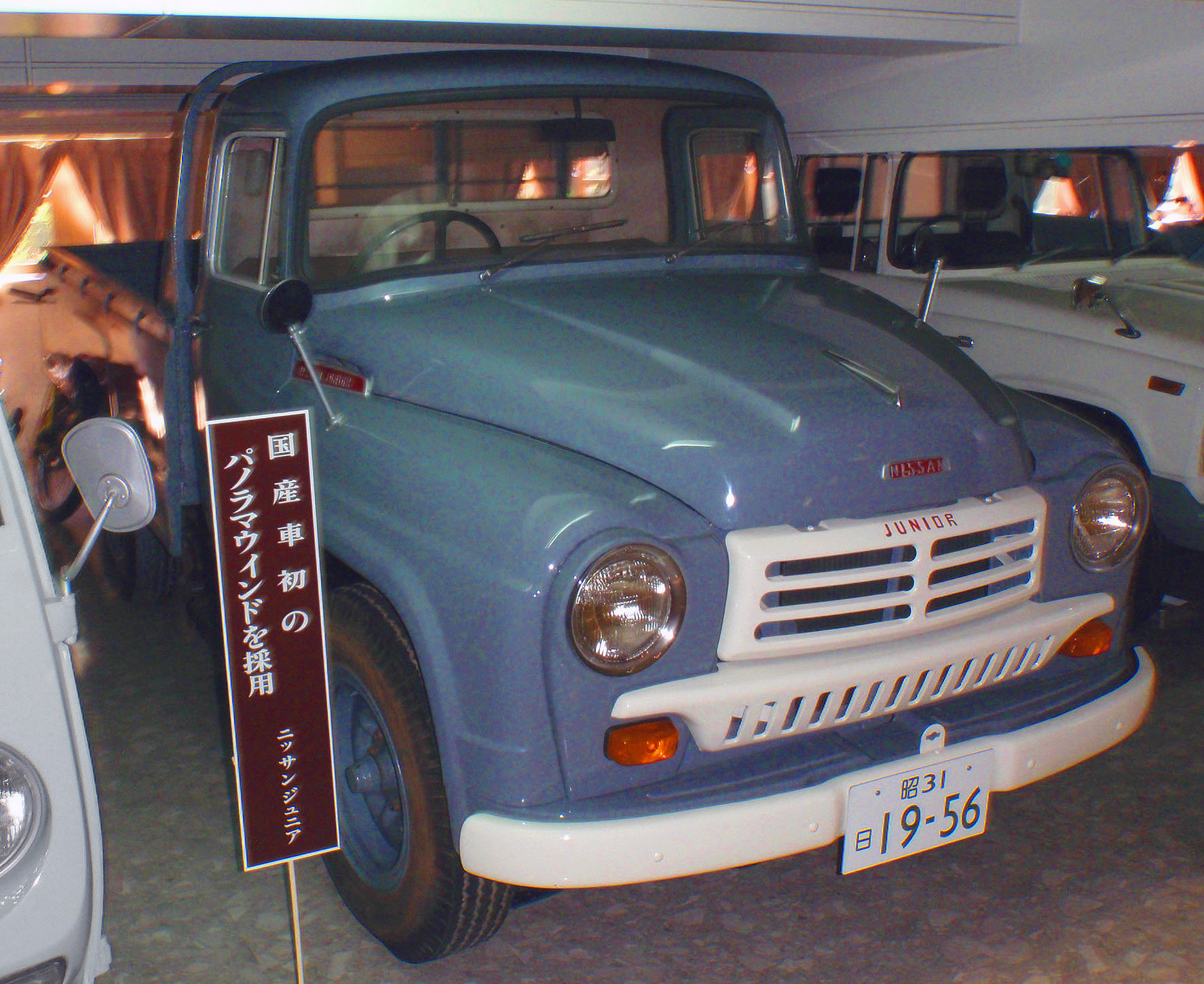
- 1956 Nissan Junior (B40)

Overview
- Manufacturer: Nissan

Body and chassis
- Layout: FR layout
- Related: Nissan Caball

Powertrain
- Engine: 1.5L 1H I4; 1.5L G I4; 1.9L H I4
- Transmission: 4-speed manual

Dimensions
- Wheelbase: 2,500 mm (98 in)
- Length: 4,290 mm (169 in)
- Width: 1,675 mm (66 in)
- Height: 1,820 mm (72 in)
- Curb weight: 1,475 kg (3,252 lb)

=== B40 (1956–1960) ===
The B40 Junior was launched in October 1956 as a medium-size truck which could carry a 1.75-ton load and three passengers. Wheelbase was 2,500 mm (98 in). While not as space efficient as a cabover, the bonneted layout provided a considerably better ride. There was also a VB40 Van version offered. The B40 used Nissan's 1.5 L (1,489 cc) "1H" four-cylinder engine. In December 1957, a cabover version of the Junior appeared, the Junior Caball, with chassis code C40. It was available at Nissan Store locations.

At first it had 50 PS (37 kW) at 4,400 rpm, which was enough for a 90 km/h (56 mph) top speed, but in August 1958 the B42-series (the B41 designation was skipped) was introduced, with 57 PS (42 kW) on tap. At the same time, the cabover Junior Caball underwent the same change, becoming the C42.

Various special versions of the first Juniors, such as a panel van, a glazed van (VSB42), a tank truck, and a vacuum car (EGB42) were also offered.

=== B140 (1960–1962) ===
While retaining the looks of the B40-series, featuring only a changed grille and a somewhat longer wheelbase of 2,610 mm (103 in), the new B140 series did have the all new G-series engine. The new engine, which it shared with the Cedric, was of nearly exactly the same displacement as the old one, at 1,488 cc, but had 71 PS (52 kW) at 5,000 rpm. Top speed was 95 km/h (59 mph). The B140 was introduced in April 1960, at the same time as the cabover version, the Caball, received the new engine. Soon afterwards, the "Junior" part of the Caball's name was dropped entirely. There was also a 1.25 ton version, usually referred to as the B140 (B). The regular 1.75 tonner was called the B140 (A). Also in 1962, the Junior and Caball were also joined with the Datsun Cablight, an integration from former Japanese automobile manufacturer called Tokyu Kogyo Kurogane which Nissan acquired.

== Second generation ==
Nissan Junior
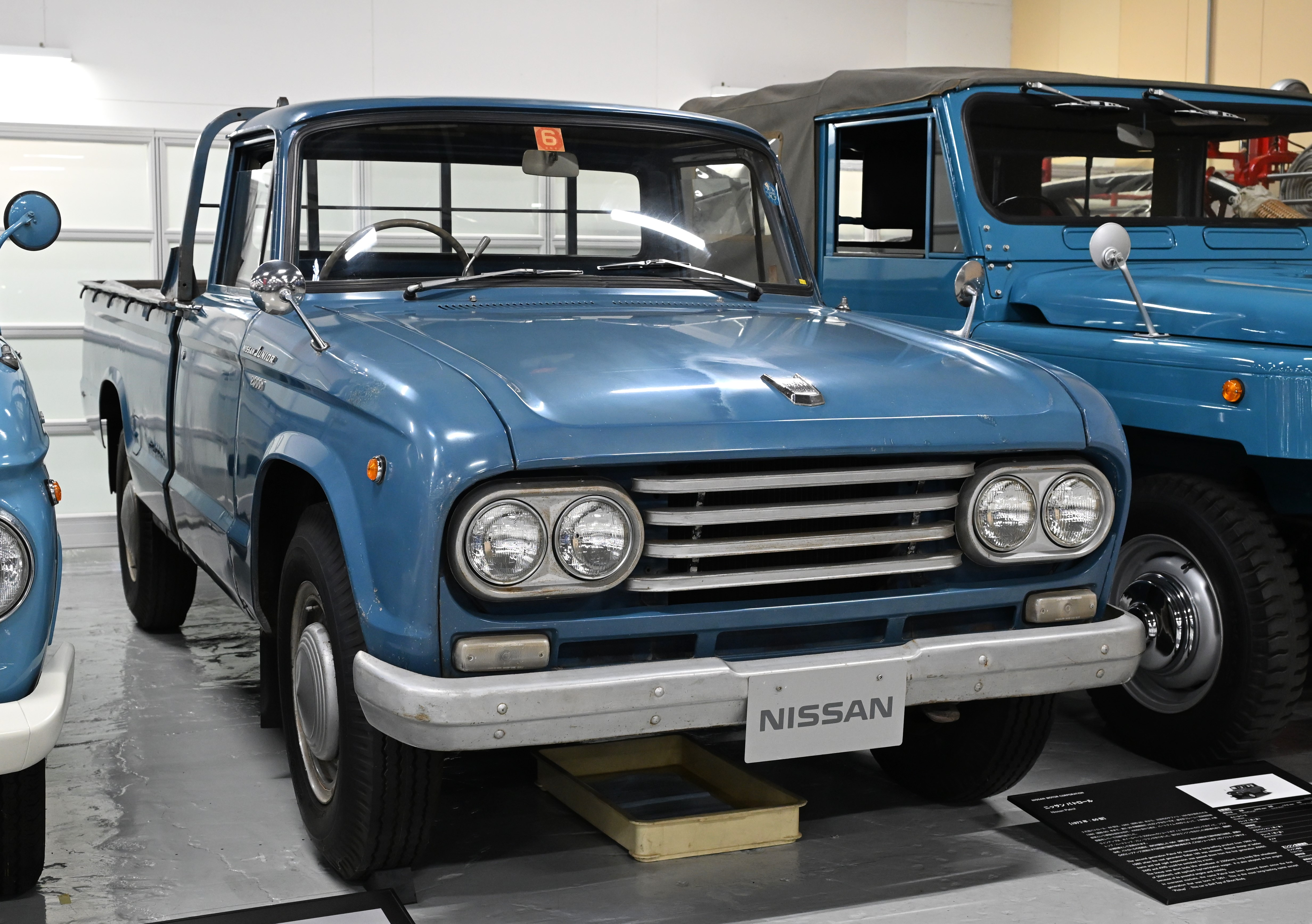
- 1967 Nissan Junior (41-series)

Overview
- Manufacturer: Nissan
- Production: 1962-1970

Body and chassis
- Layout: FR layout
- Related: Nissan Caball; Prince Miler

Powertrain
- Engine: 1.5 L G I4 (N40); 1.9 L H I4 (40); 2.0 L H20 I4 (41); 2.2 L SD22 diesel I4 (Q40, Q41)
- Transmission: 4-speed manual

Dimensions
- Wheelbase: 2,800 mm (110 in)
- Length: 4,660 mm (183 in)
- Width: 1,690 mm (67 in)
- Height: 1,730 mm (68 in)
- Curb weight: 1,500 kg (3,307 lb)

=== 40-series (1962–1966) ===
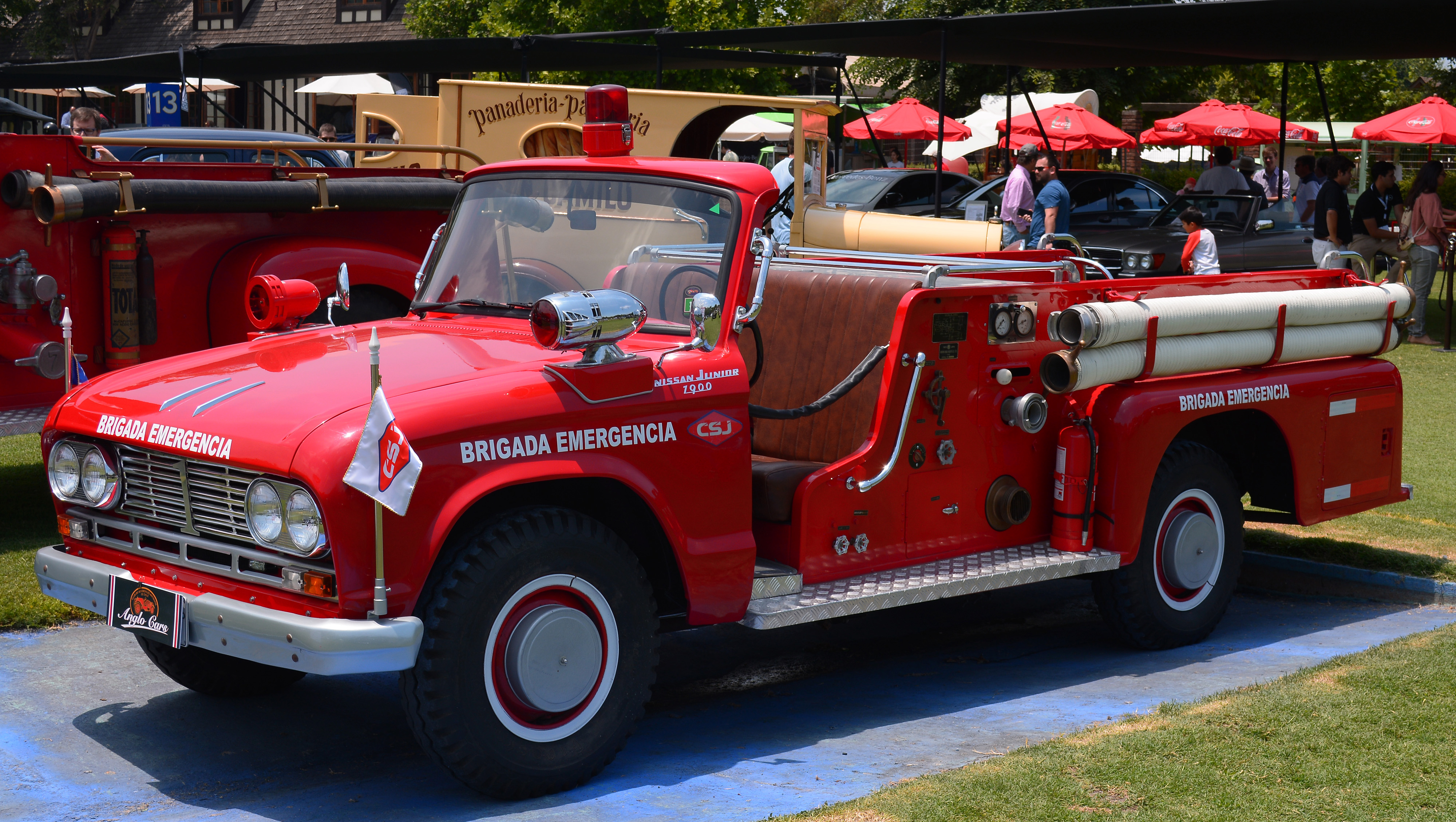
Fire truck based on 1965 Nissan Junior 1900

The all new second generation 40-series Junior was launched in January 1962. It was much more modern in design, with 4 headlights in a smart horizontal arrangement, more integrated fenders than its predecessor, as well as independent front-wheel suspension. The wheelbase was again increased, now to 2,800 mm (110 in). The entry level version (the N40) retained the 71 PS (52 kW) 1.5-litre G engine of the B140 Junior, but there was also a new 1.9-litre version which could reach 110 km/h (68 mph). This was the first medium-size truck to be able to carry 2 tons, and featured the same 85 PS (63 kW) 1,883 cc four-cylinder H engine as the 31-series Cedric. The Junior also used the Cedrics headlight surrounds, doorhandles, and various other trim details. Large, sixteen inch wheels and large wheel openings contributed to the upright look of the 40-series.

Export versions claimed slightly higher power outputs of 77 hp (57 kW) and 92 hp (69 kW) respectively. In July 1962, a fire truck (F40) was added to the lineup. A naked version with just a bonnet and windshield was called the 40E, a cab with chassis was the 40A, and a dropside pickup version was called 40H. Early catalogs also listed a double cab and a station wagon version, but it is doubtful that these were ever produced. There was also an "A-1 class" fire engine called the FR40. This interesting hybrid combined the 680-series heavy truck chassis, with its 125 PS (92 kW) 4-litre, six-cylinder P engine, with the Junior's bodywork. This was slightly altered to accommodate the considerably taller engine, with higher fenders and an insert in the grille underneath the headlamps.

The first 40-series cars had a two-piece grille painted in white. The top part had seven slim cross bars and three vertical bars, while the wider bottom part had four openings. After 1964, the upper part was chromed and the lower section was painted in body colour. The facelifted cars also had a red "Junior" badge in the grille. Around this time the Q40, a 70 hp (52 kW) 2.2-litre diesel version (SD22) also appeared. The only external difference was a small "diesel" badge on the fenders, where 2-tonners carried "1900"-badging.

=== 41-series (1966–1970) ===
In 1966, the second series became the 41, its engine upgraded from 1.9 to 2.0 litres (H20, 1,982 cc). Top speed with the 92 PS (68 kW) 2-litre was up to 120 km/h (75 mph). The lesser 1.5-litre version was discontinued, while the diesel continued on as the Q41. Export versions claimed 99 hp (74 kW). The 41 looked just like its predecessor, only with "2000" rather than "1900" badging. By 1967, however, the Junior received a makeover. Instead of a pressed metal piece between the headlights it had four thick horizontal bars. The lower piece was replaced by a piece with three openings (rather than four) and swept up ends, creating an oval shaped grille rather than the more rectangular early style. The early cars also had an indentation on the top of the front bumper to accommodate an opening for a mechanical crank, but this opening was now more discreet and the top line of the bumper was unbroken.

As with the 40-series, there were also 41A, 41E, F41, and FR41 (six-cylinder fire engine) versions. There was another minor change in 1968, with a new grille with very wide top and bottom bars, and three very narrow bars in between. Production of the now very outmoded 41 finally ended in September 1970.

== Third generation ==
=== 140/141 series (1970–present) ===
Nissan Junior
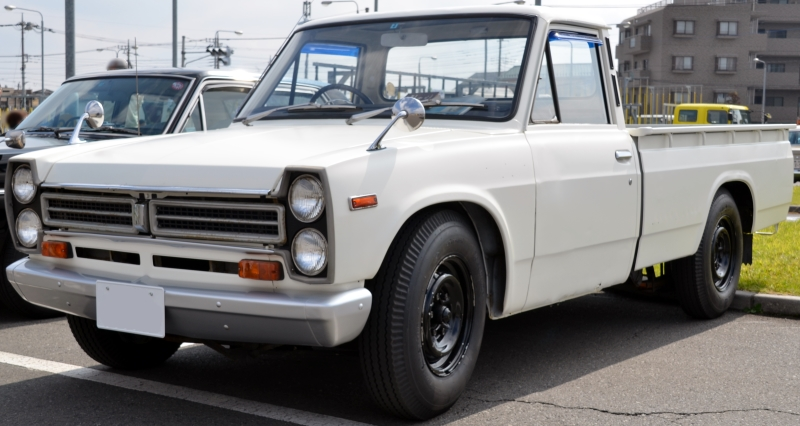
- Nissan Junior type 140

Overview
- Manufacturer: Nissan; Zamyad Co.
- Also called: Zamyad Z24 (Iran)
- Production: 1970-1982 (Nissan); 1970-present (Zamyad/SAIPA)

Body and chassis
- Layout: FR layout
- Related: Nissan Caball

Powertrain
- Engine: 1.6 L J16 I4; 2.0 L H20 I4; 2.4 L Z24 I4; 2.4 L Z24i I4; 2.2 L SD22 diesel I4; 2.8 L FAW CA4D28C4-1 diesel I4 (Iran)
- Transmission: 4 & 5-speed manual

Dimensions
- Wheelbase: 2,865 mm (112.8 in) (140); 2,805 mm (110.4 in) (141)
- Length: 4,655 mm (183.3 in)
- Width: 1,690 mm (66.5 in)
- Height: 1,745 mm (68.7 in)
- Curb weight: 1,485 kg (3,273.9 lb)

The 140 series Junior, which integrated the Junior and Miler lines, was introduced in October 1970. While considerably more modern than the 41-series, sales were unsatisfactory and Nissan soon cancelled exports outside of Asia. For sale in the Prince dealerships, this car was also called Nissan Miler. This generation of the Junior had three motors, of which only the petrol ones were offered in the Japanese domestic market: the familiar two-litre petrol version (H20) with 92 PS (68 kW), a 1.6-litre petrol version with 75 PS (55 kW), and a 60 PS (44 kW) diesel (SD22). All are four-cylinders with two valves per cylinder. The smallest 1.6-liter model (chassis code N140) was rated for 1.5 t (3,300 lb), while the regular 140-series models could handle 2.0 t (4,400 lb). There was also a 1.75 t (3,850 lb) version of the H20-engined truck, called the 140(N). Originally, there was also a fire truck version listed, a version with a separate flat bed, and a four-door crew cab ("W-Cab").

For 1979, an improved model, the 141, conforming to the 1975 exhaust emission regulations, was launched. The H20 engine's output had been down to 92 PS (68 kW) since 1972. This model also has 16 rather than 15-inch wheels, while the wheelbase contracted by 6 cm (2.4 in).

Sales in this segment slowed considerably as the eighties approached, as those of cabover trucks increased, and in 1982 the Junior was cancelled without a successor.

In 1970 the 140 series Junior was produced under license in Iran by Zamyad Co. in Tehran, Iran. They only produced 2.0 liter models. In 1986 the production line moved to SAIPA Co with using Z24 Nissan engines from Nissan/Datsun 720 Pickups. In 1998 production line moved again to Zamyad Co., where now Nissan Junior is still in production. Zamyad still using Z24i version of Nissan Z series engine and 2.8 liter Diesel engines. Zamyad also produces a rebodied version of the Z24 called the Shooka. From 2008, Zamyad began using the FAW CA4D28C4-1 diesel engine. This turbocharged 2.8-liter four-cylinder engine is based on Isuzu's 4JB1 engine and produces 93 PS (68 kW) at 3600 rpm and 225 Nm at 2600 rpm. Thus equipped, a Z24 can reach 160 km/h (100 mph).
