= International Scout =

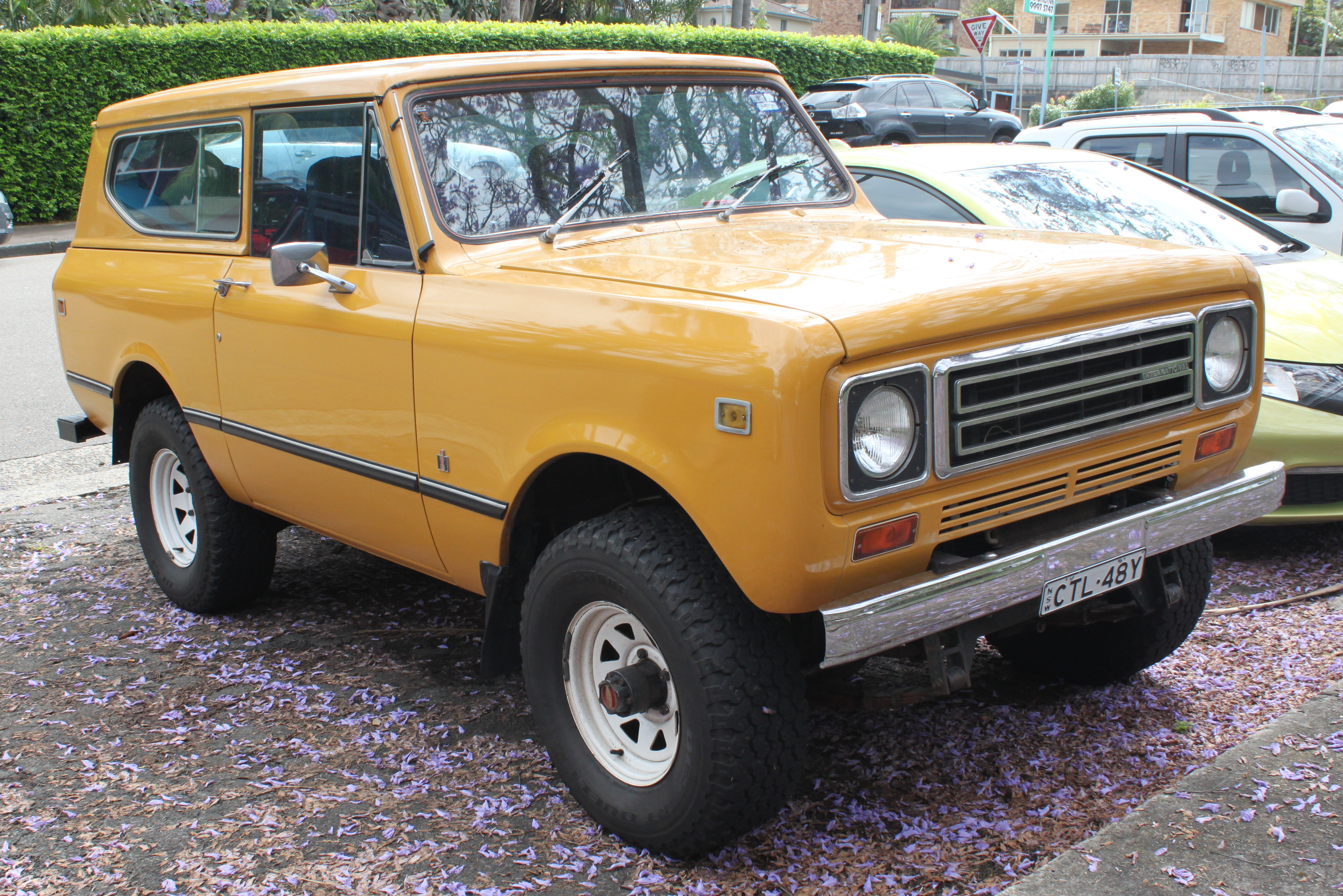
- 1978 Scout II wagon

Overview
- Manufacturer: International Harvester
- Production: 1961–1980
- Assembly: United States: Fort Wayne, Indiana
- Designer: Ted Ornas

Body and chassis
- Class: Full-size SUV/Off-road vehicle
- Body style: 2-door SUV; 2-door pickup truck
- Layout: Front engine, rear-wheel drive / four-wheel drive

The International Scout is an off-road vehicle produced by International Harvester from 1961 to 1980. Created as a competitor for the Jeep CJ, the Scout was the precursor of more sophisticated SUVs, including the Ford Bronco, Chevrolet Blazer, and the later Jeep Cherokee.

The Scout was designed as an open-top two-door truck as a base vehicle with options to configure it as a station wagon, half-cab pickup truck, or a soft-top convertible.

International Harvester assembled the model line in its facility in Fort Wayne, Indiana.

== History ==
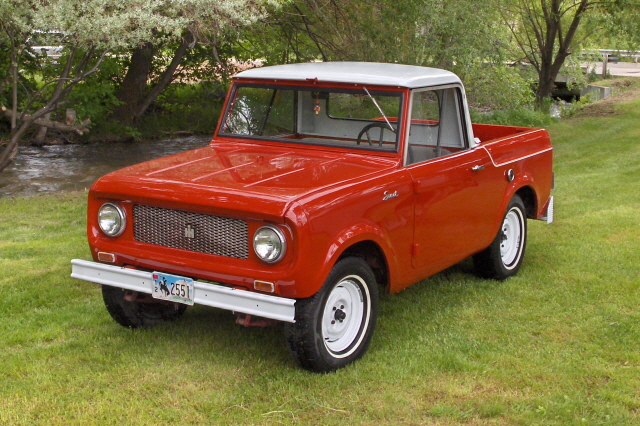
The first model, a 1961 Scout 80, as a pickup with a removable hardtop. A full cap was also available, known as the Travel-Top.

International Harvester began building trucks and pickups in 1907. In 1953, International began selling a truck-based people carrier, the Travelall. During the late 1950s, International began to design a competitor for the two-door Jeep CJ 4x4. The 1961 model year Scout 80 debuted in late 1960.

Later, chief designer Ted Ornas recalled:

...the market potential for a four-wheel drive recreational vehicle was an unknown quantity in the early 1950s. The only such vehicle offered in the post-war period was the Willys Jeep, a version of the military jeep produced for World War II. It was a flat-sided bare-bones product, and American military personnel learned to appreciate its ability to maneuver over rough terrain. Sales volume was very low. In early 1958, we were directed to develop a concept proposal to enter this small market. So help me, Mr. Reese, the engineering manager, said 'design something to replace the horse.' There was no product definition to use as a guide. It was even proposed to use the defunct Henry J body tooling. Compound body surfaces were considered too far out for this type of vehicle. The military jeep was thought to have the correct appearance. Our design sketches with the flat-side, no-contour look never excited the executive committee. The program began to die. One night while sitting at our kitchen table (full of frustration and desperation), I dashed off this rough sketch on a scrap mat board. It had contoured sides and was designed for plastic tooling. The next morning it was shown to a committee member. He reviewed it with controlled enthusiasm, but revived interest in the program. We were off and running. Goodyear produced many plastic parts for WWII and formed a large plastic engineering group. We entered a program with them, a scale model was vacuum formed to simulate body assembly. This model received executive approval for appearance. By July 1959, Goodyear completed their costing, and because of the high costs, the plastic program was cancelled. By this time, the contoured design met with executive approval and a decision was made to convert the body design to steel. Starting in late July 1959, a full-sized clay model was completed, and in November 1959, it was approved. It was a remarkable program with fast-paced engineering and manufacturing developments. The total development time of 24 months was a heroic achievement considering the concept was unique and no in-house engine or manufacturing was available or even considered when the program started.

The first Scout was introduced in 1960. A concept for its replacement was initiated in 1964 and approved for production in mid-1965. The Scout II was introduced in 1971. The basic sheet metal remained unchanged until production stopped on October 21, 1980. During the 20-year period (1960–1980), 532,674 Scouts were produced. The Scout, introduced as a commercial utility pickup in 1960, set the stage for future four-wheel drive recreational vehicles of the 1970s, 1980s and 1990s.

Print slogans and marketing jingles during the 1970s signaled its appeal in the words, "International Scout: Anything less is just a car."

=== Line tickets ===
When an order for an IH vehicle was sent to the factory, a factory plan or construction sheet was created with the new vehicle's VIN or ID number and all the codes for standard equipment and options used by the salesman that issued the order. This sheet was used to assemble the vehicle from beginning to finish. After the vehicle was assembled, shipped, and sold, the so-called line ticket identified the engine type, transmission type, drive line, paint codes, gear ratio, and standard and optional equipment specific to that vehicle. Different parts were used on the same model in the same year. A small copy of the line ticket was attached to each vehicle during the building process at the factory. The location of the ticket varied: 1971–1976 Scout IIs had their copies mounted under their hoods, attached to the cowl cover panels. The 1977–1980 Scout IIs had their copies on the inside of the glove box doors, and 1969–1975 pickups and Travelalls had them attached to the back of the glove boxes; depressing the keeper tabs on each side of the box lets the box swing down to reveal the ticket. If lost, line tickets can be ordered through several Scout parts specialists due to their diligence in maintaining these valuable resources.

== Models and variants ==
Scout models include:

- Scout 80 (1960–1965): Original standard model.
  - Scout 800 (1966–1971): Same overall design as 80, with upgrades (electric wipers, newer engines, etc).
  - Scout 810 (1971); some early Scout IIs contain Scout 810 badging on the glove box.
- Scout II (1971–1980): Later standard model with a removable soft or hard top (100-inch wheelbase).
  - Scout II Terra (1976–1980): Light pickup truck model (118-inch wheelbase).
  - Scout II Traveler (1976–1980): Sold with removable fiberglass hardtop and optional third row of seats (118-inch wheelbase).
  - Super Scout II (1977–1979): Sold with removable fabric doors, roll bar, and soft top. The soft-top model was tagged the "SSII" by IH marketing. Eventually, the "SS" letters were assumed to stand for "Super Scout", the name this model is called presently.

== Scout 80 and 800 ==
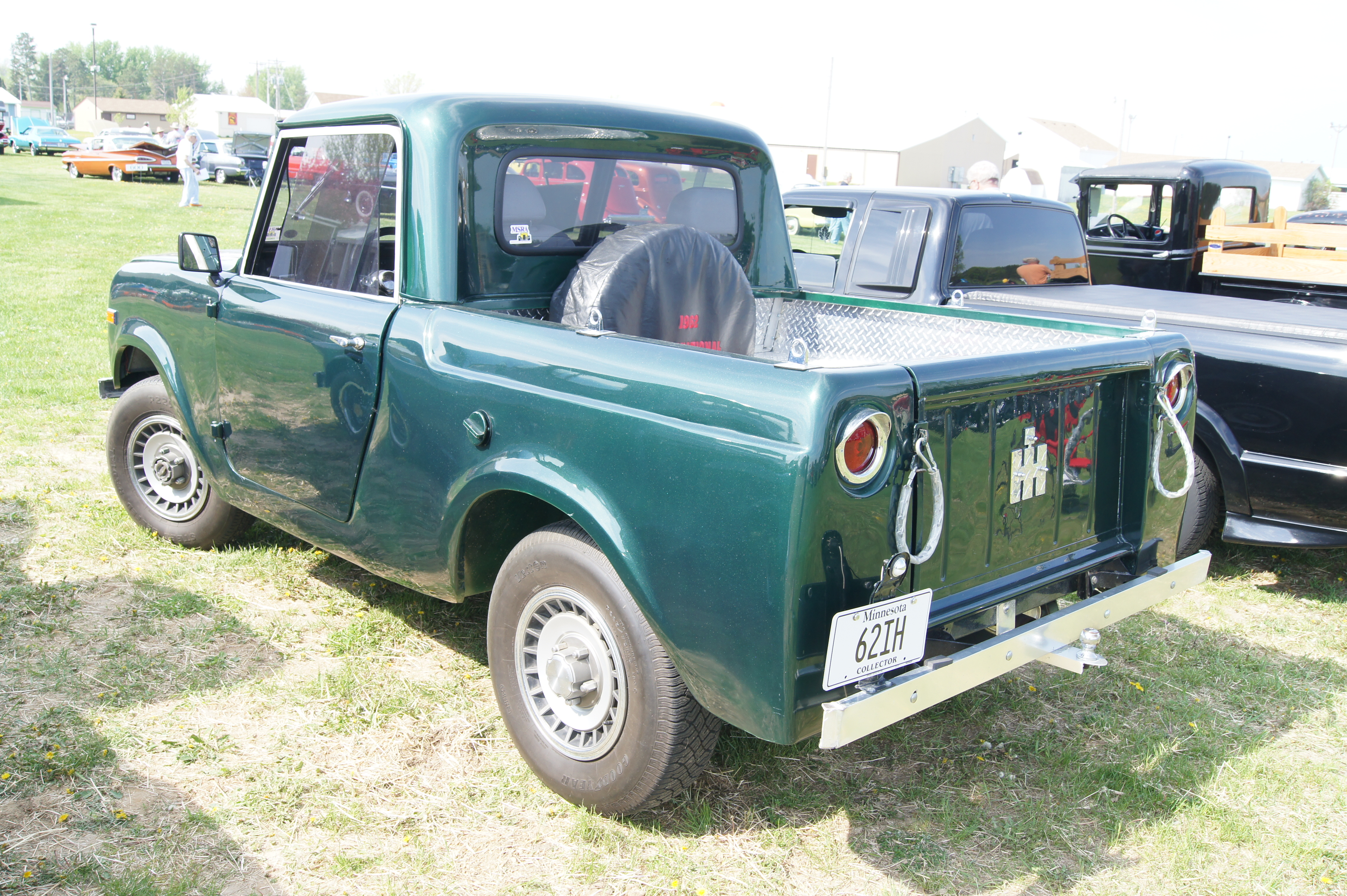
Rear view of an International Harvester Scout 80, showing the IH logo and tailgate hooks

=== 80 ===
Scout 80s were built between 1960 and 1965. These models were identifiable by removable sliding side windows in 1960–1961 and even some very early 1962 models, a fold-down windshield, vacuum windshield wipers mounted to the top of the windshield, and an IH logo in the center of the grille and tailgate. The Scout 80 had a gasoline-powered International 152 inline-four as its standard engine.

==== Red Carpet ====
The first special package was the "Red Carpet" series, celebrating the 100,000th Scout manufactured by International; only 3,000 were produced. It had a red interior with a white exterior, full-length headliner, full floor mats, and a special silver-plated medallion affixed to the door, which read "Custom". This Scout was a step up from regular models; it was marketed to attract more people and was often advertised with women in mind. Each International dealer in the United States received one Red Carpet Scout for use in parades, in the showroom, and for promotional purposes.

==== Campermobile ====
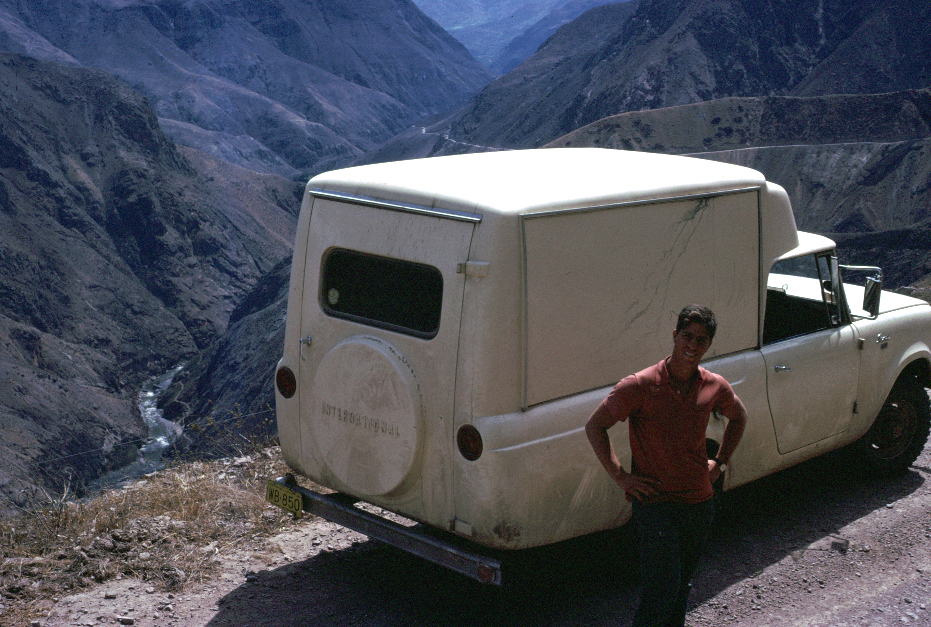
International Harvester Scout 80 Campermobile

During the early 1960s, International experimented with a camper body permanently mounted to the Scout 80. The roof was raised to nearly double the original height (to allow standing upright inside), tented sleeping bunks folded out from the sides, and the rear of the body was extended significantly. The tailgate/liftgate system was replaced with one large ambulance-style swinging door. Plans included that the unit could be purchased as a stripped-down shell ($960 installed), or as a "deluxe" unit with a dinette set, stand-up galley, and a screened chemical toilet that retracted into the wall ($1850 installed). The May 1963 issue of Mechanix Illustrated contained a full-color advertisement for the Scout Camper on the inside cover, which features two artist's renderings of the unit and a form to fill out and send in for free literature. The camper appeared again in the May 1963 issue of Popular Science, this time in an actual photo as part of a two-page article about pickup campers. Production of these units was low due to limited orders, and they are now rare.

=== Early 800 ===
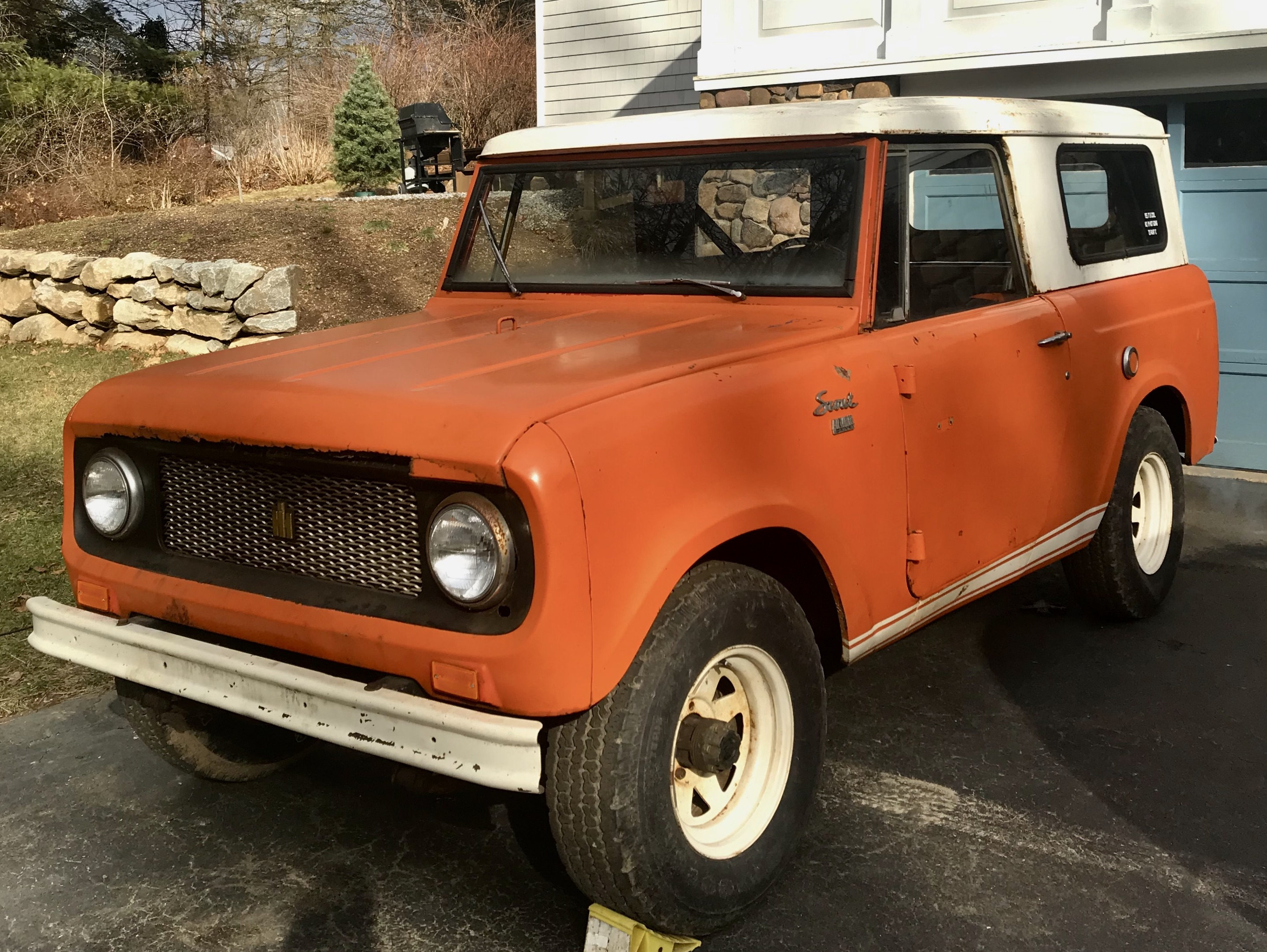
An early 1965 Scout 800 built with remaining Scout 80 parts. The hood loop in the center and grille from the 80 are present here. This vehicle's final inspection took place on 10/14/65 and it was deemed a new 800 model.

The final run of the Scout 80s were built in 1965 and the new 800 was fully developed during 1966. However, some Scouts built in the later months of 1965 are considered Scout 800s, as indicated by their VIN and Line Setting Ticket (LST). An assumed 3000 of these "1965 1/2" Scouts exist. Existing parts were used in piecing together these new 800 models, such as the hood that retained the tie-down loop that would hold down the 80's folding windshield, a feature the 800 lacked. This was likely due to an overstock of 80 parts from the years prior. The front grille, also from the 80, featured a gold-plated IH emblem on a black backing piece secured to wire mesh. In the new for 1966 models of the 800, the wire mesh grille stayed but the center emblem changed to spell "INTERNATIONAL".

A stronger Dana 44 axle was available in the 800 until 1968, though early 800 models only used the 80's weaker Dana 27 axle, which was more prone to axle shafts breaking during heavy off-road use. By 1968, Scout 800s came with 4-wheel drive as standard.

=== 800 ===
International Scout 800
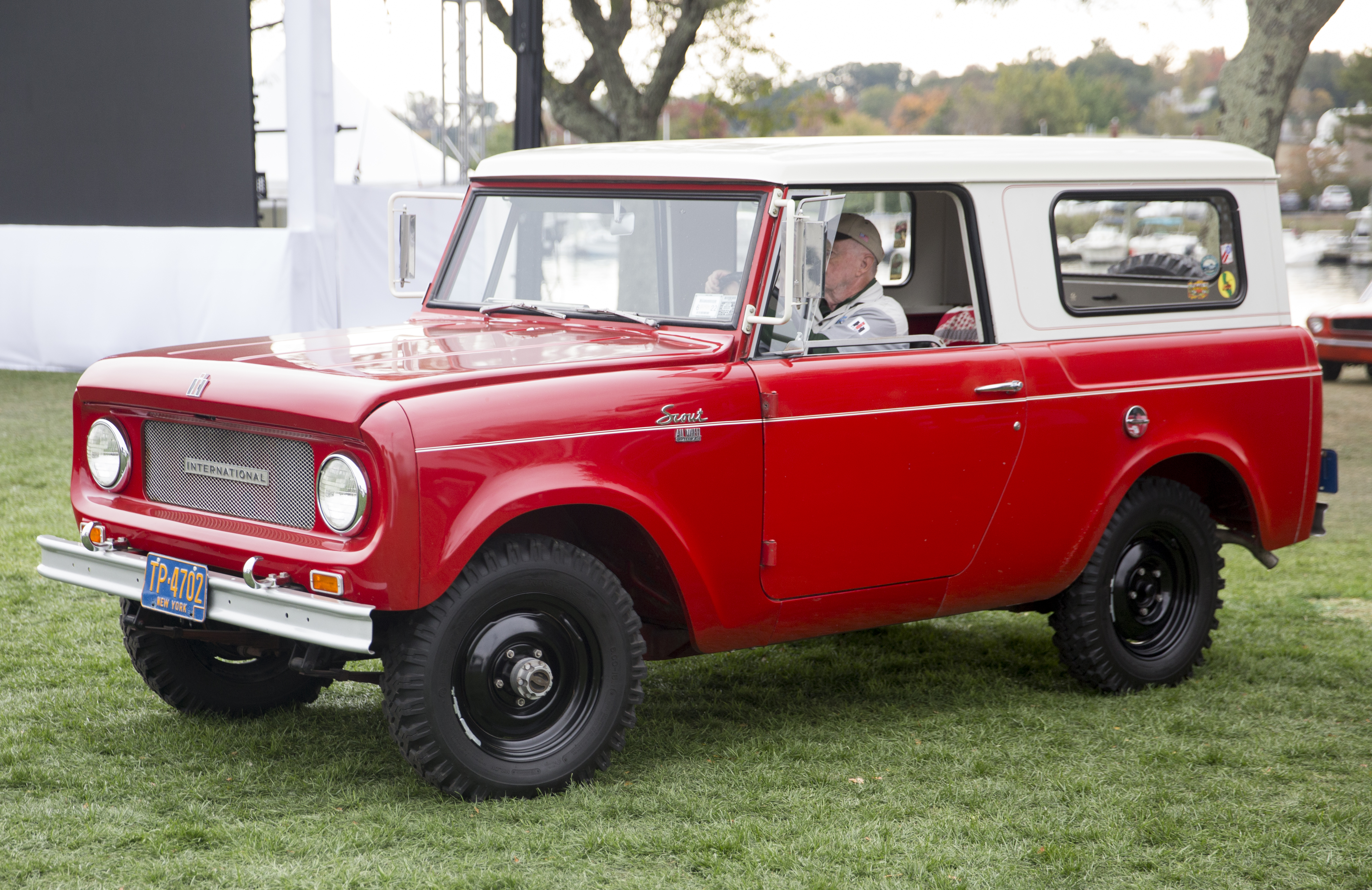

Overview
- Manufacturer: International Harvester
- Production: 1965–1968

Powertrain
- Engine: 152 cu in (2.5 L) Comanche I4; 196 cu in (3.2 L) Comanche I4; 232 cu in (3.8 L) I6; 266 cu in (4.4 L) V8

Chronology
- Predecessor: International Scout 80
- Successor: International Scout 800A

The Scout 800 replaced the Scout 80 in 1965 and was built from 1965 to 1968. These models had many improvements in comfort and design, including bucket seats, better instrumentation and heating systems, an updated dashboard, optional rear seats, and an optional 196 cu in (3.2 L) inline-four (from 1966) or 232 cu in (3.8 L) inline-six. Beginning in March 1967, International's 266 cu in (4.4 L) V8 engine was also offered. Externally, changes were limited to an anodized aluminum grille with a rectangular "International" logo placed on the grille (with the IH badge being moved to the hood), door handles with buttons, and a tailgate without hooks.

The base engine was a naturally aspirated International "Comanche 152" inline-four producing 93 hp (69 kW), of which a turbocharged version producing 111 hp (83 kW), the 152-T, was also offered. In August 1966, the 152-T was complemented by the larger 196-4, which used less fuel (being capable of 20 mpg) with the same power output. The 152-T was discontinued during early 1968. A fold-down windshield was still available as an option, but few were ordered because it was not advertised. The vacuum-powered wipers were moved to the bottom of the windshield frame with the fixed windshield.

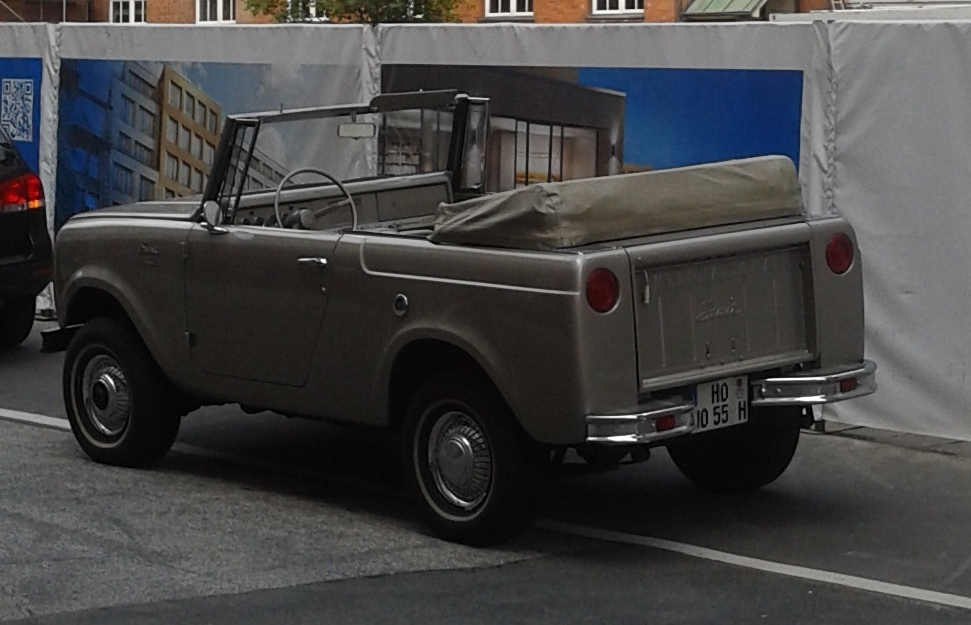
International Harvester Scout 800 Sportop

Beginning in early 1966, International also offered the Scout 800 Sportop, which had an upgraded interior and a unique fiberglass top (also available as a convertible) with a slanted rear roof and a Continental spare tire kit. The "Champagne Series" Scout was an upscale trim level offered in the Scout 80 and later Scout 800 models that featured a headliner, door panels, and carpet.

=== 800A ===
International Scout 800A
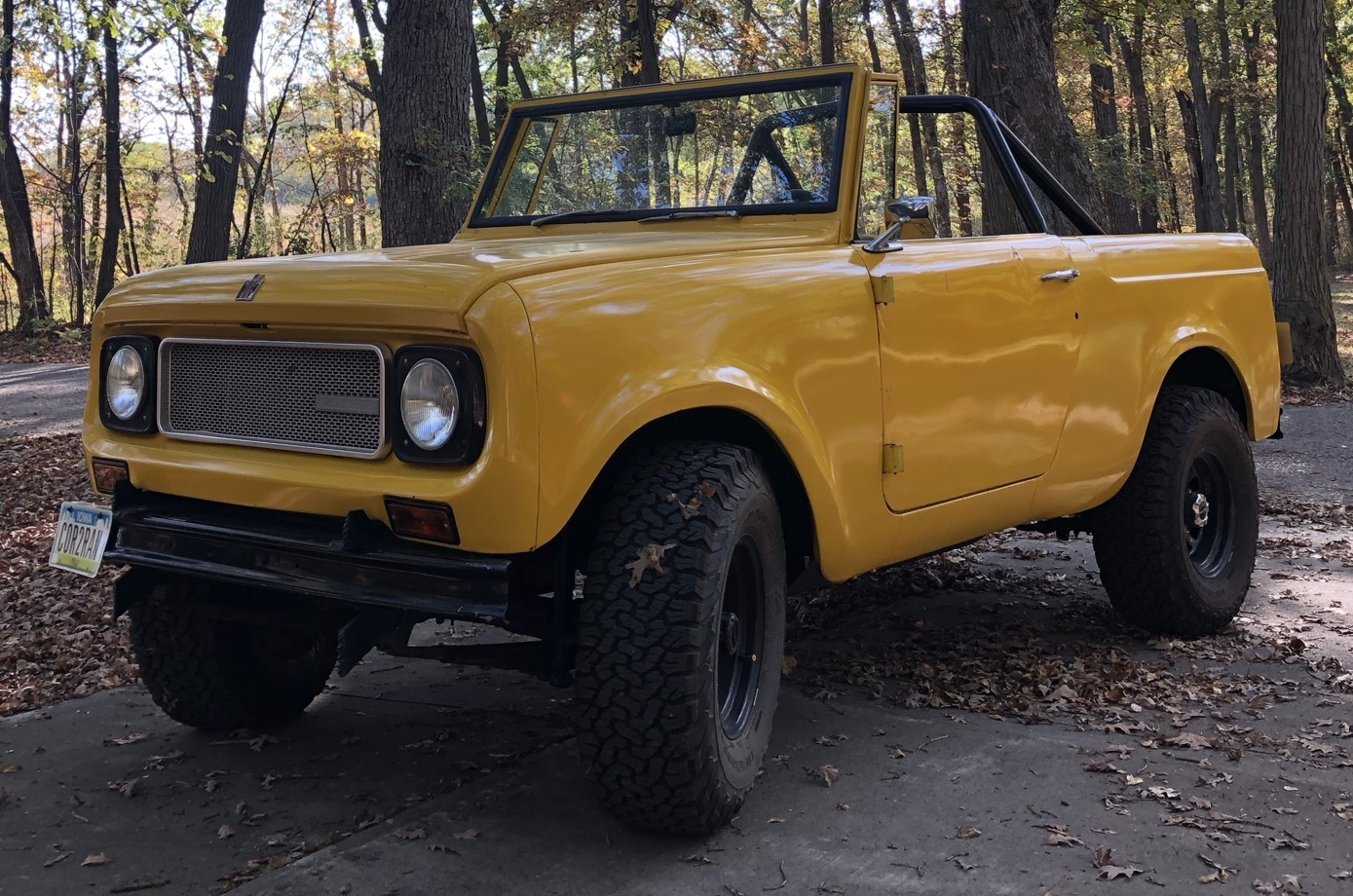
- International Scout 800A without its hard top

Overview
- Manufacturer: International Harvester
- Production: November 1968 – 1970

Body and chassis
- Related: 1000 D-Series pickup

Powertrain
- Engine: 152 cu in (2.5 L) Comanche I4; 196 cu in (3.2 L) I4; 232 cu in (3.8 L) I6; 266 cu in (4.4 L) V8; 304 cu in (5.0 L) V8

Chronology
- Predecessor: International Scout 800
- Successor: International Scout 800B

The 800A replaced the 800 in November 1968. Improvements included more comfort options, slightly different front end styling, drivetrain upgrades (a heavier rear axle and quieter Dana 20 transfer case), and the engine options of a 196 cu in (3.2 L) inline-four, 232 cu in (3.8 L) inline-six, 266 cu in (4.4 L) V8, or 304 cu in (5.0 L) V8. The inline-six was only offered for a short period in early 1969. The 800A's grille was in three segments: the center grille and two matte-black headlight bezels. The Light Line of pickup trucks received bodywork similar to that of the Scout in late 1969.

The 800A could be ordered with the Sportop, and later in Aristocrat and SR-2 packages. The Aristocrat was the final version of the original-bodied Scout. These trucks had a blue vinyl interior, a blue and silver paint scheme, and a chrome roof rack; four-wheel drive was standard for most models.

=== 800B ===
International Scout 800B

Overview
- Manufacturer: International Harvester
- Production: August 1970 – March 1971 (8 months)

Chronology
- Predecessor: International Scout 800A
- Successor: International Scout II

The last of the 800 series was the 800B, available for less than eight months from August 1970 until March 1971, before it was replaced by the Scout II. Other than minor cosmetic details (notably chrome instead of matte black headlight bezels), it was identical to the 800A. It was only produced until the Scout II entered production.

The 800B was available with the Comanche package. This package included special paint and decals, chrome trim, sliding Traveltop-style windows, and other options such as a roof rack, chrome wheels, and an upgraded interior. In late 1970, the Sno-Star package became available; only available with the six-cylinder engine, it was developed specifically for snowplow usage.

== Scout II ==
International Scout II
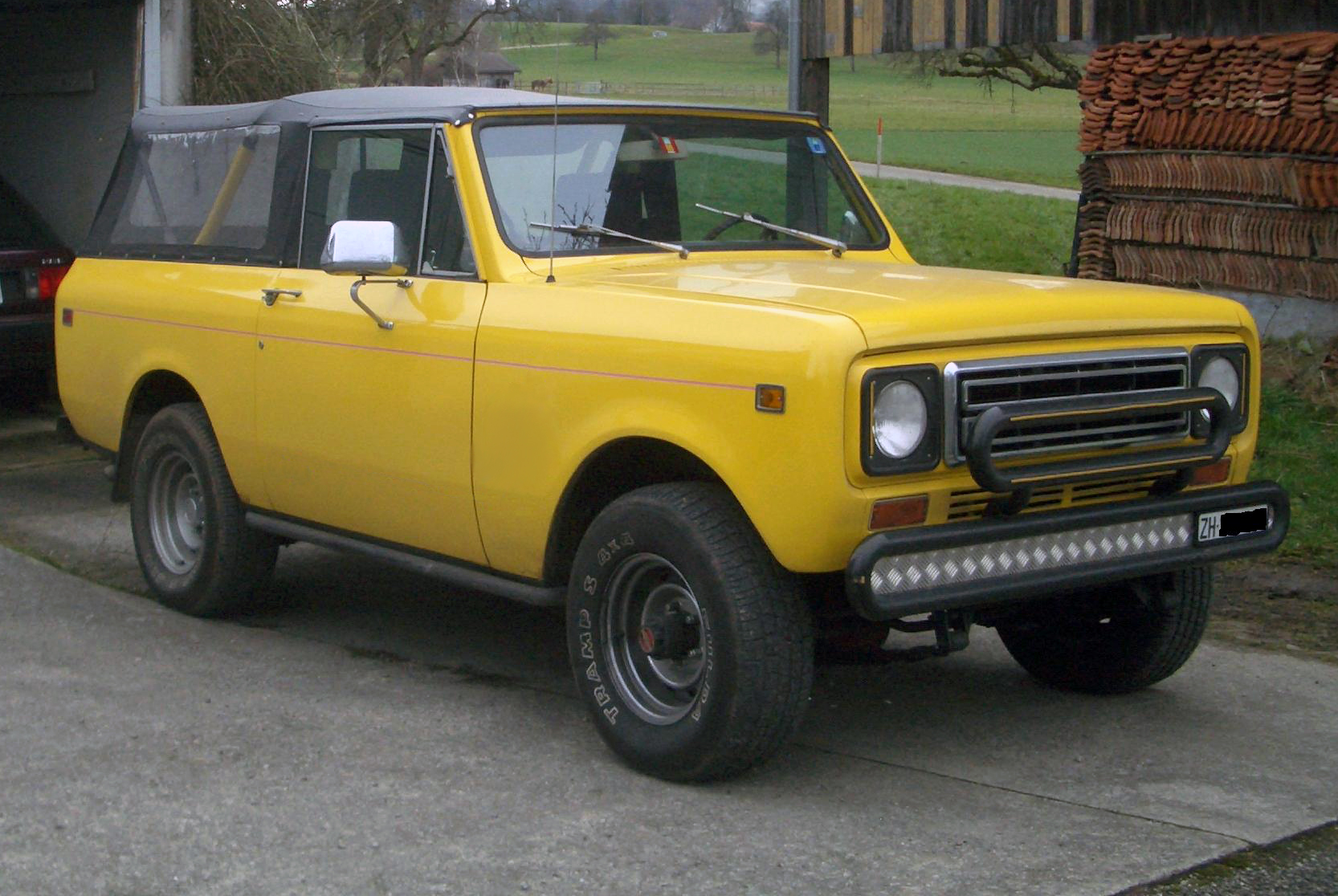

Overview
- Manufacturer: International Harvester
- Production: April 1971 – 1980
- Assembly: Fort Wayne, IN

Body and chassis
- Layout: RWD, 4WD

Powertrain
- Engine: gasoline: 196 cu in (3.2 L) IH I4; 232 cu in (3.8 L) AMC I6; 258 cu in (4.2 L) AMC I6; 304 cu in (5.0 L) IH V8; 345 cu in (5.7 L) IH V8; diesel: 198 cu in (3.2 L) Nissan SD33 I6 (1976-1979); 198 cu in (3.2 L) Nissan SD33T turbo I6 (1979-1980)
- Transmission: 3-speed Borg Warner T-14/T-15 manual; 4-speed Borg Warner T-18/T-19/T-45 manual; 3-speed Borg Warner T-39/T-49 automatic; 3-speed Chrysler A727 automatic

Dimensions
- Wheelbase: 100" Scout II, 118" Terra and Traveler

Chronology
- Predecessor: International Scout 800B

Scout IIs were manufactured from April 1971 to 1980. The design was finalized much earlier, with a version nearly identical to the production model shown to management in December 1967.

The Scout II is most identifiable by its different front grilles. The 1971–1972 Scout IIs' grilles had three horizontal bars between the headlights and chrome rings around the headlights. The 1973 Scout IIs had 14 vertical bars between the headlights, a split in the middle, seven bars on each side surrounded by chrome trim pieces, and an "International" badge at the bottom left corner. 1974–75 Scout II grilles added a vertical bar trim overlay to the 1973 design. 1975 grilles had chrome and black square trim rings around the headlights; 1976 had the same headlight trim rings as 1975, and a chrome center grille of 15 horizontal bars split into three sections was used in this year only, the automatic shifter was relocated to the floor

The maximum GVWR of all Scouts, no matter the engine or equipment, was increased to 6,200 lb (2,800 kg) for 1976 so as to avoid having to fit catalytic converters. These did not appear on Scouts until the 1979 model year. 1977–79 Scout IIs used the same grille between the headlight bezels; the new chrome grille had two large horizontal bars and three vertical bars, and the "International" nameplate was moved up to the center of the grille on the left side.

Scout II's could be ordered with the full metal Traveltop, the half-cab Roadster top (now seldom seen), or a soft top.

In 1980, the final year of production for the Scout, the grille used a distinctive single-piece design made of ABS plastic and available in black or silver. Both grille color options had imprinted chrome trim around the headlights and an "International" badge on the left side. Starting with late 1974 Scout IIs, power disc brakes were standard; early 1974 models had disc brakes as a rarely selected option. Very few 1971–1979 Scout IIs were ordered in RWD-only configuration—most were 4WD.

Before International discontinued the Scout in 1980, International experimented with Scout-based minivans, station wagons, dune buggies, Hurst-built special editions (in similar fashion to the Oldsmobile Hurst/Olds and Hurst SC/Rambler), and even a small motorhome. These plans were scrapped due to the International Harvester strike of 1979-80 and a lack of funds for the company to continue production of the Scout, let alone expand the Scout product line. The last IH Scout was produced on October 21, 1980.

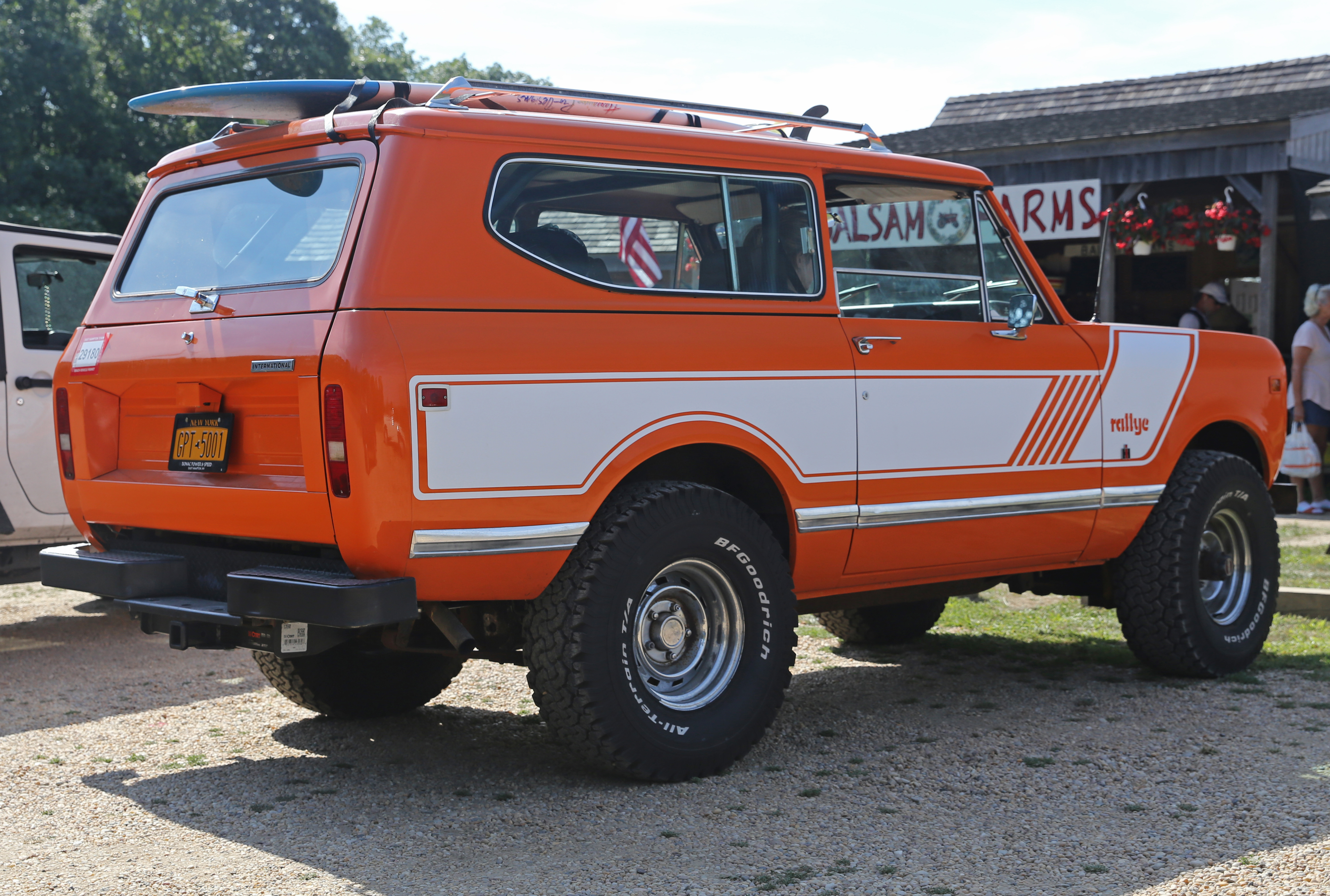
IH Scout II with Rallye package

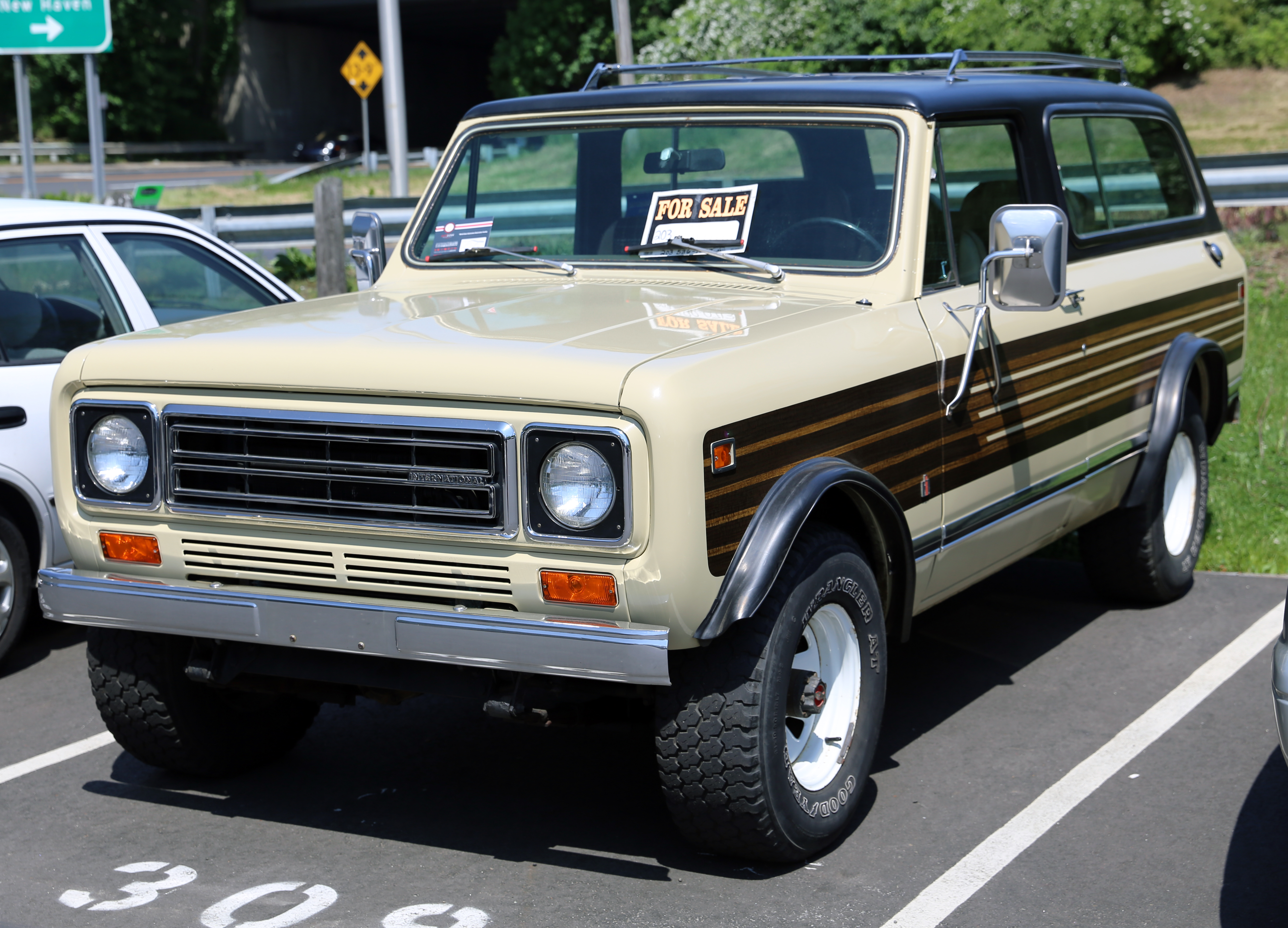
A 1976–1980 Scout II Traveler

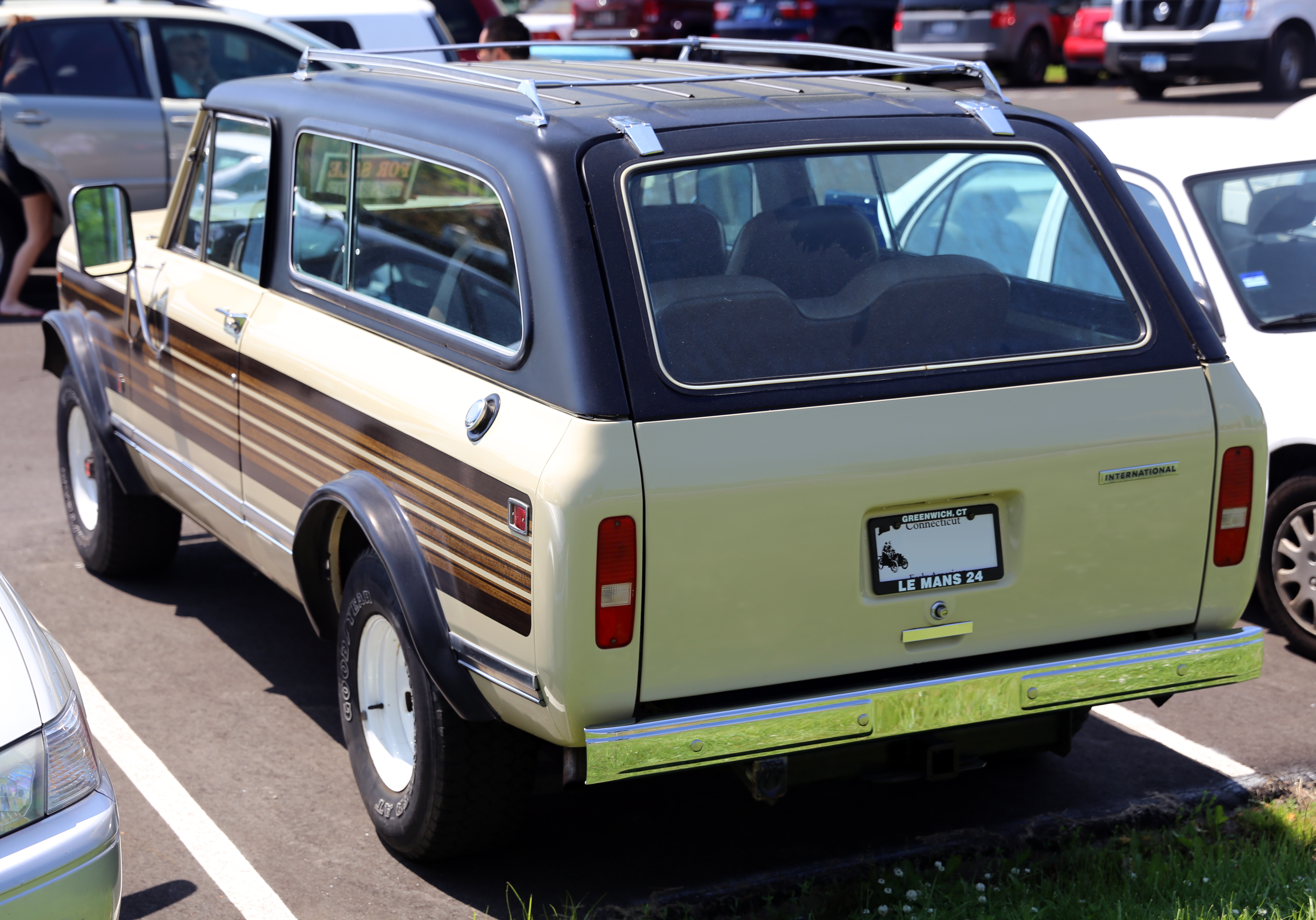
Rear view of a 1976–80 IH Scout II Traveler

=== Terra and Traveler ===
The Terra and Traveler were produced from 1976 to 1980. Terras and Travelers had fiberglass tops, with a half-cab for the Terra and a full top with a hatchback-type liftgate on the Traveler. These models were extended by 18 in (46 cm) between the door and the front of the rear wheel well.

=== SSII ===
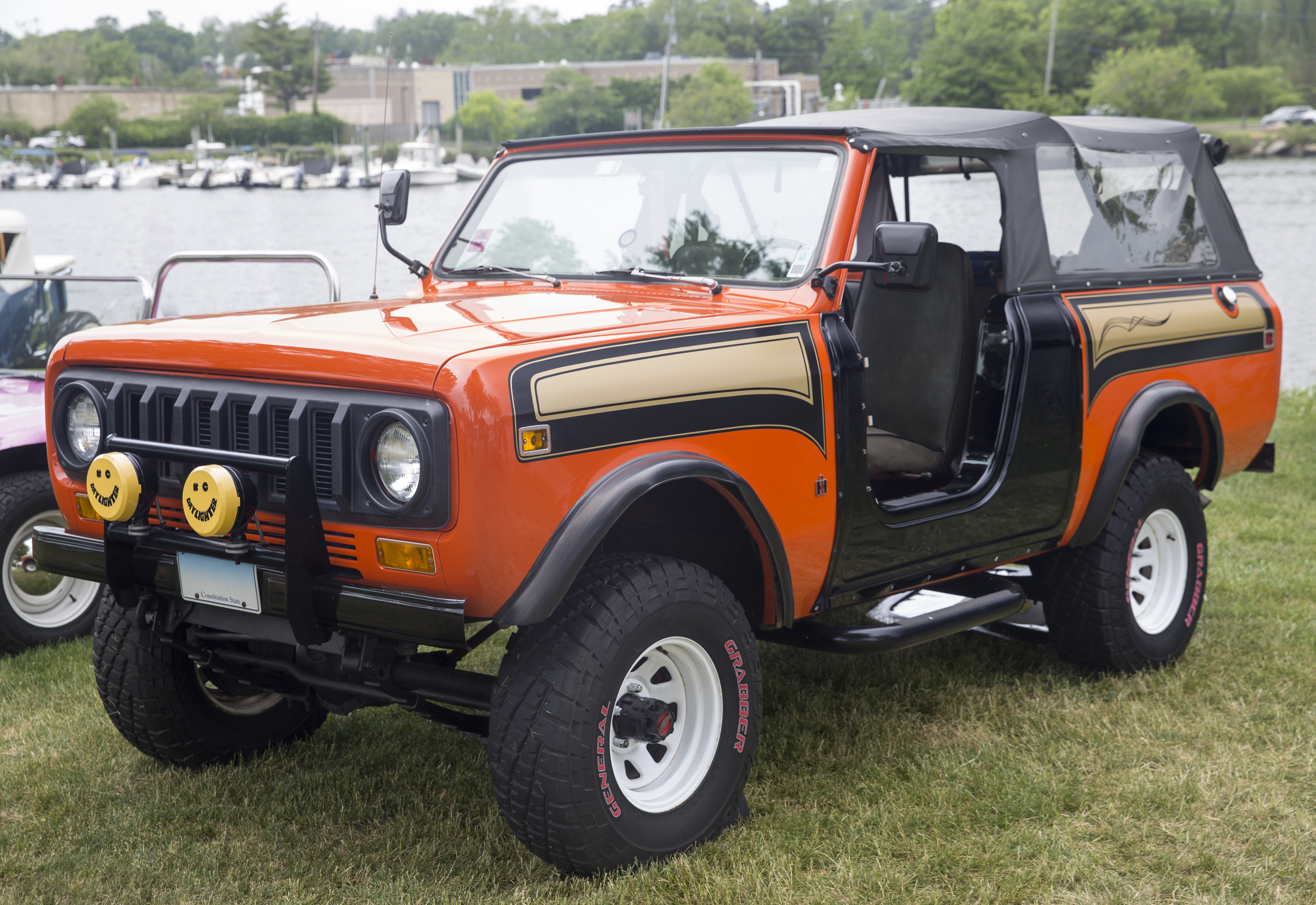
1977 International Scout SSII Baja Cruiser

The SSII (Super Scout II) was a stripped-down, off-road version introduced in February 1977. It was intended to compete directly with the Jeep CJ and was built until 1979. It included a soft top with soft doors, windshield-mounted mirrors, plastic door inserts, a unique plastic grille, and a roll bar, among other options. Four sub-models were on offer, from the barebones four-cylinder Rancher Special (the passenger seat was a cost option, as was the soft top and rear bumper) and the slightly more comfortable Brush Buster, to the dressy Sport and Baja Cruiser models. Several SSIIs were champions on the off-road racing circuit during the late 1970s.

=== Special packages ===
==== Shawnee Scout ====
The Shawnee Scout was to be a trim type and special-feature package model produced by Hurst Performance. This model was built by dressing up a black SSII with special tomahawk and feather decals, special seats, a black targa-style top, hard tonneau bed cover, and a Hurst shifter. Only three Shawnee Scouts were produced.

==== CVI models ====
CVI (Custom Vehicles Incorporated; also associated with Arlington-based Good Times, Inc.) was a company located beside the Fort Wayne Scout Assembly Plant that produced special models for IH dealers in 1979 and 1980. The special models were dressed-up Scouts with unique exterior decals and trim, center console coolers, and hood scoops. Some versions had plastic louvers over the rear side windows, fender flares, and two different plastic tailgate inserts. Model names included the Midnitestar, Terrastar, Travelstar, Shadow, Raven, Green Machine Sport), Gold Medallion Scout, Hot Stuff, Trailstar, Sportstar, 5.6-Liter, 3.2-Liter, and two Classic models.

==== Selective Edition ====
This was a special package available from the factory. The 1978–79 package order code on the line ticket was 10992. The package included special gold accent stripes, gold-spoke wheels with Goodyear Tracker A-Ts, SSII black grille insert, and Sport Steering wheel. Different powertrains, interiors, and seats were an option, as were radios, cruise control, tow packages, and air conditioning, all available in exterior colors 1032 Dark Brown, 6027 Dark Blue, 001 Black, or 5013 Green. This package was available on the Traveltop, Traveler, and Terra models.

==== Spirit of 76 and Patriot ====
For the US Bicentennial in 1976, IH produced the Spirit of 76 and the Patriot models.

The Spirit of 76 had a special blue soft top, blue/red side applique, blue interior, racing-type steering wheel, and 15x7-inch chrome rally wheels. It was only available for standard Scout IIs. IH data only shows 384 Spirit models ever being built. Line tickets codes included were:

- 10876 for the side applique
- 18696 to omit the hard top
- 16928 deluxe interior
- 16872 blue interior color
- 9219 winter white exterior paint
- 885102 10–15 front tires
- 925102 10–15 rear tires with spare
- 29091 7-in chrome wheels

The Patriot had a hard top and the same blue/red side applique, but was available for the Scout II, Terra, or Traveler. Sales figures on the Patriot show only one Terra, seven Travelers, and 50+ Scout IIs manufactured with these options. However, another undetermined number of Patriots were built without line ticket code designations (where the applique was applied at the Truck Sales Processing Center), making how many were built difficult to determine. Nevertheless, both models can be considered extremely rare.

==== Midas Edition ====
From 1977 to 1980, IH contracted with Midas Van Conversion Co. of Elkhart, Indiana to build special luxury models to be offered through its dealers. These vehicles had swivel bucket seats, shag carpets, color-keyed interiors, door panels, headliners, grille guards, dual sunroofs, overhead clocks, third seats, reading lights, tinted windows, fender flares, and special side appliques and paint designs. Models included the Family Cruiser (or just "Cruiser"), Street Machine, and Off-Road Vehicle. Another company named Van American (based in Goshen, Indiana) offered similar versions to compete with Midas; however, their vehicles were only offered for a brief time, making them currently very rare.

==== Special Limited Edition ====
Probably one of the rarest models ever produced by IH was the 1980 Special Limited Edition RS Scout. This version was only available on the Traveler in Tahitian Red metallic paint. Its numerous special features included polycast wheels with Tahitian Red accents, a luxurious plush all-velour russet interior including headliner and visors, special pin striping, a wood-grain trim instrument panel and shift console, chrome bumpers, and tinted glass. Two other special versions offered in 1980 were the 844 and 434 Gold Star models. The 844 offered standard equipment plus a 345 cu in (5.7 L) V8, heavy-duty clutch, T428 four-speed manual transmission, 2.72 rear axle ratio, AM radio, rear seat, hub caps, a special black side applique and paint on the lower body, and black carpeting, while the 434 offered standard equipment plus a 4–196 cu in (3.2 L) engine, T332 three-speed transmission, a 3:73 rear axle ratio, black vinyl interior, AM radio, rear seat, hubcaps, a special black side applique and paint on lower body, and black carpeting.

== Engines ==
International offered the Scout with a variety of engines over its years of production. The Scout 80 used the gasoline-powered "152" four-cylinder as its standard engine. The 800, 800A, and 800B used the gasoline-powered "196" four-cylinder, AMC "232", "266" six-cylinder, "266" V8, and "304"V8. With the exception of the four-cylinder engines, most of these engines were shared with the International Light Line pick-up trucks and the International Travelall station wagon. A turbocharged version of the "152" four-cylinder engine was offered from 1965 to 1967.

The Scout II had the following engine options: the 196 cu in (3.2 L) 4-cylinder, 232 cu in (3.8 L) 6-cylinder (early production), 258 cu in (4.2 L) 6-cylinder (later production), 304 cu in (5.0 L) V8, and 345 cu in (5.7 L) V8. International never installed a 392 cu in (6.4 L) V8 or an AMC V8 engine into a Scout. At the time, International did not manufacture a diesel engine small enough to be used in the Scout, and so starting in 1976 offered the naturally aspirated Nissan SD33 diesel engine as an option. This engine was replaced by the turbocharged SD33T engine in late 1979 for the 1980 model year.

=== List of engines ===
- IH 4-152
- IH 4-196
- IH SV-266
- IH SV-304 (not to be confused with the AMC 304 V8)
- IH SV-345
- IH SV-392
- AMC 6–232
- AMC 6–258
- Nissan SD33
- Nissan SD33T

== Axles and gear ratios ==
Dana 27 axles were used for the front and rear wheels in the 80 and 800 models until around 1968. Both front and rear differentials were offset to the passenger side for the purpose of lining up the drive shafts with the Dana 18 transfer case. With the transition to the 800A model, the rear axle was upgraded to a Dana 44, with a centered differential mated to a Dana 20 transfer case. Some Scouts from this transitional period use a mix of old and new components, with the rear driveshaft running at an angle. The front axle was still a Dana 27, though a 3,500 lb (1,600 kg) axle upgrade option used a hybrid unit built from a Dana 30 center section and 27 tubes. The V8 engine option included an upgrade to the heavier-duty Dana 30 axle. The rear axle shafts changed from two pieces to one piece around 1968 or 1969. A Power-Lock limited-slip differential was provided as an option for both front and rear axles. Common final drive gear ratios are 3.31, 3.73, or 4.27, though nearly any ratio was available by special order (in at least one instance, a Scout 800 was shipped with a 5.71 ratio).

In Scout IIs, Dana 30 front axles and Dana 44 rear axles were standard until 1974, with Dana 44 front axles as a special option. After 1974, Dana 44 front and rear axles became standard on all Scout IIs. Available gear ratios were 2.72, 3.07, 3.31, 3.54, 3.73, 4.09, 4.27, and 4.54. Track-Lock limited-slip differentials were optional.

Axles originally had a tag bolted to their differential cover stamped with their gear ratio, but this tag often rusted off over time or was removed intentionally. The line ticket can be checked to identify the axle model, gear ratio, and whether it is equipped with a traction device using an International parts code book.

== Monteverdi Safari ==
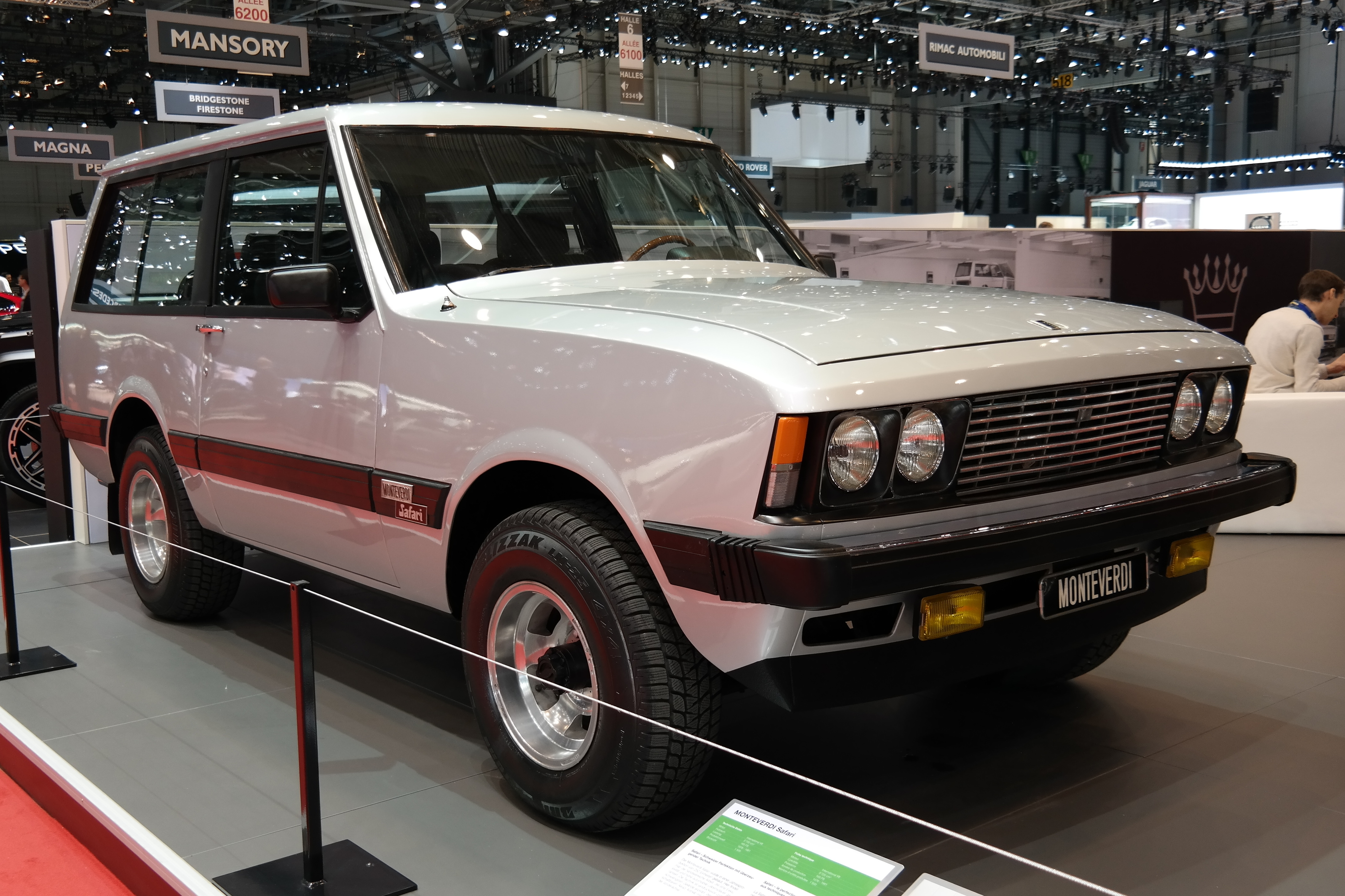
1978 Monteverdi Safari

1978 Monteverdi Sahara

The Monteverdi Safari was made by Swiss luxury automaker Monteverdi, who used Scout IIs as bases for luxurious off-road SUVs. Two models were made during the late 1970s: the Safari, which had a new body built by Fissore, and the lower-priced Sahara, which retained most of the Scout's original bodywork, but featured a restyled front end and a more luxurious interior. Both were available with IH's SV-345 engine or Chrysler's LA 318 (5.7 or 5.2 L). The Safari was also offered with Chrysler's 7.2 L "440 RB" engine, while the Sahara could reportedly be had with the Nissan SD33 diesel engine.

== Scout III SSV concept ==
IH developed a concept prototype for the next version of the Scout in 1979 named the Scout III SSV, but due to the company's decision to discontinue the Scout product line, it was never put into production. The second prototype of the concept vehicle is displayed at the Auburn Cord Duesenberg Automobile Museum in Auburn, Indiana. It was a two-door model with a sloped back window, built on a 100-inch (2,500 mm) chassis with a 162 hp (121 kW) V8. The SSV name, standing for Scout Supplemental Vehicle, referred to what would have been a limited-production supplement to the regular model to help promote it, much as the Corvette supplements the Chevrolet brand. While the SSV may have appeared in 1981 if it had reached production, designs already existed for a new model in 1981 to replace the Scout II. Clay models of these designs showed an evolution of the Scout II into a more rounded body resembling the Chevrolet S-10 Blazer.

== Case IH Scout ==
In 2010, Case IH started production of a UTV named the Scout and Scout XL, also sold as the New Holland Rustler. These UTVs were built by Club Car.

== Motorsports ==
Scout SSIIs were awarded honors for off-road racing during the late 1970s. In 1977, an SSII driven by Jerry Boone of Parker, Arizona finished first among 4x4 production vehicles in the Baja 1000. Boone completed the run in 19 hours and 58 minutes, crossing the finish line at Ensenada almost 2 hours ahead of his closest competitor, a Jeep CJ7, and at times ran even faster than Class IV modified 4x4 racers. Only 9 of 21 vehicles that started the race finished the 1,000 km (620 mi) course. Boone later revealed that his team only had a month to prepare a stock SSII for the race and were not sponsored by IH until after the race. Boone also won in 1978 at Riverside, California.

Sherman Balch, among many other accomplishments in off-road racing, won the off-road "world championship" in 1977 (the SCORE event in Riverside, California). Three other finishers also drove Scouts. Balch also won the Baja 1000, the Mint 400, and three events in the fall of 1978 at Lake Geneva Raceway. Balch and co-driver James Acker later won virtually all major off-road races in 1982 offered on the West Coast/Mexico circuit in an SSII: the Baja 250, the Baja 500, the Baja 1000, the Mint 400, and the Parker (Arizona) 400.

== Revival ==
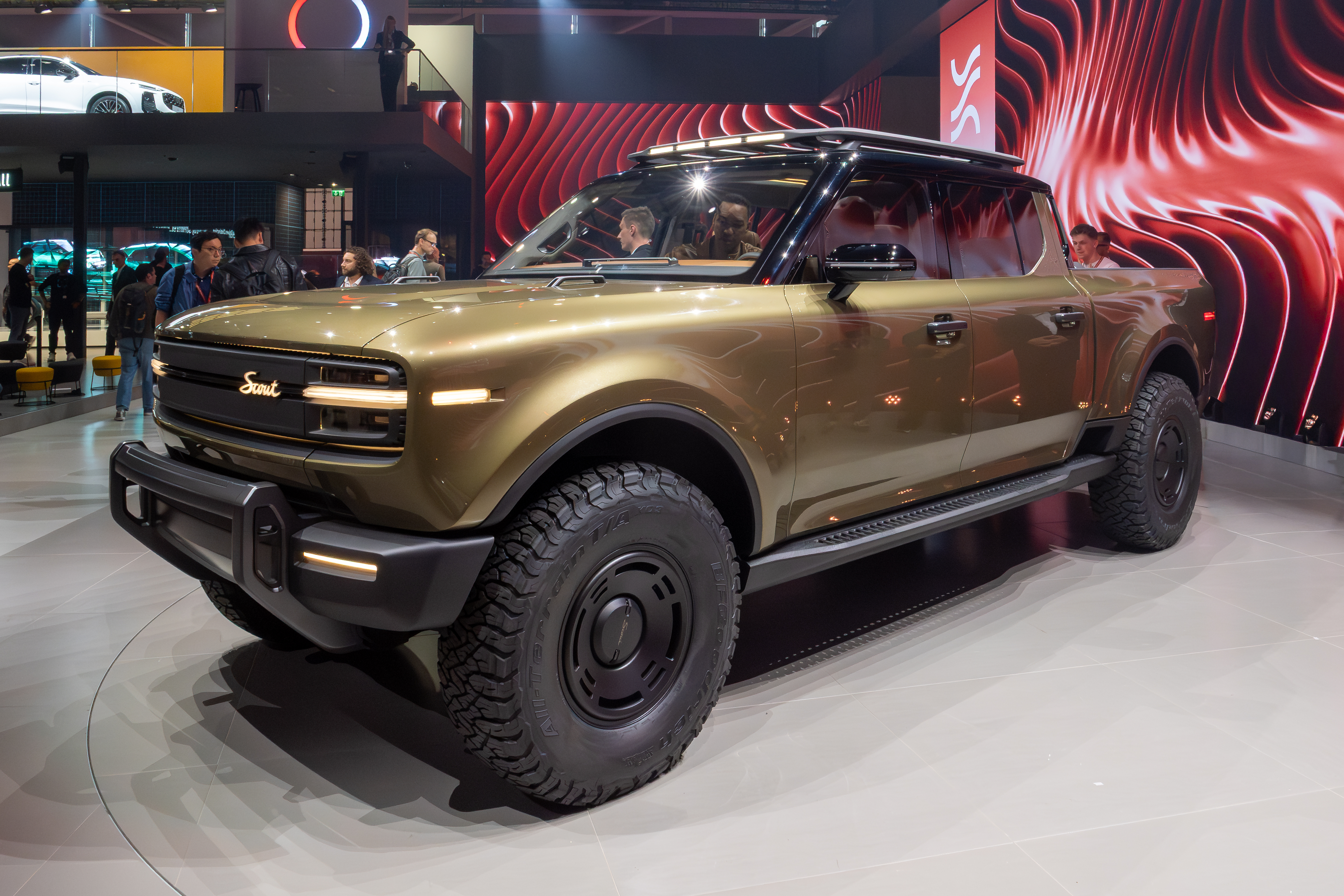
Scout Terra (pre-production model)

In September 2021, a report by Motor Trend revealed that Volkswagen Group may look to revive the Scout nameplate as a potential competitor to the Jeep Wrangler, Toyota 4Runner, and the revived Ford Bronco. VW Group had acquired the Scout trademarks earlier in the year when its commercial truck business Traton acquired Navistar. As VW Group is unlikely to acquire the International Harvester trademarks from Case IH even for a licensing deal, a revived Scout would either be sold under the Volkswagen nameplate as a sub-brand similar to the aforementioned Bronco or as a standalone off-road themed brand similar to Jeep. These rumors were confirmed when in May 2022, Volkswagen announced its intention to produce electric pickups and SUVs - and therefore become a competitor to Rivian and other electric off-road oriented vehicles - built in the United States as Scout Motors under the Scout brand name. The first prototype is expected in 2024, with production models expected by 2026.

Scout Motors revealed two concepts on October 24, 2024, one of which is the Terra, a pickup truck, and the other is the Traveler, an SUV. They are expected to release in late 2027 as a 2028 model.
