= Nissan G engine =

Overview
- Manufacturer: Nissan
- Production: 1960-1965

Layout
- Configuration: Inline-4
- Displacement: 1.5L
- Cylinder bore: 80 mm (3.1 in)
- Piston stroke: 74 mm (2.9 in)
- Valvetrain: OHV

Output
- Power output: 75-85 hp
- Torque output: 83-92 lb·ftf

Chronology
- Successor: Nissan H engine

The Nissan G-series engine was a pushrod engine produced in the 1960s. The G series was used in the Fairlady/Sports 1500 roadster, the Cedric, and Junior. It evolved into the Datsun 1600's "R"/H16 engine.

Prior to its merger with Nissan, Prince also made a G series of engines. These are unrelated engines and are documented at the Prince G engine page.

== G ==
The plain "G" engine was a 1.5-L (1488 cc) used in the Sports 1500 from 1963 through 1965. It was an OHV design. Bore was 80 mm (3.15 in) and stroke was 74 mm (2.91 in). Output was 75 to 85 hp (55.9 to 63.4 kW) and 83 to 92 lb·ft (112.5 to 124.7 Nm) depending on the carburetor equipped.

Applications:

- 1960 Nissan Cedric 30
- 1961 Nissan Junior Caball C140
- 1962 Datsun Fairlady SP310 (1 and 2 barrel versions)
- 1962 Nissan Cedric 31
- 1962 Nissan Junior 40
- 1964-1968 Nissan Silvia CSP311 (prototype)

== See also ==
- List of Nissan engines
- Prince G engine
- Nissan H engine
