= Nissan SD engine =

Overview
- Manufacturer: Nissan Diesel Motor Co., Ltd

Layout
- Configuration: Straight-4 and Straight-6
- Displacement: 2.0–3.2 L (1,991–3,245 cc)
- Cylinder bore: 83 mm (3.27 in); 89 mm (3.5 in)
- Piston stroke: 92 mm (3.62 in); 100 mm (3.94 in)
- Valvetrain: OHV

Combustion
- Turbocharger: On SD33T
- Fuel system: Injection pump
- Fuel type: Diesel
- Cooling system: Water-cooled

Output
- Power output: 60–82 PS (44–60 kW)
- Torque output: 237 N⋅m (175 lb⋅ft)

Chronology
- Successor: Nissan TD engine

The SD engine was replaced by the Nissan TD engine. It was manufactured by Minsei Diesel Industries, Ltd., which was renamed Nissan Diesel Motor Co., Ltd in 1960.

== Straight-four ==
=== SD20 ===
The SD20 is a naturally aspirated 2.0 L (1,991 cc) straight-four diesel engine with a bore and stroke of 83 mm × 92 mm (3.27 in × 3.62 in). It had three main bearings. The Diesel versions of the Nissan Cedric in the 1960s until the early 1980s used this engine, which produces 60 PS (44 kW) at 4,000 rpm. It was first seen in a passenger car in June 1964, when it was fitted to the QGS31 Nissan Cedric.

=== SD22 ===
First appearing in 1963 the SD22 is a naturally aspirated 2.2 L (2,164 cc) inline-four diesel engine. It is a stroked version of the smaller SD20, lengthened to 100 mm (3.94 in). It produces 65 PS (48 kW) at 4,000 rpm as fitted to the 1983 430-series Nissan Cedric. It was first used in a passenger car with the 330-series Nissan Cedric from June 1977. It was also produced in a marine version MN 22 by Chrysler Marine under license during the 1980s.

The SD22 was used in the Datsun 720 pickup trucks from 1980 through 1983, where it produced 61 hp (45 kW) (SAE) at 4,000 rpm. Like its lesser SD20 relative (but unlike its SD33 six-cylinder derivative) it has three main bearings and was never available with turbocharging. In 1981, pistons were upgraded to a three ring piston with a steel compression ring carrier cast as part of the piston for improved durability.

The engine is popular in Australia utilized mostly as a reliable pump for remote livestock stations. The engine may still be manufactured and imported by JESCO in California. JESCO also supplies parts. The marine version, using a water-cooled exhaust manifold and expansion tank is also still available from other manufacturers.

Applications:

- 1963-1965 Nissan Caball QC141
- 1964-1970 Nissan Junior Q40, Q41
- 1965-1966 Nissan Caball QC142
- 1966-1971 Nissan Cedric 130
- 1966-1976 Nissan Caball C240 D4
- 1970-1982 Nissan Junior 140-series
- 1971-1975 Nissan Cedric R230
- 1976-1979 Nissan Cedric R330
- 1980-1983 Datsun 720
- Nissan Caravan/Homy RE20-series

=== SD23 ===
The SD23 is a 2.3 L (2,289 cc) straight four diesel engine with eight valves (two per cylinder), and a distributor type injection pump. It is a bored out version of the SD20, up to 89 mm (3.50 in). It produces 74 PS (54 kW; 73 hp) SAE net at 4,300 rpm and was fitted to the Nissan 720 and D21 Pickups, as well as the E23 Nissan Urvan and export market Y30-series Cedrics. The engine has also been used in many other functions, for forklifts, marine, and stationary applications. Unlike the smaller engines, the SD23 received a five bearing crankshaft. The European-spec version claimed 50 kW (68 PS), as fitted to the 1985 Urvan.

=== SD25 ===
The 2.5 L (2,488 cc) SD25 is the biggest version of the four-cylinder SD series, with the larger bore and stroke of 89 mm × 100 mm (3.50 in × 3.94 in). It was fitted to Nissan 720 pickup trucks 1983 through 1986 and D21 Nissan pickups (only 1986–1988). In some European markets it was also fitted to the Nissan Urvan and Cabstar. Featured five main bearing crankshaft and redesigned rear main seal.

== Straight-six ==
=== SD33 ===
The SD33 is a 3.2 L (3,245 cc; 198 cu in) straight-six diesel engine, most known for its use in the Nissan Patrol MQ (160 series) from 1980-1983 and the Nissan C80. The SD33 produces 95 PS (70 kW) at 3,800 rpm.

In a joint distribution venture with Chrysler started in 1969, this engine was marketed as the Chrysler-Nissan CN6-33 for marine use. Chrysler-Nissan engines were also installed in the International Scout, until the collaboration ended in 1978. The CN6-33 engines are painted yellow and have "Chrysler Nissan" on the valve covers.

The Engine was also used in the UD 3400 series light truck, large forklifts, Marine applications, in International Scout offerings from 1976 to 1979, as well as the Jeep CJ-10/Cj-10A flightline tow vehicles from 1985 to 1986. The Scout-based Monteverdi Sahara was also offered with the SD33.

=== SD33T ===
The SD33T is a turbocharged 3.2 L (3,245 cc; 198 cu in) straight-six diesel engine that was used in 1980 for the powerplant in 6,400 International Scout II's. All were equipped with a T-19 manual transmission.

From July 1983 until 1987, SD33T engines were fitted to the Nissan Patrol MK (160 series, facelift model). The SD33T produces 110 PS (81 kW; 108 hp) and 255 N⋅m (188 lb⋅ft) of torque.

== See also ==
- List of Nissan engines
