= Prince Miler =

Medium-sized pickup truck

The Prince Miler is a medium-sized pickup truck built by the Prince Motor Company. It remained on the market for four years after the 1966 merger, when Prince dealership chain became integrated within Nissan's organization as the Nissan Prince Store. By 1970, however, it was integrated with Nissan's newest generation of their offering in this class, the Junior.

== History ==
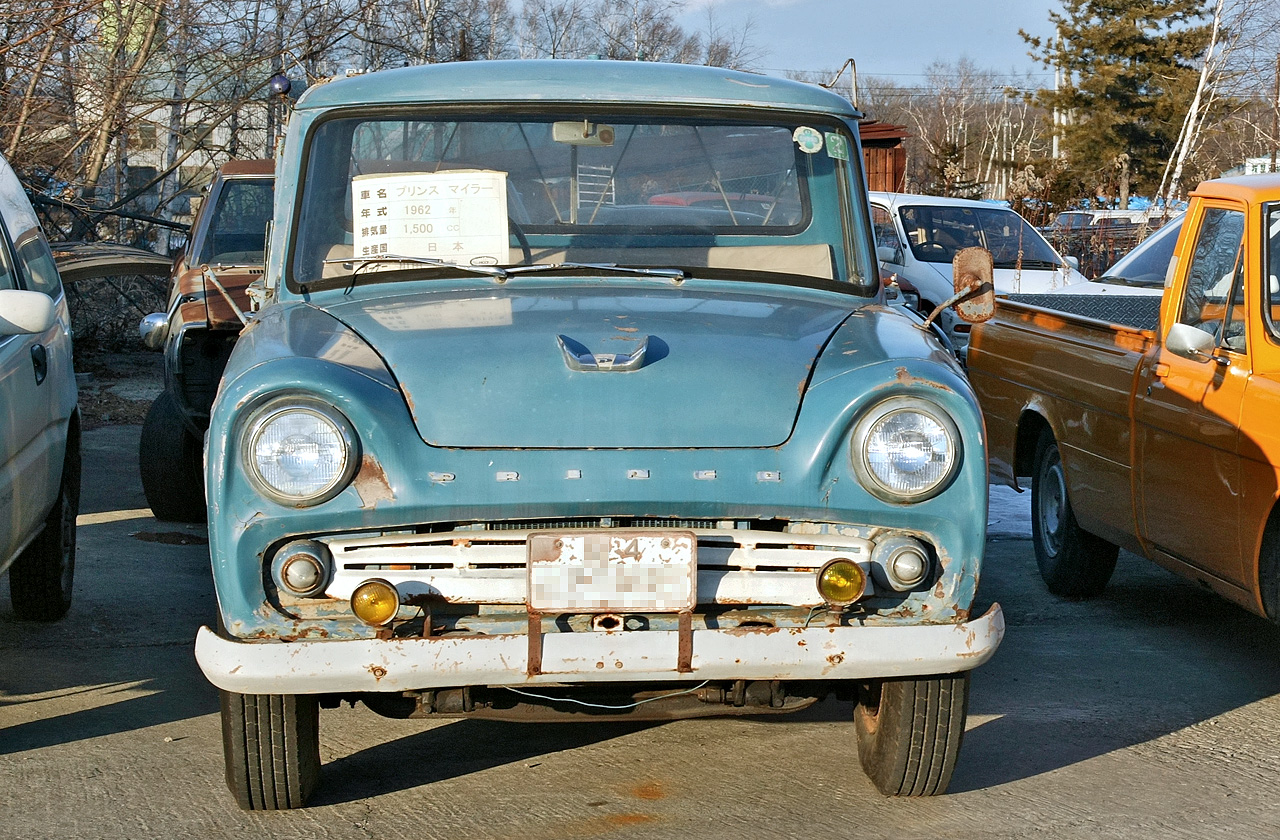
1962 Prince Lite Miler

In September 1957 Prince, the automotive branch of Fuji Precision Industries, introduced the three-seat Miler (AOTH-1/AQTH-1) as a successor to the 1952 Prince Truck (AFTF). Originally a 1.25 ton truck with a 1.5-liter, 45 PS (33 kW) four-cylinder (FG4), the AFTF truck went through eight iterations, culminating in a 1.5 ton, 60 PS version of the original. The first Milers, on a similar wheelbase, used the same GA30 engine but load capacity increased to 1,750 kg and the AOTH-1 had a slightly longer wheelbase and bed.

On May 4, 1958, the 'New Miler' (ARTH-1) was released. It too retained the GA30 engine and had the same maximum capacity, but with a much longer wheelbase and a longer and wider bed it was much more capable. This was also available with a dropside bed. This was replaced by the ARTH-2 in September 1959. The ARTH-2 received a 70 PS (51 kW) version of the 1.5 liter four, and by now there was also a "Light Miler" (1.25 ton) version available. The first few model years of the ARTH Miler were also available as the "Prince Light Van", a four-door, six-seater van with panelled sides in the luggage compartment.

In April 1961, the 1.9-litre ("GB" engine) "Super Miler" was added. This had an 80 PS (59 kW) engine, which was upgraded to 91 PS (67 kW) only six months later. By April 1962, only the 1.5-liter, 1.25-ton Light Miler and the big Super Miler remained, while the middle version was discontinued. The Super Miler was now rated for 2 tonnes (4,400 lb) and carried the BRTH-2 chassis code. A "Powr-Lok" differential became an available option four months later, and in September 1962 the front was updated with twin headlights and an altered grille as well as an interior update. This update meant all-new chassis codes, with the T430 being the "Light Miler" and the T431 the "Super Miler".

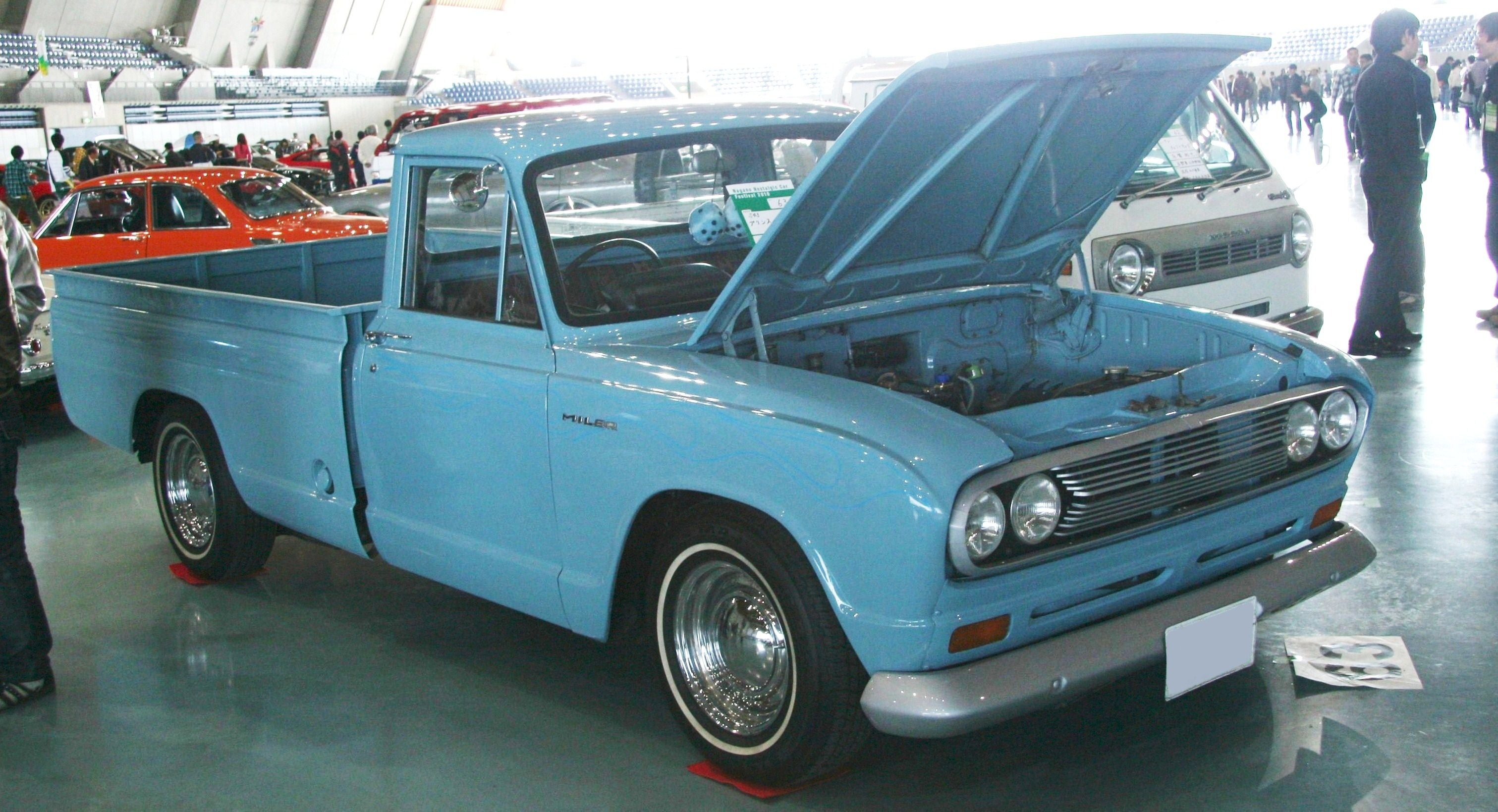
1968 Nissan Prince Light Miler T446

In July 1965 the T440 series (T441 for the Super Miler) appeared, now with independent double-wishbone front suspension. This was a first for the class in Japan, and together with a new 5-speed manual transmission and powerful engine it was a stand-alone in its class. The same two inline-four cylinder OHV engines of 1,862 cc (now the "G2") and 1,484 cc ("G1"). Payloads remained as before. In 1967, after the merger with Nissan, the trucks were sold as the "Nissan Prince Light Miler" (T446) and "Nissan Prince Miler" (T447). The changes were mostly related to the powertrain, which was now shared with the Nissan Junior: a 1,595 cc OHV R engine for the Light Miler and the 2-litre OHV H20 in the Super Miler. The transmission was downgraded to a four-speed unit.

In 1970 Miler production ended and replaced with the 140 series Nissan Miler, which was nothing more than a rebadged Nissan Junior.
