= Zamyad Co. =

Iranian commercial vehicle manufacturing company

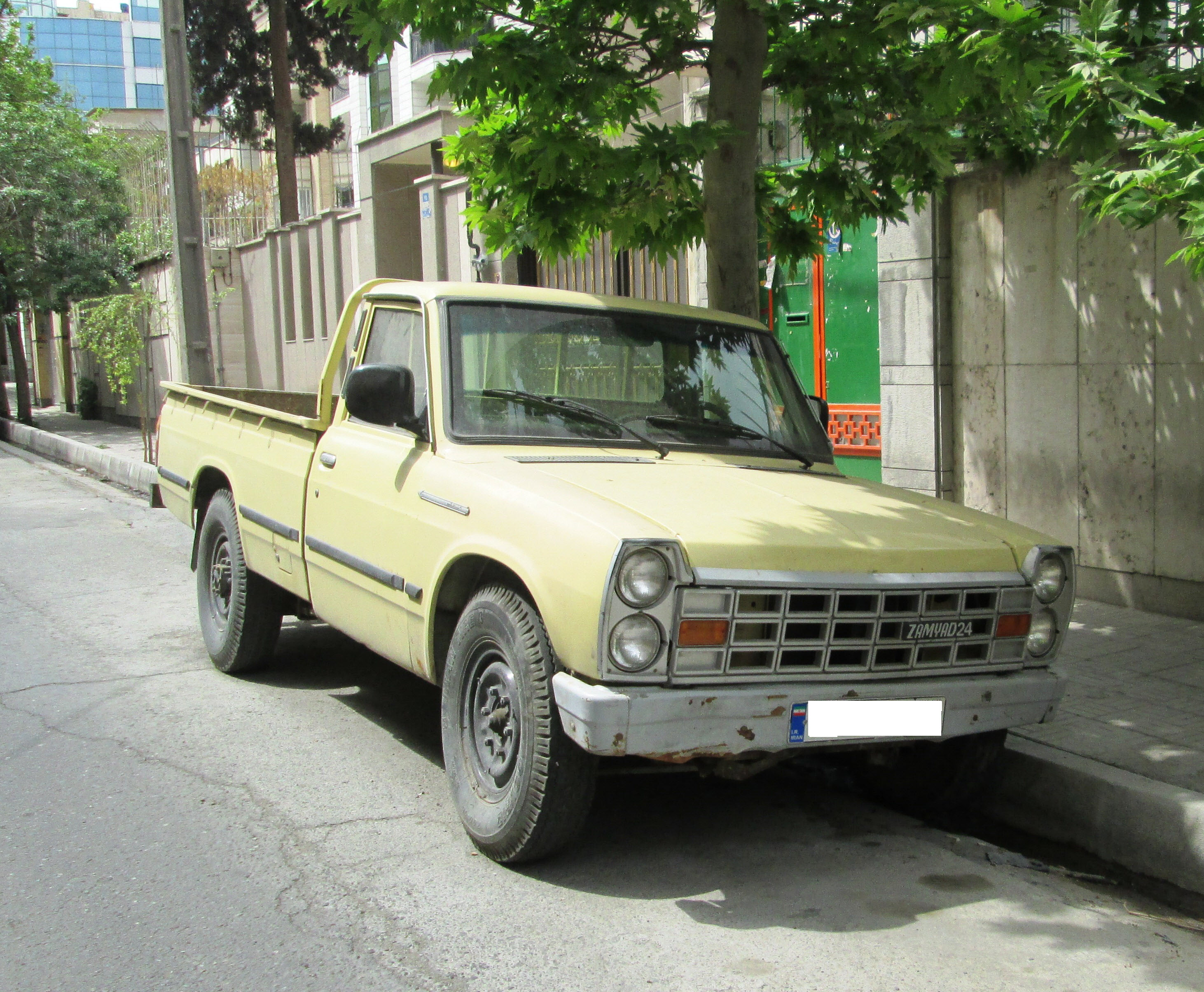
Nissan Junior 3rd generation (Zamyad 24), Iranian built photographed in Tehran, Iran.

Zamyad. (Persian: خودروسازی زامیاد, Xodrosāzi-ye Zāmyād) is an Iranian commercial vehicle manufacturing company. It was founded in 1963 as part of the RENA Industrial Group in Tehran. In 1963, the company began producing Volvo N-Model trucks, and in 1970, started production of Nissan Junior 2000 pickup. In 1998, SAIPA took over the Zamyad company, who then undertook the production of the Z24, a license built version of the 1970-1980 Nissan Junior with a 2.4-litre engine. Since 2003, this truck has been sold under the Zamyad brand. Zamyad currently produces a rebodied version of the Z24 called the Shooka.

== Products ==
- Zamyad Stralis
- Zamyad A36-15
- Zamyad Padra
- Zamyad Shooka
- Zamyad Z24

== Environmental concerns ==
The company's manufacturing plant in southeast Tehran was the focus of a 2006 study of the use of treated wastewater in agriculture.

== See also ==
- Iranian car industry
