= Nissan H engine =

Overview
- Manufacturer: Nissan Motors
- Production: 1954–2003

Layout
- Configuration: Inline-4 & Inline-6
- Displacement: 1.5–3.0 L (1,489–2,974 cc)
- Cylinder bore: 73 mm (2.87 in); 85 mm (3.35 in); 87.2 mm (3.43 in); 92 mm (3.62 in)
- Piston stroke: 66 mm (2.6 in); 83 mm (3.27 in); 89 mm (3.5 in); 93 mm (3.66 in)
- Cylinder block material: Cast iron
- Cylinder head material: Cast iron; Aluminum (later versions)
- Valvetrain: OHV; SOHC (U20)
- Compression ratio: 8.0:1–9.0:1

Combustion
- Fuel system: Carburetor
- Fuel type: Gasoline
- Cooling system: Water-cooled

Output
- Power output: 50–152 PS (37–112 kW; 49–150 hp)
- Torque output: 159–221 N⋅m (117–163 lb⋅ft)

Chronology
- Predecessor: Nissan G engine

The Nissan H series of automobile engines is an evolution of the Nissan "R" engine which was based on the 1.5-liter, three-main bearing "G" engine used in the 1960s. Both inline-four and inline-six versions were produced. It is a pushrod OHV design with iron block, early models with an iron head, later models with aluminum head. Versions of this motor have been used in many Nissan autos and forklifts, well into the eighties and a version called H20II was in production until 2003. The SD diesels are based on this series of motors (bore spacing and basic block layout)

== Inline-4 ==
=== 1H ===
The 1H is not related to the later H engines. It was also an all-iron, OHV engine, but this was a licensed BMC (Austin) B engine. With a bore and stroke of 73 mm × 89 mm (2.87 in × 3.50 in) it displaced 1.5 L (1,489 cc), power was 50 PS (37 kW; 49 hp) at 4,400 rpm in 1956, but this increased to 57 PS (42 kW; 56 hp) in August 1958. The license agreement terminated in the late 1950s and the Nissan G engine was a more compact replacement, which in turn became replaced by the (below) Nissan H engines. The 1H would also be de-stroked from 89mm to 59mm to become the 1.0 L (990 cc) to create the Nissan C engine at the suggestion of former Willys-Overland engineer Donald Stone.

Applications:

- 1954–1959 Nissan Austin
- 1956–1960 Nissan Junior B40/42

=== H ===
The basic H is a 1.9 L (1,883 cc) engine produced from 1962 for Nissan's Cedric. Bore and stroke was 85 mm × 83 mm (3.35 in × 3.27 in). The 8.0:1 compression version produced 92 hp (69 kW; 93 PS) and 159 N⋅m (117 lb⋅ft), while a high-compression engine (8.5:1) produced 95 hp (71 kW; 96 PS) and 163 N⋅m (120 lb⋅ft).

Applications:

- 1962 Nissan Cedric 31 (high-compression)
- 1962–1965 Nissan Junior 40
- 1962–1965 Nissan Caball C141
- 1962–1966 Nissan Echo GC141

=== H20 ===
The H20 is the most-common member of the family. Displacing 2.0 L (1,982 cc) thanks to a larger 87.2 mm (3.43 in) bore, H20 engines produced around 99 hp (74 kW; 100 PS) and 167 N⋅m (123 lb⋅ft).

Applications:

- 1965–1971 Nissan Cedric 130
- 1966–1970 Nissan Junior 41
- 1966–1967 Nissan Caball C142
- 1966–1972 Nissan Clipper T65
- 1967–1976 Nissan Caball C240
- 1971–1975 Nissan Cedric 230
- 1971–1975 Nissan Junior 140
- 1975–1982 Nissan Junior 141
- 1976–1979 Nissan Cedric 330
- 1979–1983 Nissan Cedric 430
- 1970s Yue Loong Cedric 803 (91 PS or 67 kW or 90 hp at 4,800 rpm)
- Nissan Caravan/Homy
- 1980–1982 Nissan Urvan

Also N230S, T40, forklifts and other machinery

=== H15 ===
The H15 is an improved, smaller version of the H20-II. It was used in forklifts.

Applications:

- Nissan J-type forklift (J01M09, J01A15, etc.)

=== H20-II ===
The H20-II is an improved version of the H20. It was used in forklifts.

Applications:

- Nissan J-type forklifts (J02M20, J01A30, etc.)

=== H20P ===
The H20P is the LPG-powered version of the H20.

Applications:

- 1976–1979 Nissan Cedric 330
- 1975–1979 Nissan Gloria 330

=== H25 ===
The H25 was developed as a high-output version of the H20-II. This engine was used in forklifts.

2.5 L (2,472 cc) bore × stroke: 92 mm × 93 mm (3.62 in × 3.66 in).

- compression ratio 8.7:1
- maximum output (gross) 62 bhp (46 kW; 63 PS) at 3200 rpm
- maximum torque (gross) 132 lb⋅ft (179 N⋅m; 18.2 kg⋅m) at 1600 rpm

=== R (H16) ===
The R engine used essentially the same block as the H20, but a 17 mm (0.67 in) shorter piston stroke resulted in a capacity reduction of 387 cc (23.6 cu in). The R was later named H16. The "R" motor made the switch from 3 to 5 main bearings in 1967 for improved reliability, and the H20 was developed from this arrangement. The R/H16 bore and stroke is 87.2 mm × 66.8 mm (3.43 in × 2.63 in) displacing 1.6 L (1,595 cc). With 9.0:1 compression, the engine produced 96 hp (72 kW; 97 PS) and 103 lb⋅ft (140 N⋅m).

Applications:

- 1965–1967 Nissan Bluebird R411 SSS
- 1965–1968 Nissan Silvia CSP311
- 1967–1970 Datsun Sports SP311/SPL311
- 1968–1972 Nissan Homer T641

=== U20 ===
The U20 was similar to the H20 but with an SOHC cylinder head for motorsports applications. Although Prince Motor Company is credited in many sources with designing the U20, it was actually designed in-house at Nissan by Kenichi Sasaki. The U20 was produced in two forms: a stock 135 hp (137 PS) version with twin SU carburetors, or a 150 hp (152 PS) version with twin Mikuni/Solex carburetors and a "B" model camshaft.

Applications:

- 1967.5–1970 Datsun Sports SR311

== Straight-6 ==
=== K ===
The K engine is a 2.8 L (2,825 cc) straight-6 engine produced from 1963 to 1965. The K engine is an H engine with two extra cylinders. The K engine produces 115 PS (85 kW; 113 hp) at 4,400 rpm, 21.0 kg⋅m (206 N⋅m; 152 lb⋅ft) at 2,400 rpm.

Applications:

- 1963–1965 Nissan Cedric Special 50

=== H30 ===
The H30 is a 3.0 L (2,974 cc) straight-6 version produced from 1965. Output ranged from 120 to 130 PS (88 to 96 kW) and torque is 163 lb⋅ft (221 N⋅m). The H30 is an H20 with two extra cylinders.

Applications:

- 1965–1973 Nissan President 150
- 1973–1975 Nissan President 250
- 1966–1976 Nissan C80

This engine is used in large forklifts

== See also ==
- List of Nissan engines
- Nissan G engine
