= Millery =

Millery may refer to the following places in France:

- Millery, Côte-d'Or, a commune in the Côte-d'Or department
- Millery, Meurthe-et-Moselle, a commune in the Meurthe-et-Moselle department
- Millery, Rhône, a commune in the Rhône department
