= Mailer (surname) =

Mailer is a surname. Notable people with the surname include:

- John Buffalo Mailer (born 1978), author, playwright and journalist
- Kate Mailer (born 1962), American stage and film actress
- Michael Mailer (born 1964), film producer
- Norman Mailer (1923–2007), American novelist, journalist, essayist, poet, playwright, screenwriter, and film director
- Ron Mailer (1932–2018), Scottish footballer
- Susan Mailer (born 1949), American psychoanalyst
- Stephen Mailer (born 1966), American stage and screen actor

== See also ==
- Lee B. Mailler (1898–1967), New York politician
