= Central Mailer =

A Central Mailer can be:

- the coordinator of an amateur press association (APA)
- the distributor of external publications received by a learned society
- an email hub, used by an Electronic mailing list manager or sub-domain coordinator
