= Nissan Atlas =

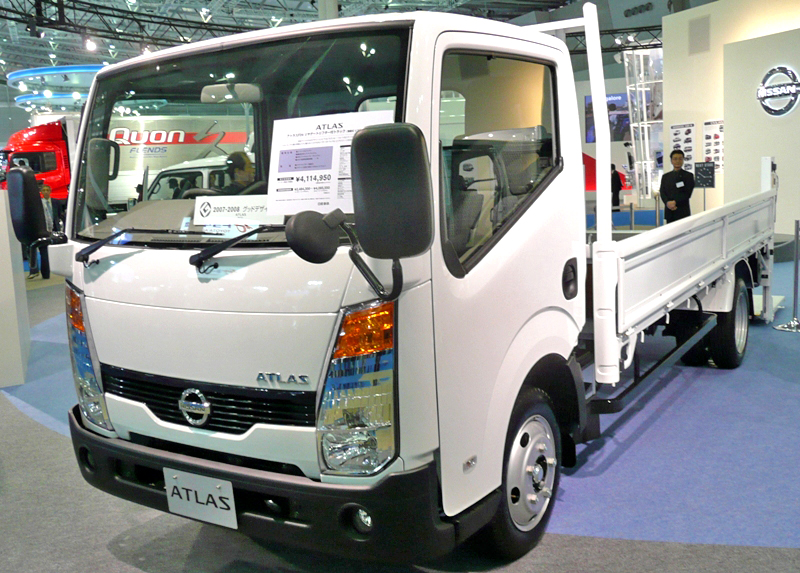

Overview
- Manufacturer: Nissan Shatai; UD Trucks; Isuzu; Ashok Leyland; Renault
- Also called: Nissan Cabstar; Nissan Homer (Turkey); UD 1200/1300/1400 (North America); UD Atlas (Japan); UD Condor (Japan); UD Kazet (H44/F26); Ashok Leyland Partner (India); Ashok Leyland Garuda (India, military variants); Dong Feng Captain N300 (China); Isuzu Elf (H41/H42/H43/F25/F26); Mazda Titan (H41/H42/H43/F25/F26); Mitsubishi Fuso Canter (H44); Renault Maxity (Europe); Samsung SV110/Yamuzin (South Korea); Yue Loong/Yulon Homer (ROC)
- Production: 1982–present

Body and chassis
- Class: Truck
- Body style: Truck (standard cab, crew cab)
- Related: Nissan Diesel Condor S

Powertrain
- Transmission: Nissan (manual); Aisin (automatic)

Chronology
- Predecessor: Nissan Cabstar, Homer (light); Nissan C80 (medium); Nissan Caball, Clipper (heavy)

The Nissan Atlas (Japanese: 日産・アトラス) is a series of pickup trucks and light commercial vehicles manufactured by Nissan. It is built by UD Trucks for the Japanese market, and by the Renault-Nissan Alliance for the European market. The lighter range vehicles, weighing from 1 to 1.5 tons, replaced the earlier Cabstar and Homer (F20), while the heavier Caball and Clipper (C340) were replaced by the 2-to-4 ton range Atlas. The Atlas nameplate was first introduced in December 1981, available at Nissan Store locations.

The Atlas is known also as the Nissan Cabstar, Renault Maxity, Samsung SV110/Yamuzin and Ashok Leyland Partner depending on the location. The range has been sold around the world.

== F22/H40 ==
=== Japan ===
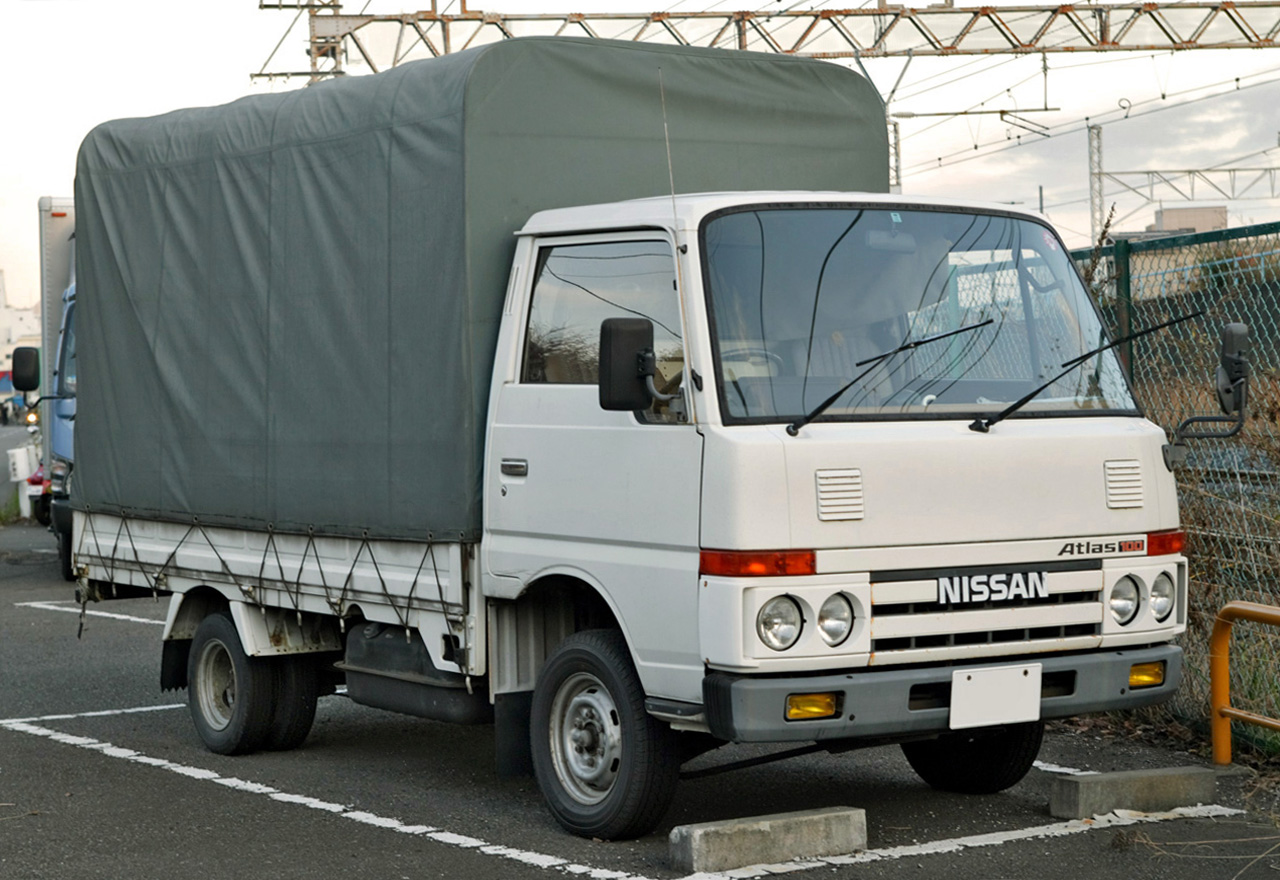
Nissan Atlas 100 single cab (F22)

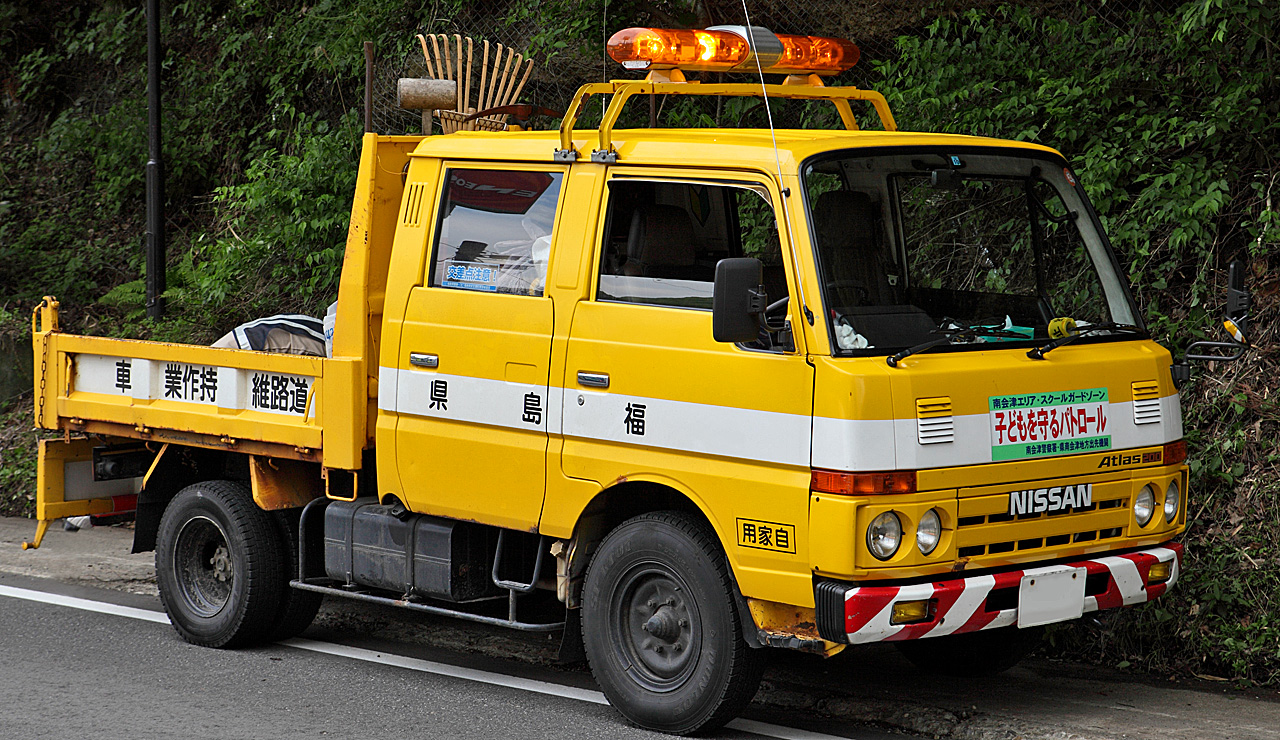
Nissan Atlas 200 double cab (F22)

Manufacturing of the heavier range (H40-series) began in December 1981, while the lighter series Atlas (F22) was introduced in February 1982. The first generation Atlas was available with a wide range of petrol and diesel engines: The Z16 and Z20 (as well as the LPG-powered Z20D) were petrol units, while diesels included the TD23, TD27, ED33, FD35, and the turbodiesel FD35T.

Mahindra uses the Atlas F22/H40 cabin for the Jayo truck model.

=== Europe ===
The Atlas F22 was sold in Europe as the Nissan Cabstar and proved a popular truck in the UK market due to its reliability and ability to carry weight. The F22 Cabstar was available in the British market with the 1,952 cc Z20S OHC petrol engine. From 1990 the range widened and was sold as the Cabstar E. In Taiwan, the F22 continued to be sold as the "Yue Loong Homer".

It was also used as recreational truck (motorhome conversions). It proved to be serious competition for the dated Bedford CF and Ford Transit which were its main competitors. The trucks popularity in the African market saw vast majority of the remaining early UK F22 models being exported to Africa.

=== Australia ===
Australia was another important market for the Atlas, where it took over after the previous Nissan Caball which was sold there from 1970 to 1981. It was later marketed as the Nissan Cabstar (1984–1992). It was built in Australia using many local components.

== F23/H41 ==
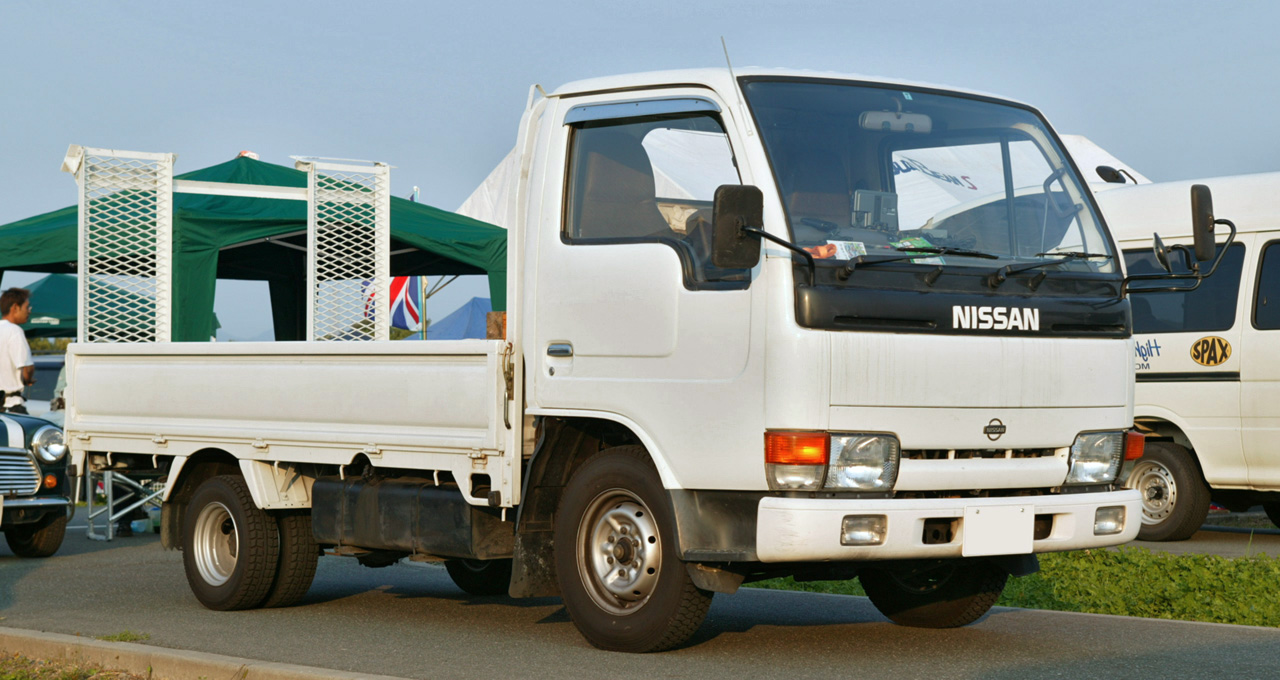
Nissan Atlas 10

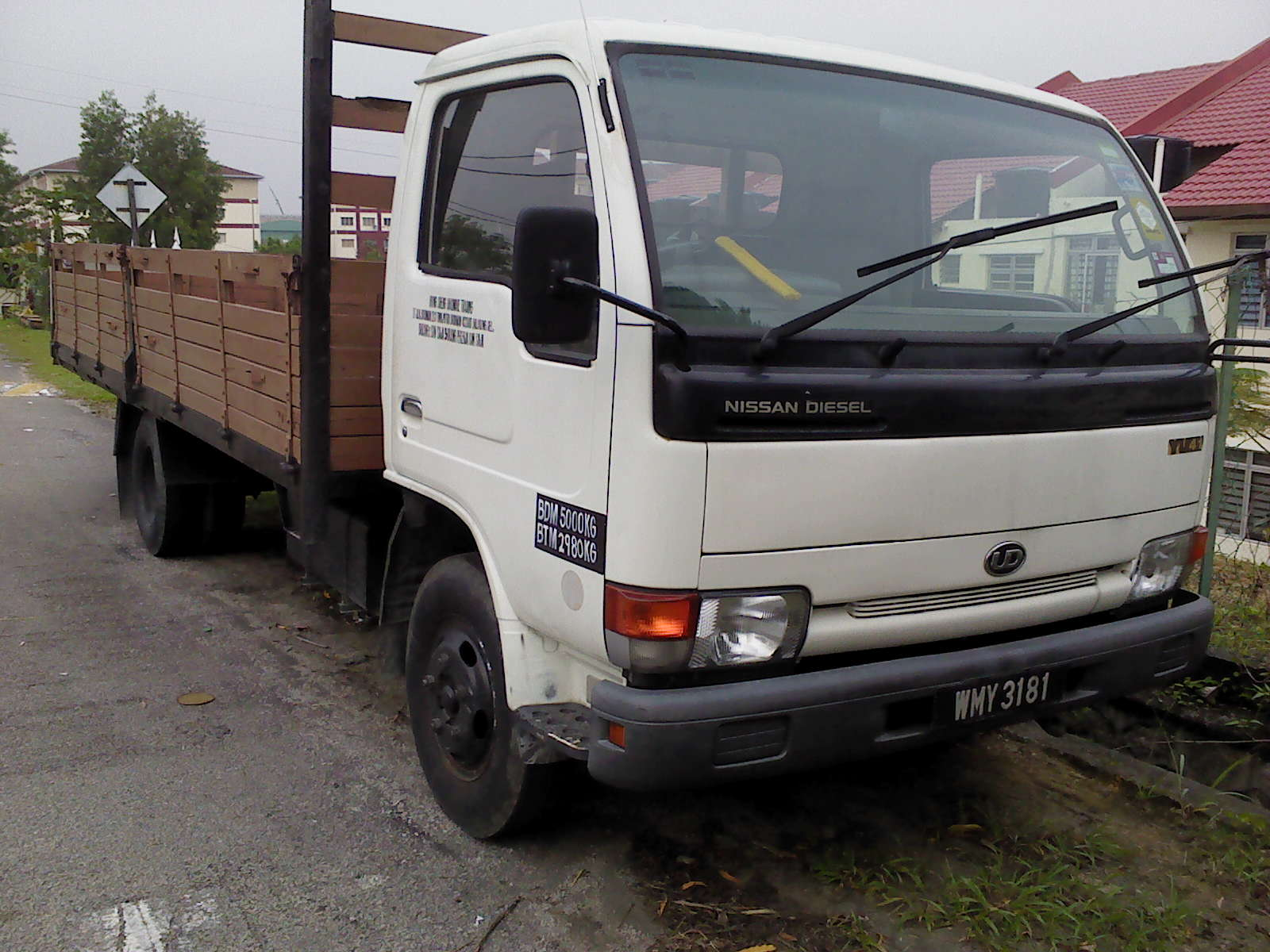
UD YU41 (Nissan Atlas H41 in Malaysia)

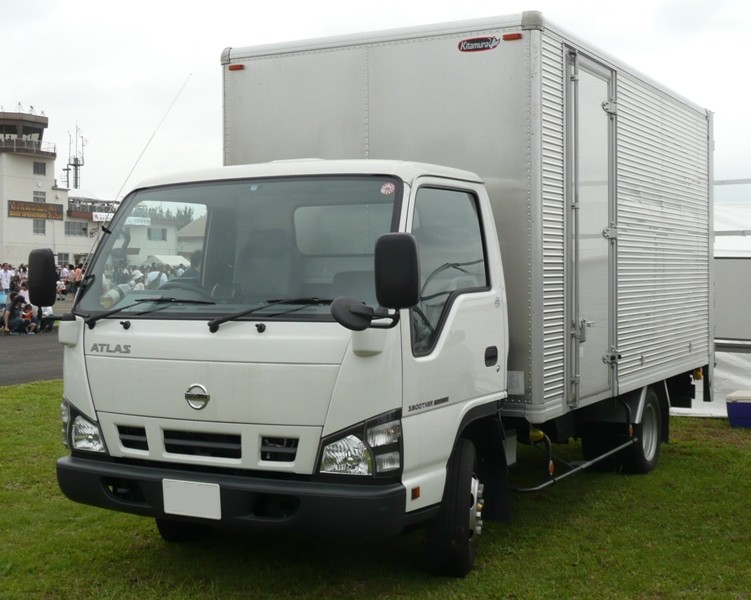
Nissan Atlas H41 Face-lifted

The H41 was launched in 1991 with the light duty F23 launched in 1992. The H42 followed in 1995.

=== North America ===
The UD 1400 was similar to the Atlas F23 featuring a 4.7-liter, 175 hp (130 kW) turbo-diesel MD-175 four-cylinder engine and was available until 2010. The MD-175 was actually a Hino J05D-TF engine provided for Nissan.

=== South Africa ===
The Atlas F23 is sold as the UD 35 and UD 40 Series and features a 4.2 L 6-cylinder turbo diesel engine producing 87 kW

=== South Korea ===
In South Korea, the locally built version was launched in 1998 as Samsung SV110. It later changed its name to Yamuzin (Hangul:야무진). South Korean truck drivers, however, expect to be able to overload their vehicles, which the Atlas could not handle very well. Unlike the Hyundai Porter and Kia Bongo, the Yamuzin's cargo space can't hold the overload. In 2000 Samsung commercial vehicles discontinued their lineup due to bankruptcy.

=== China ===
In China, this cabin has been built by the Yuejin Light Truck Co. since the early 2000s. In export markets, this model is sometimes sold as the Hiliner.

== H42 ==
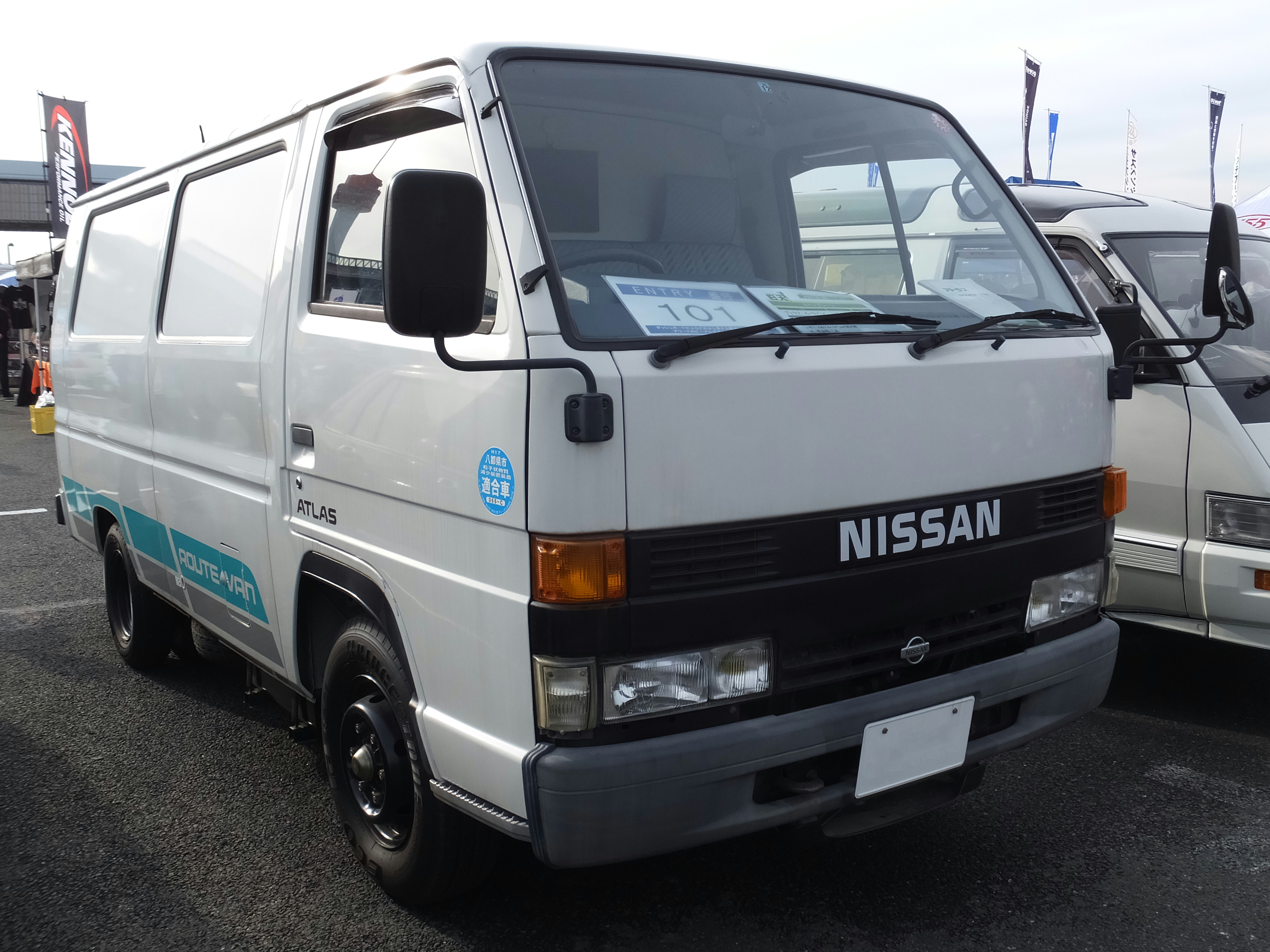
Nissan Atlas Route Van (H42)

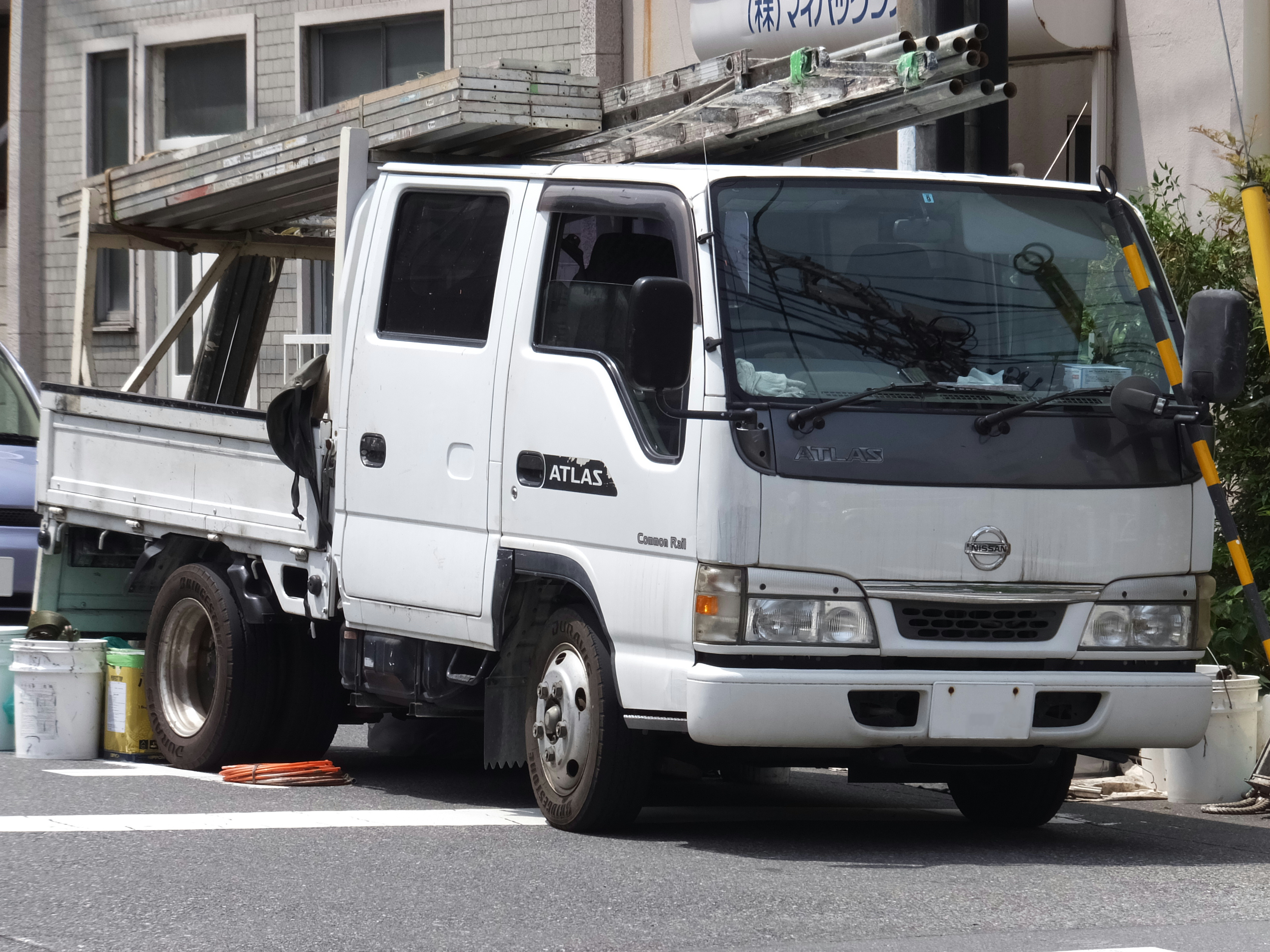
Nissan Atlas Double-Cab (H42)

The H42 (or UD20/30/35) was a rebadged Isuzu Elf truck sold from 1995 through 2007.

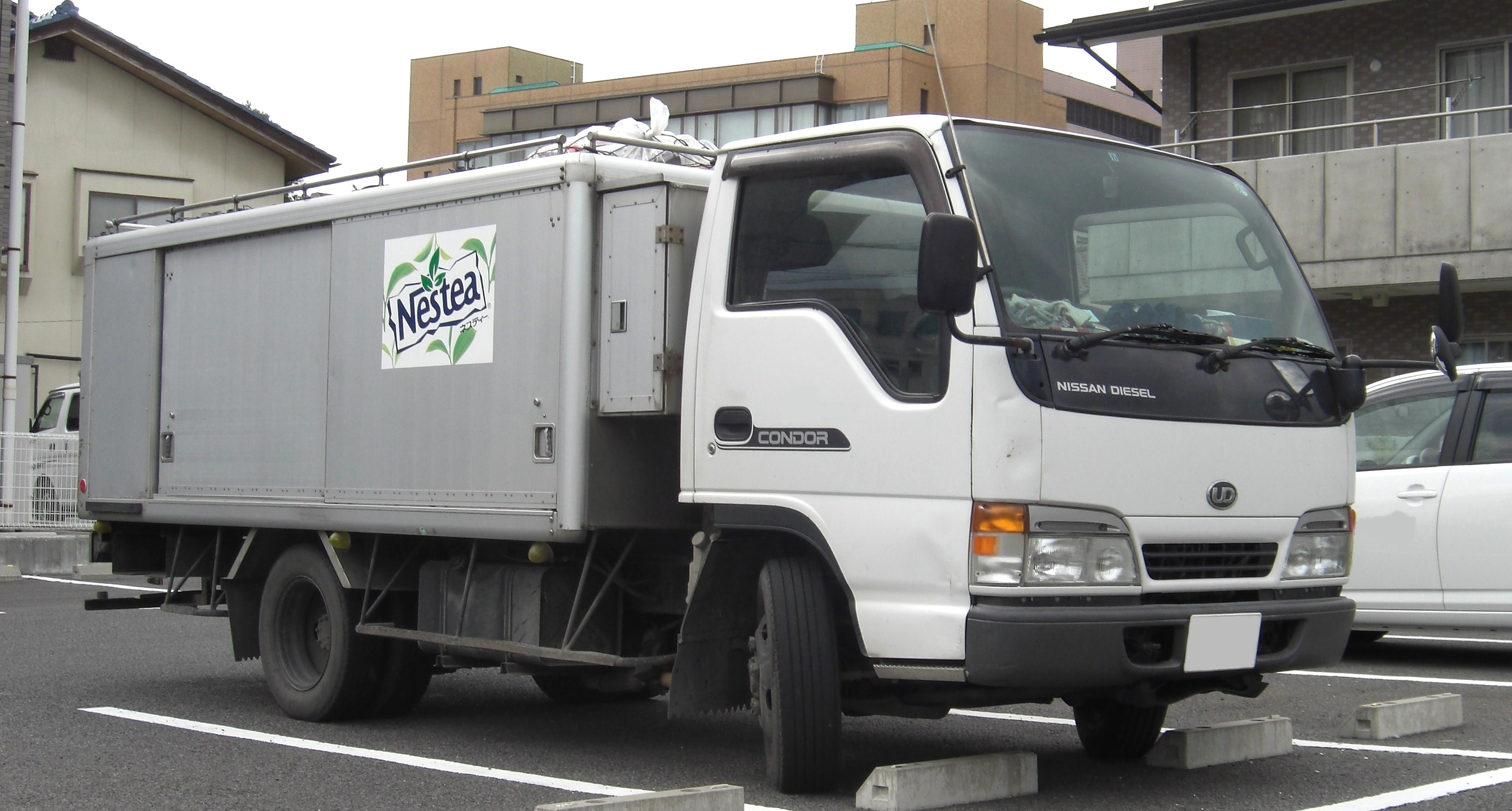
An Nestle UD 20/30/35 "Condor" (rebadged Nissan Atlas H42 or Isuzu Elf)

== F24/H43 ==
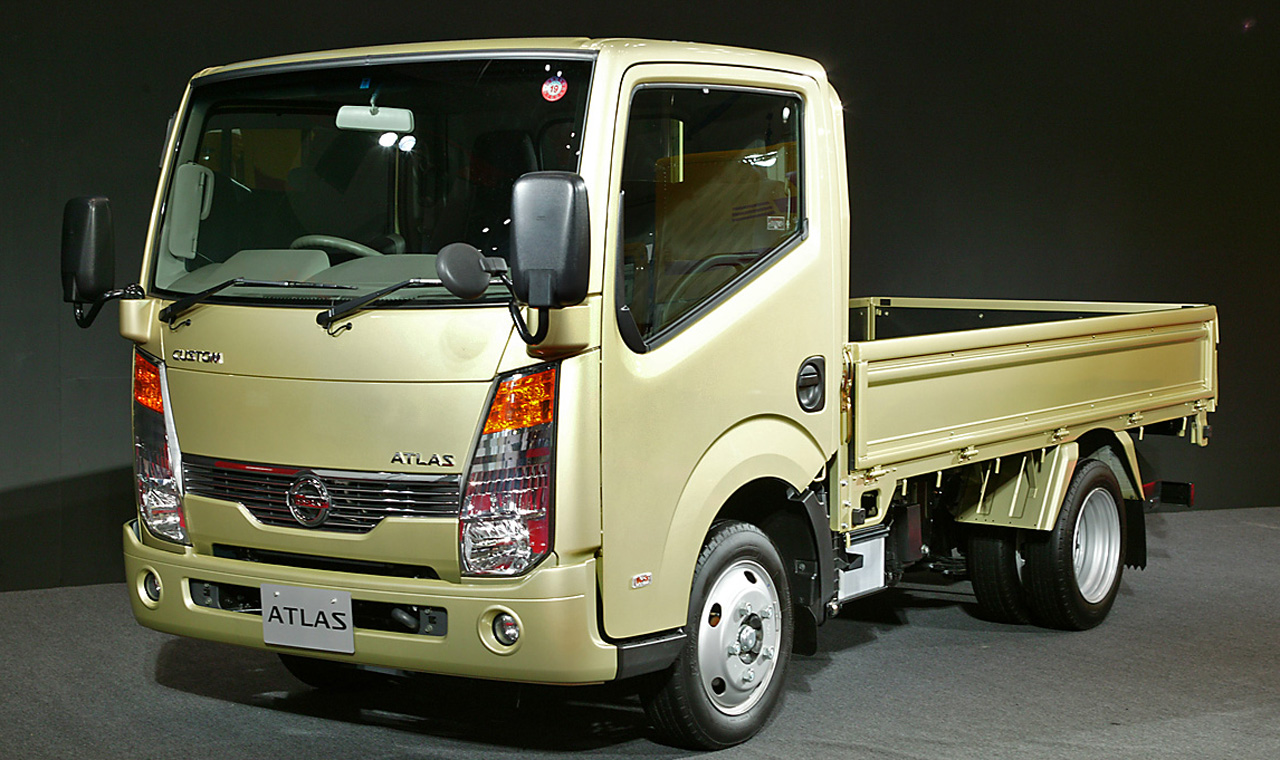
Nissan Atlas F24

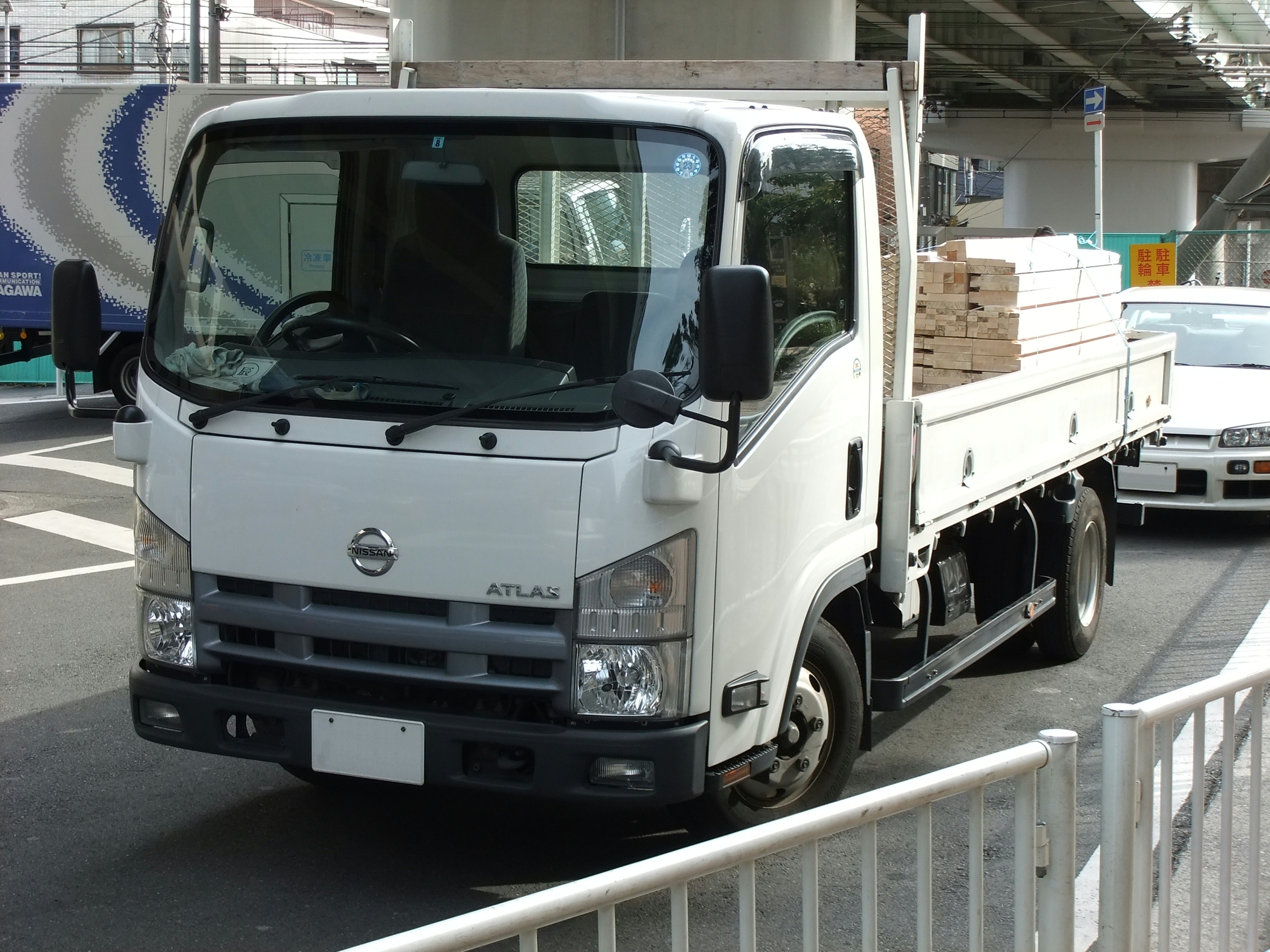
Nissan Atlas H43

=== Japan ===
The Atlas is available in two versions: the F24 and H43. The F24 is known as the Atlas 10 and is available with a 2.0 L petrol and 3.0 L turbo diesel engines with a range of payloads from 1.15 to 2 tons and was launched in June 2007. The H43 Atlas 20 (January 2007) comes in a wide range of versions with a choice of 3.0 L or 5.2 L diesel and a payload from 1.65 to 4.5 tons in rear wheel drive and four wheel drive options. The H43 is also marketed as the UD Condor (light-duty). The H43 is a rebadged Isuzu Elf.

From January 2011, production of the F24 transferred from UD to Nissan Shatai. As the F24 Atlas did not meet the 2018 emissions standards (meaning that the truck missed out on available tax breaks), production ended in 2021 and sales halted in June of that year. This marked the end of Nissan's truck production, although the Atlas nameplate continues to be available on OEM rebadgings from Mitsubishi and Isuzu.

=== China ===
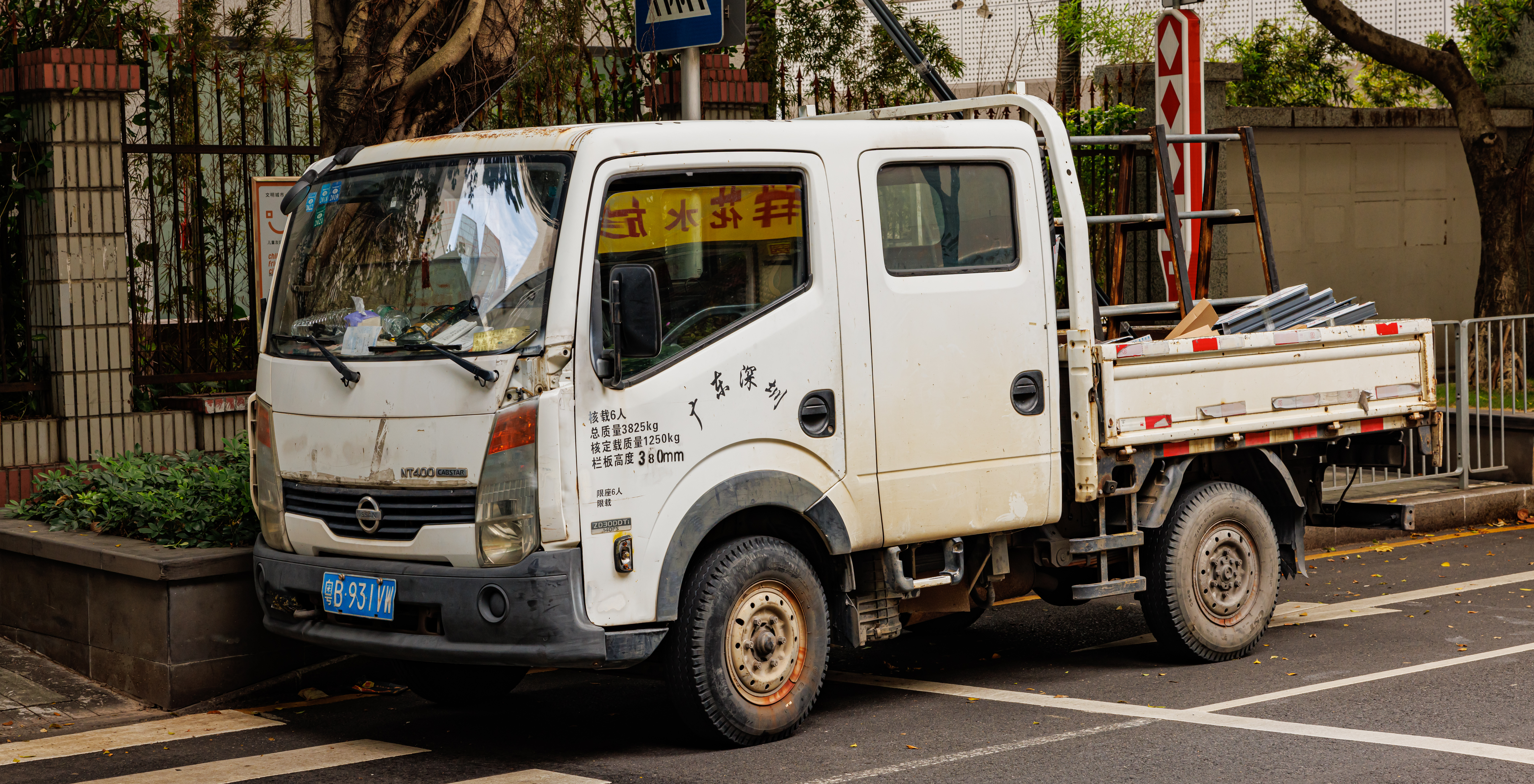
Nissan Atlas Cabstar NT400 double cab (F24)

The Dongfeng Captain N300 was publicly released in 2011, which uses a Nissan ZD30 engine.

=== India ===
The F24 is also marketed in India as of 2014 as the Ashok Leyland Partner (used for the Civilian variants) and the Ashok Leyland Garuda (used for the Military variants).

=== Europe ===
Since 2007 the Atlas F24 continued to be sold as the Nissan Cabstar, replacing the F23 in Europe. Built on the same Spanish Renault-Nissan Alliance production line as the Renault Maxity, the Cabstar uses the same Nissan YD25DDTi 2.5 L Turbo diesel engine in a choice of 110 hp or 130 hp versions and a Nissan ZD30DDTi 3.0 Turbo Diesel engine producing 150 hp.

=== North America ===
UD Trucks did not import the new F24 to the United States but in 2008 exports to Mexico from the new San Yi, Taiwan factory commenced, using the Nissan Cabstar name. It replaced the Spanish-sourced Cabstars which had been sent to Mexico since the previous year.

=== Malaysia ===
The F24 is marketed in Malaysia as Nissan Atlas by Combine Motor Sdn Bhd in 2016, Nissan Atlas is available in two variants, single cab and double cab. All are fully imported from Japan.

== H44 ==
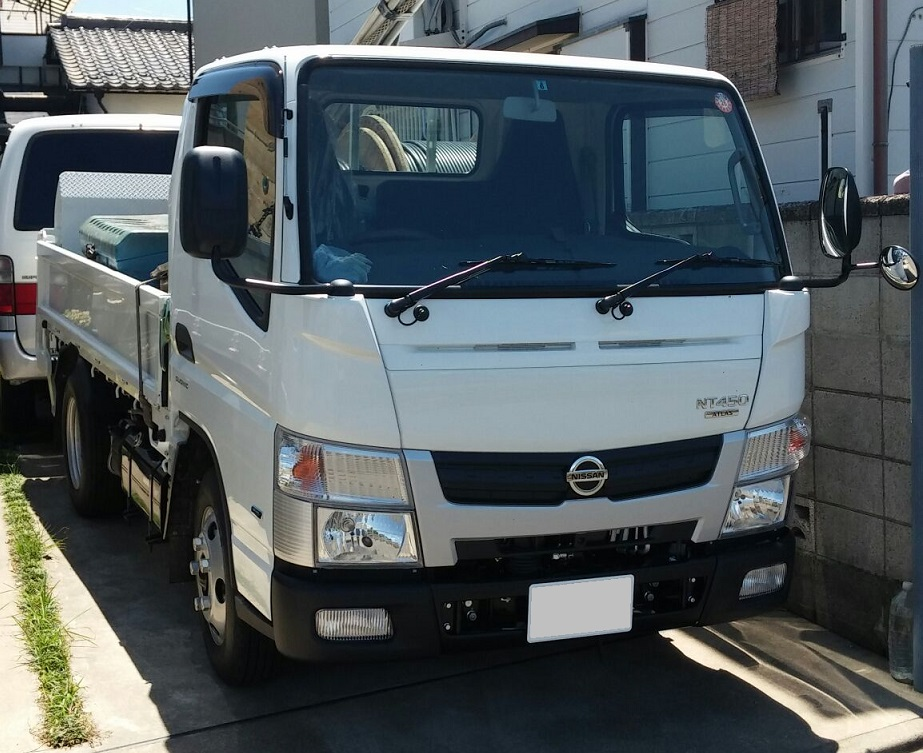
Nissan NT450 Atlas (H44)

The NT450 Atlas remained supplied by OEM manufacturers, but the basis was changed from the Isuzu Elf to the Mitsubishi Fuso Canter for this generation.

== F25 ==
The F25 Nissan Altas was a rebadged version of 5th generation Isuzu Elf facelift sold from 2019 to 2023, it came with 1.5 ton and 2 ton variant.

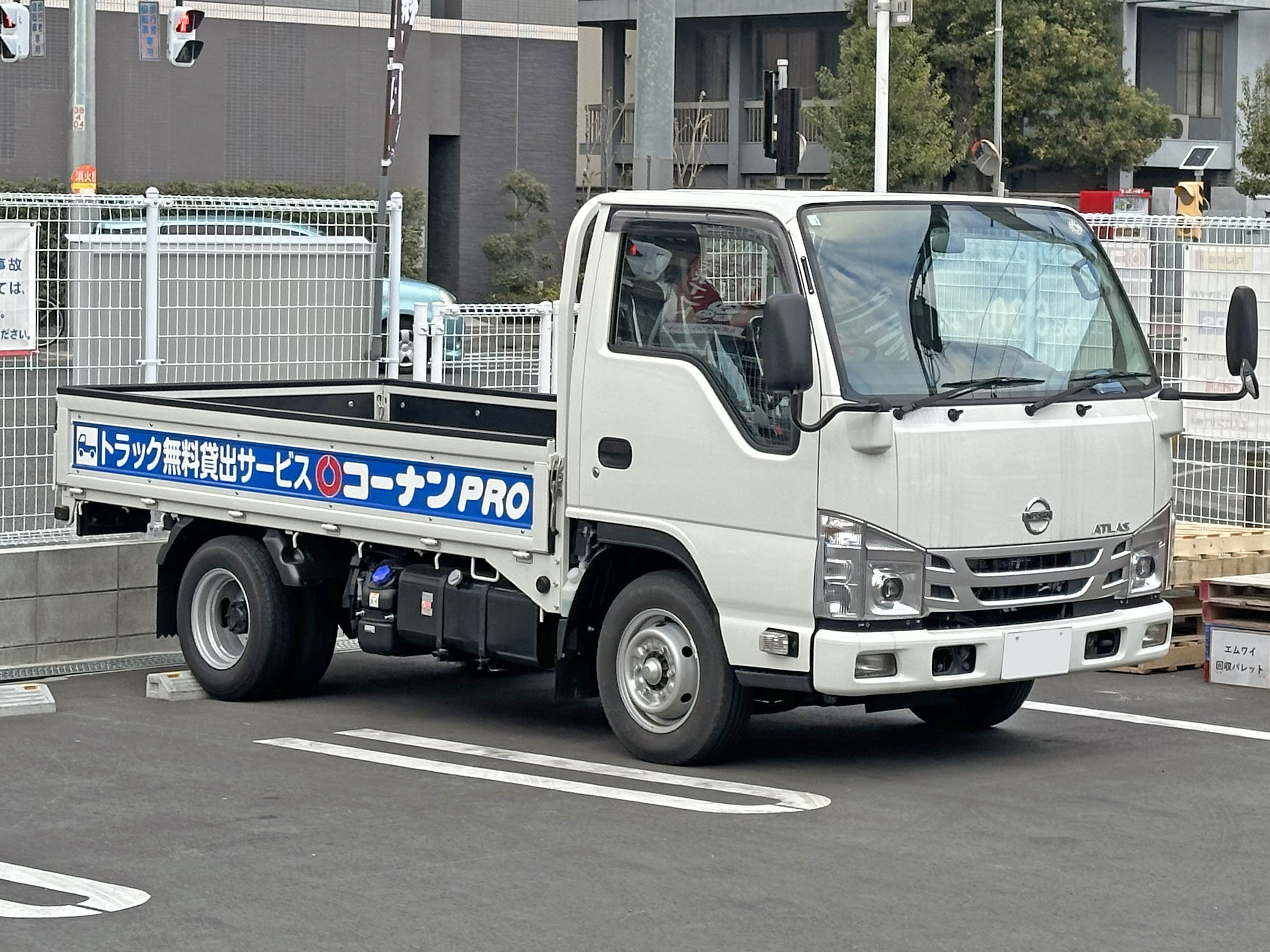
Nissan ATLAS 1.5t Class (F25)

== F26 ==
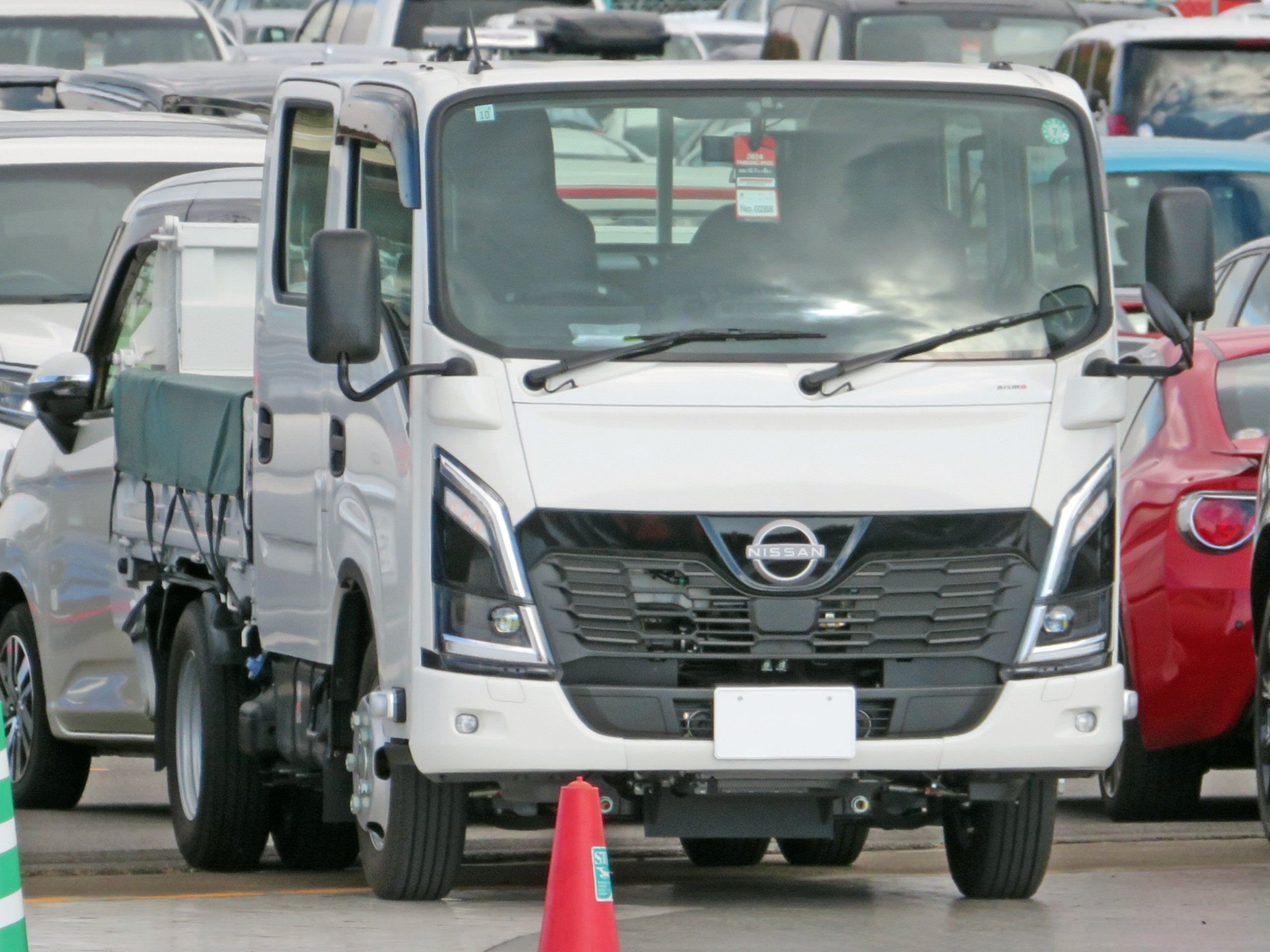
Nissan Atlas (F26)

The F26 Nissan Atlas was launched in Japan on 25 September 2023, a rebadged version of 7th generation Isuzu Elf.
