= Nissan FD engine =

FD engine

Overview
- Also called: ED engine

Layout
- Configuration: Inline-4
- Displacement: 3.3–4.6 L (3,298–4,617 cc)

Combustion
- Turbocharger: On some versions
- Fuel system: swirl chamber (ED); direct injection (FD)
- Fuel type: Diesel
- Cooling system: Water-cooled

Output
- Power output: 100–135 PS (74–99 kW; 99–133 bhp)
- Torque output: 23.5–33.5 kg⋅m (230–329 N⋅m; 170–242 lb⋅ft)

The Nissan FD engine is used primarily for Nissan Truck and Bus commercial vehicles. It is of an inline-four layout. The FD is a direct injection development of the earlier, swirl chamber ED engine with which it shares engine dimensions.

== ED engine ==
The ED engine first appeared in the early 1970s in 3.0-litre, ED30 form. This swirl chamber diesel formed the basis for the later, direct injection FD engines. A 3.3-litre ED33 and 3.5-litre ED35 variant were also developed, both of which received FD family counterparts unlike the smaller version.

== FD33 ==
- 3.3 L (3,298 cc)

100 PS (74 kW; 99 bhp) at 3600 rpm
23.5 kg⋅m (230 N⋅m; 170 lb⋅ft) at 2000 rpm

Nissan Atlas (H40) 1984–1986

=== FD33T ===
- turbodiesel

120 PS (88 kW; 118 bhp) at 3600 rpm
29 kg⋅m (284 N⋅m; 210 lb⋅ft) at 2000 rpm

Nissan Atlas (H40) 1983–1986
Nissan Civilian (W40) 1984–1988

== FD35 ==
- 3.5 L (3,465 cc)

105 PS (77 kW; 104 bhp) at 3500 rpm
25 kg⋅m (245 N⋅m; 181 lb⋅ft) at 2000 rpm

Nissan Atlas (H40) 1986–1991

=== FD35T ===
- turbodiesel

130 PS (96 kW; 128 bhp) at 3500 rpm
30 kg⋅m (294 N⋅m; 217 lb⋅ft) at 2000 rpm

Nissan Atlas (SGH40) 1986–1991

== FD42 ==
- 4.2 L (4,214 cc)

125 PS (92 kW; 123 bhp) at 3200 rpm
30.5 kg⋅m (299 N⋅m; 221 lb⋅ft) at 2000 rpm

Nissan Atlas (H41) 1991–1995

== FD46 ==
- 4.6 L (4,617 cc)

DOHC 8-valve

135 PS (99 kW; 133 bhp) at 3000 rpm
33.5 kg⋅m (329 N⋅m; 242 lb⋅ft) at 1800 rpm

Nissan Atlas (H41) 1991–1995

=== FD46T ===
turbodiesel

185 PS (136 kW; 182 bhp) at 3000 rpm
47.0 kg⋅m (461 N⋅m; 340 lb⋅ft) at 1800 rpm

Nissan Atlas (H41) 1991-1995

== See also ==
- List of Nissan engines
