= Nissan Shatai =

Japanese automobile contract manufacturer

Coordinates: 35.3371378°N 139.3561455°E

Nissan Shatai Co., Ltd.
- Native name: 日産車体株式会社
- Romanized name: Nissan Shatai Kabushiki-gaisha
- Company type: Public company
- Traded as: TYO: 7222
- Industry: Automotive
- Founded: 1 April 1949; 77 years ago
- Headquarters: Hiratsuka, Japan
- Area served: Worldwide
- Key people: Takashi Tomiyama (President)
- Products: Automobiles
- Revenue: ▼¥558.60 billion (FY2017) (Note: The FY (Fiscal Year) 2017 as reported by Nissan Shatai is from 1 April 2017 to 31 March 2018.)
- Operating income: ▼¥1.33 billion (FY2017)
- Net income: ▼¥−2.30 billion (FY2017)
- Total assets: ▼¥273.02 billion (FY2017)
- Total equity: ▼¥161.71 billion (FY2017)
- Parent: Nissan (45.8%)
- Subsidiaries: Nissan Shatai Kyushu Co., Ltd.; Auto Works Kyoto Co., Ltd.; Nissan Shatai Engineering Co., Ltd.; Nissan Shatai Computer Service Co., Ltd.; Pro Staff Co., Ltd.

Nissan Shatai Co., Ltd. is a Japanese automobile contract manufacturer for Nissan that is headquartered in Hiratsuka, Kanagawa. Its direct history began in 1949. As of September 2016, Nissan owns 45.8% of the company stock.

It has offices around Japan and assembly lines in Hiratsuka and Kanda, Fukuoka. This should not be confused with the nearby, older Nissan Motor Kyushu Plant in Kanda that builds the Nissan Rogue and its twin the Nissan X-Trail. Nissan Shatai focuses on light commercial vehicles, multipurpose special vehicles and specially-equipped vehicles. It currently produces vehicles such as the Nissan NV200 and Nissan Elgrand. In the past, it also produced Datsun Trucks and Nissan Safaris (sold as Nissan Patrol in various export markets).

== History ==
The company started with the establishment of Japan Aviation Industries Ltd (Nippon Koku Kogyo K.K) 1937. The Japan International Aviation Industries Ltd (Nippon Kokusai Koku Kogyo K.K) was made in 1941 by merger of Japan Aviation Industries and the International Industries Ltd (Kokusai Kogyo K.K). The Japan International Aviation Industries produced it with the development of Kokusai Ki-59 and Kokusai Ki-76 aircraft. It switched to production of auto bodies and railroad cars from 1946.

The Japan International Aviation Industries Ltd was renamed Nikkoku Industries, Ltd. in 1946 and switched business conditions. The Shin-Nikkoku Industries Ltd established in 1949. It was renamed Nissan Shatai Kohki KK (Nissan Auto Body Machinery Company) in 1962 and merged with Nikkoku Industries.

A closer partnership with Nissan Motors began in June 1951, and Nissan Patrol 4W60 production began at the Hiratsuka factory in September. Nissan purchased a majority stake that same year, after the company was unable to raise enough money in the stock exchange following the Industrial Reconstruction and Reorganization Act. In 1956, the company started to manufacture Datsun 123s at Kyoto. In 1966, after a remodeling, the Hiratsuka factory was renamed as the Shonan Plant. In 2001, the Kyoto assembly site was closed down as part of Carlos Ghosn's turnaround plan for Nissan. The Kyoto operation was reopened later that year with the name Auto Works Kyoto Co., Ltd. as a bus and commercial vehicle body assembler.

From the 1960s to the 1980s, Nissan Shatai had a conflict with Korean residents in the Utoro district of Uji. The Koreans had been forced to move there and construct an airfield for the Kyoto government during World War II. After the war, the Koreans were given no compensation or means to return home, so they remained there. The land eventually came to be owned by Nissan Shatai, who considered the Koreans squatters. The company made a number of attempts to evict the Koreans, but the Koreans rebuffed these efforts. Nissan Shatai eventually sold the land to a real estate company in a controversial deal in 1987.

In March 2011, it added the production of the Nissan Atlas F24, transferred from UD Trucks. In 2007, Nissan Shatai's Kanda, Fukuoka branch office was established, and its second Kyūshū factory was completed in 1992 and modernized in 2009. This factory operated as the Nissan Shatai Kyushu Co., Ltd. from the next year. Production of the Nissan NV200, began in December 2010. The car was chosen as a New York City taxicab in May 2011. In 2017, the Shonan Plant was one of the Nissan facilities reported for their improper safety inspection procedures. Nissan Shatai Kyushu assembles the Nissan Armada for export.

The Nissan Motor Kyushu (NMK) Plant should not be confused with the Nissan Shatai Kyushu Co., Ltd. Plant (meaning Nissan Car Body Kyushu, Co. Ltd.). Situated within NMK's Kanda industrial combine, the latter separate company and plant produces full-size SUVs, minivans, and NV350 Caravan light commercial vans for Nissan.

== Facilities ==
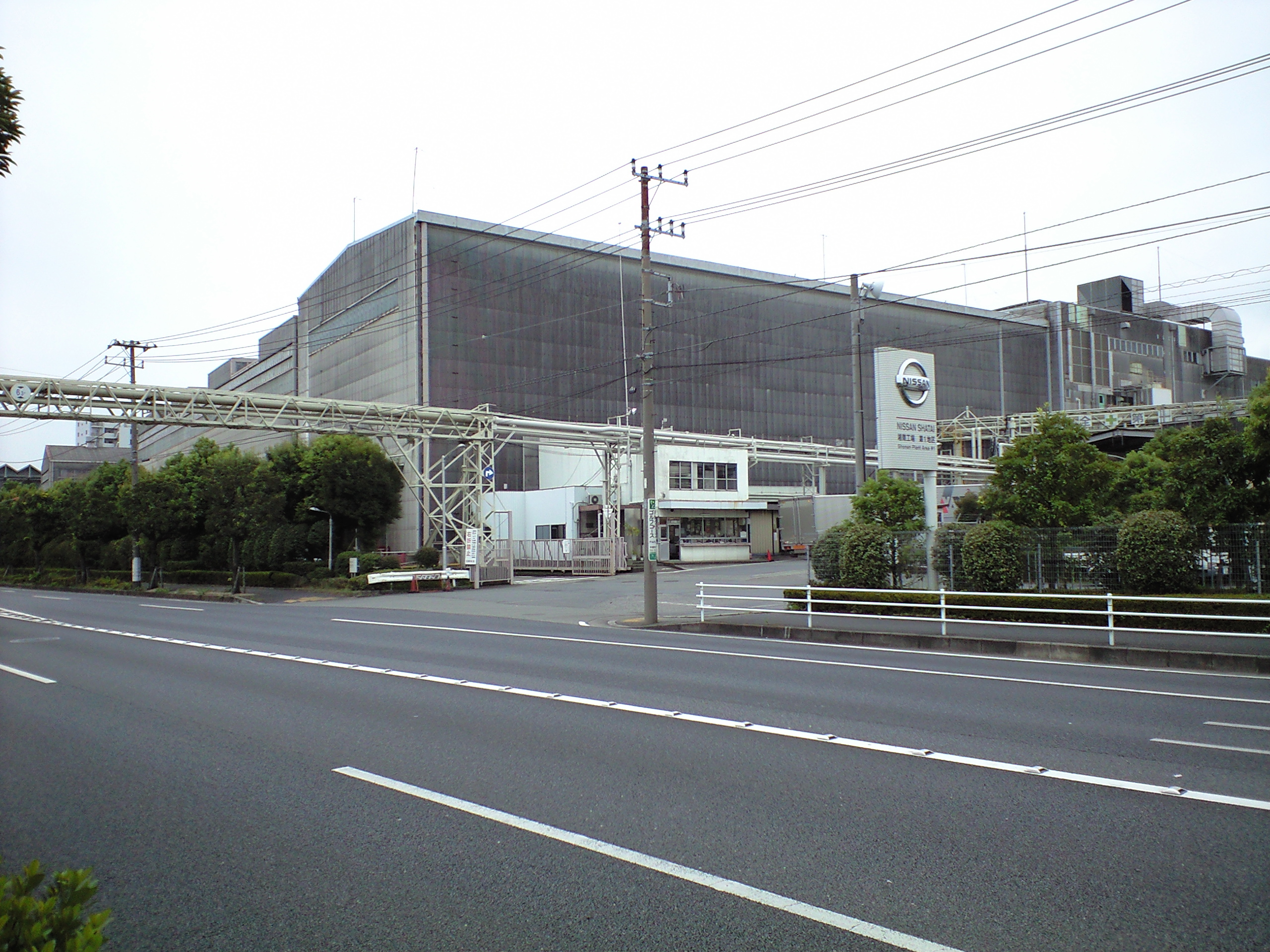
Shonan Plant Area 1

As of 2018 the Hiratsuka's Shonan Plant produces the Nissan NV200 Vanette and Taxi, the NV150 AD, the Patrol (Y61), the Patrol pickup, and the Armada. The plant is divided into Stamping, Body Assembly, Painting, Resin Molding, Car Assembly, and Logistics. Around the Hiratsuka site are also located the head offices and a research and development center (Techno Center). There also are offices in Kyoto and Hadano, Kanagawa. Nissan Shatai Kyushu has offices and a manufacturing plant in Kanda. As of 2018 it produces the Infiniti QX80, the Patrol, the Elgrand for the Japanese market, the Armada, the Quest, and the NV350 Caravan. The plant is divided into three shops: Body, Painting, and Assembly.

Nissan Shatai also owns subsidiaries Auto Works Kyoto (supplier of auto bodies, assembler of the Atlas and the Civilian), Nissan Shatai Engineering Co., Ltd., Nissan Shatai Computer Service Co., Ltd., and Pro Staff Co., Ltd. (a personnel management company).

== Historic production ==
- Nissan Patrol
- Datsun Truck
- Datsun Sports
- Nissan Cabstar
- Nissan Advan
- Nissan Pathfinder
- Nissan Civilian
- Nissan Elgrand
- Nissan Serena
- Nissan Caravan/Urvan
- Nissan Homy
- Nissan S-Cargo
- Nissan Crew
- Nissan Fairlady Z (1970–2000)
- Nissan Wingroad
