= Nissan Civilian =

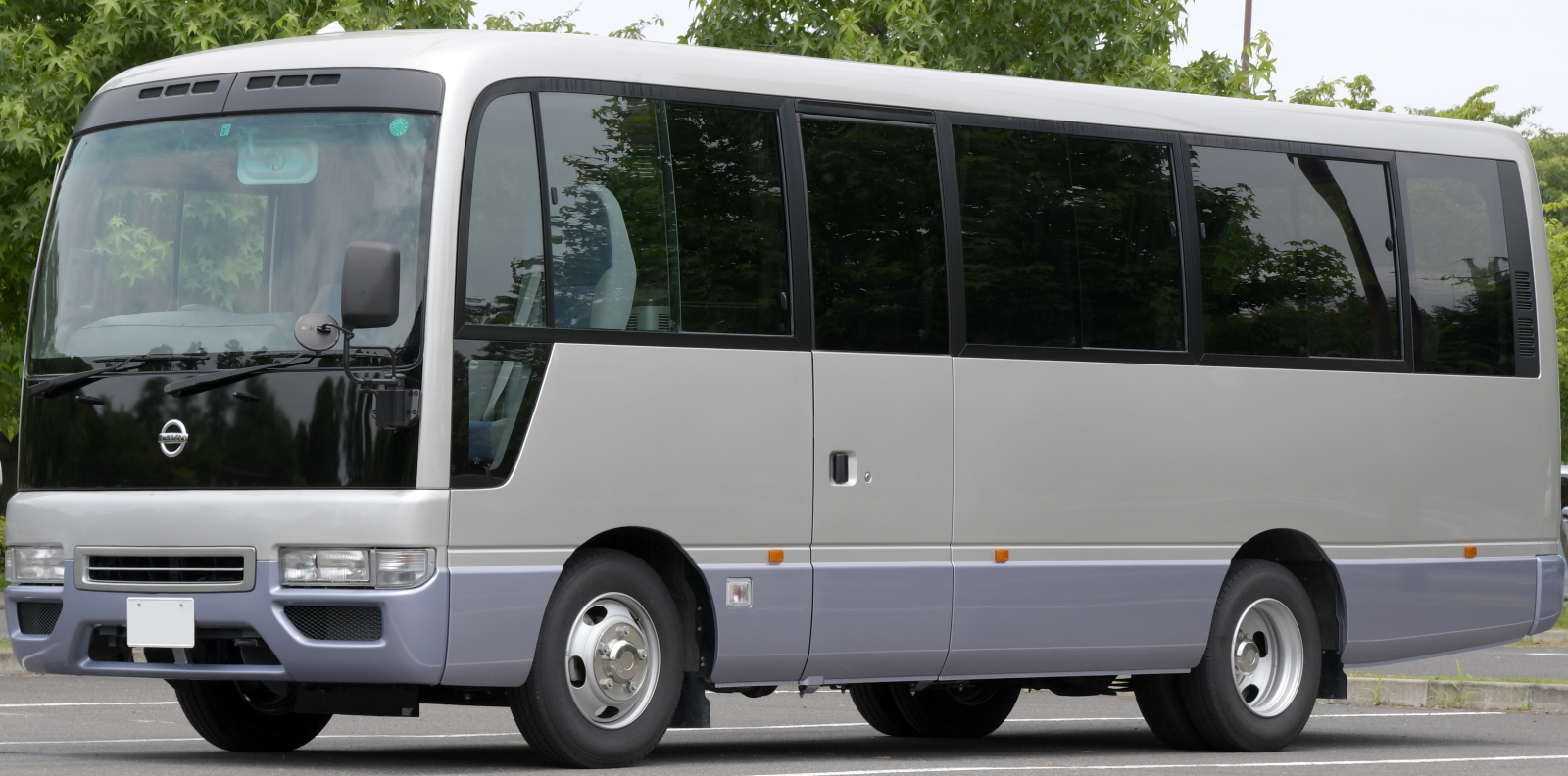
- Nissan Civilian SV (DHW41, Japan)

Overview
- Manufacturer: Nissan Shatai; Isuzu
- Also called: Datsun Civilian; Dongfeng Green Lotus; Isuzu Journey
- Production: 1971 – 2021

Body and chassis
- Class: Minibus
- Body style: Single-decker bus (SWB & LWB)
- Related: Isuzu Journey; Nissan C80

Powertrain
- Engine: Nissan; Mitsubishi
- Transmission: Nissan (manual); Getrag (automatic)

Dimensions
- Wheelbase: 3,310 mm (130.3 in) (SWB); 3,690 mm (145.3 in) (LWB)
- Length: 6,270 mm (246.9 in) (SWB); 6,990 mm (275.2 in) (LWB)
- Width: 2,065 mm (81.3 in) (TD42 engine); 2,255 mm (88.8 in) (TB45E engine)
- Height: 2,650 mm (104.3 in) (LWB)

Chronology
- Predecessor: Nissan Echo

The Nissan Civilian (kana: 日産・シビリアン, Shibirian) is a single-decker minibus built by Japanese automaker Nissan since 1971. It is primarily available as a public bus and an intercity bus. In Japan, it was exclusive to Nissan Store locations, and replaced the Nissan Echo, which was introduced in 1958. The Echo's chassis code (GC140, GC240) continued to be used on the Civilian (GC340), reflecting their shared underpinnings with the Nissan Caball (C140/240/340).

In the Japan, Asia-Pacific, Middle East, Africa and South America markets, its principal competitors are the Mitsubishi Fuso Rosa, Isuzu Journey, Mazda Parkway and Toyota Coaster. In some markets, the bus was called the Datsun Civilian and in China, the Civilian is marketed by Dongfeng as the Dongfeng Green Lotus, but has Nissan logos.

== Design ==
=== General information ===
The Nissan Civilian is sold under the Civilian and W41 or W 41 names. It is sold as the Civilian in Japan and several Central and South American countries. Its normal seating capacity is 26 passengers. Its main competitors are the Mitsubishi Fuso Rosa, Toyota Coaster, and Isuzu Journey, which significantly outnumber it in some countries.

=== Engines ===
- TB45E: 4.5L Gasoline
- TD42T: 4.2L Turbodiesel
- RD28T: 2.8L Turbodiesel
- ED33: 3.3 Diesel
- ED33T 3.3 Turbodiesel
- ED35: 3.5L D
- ZD30DDTi: 3.0L direct injection Turbodiesel
- Mitsubishi Fuso 4M50: 4.9l Diesel Turbo

== Chassis codes ==
=== Earlier models ===
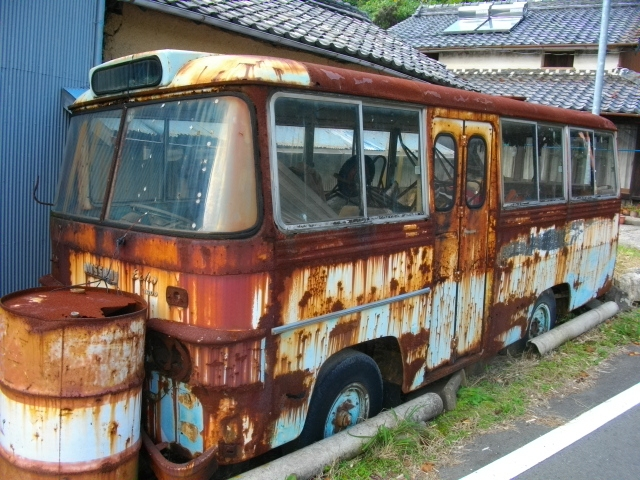
Nissan Echo (GC140), front

Originally introduced in 1958, the KC42 was a special-order vehicle built using B40 (Junior) and C40 (Caball) truck underpinnings. They were sold as the Nissan Junior Microbus and Caball Microbus respectively. In June 1960, reflecting model changes for the Junior and Caball (now B140 and C140), the Caball and Junior Microbuses were also updated and the GC140 Caball Microbus became a regularly available model. In 1961 the GC140 was renamed Caball Echo; the Junior-based buses seem to have been discontinued around this time. In 1962 the engine was changed to the 1.9-liter H engine and the name shortened to just "Echo." The chassis number was changed to GC141. In 1963 there was a light facelift, with higher mounted headlights and round rather than rectangular indicators. A long wheelbase model (GHC141) was also introduced. In January 1964 the SD22 diesel engine (GQC/GHQC141) joined the lineup. In November 1964 and October 1965 there were another two light facelifts; the second one also brought changes to the cooling system and the chassis code switched to 142.

=== GC240: Echo/Civilian, 1966–1976 ===
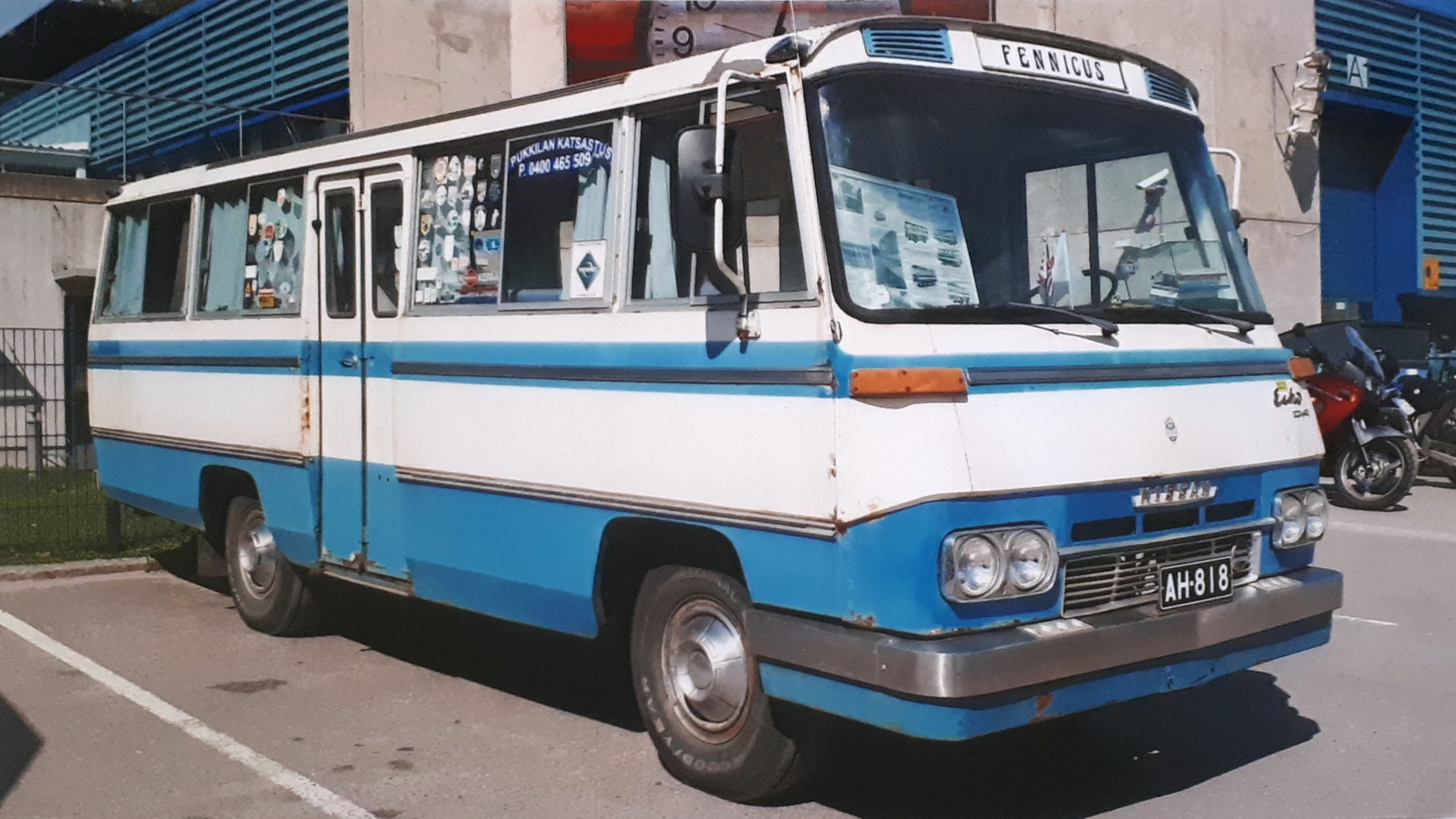
1966 – 1970 Nissan Echo

In August 1966 the all-new GC240 replaced the earlier models, with more modern design with larger glass areas. Some visible parts were shared with the Caball, such as the headlight bezels. In October 1968 there were modifications inside and out, including a padded dashboard and large combination taillights. In April 1969 a twin rear-tire model was added, and a 1970 facelift brought headlights integrated with the grille and headrests for all seats. After a series of high publicity accidents involving failing propshafts, followed by a hearing in the Diet, Nissan developed a two-piece propshaft. Nonetheless, the "Echo" name had received bad connotations and in September 1971 the C240 Echo was renamed "Civilian." Engines remained the 2-liter H20 petrol unit and the SD22 diesel. In January 1973 the 3-litre ED30 diesel engine became available, in order to better handle the added power needs of air conditioning.

=== GC340: 1976–1982 ===
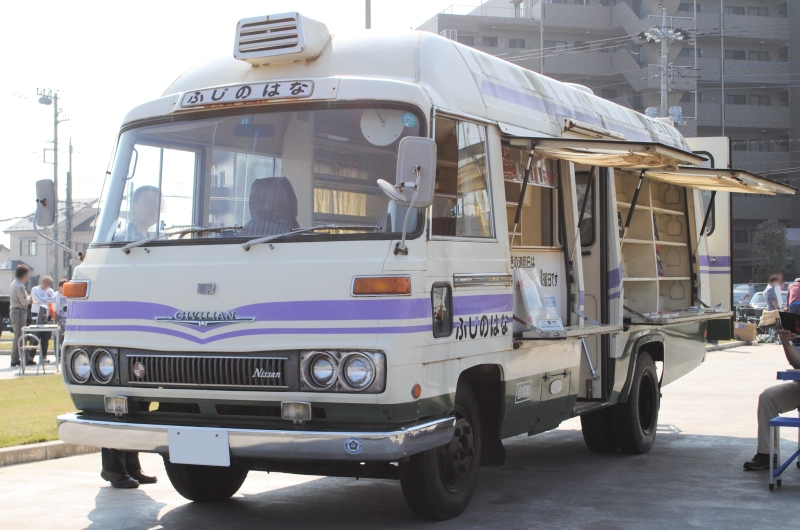
1979–1982 Nissan Civilian (GC341) used as a bookmobile

This took over from the GC240 Nissan Civilian in May 1976. The Prince Light Coach model (a competing line which had been sold through Prince retail stores) was discontinued and folded into the Civilian line. The GC340's chassis is closely related to the C340 Caball. In August 1978 the emissions controls were updated to meet new regulations; the chassis codes were accordingly changed to "341." In June 1980 a more powerful yet diesel option was introduced, the 3.3-liter ED33 with 96 PS (71 kW).

=== W40: 1982–1999 ===
Most versions of the W40-series Civilian were fitted with diesel and turbodiesel ED33 engines, but it was also available with the gasoline-powered, 2.2-litre Z22 engine. Higher end models were also available with the six-cylinder SD33 diesel. In 1984, the direct injection FD33T engine replaced some of the ED33T engines. In 1988 the gasoline-powered option was discontinued, while the six-cylinder TD42 engine supplanted the old SD33. In June 1990 the ED33 were replaced by the somewhat larger ED35 engines, in order to meet new, stricter emissions regulations.

Along with a minor facelift in August 1995, the turbocharged six-cylinder TD42T engine was added to the lineup, as was a fully automatic transmission.

- M-UW40: 1982–1988
- N-MGW40/MW40: 1982–1990
- P-FGW40/FW40/VUSW40: 1984–1988
- U-RGW40/RYW40: 1988-
- U-BGW40/BW40: 1990-
- U-RAW40: 1993-
  - Models vary from Roof Style, A/C Option, engine, and Wheelbase
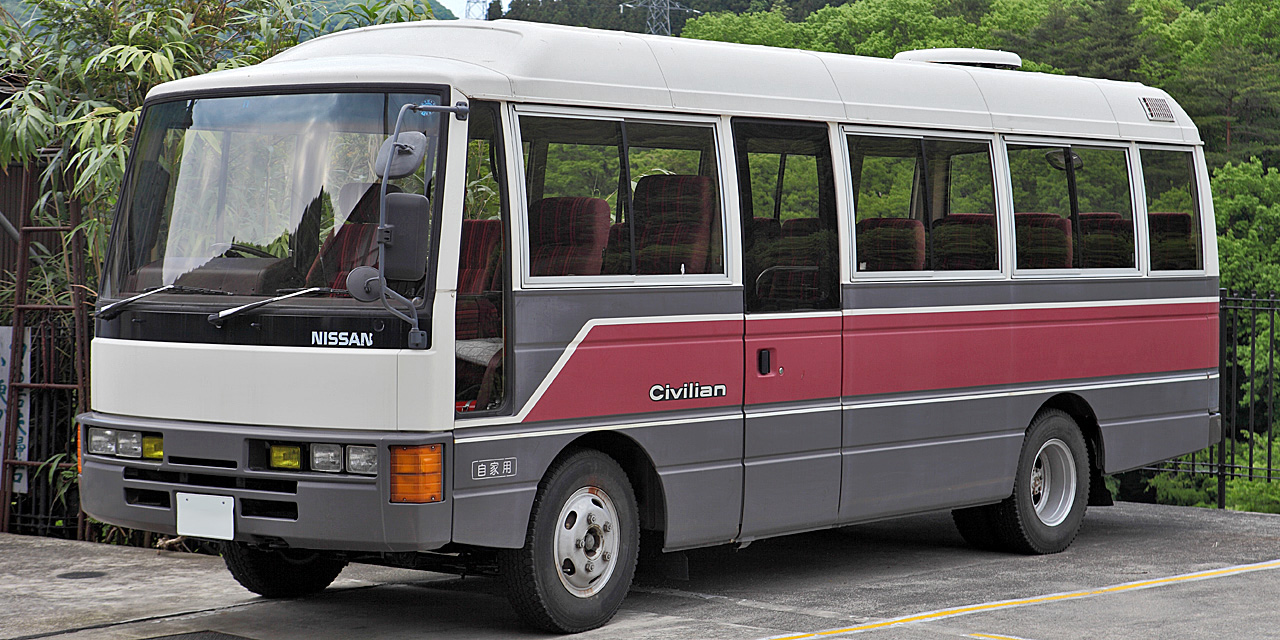
Nissan Civilian (W40; first facelift, Japan)

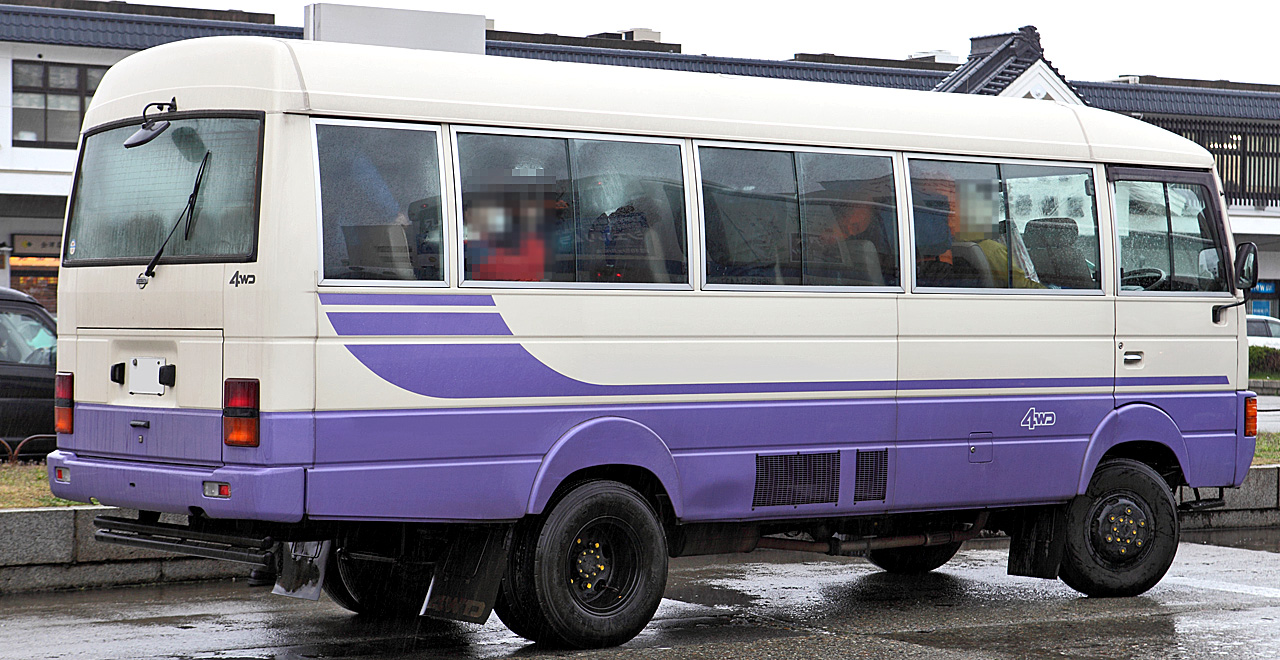
Nissan Civilian (W40, Japan)

=== W41: 1999–2021 ===
- KK-BCW41/BHW41/BJW41/BVW41: 1999–2004
- PA-ACW41/AHW41/AJW41/AVW41: 2004–2007
- PA-DCW41/DHW41/DJW41/DVW41: 2004-
  - Models vary from Suspension, Engine, and Wheelbase
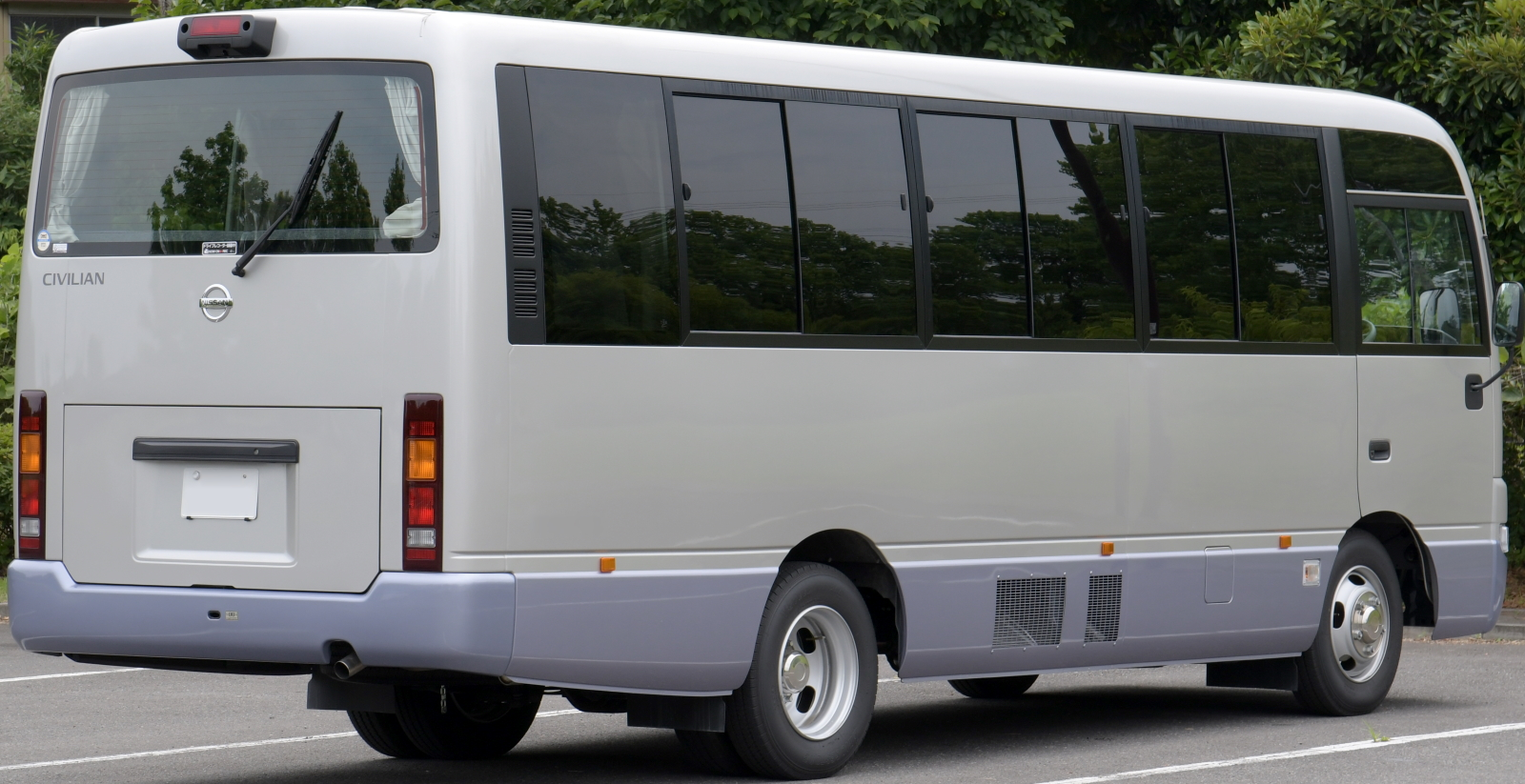
Nissan Civilian SV (DHW41; second facelift, Japan)

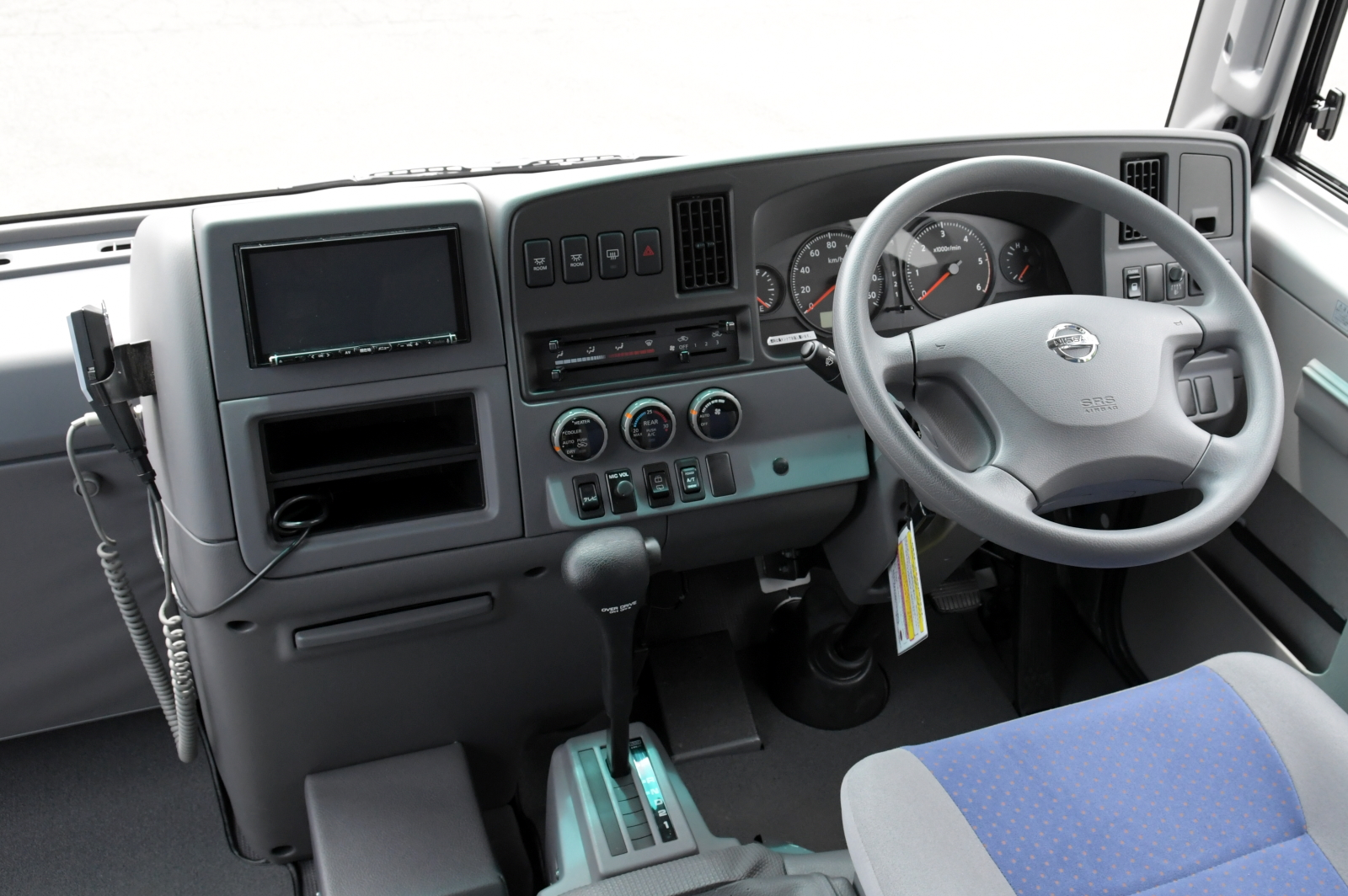
Interior

== Famous users ==
Ousted Panama dictator Manuel Noriega, in his reign, had at least one Nissan Civilian as his personal transport. It was a luxury, fully furnished version with amenities such as TV, restroom and kitchenette. This Civilian is now said to be owned by a Panamanian national who obtained it in very bad condition and restored it.

== See also ==
- List of buses
