= Nissan Clipper =

2003 truck by Nissan

The Nissan Clipper is an automobile nameplate by Nissan that has been used for two separate commercial vehicle ranges of kei trucks in Japan. Originally, this was just a rebadged version of Prince's "Clipper" light/medium duty commercial vehicle range.

In 2003, the nameplate was revived for a rebadged version of the Mitsubishi Minicab, a kei truck/microvan provided in an OEM deal. The Clipper truck/van received its facelift on 2012 and renamed the NT100 Clipper (truck) and NV100 Clipper (van).

In late 2013, the rebadged Minicab models were replaced by a rebadged version of the Suzuki Carry and Every, due to Mitsubishi Motors announced that they would stop manufacturing their own petrol-engined kei trucks and microvans for 2014.

The Minicab EV-based Clipper EV was introduced in 2024. In the same year, Suzuki-built models were renamed the Clipper Truck/Van/Rio.

== Prince Clipper ==
The history of this nameplate began with the AKTG Prince Cabover truck of May 1954, with the Clipper label first introduced on the 1.5-litre AQTI series of October 1958. The Clipper featured a distinct frontal treatment, with six oval openings for cooling. In February 1961, the AQTI was re-engined with the 1.9L GB-4 (later G-2) and renamed BQTI. In 1963 the BQTI was redesigned with quad headlights and renamed T630/T631. Engines remained the same as before, albeit with a bit more power: a 73 PS (54 kW) 1,484 cc four for the T630 and a 1,862 cc unit with 96 PS (71 kW) for the T631 Super Clipper.

In 1965, the T631 was redesigned with a new body and renamed T65. Following the merger of Nissan and Prince's operations, the truck was renamed T655 in 1967; it was now made exclusive to the new chain of Japanese Nissan dealerships called Nissan Prince Store locations. Again, the front treatment was unusual; the front featured four large chrome-ringed ovals, two of which were for cooling and two of which held the lights. The T655 also received the 2.0-litre Nissan H20 four-cylinder petrol engine. In January 1973 the new T40 series replaced the T655, but it was short-lived, lasting only just over three years. The diesel model has chassis codes beginning with YT40.

The fifth (and last) generation Clipper was the C340 of May 1976, but this was merely a rebadged Nissan Caball. The line came to an end in December 1981, when Nissan's commercial truck range was rationalized. The H40 Nissan Atlas replaced both the Clipper and the Caball.

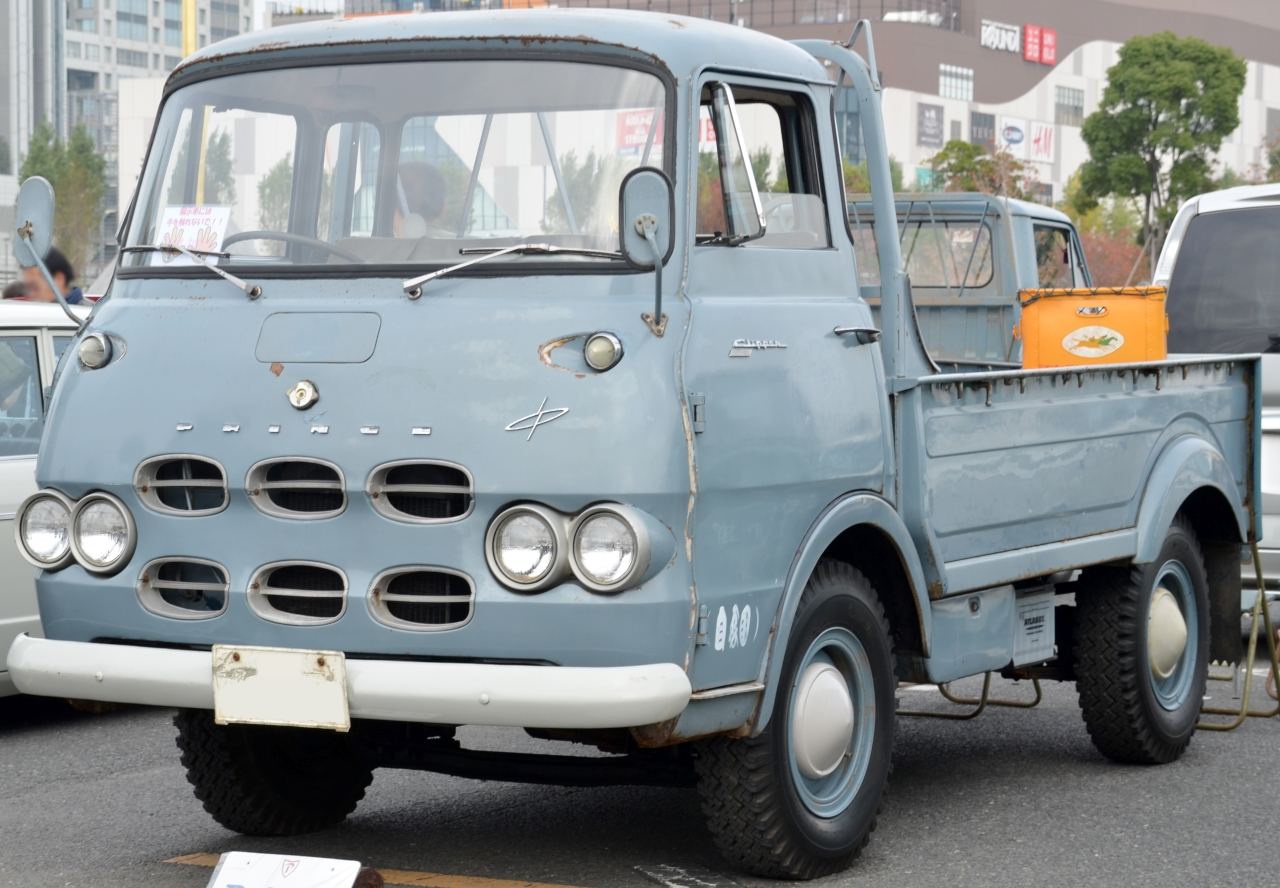
First-generation Clipper T631 (1963–1966)

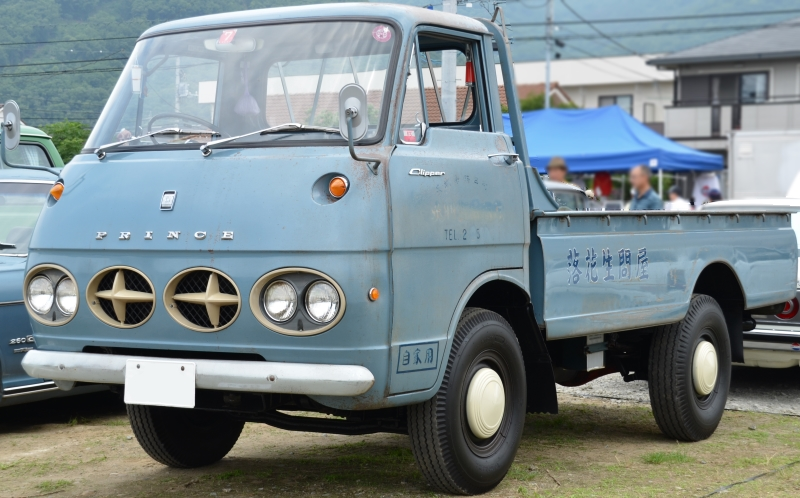
Second-generation Prince Clipper T65 (1966–1973)

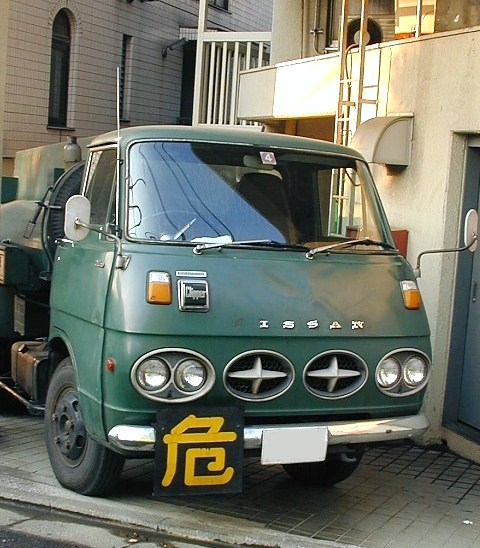
Facelifted second-generation Nissan Prince Clipper T40 (1973–1976)

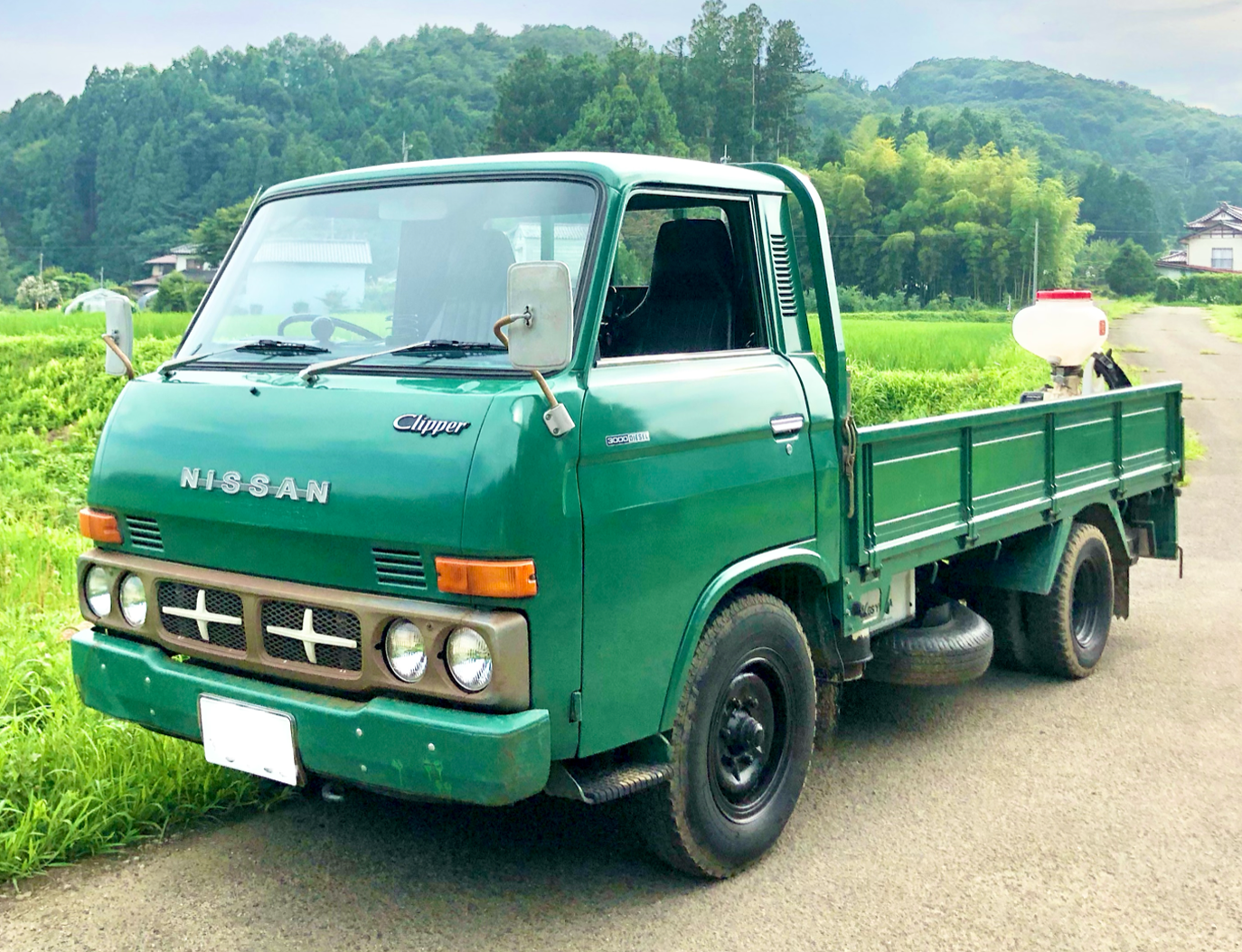
Third-generation Nissan Clipper C340 (1976–1981)

== Rebadged Mitsubishi models ==
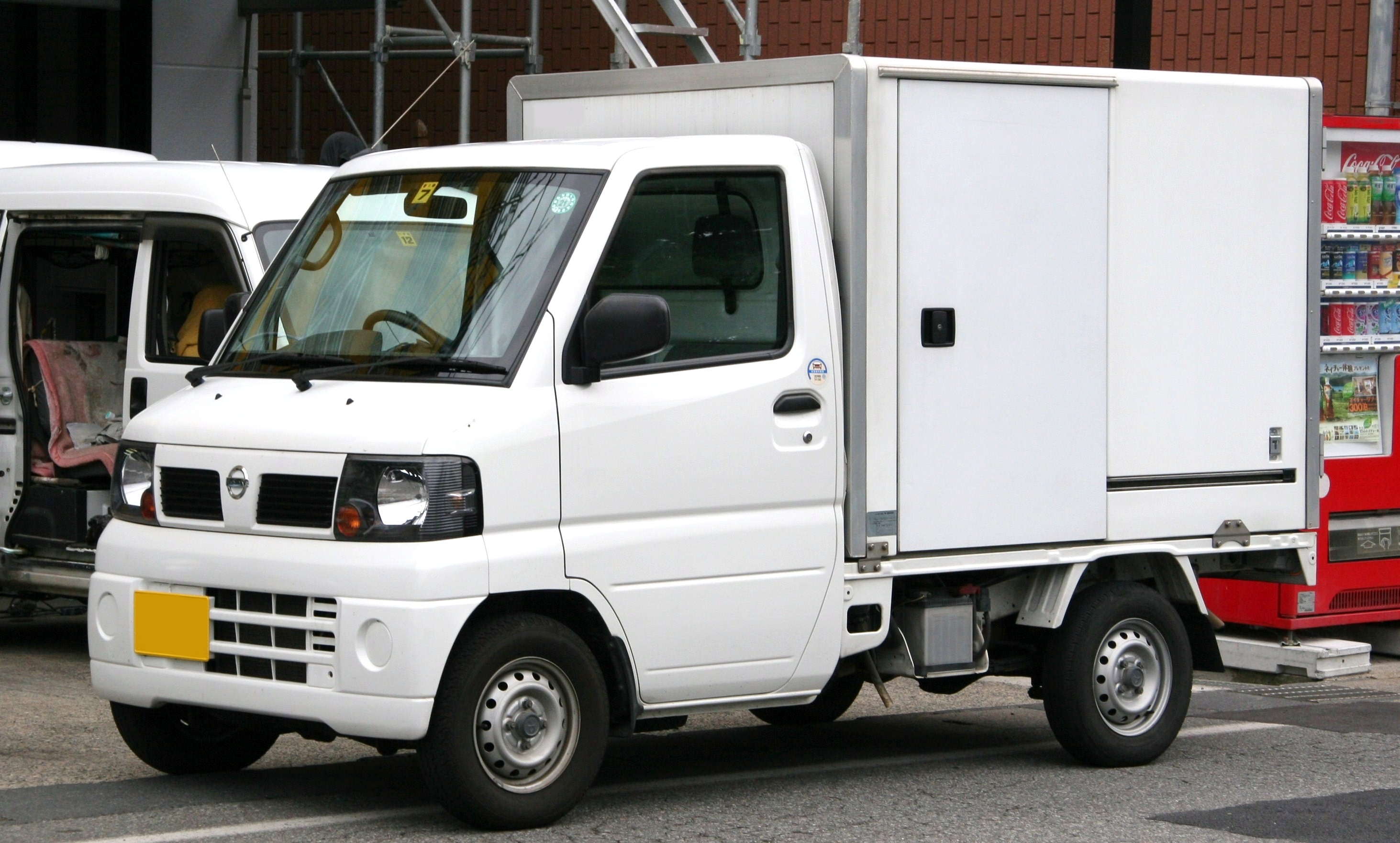
Nissan Clipper Truck U71T (2003-2012)

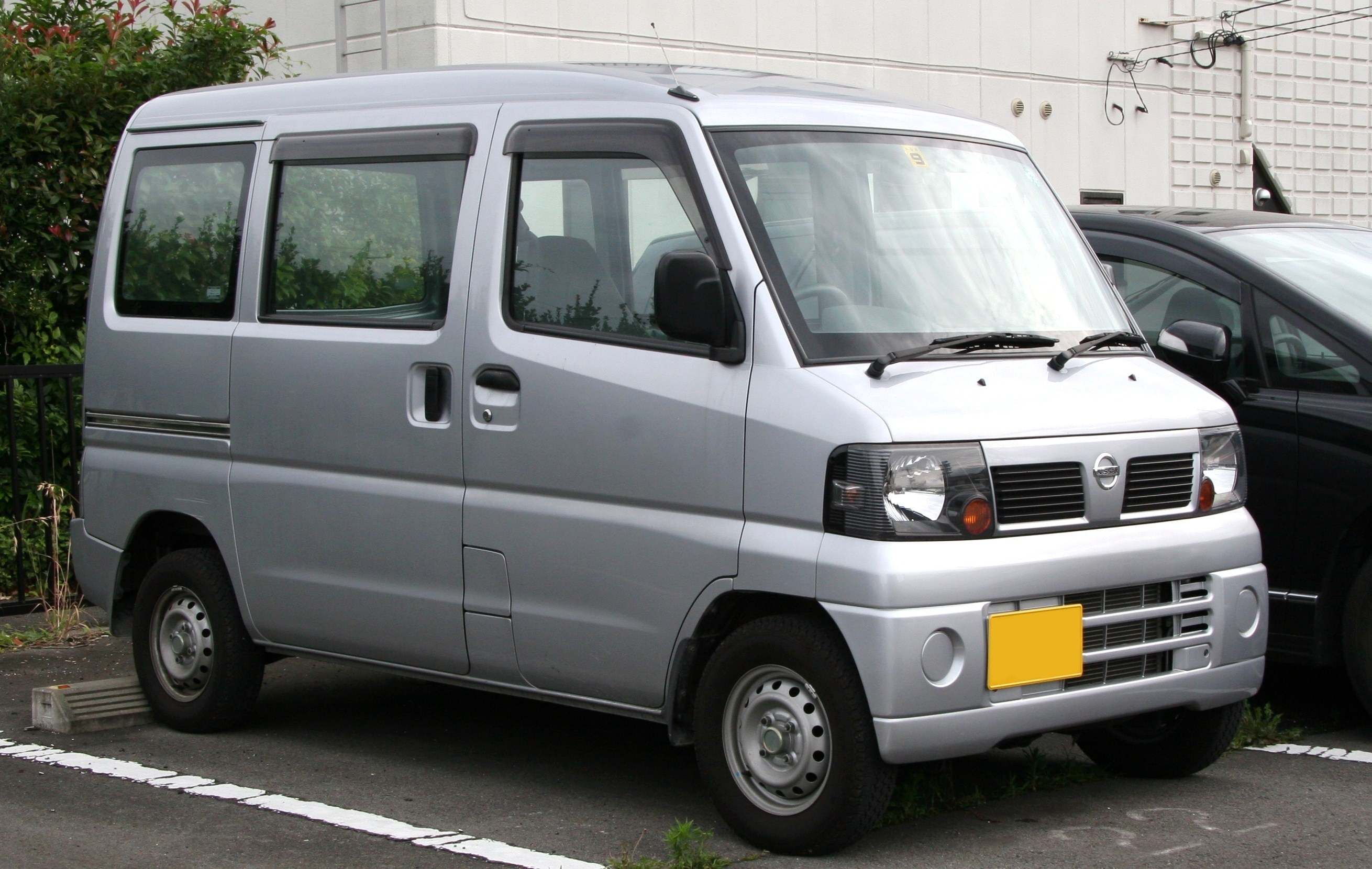
Nissan Clipper Van U71V (2003-2012)

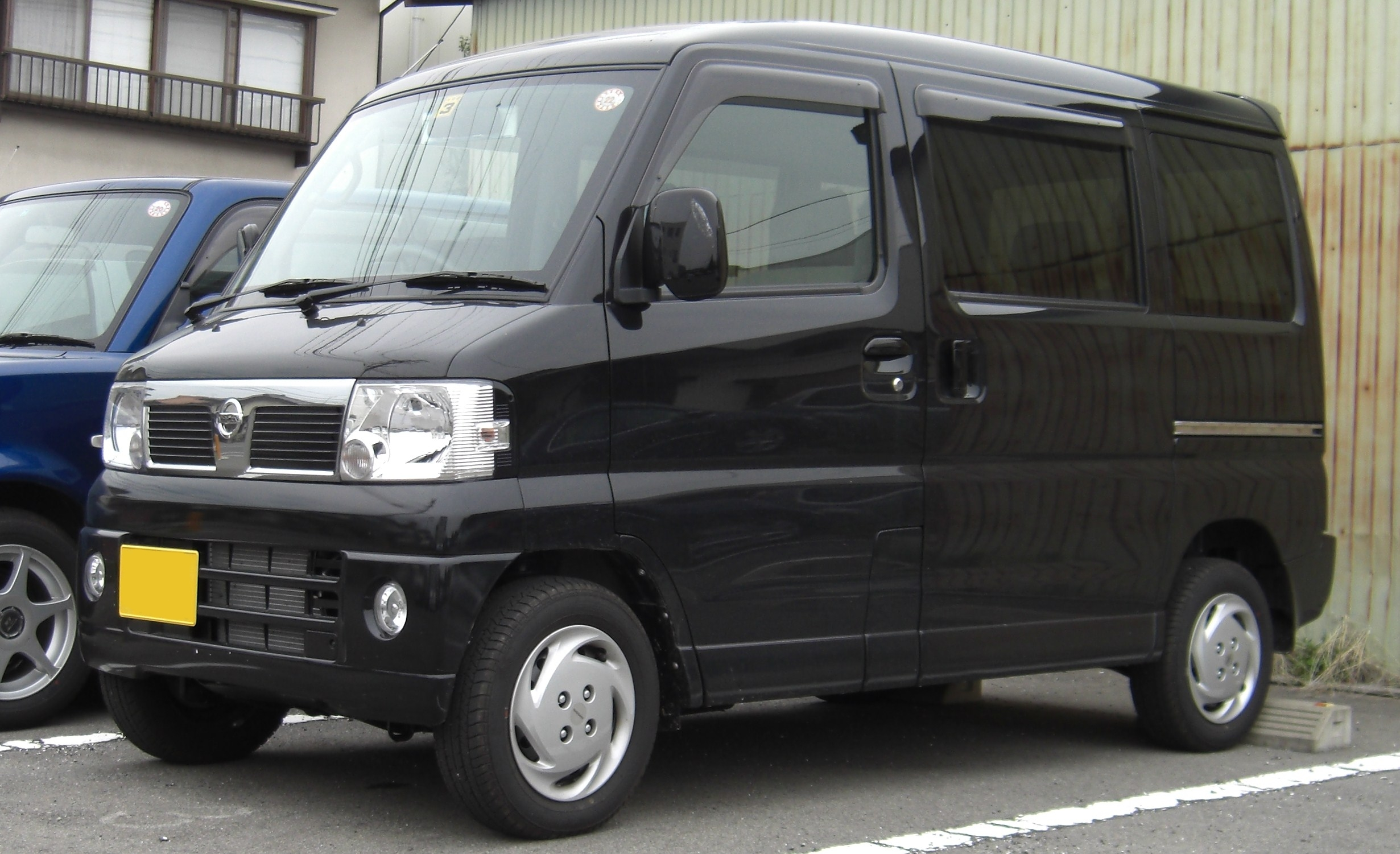
Nissan Clipper Rio U71W (2007-2012)

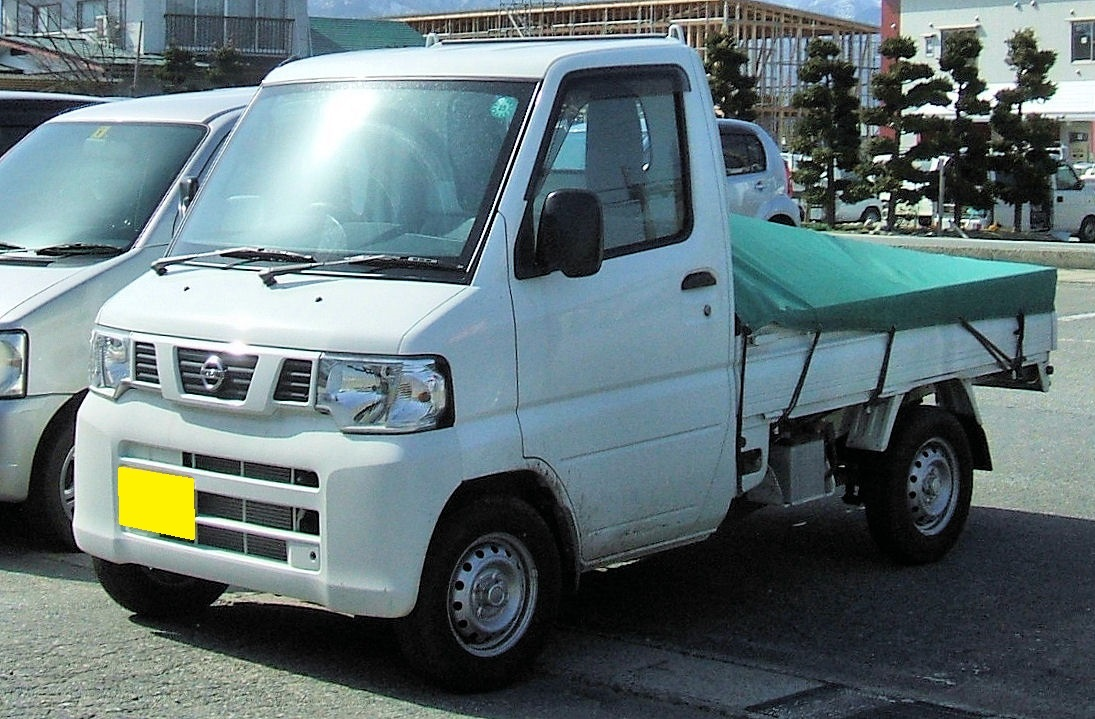
Nissan NT100 Clipper (2012-2013)

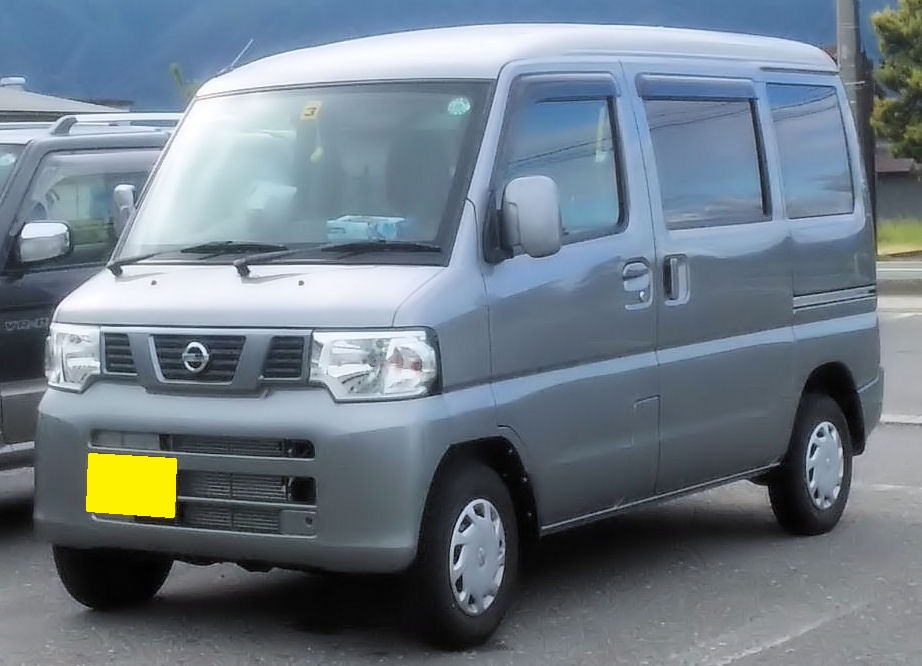
Nissan NV100 Clipper (2012-2013)

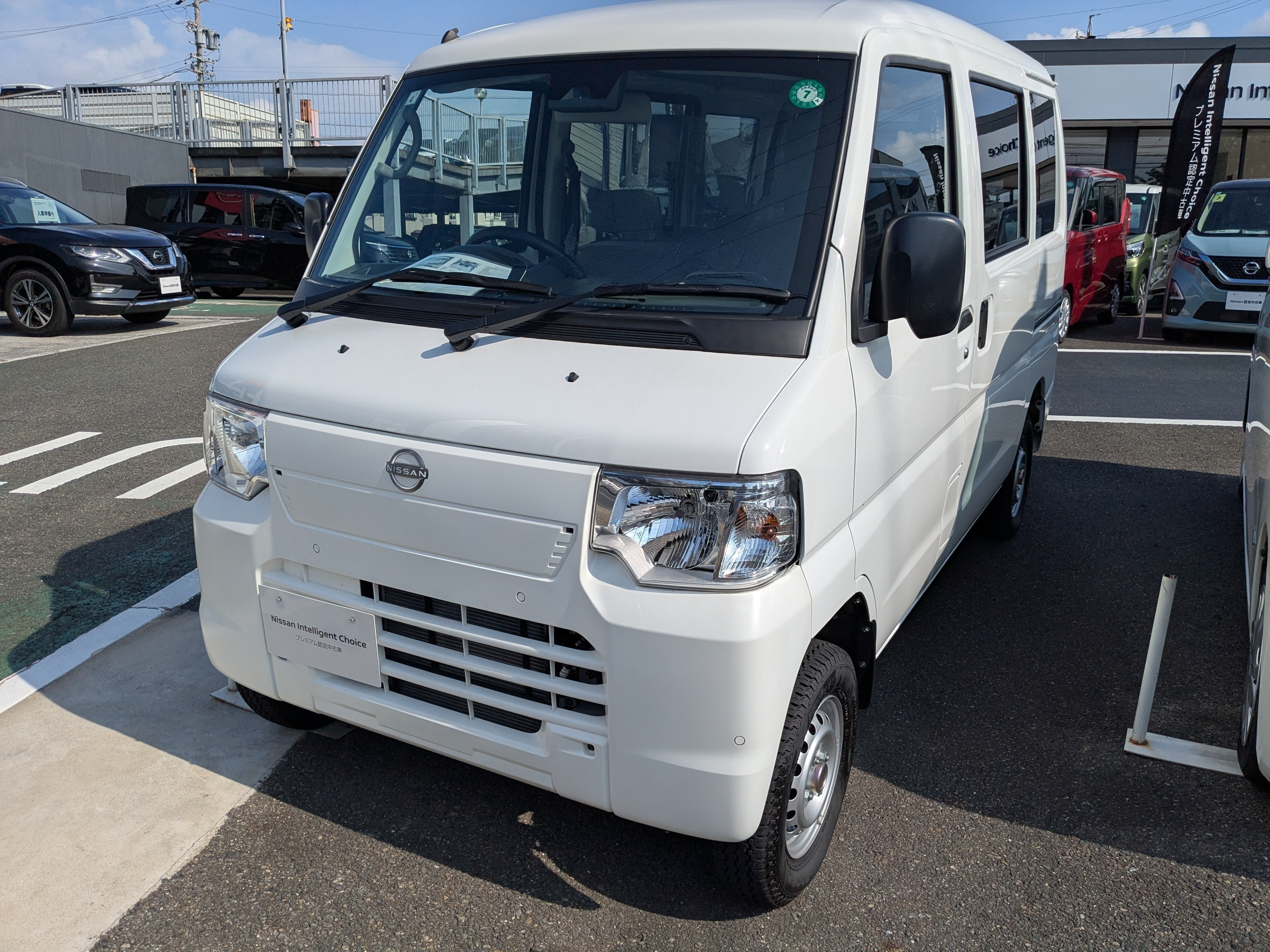
Nissan Clipper EV (2024-present)

== Rebadged Suzuki models ==
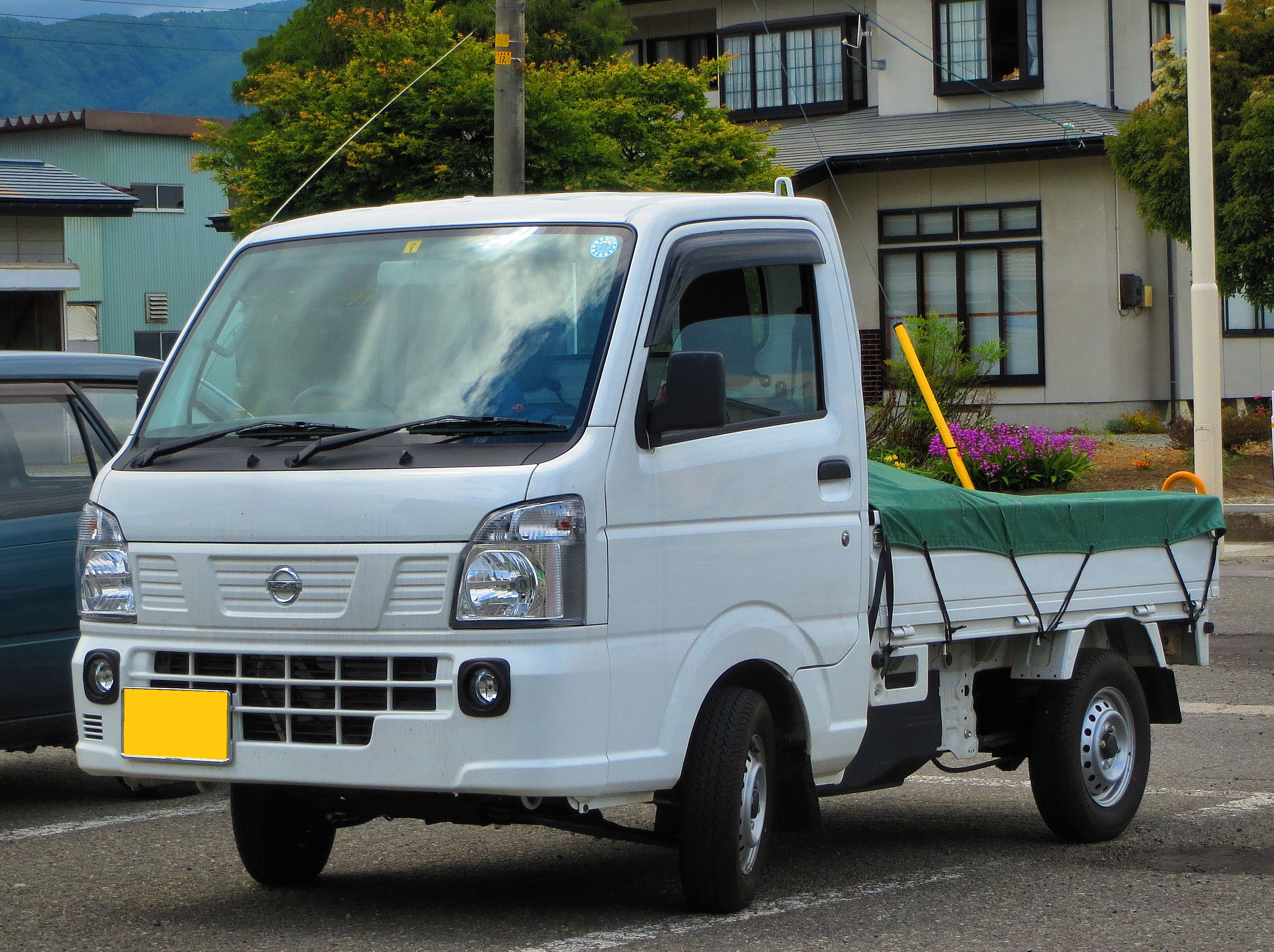
Nissan NT100 Clipper (2013-2024) / Nissan Clipper Truck (2024-present)

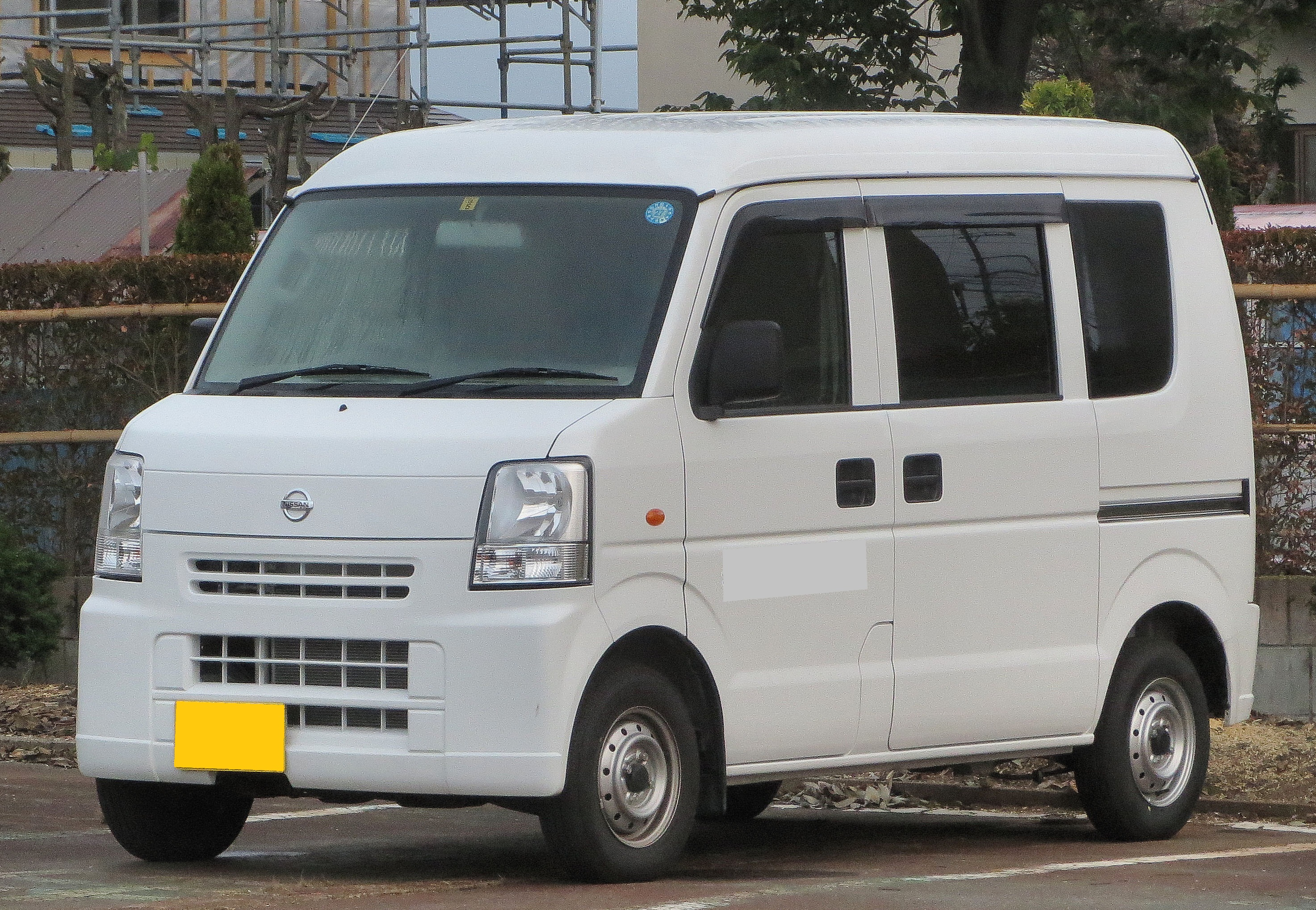
Nissan NV100 Clipper (2013-2015)

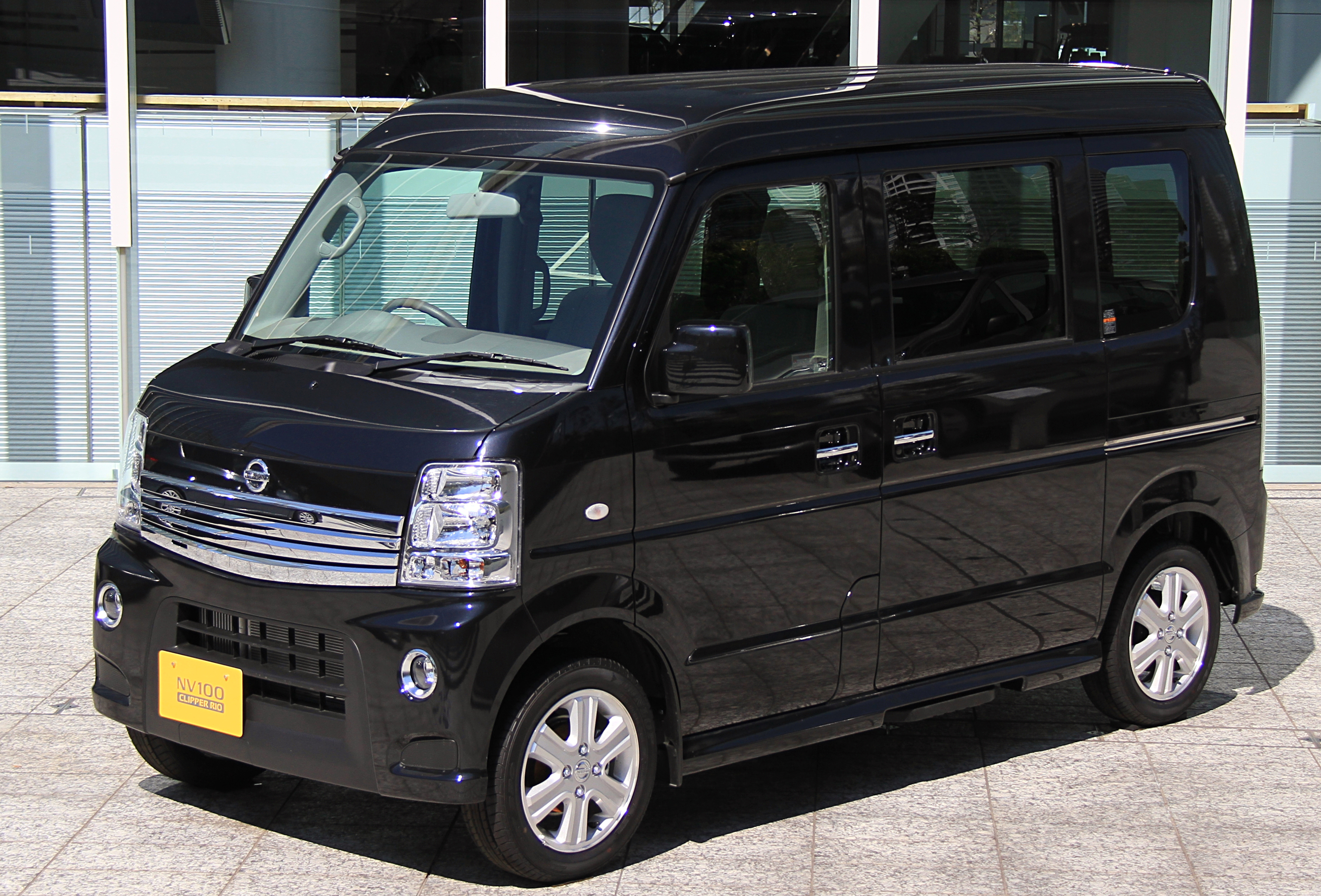
Nissan NV100 Clipper Rio (2013-2015)

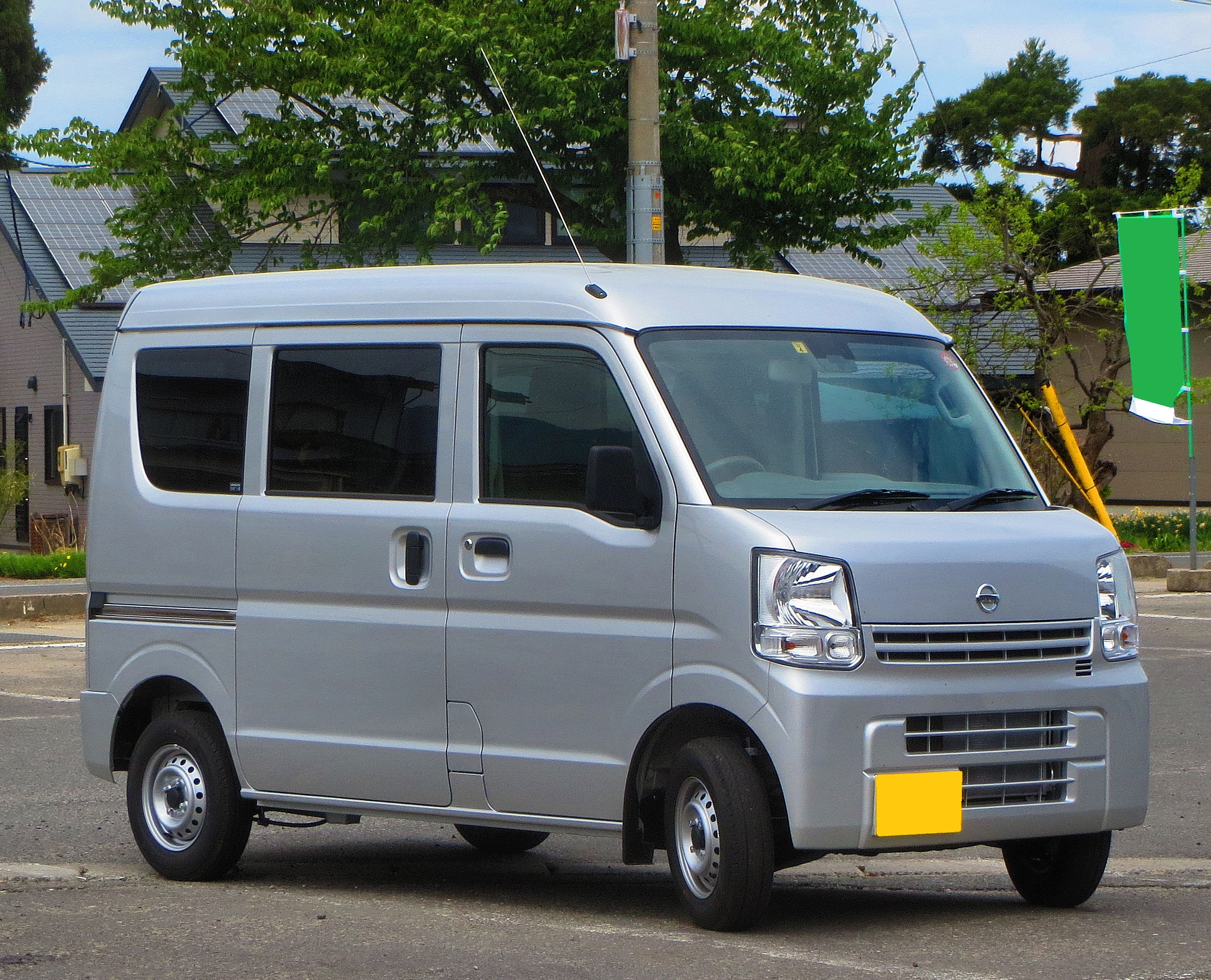
Nissan NV100 Clipper (2015-2024) / Nissan Clipper Van (2024-present)

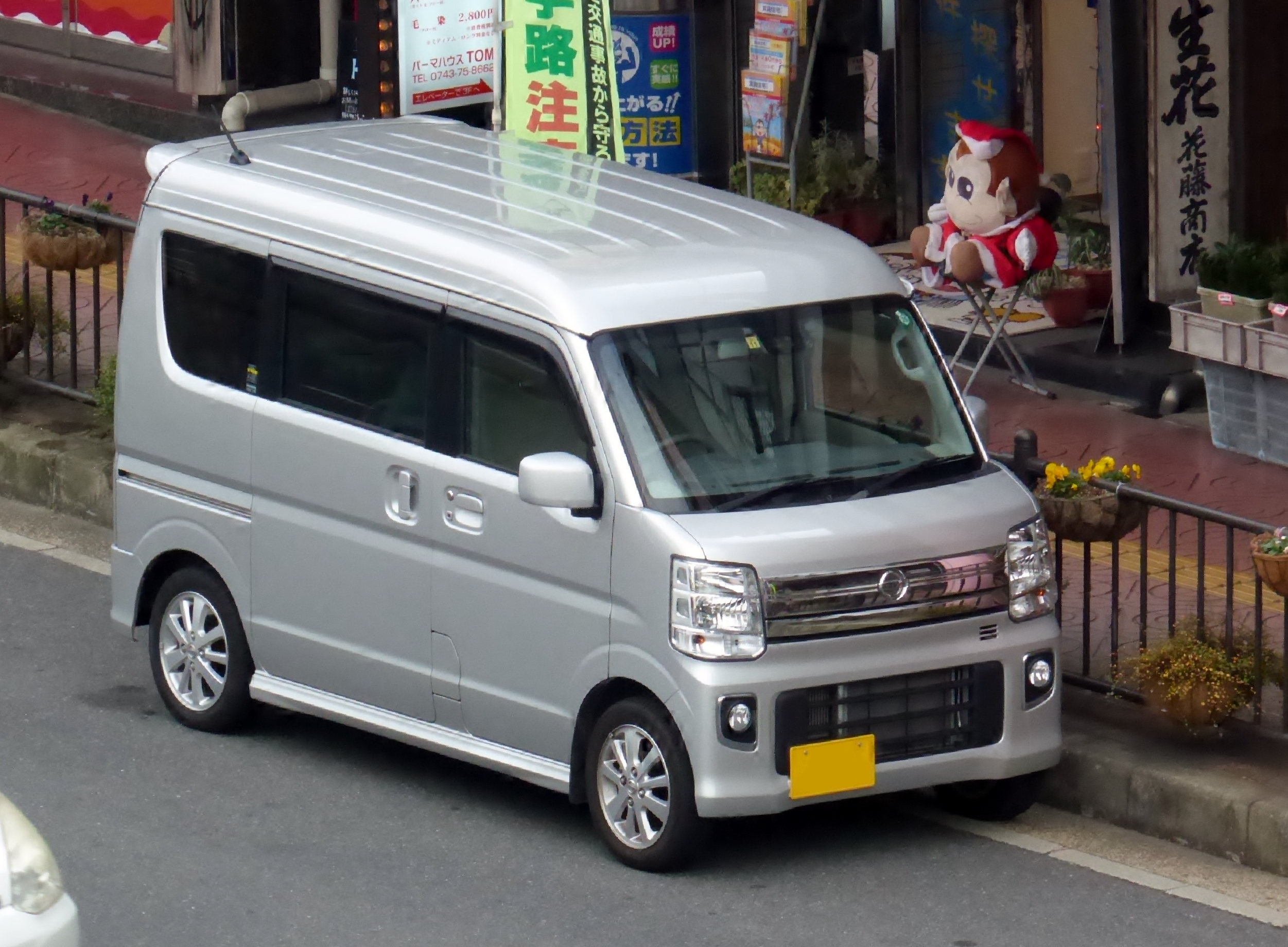
Nissan NV100 Clipper Rio (2015-2024) / Nissan Clipper Rio (2024-present)
