= Nissan C80 =

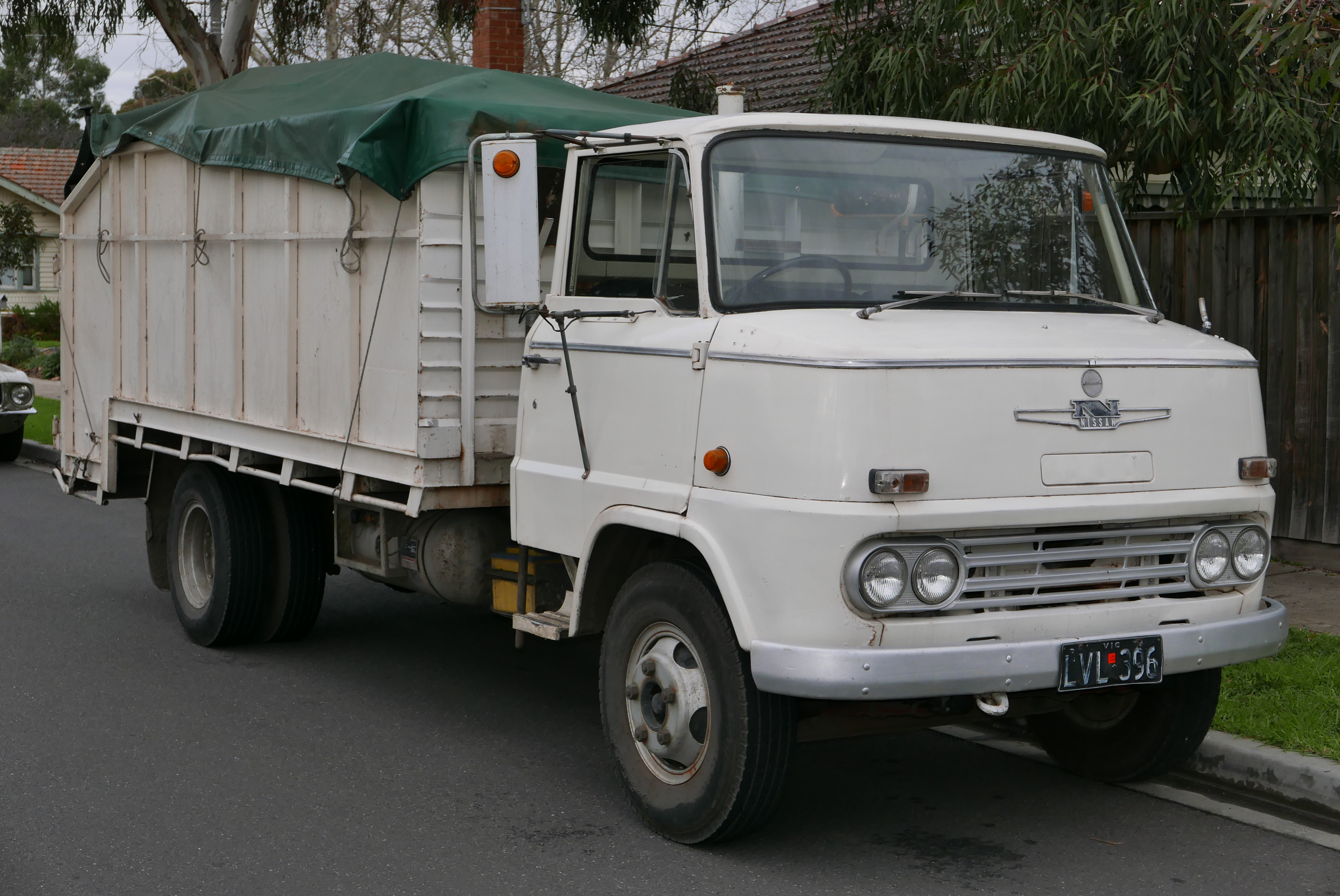

Overview
- Manufacturer: Nissan Motors
- Production: 1966–1976

Body and chassis
- Class: Medium-duty truck
- Body style: 2-door cabover truck
- Layout: FR layout
- Related: Nissan Civilian

Powertrain
- Engine: 3.0L H30 OHV I6; 3.3L SD33 I6 diesel
- Transmission: 4-speed manual

Dimensions
- Wheelbase: 3,550 mm (139.8 in)
- Length: 6,115 mm (240.7 in)
- Width: 2,115 mm (83.3 in)
- Height: 2,140 mm (84.3 in)
- Curb weight: 2,495 kg (5,501 lb)

Chronology
- Successor: Nissan Caball C340

The Nissan C80 was a medium-duty cabover truck manufactured by the Japanese automaker Nissan. The 3.5 ton C80 was introduced in 1966 to fill the gap between the 2 ton Nissan Caball and the 5 ton Nissan 680. Like the Caball, the C80 was a cab forward truck, shared with the Nissan Civilian. Two engines were available: the 3.0L H30 inline-6 that produced 120 horsepower, or the SD33 inline-6 diesel that produced 98 horsepower. The transmission was a column-shift 4-speed manual, but a 5-speed was offered as an option. There were no significant changes made to the C80 while in production when it was discontinued in 1976. It was exclusive to Japanese Nissan dealerships called Nissan Store.
