= List of Nissan engines =

This is a list of piston engines developed by Nissan Motors.

== Engine naming convention ==
Nissan uses a straightforward method of naming their automobile engines.

The first few letters identify the engine family. The following digits are the displacement in deciliters. Finally, the trailing letters encode the main engine features, and are ordered based on the type of feature. Below is a list of encoded letters, and the engine features they represent. Make note, the first few letters in the engine name that identify the engine family have nothing to do with these encoded letters for the engine features, and should not be confused as such.

Letter	Feature	Feature type
D	DOHC	Camshaft
V	Variable Valve Lift	Camshaft
S	Carburetor	Fuel delivery
T	Twin carburetors (e.g. L16T and L18T)	Fuel delivery
i	Throttle Body Fuel Injection	Fuel delivery
E	Multi Port Fuel Injection	Fuel delivery
D	Direct Cylinder Fuel Injection	Fuel delivery
N	Natural gas fueled	Fuel delivery
P	LPG fueled	Fuel delivery
R	Supercharged	Power adder
T	Turbocharged	Power adder
Ti	Turbocharged and intercooled	Power adder
TT	Twin-Turbocharged	Power adder
HR	High Response and High Revolution	Special
K	Improvement (from Kaizen)	Special
e	Engines specifically built as a power generator for electric motors	Special

The encoded letters that represent engine features follow a specific order and not all features are necessarily listed all of the time. The basic, common features follow this general order:

[Engine family] [two-digit engine displacement in deciliters] [1] [2] [3] [4] [5]

1 = Camshaft
2 = Fuel delivery
3 = Power adder
4 = 2nd power adder
5 = Special

A good example to start with is the Nissan VG30DETT engine. It belongs to the VG engine family, displaces 30 deciliters (3.0 liters), and the feature letters describe an engine with dual overhead camshafts, electronic port fuel injection and two turbochargers.

The next example is the Nissan VQ35DE engine. It belongs to the VQ engine family and displaces 35 deciliters (3.5 liters). The feature letters describe an engine with dual overhead camshafts and electronic port fuel injection, but leaves off any power adder descriptors because it is a naturally aspirated engine. The (single) turbocharged version of the VQ displaces 30 deciliters (3.0 liters) and is logically called the VQ30DET.

Not all features are necessarily described in the name. For example, the SR20VE engine has dual overhead camshafts, but the variable valve lift design of the camshafts takes precedence in the naming scheme even though the "V" feature designation doesn't necessarily describe a DOHC arrangement. Many standard DOHC Nissan engines featured Variable Valve Timing, such as the VG30DETT, and as such do not use the "V" designation. The "V" designation is applied only if the engine has variable valve lift.

A good example of an engine where not all of the feature designation spots are used is the L28ET engine. The two features listed are electronic port fuel injection designated with the "E" and the presence of a turbocharger designed with the letter "T". The engine has a single overhead camshaft so there is no "D" listed in the name; the camshaft type designation place being left out completely. Nissan does not have a letter designation for the SOHC configuration so the camshaft configuration type is assumed as SOHC if no letter is present.

Another useful example (because it repeats letters which have different meanings based on their order) is the MR16DDT engine, which has feature designations that describe an engine with dual overhead camshafts, direct cylinder fuel injection and a single turbocharger.

== Gasoline engines ==
=== Straight-3 ===
- 2010–present Nissan HR engine — 1.0/1.2/1.4 L — HR10DDT, HR10DE, HR12DE, HR12DDR, HR14DDe (See Straight-4 below for other HR engines)
- 2014–present Nissan BR engine — 0.6/0.8/1.0 L — BR06DE, BR06DET, BR08DE, BR10DE
- 2021–present Nissan KR engine — 1.5 L — KH5T, KR15DDT
- 2025–present Nissan ZR engine — 1.5 L — ZR15DDTe

=== Straight-4 ===
Nissan's Straight-4 engines include:

- 1931–1964 Datsun sidevalve engine — 495/722/747/860 cc — Type 7, Type 10, D-10, B-1
- 1952–1966 Nissan D engine — 1.0/1.1/1.2 L — D/D10, D11, D12
- 1954–2003 Nissan H engine — 1.9/2.0 L — H, H20, H20-II, H25 (See Straight-6 below for other H engines.)
- 1955–1975 Prince G engine — 1.5/1.6/1.8/1.9/2.0 L — GA-4/G-1, GB-30/G-2, G-15, G-18
- 1957–1960 Nissan C engine — 1.0 L
- 1958–1964, 1982–1988 Nissan E engine — 1.0/1.2/1.3/1.5/1.6 L — E, E-1, E10, E13, E15E, E15ET, E16, E16E
- 1961–1970 Nissan G engine — 1.5 L — G
- 1965–1970 Nissan R engine — 1.6 L — R16
- 1965–1982 Nissan J engine — 1.3/1.5/2.0 L — J13, J15, J16
- 1966–2010 Nissan A engine — 1.0/1.2/1.3/1.4/1.5 L — A10, A12, A12T, A12A, A13, A14, A15
- 1967.5–1970 Datsun U engine — 2.0 L — U20
- 1968–1988 Nissan L engine — 1.3/1.4/1.6/1.8/2.0 L — L13, L14, L16, L18, L20B, LD20, LD20-II (diesel) (See Straight-6 below for other L engines)
- 1979–1989 Nissan Z engine — 1.6/1.8/2.0/2.2/2.4 L — Z16, Z18, Z18ET, Z20S, Z20E, Z22E, Z24
- 1982–1991 Nissan CA engine — 1.6/1.8/2.0 L — CA16, CA18i, CA18DE, CA18DET, CA18ET, CA20, CD17, CD20 (diesel)
- 1983–1987 Nissan FJ engine — 2.0/2.4 L — FJ20E, FJ20ET, FJ24
- 1983–1992 Nissan MA engine — 0.9/1.0/1.2 L — MA09ERT, MA10S, MA10E, MA10ET, MA12S
- 1987–2013 Nissan GA engine — 1.3/1.4/1.5/1.6 L — GA14DE, GA16E, GA16DE, GA16DNE, GA16DS
- 1987–2007 Nissan SR engine — 1.6/1.8/2.0 L — SR16DE, SR16Di, SR16D, SR16VE, SR16VE N1, SR18DE, SR18DET, SR18Di, SR20DE, SR20DE GT Spec, SR20DET, SR20Di, SR20VE, SR20VET
- 1988–2004 Nissan KA engine — 2.0/2.4 L — KA20DE, KA24E, KA24DE
- 1989–2015 Nissan NA engine — 1.6/2.0 L — NA16, NA20 - replacement of Z series and mostly used in commercial vehicles. Designed based on Z series.
- 1992–2002 Nissan CG engine — 1.0/1.3/1.4 L — CG10DE, CG13DE, CGA3DE
- 1999–2009 Nissan QG engine — 1.3/1.5/1.6/1.8 L — QG13DE, QG15DE, QG16DE, QG18DE, QG18DD, QG18DEN
- 1999–present Nissan QR engine — 2.0/2.5 L — QR20DE, QR20DD, QR25DE, QR25DD, QR25DER
- 2002–2013 Nissan CR engine — 1.0/1.2/1.4 L — CR10DE, CR12DE, CR14DE
- 2004–present Nissan MR engine — 1.6/1.8/2.0 L — MR16DDT, MR18DE, MRA8DE, MR20DE, MR20DD
- 2010–present Nissan HR engine — 1.2/1.5/1.6 L — HR12DDT, HR15DE, HR16DE (See Straight-3 above for other HR engines)
- 2017–present Nissan KR engine — 2.0 L — KR20DDET
- 2019–present Nissan PR engine — 2.5 L — PR25DD
- 2026–present Nissan NR engine — 1.5 L — NR15

=== Straight-6 ===
Nissan's Straight-6 engines include:

- 1950–1955 Nissan NAK engine — 3.7 L
- 1955–1956 Nissan NB engine — 3.7 L
- 1955–1959 Nissan NC engine — 4.0 L
- 1959–2003 Nissan P engine — 4.0 L — P40
- 1963–1969 Prince G engine — 2.0/2.5 L — G-7/G7B-R, GR-8, G-11 (See Straight-4 above for other G engines)
- 1965–1977 Nissan H engine — 3.0 L — H30 (See Straight-4 above for other H engines)
- 1968–1973 Nissan S20 engine — 2.0 L
- 1968–1986 Nissan L engine — 2.0/2.3/2.4/2.6/2.8 L — L20A, L20E, L20ET, L20P, L23, L24, L24E, L26, L26E, L28, L28E, L28ET,, LD28 (diesel) (See Straight-4 above for other L engines)
- 1985–2004, 2019–present Nissan RB engine — 2.0/2.4/2.5/2.6/2.8/3.0 L — RB20E, RB20ET, RB20DE, RB20DET, RB20DET-R, RB24DET, RB25DE, RB25DET, RB26DE, RB26DETT, RB28DETT, RB30S, RB30E, RB30ET, RB30DE, RD28 (diesel)
- 1987–2023 Nissan TB engine — 4.2/4.5/4.8 L — TB42E, TB42S, TB45E, TB48DE, TD42 (diesel)

=== V6 ===
Nissan's V6 engines include:

- 1984–2004 Nissan VG engine — 2.0/3.0/3.3 L — VG20E, VG20P, VG20ET, VG20DE, VG20DET, VG30S, VG30i, VG30E, VG30ET, VG30DE, VG30DET, VG30DETT, VG33E, VG33ER
- 1992–1994 Nissan VE engine — 3.0 L — VE30DE
- 1995–present Nissan VQ engine — 2.0/2.3/2.5/3.0/3.5/3.7/3.8/4.0 L — VQ20DE, VQ23DE, VQ25DD, VQ25DE, VQ25DET, VQ25HR, VQ25VHR, VQ30DD, VQ30DE, VQ30DE-K, VQ30DET, VQ35DE, VQ35DD, VQ35HR, VQ37VHR, VQ38HR, VQ38DD, VQ40DE
- 2008–present Nissan VR engine — 3.0/3.5/3.8 L — VR30DDTT, VR35DDTT, VR38DETT
- 2015–2018 Nissan VRX30A engine — 3.0 L (Non-Production)

=== V8 ===
Nissan's V8 engines include:

- 1965–1989 Nissan Y engine — 4.0/4.4 L — Y40, Y44
- 1966–1967 Nissan W64 engine —6.4 L (Limited Production)
- 1987 Nissan VEJ30 engine —3.0 L (Non-Production)
- 1988–2002 Nissan VRH engine — 3.0/3.4/3.5/5.0 L (Non-Production)
- 1989–2001 Nissan VH engine — 4.1/4.5 L — VH41DE, VH45DE
- 2001–2023 Nissan VK engine — 4.5/5.0/5.6 L — VK45DE, VK45DD, VK50VE, VK56DE, VK56VD

=== V12 ===
Nissan's V12 engines include:

- 1969–1970 GRX-III (Non-Production)— 6.0 L—Nissan R382, Nissan R383
- 1991–1992 VRT35 (Non-Production)— 3.5 L

== Diesel engines ==
Diesel Engines in summary (model, displacement)

- 1955–1983 Nissan UD engine – 3.7-14.8 L
- 1964–1987 Nissan SD engine – 2.0/2.2/2.3/2.5/3.3 L
- 1966–1986 Nissan LD engine – 2.0/2.8 L
- Nissan BD engine – 2.5/3.0 L
- 1982–2001 Nissan CD engine – 1.7/2.0 L
- 1984–1995 Nissan ED/FD engine – 3.0/3.3/3.5/4.2/4.6 L
- 1985–2009 Nissan RD engine – 2.8 L
- 1986–2007 Nissan TD engine – 2.3/2.5/2.7/4.2 L
- 1990–2000 Nissan QD engine – 3.2 L
- 1998–present Nissan YD engine – 2.2/2.5 L
- 1999–present Nissan ZD engine – 3.0 L
- 2006–present Nissan M9R engine - 2.0 L
- 2009–2017 Nissan V9X engine – 3.0 L
- 2010–present Nissan YS engine – 2.3 L

== Wankel engine ==
Nissan showed a prototype Wankel rotary engine at the Tokyo Motor Show in 1972, but it never reached production.

== Electric motors ==
Nissans lineup of electric motors include:

- 2010-2012 EM61
- 2013–present EM57
- 2020–present EM47

== Glossary ==
- Nissan NAPS Nissan Anti Pollution System, predecessor to Nissan ECCS
- Nissan PLASMA (Powerful ＆ Economic, Lightweight, Accurate, Silent, Mighty, Advanced) is an acronym for the engine series designed to counter Toyota's Lightweight Advanced Super Response Engine (LASRE).
- Nissan ECC is the Exhaust Gas Recirculator or EGR.
- Nissan ECCS ("eltukusu") Electronic Concentrated Control System (ECCS), or Electronic Gas Injector (EGI), is an electronic fuel injection system designed to improve fuel economy and to reduce exhaust emission.
- N-VCT or Nissan Variable Cam Timing is an automobile variable valve timing technology. (NVCS)
- NEO, or Nissan Ecology Oriented, is an engine technology used to reduce fuel consumption and emission output while improving overall engine performance.
- CVTCS or Continuous Valve Timing Control System, is a Nissan automobile variable valve timing technology. The engine technology is used by Nissan to reduce fuel consumption and emission output while improving overall engine performance.
- e-POWER for its line of series hybrid vehicles using an electric traction motor derived from the one used in the Nissan Leaf, which draws power from a battery and generator driven by a gasoline engine.
- S-HYBRID for Smart and Simple micro hybrid vehicle powertrain with an auxiliary electric motor
- VVL or Variable Valve and Lift is a Nissan automobile variable valve timing technology.
- VVEL or Variable Valve Event and Lift is a Nissan automobile variable valve timing technology.
