= Nissan Leaf (first generation) =

Battery electric compact car

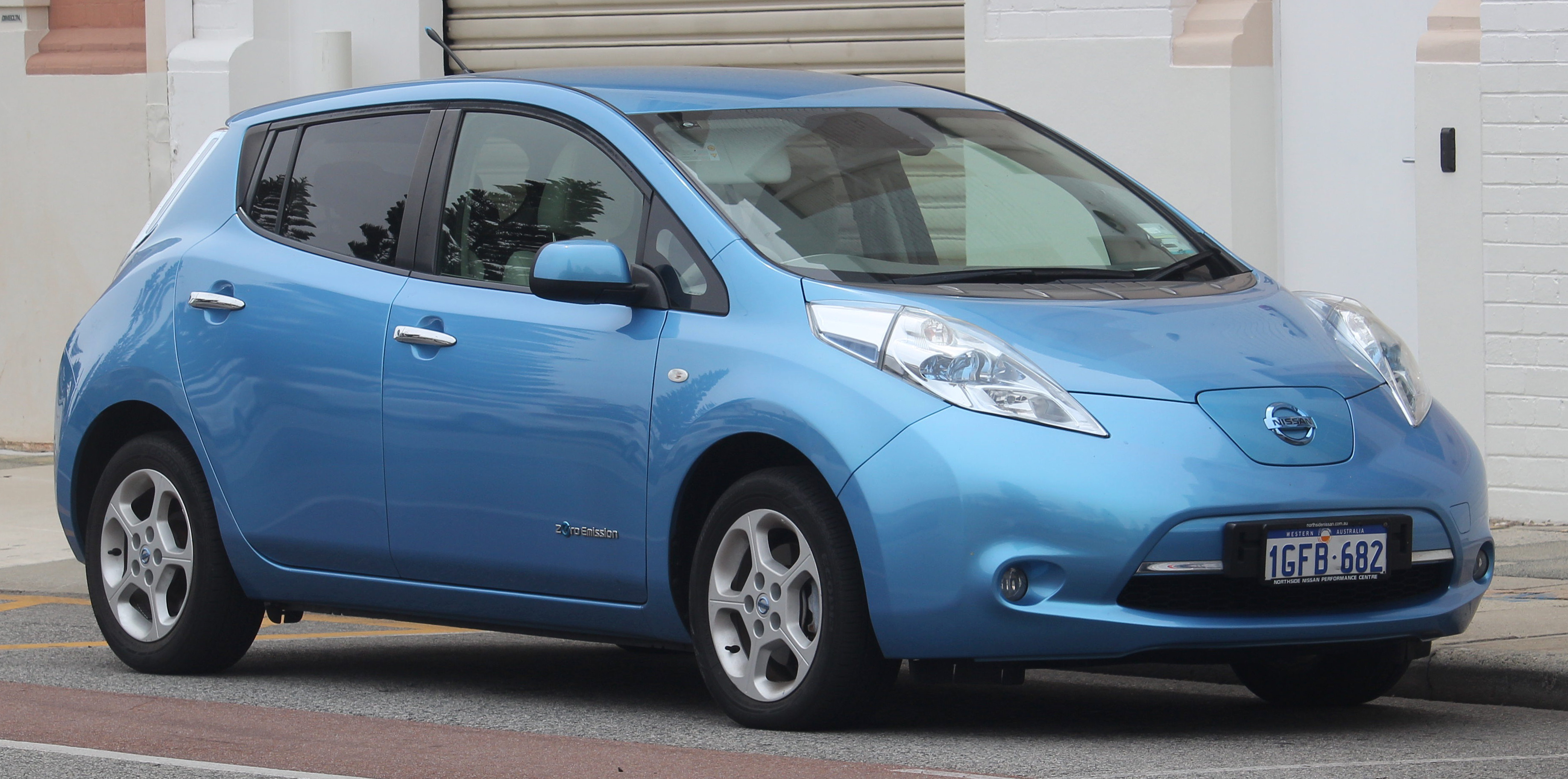

Overview
- Manufacturer: Nissan
- Model code: ZE0 (2010‍–‍2012); AZE0 (2013‍–‍2017)
- Also called: Venucia e30 (China)
- Production: October 2010 ‍–‍ September 2017
- Model years: 2011‍–‍2017
- Assembly: Japan: Yokosuka, Kanagawa (Oppama Plant); United States: Smyrna, Tennessee (Nissan Smyrna Assembly Plant); United Kingdom: Sunderland (NMUK)
- Designer: Kazuki Yamazaki and Masahide Fujiwara

Body and chassis
- Class: Compact car
- Body style: 5-door hatchback
- Layout: Front-motor, front-wheel-drive
- Platform: Nissan EV platform

Powertrain
- Electric motor: 80 kW EM61 (2010‍–‍2012) or EM57 (2013‍–‍2017), synchronous
- Transmission: Single-speed fixed; 2010‍–‍2012: 7.937:1 ratio; 2013‍–‍2017: 8.193:1 ratio
- Battery: 24 or 30 kWh lithium-ion
- Range: EPA: 117–172 km (73–107 mi); NEDC: 124–175 km (77–109 mi)
- Plug-in charging: AC onboard charger: Standard: 3.6 kW at 16 A; Optional: 6.6 kW at 27.5 A; DC: 22 kW; J1772 or Type 2 and CHAdeMO connectors

Dimensions
- Wheelbase: 2,700 mm (106.3 in)
- Length: 4,445 mm (175.0 in)
- Width: 1,770 mm (69.7 in)
- Height: 1,550 mm (61.0 in)
- Curb weight: 1,500–1,521 kg (3,307–3,354 lb)

Chronology
- Predecessor: Nissan Altra
- Successor: Nissan Leaf (second generation)

The first generation of the Nissan Leaf was manufactured by Japanese automaker Nissan from 2010 to 2017. It is a compact car whose name is a backronym for "leading environmentally-friendly affordable family car". It is the first mass-marketed and series-produced battery electric vehicle and was offered exclusively as a five-door hatchback.

The Leaf—Nissan's second battery-electric automobile—debuted on 2 August 2009. It was succeeded by the second generation in 2017. Before official production commencement, Nissan developed three prototype battery electric vehicles—dubbed the EV-01, EV-02 and EV-11. The Leaf followed the unsuccessful Altra and began production in Japan on 22 October 2010. The Smyrna plant commenced manufacture of the Leaf on 13 December 2012, and the Sunderland plant followed on 27 March 2013. It was launched in Japan and the United States in December 2010, with subsequent introductions in several European countries and Canada in 2011.

Initially, the Leaf was available exclusively with a large battery pack composed of 192 flat, laminated lithium-ion cells developed in collaboration with NEC, which offers advantages such as simplified design, efficient cooling, and optimal packaging. The battery pack is located under the floor and between the wheels, optimising the vehicle's handling and interior space. The 80 kW (110 hp) AC electric motor can be powered for up to 100 miles (160 km) when the battery is fully charged. Recharging can take 16 hours on 120 V or 8 hours on 230 V power. Fast charging is also available with a specific charger, which can restore 80% of the battery capacity in approximately 30 minutes.

The Leaf has garnered both acclaim and criticism from multiple automotive critics. Car and Driver, an American automotive magazine, expressed unfavourable opinions about the inexpensive materials used in the vehicle, asserting that they seem more fitting for a car priced at half its actual cost. However, they commended the Leaf for its spacious boot/trunk, along with features like standard heated seats and, in higher-end models, a heated steering wheel and leather seats. Opinions on the battery performance and safety aspects vary, with some finding the battery and range underwhelming and others expressing concerns about safety levels.

== Development ==
Nissan introduced its first battery electric vehicle, the Nissan Altra, at the Los Angeles International Auto Show on 29 December 1997. The Altra EV was in production from 1998 to 2002, with a limited production of approximately 200 vehicles primarily used as fleet vehicles for companies such as electric utilities. During the same period, Nissan also developed the Nissan Hypermini, conducting a demonstration programme and selling a limited number to government and corporate fleets in Japan from 1999 to 2001. A small fleet of Hyperminis underwent field testing in various Californian cities between 2001 and 2005.

In 2009, Nissan unveiled the EV-11 prototype electric car, which was based on the Nissan Tiida hatchback. The prototype featured a substitution of the conventional gasoline engine with an all-electric system, comprising an 80 kW (110 hp)/280 N⋅m (210 lbf⋅ft) electric motor, a 24 kWh lithium-ion battery pack with an estimated range of 175 km (109 miles) on the United States Environmental Protection Agency's LA-4 or "city" driving cycle. Noteworthy features included a navigation system and remote control and monitoring capabilities via a cellphone connection through Nissan's secure data centre to the car. The technology in the EV-11 had previously undergone development and testing in the EV-01 and EV-02 test cars, both equipped with an all-electric powertrain and using the Nissan Cube (Z11) as a development mule. The EV-11 prototype was publicly showcased on 26 July 2009. A week later, on 2 August 2009, Nissan unveiled the Leaf at its Yokohama headquarters and committed to initiating retail sales in both the North American market and Japan by the end of 2010.

== Manufacture ==
Nissan has an installed capacity to produce 250,000 Leafs per year; 150,000 at Smyrna, U.S., 50,000 at Oppama, Japan, and 50,000 at Sunderland, England.

=== Oppama, Japan ===
The first vehicles sold in the U.S. were produced at Nissan's plant in Oppama, Japan, which started production on 22 October 2010. The plant has an annual production capacity of 50,000 vehicles. Production of the electric car faced disruption for several months starting in March 2011 due to the earthquake and tsunami in Japan. Consequently, Nissan fell short of its 2011 production target of 50,000 Leafs. Anticipating a rebound in production and an expanded market presence, Nissan aimed to boost sales to 40,000 units in 2012, up from 20,000 in 2011. This strategy involved normalising production output and introducing the Leaf to additional European countries and regional markets in the U.S.

Despite cumulative sales exceeding 49,000 Leafs by December 2012, Nissan experienced only a 22% increase in sales during 2012, which Nissan CEO Carlos Ghosn deemed "a disappointment for us." He attributed this to factors such as the adverse dollar-yen exchange rate affecting the Leaf's price. Recognising the pricing issues with the original Leaf models, Ghosn highlighted the decision to reduce the price of the 2013 model year Leaf by 18%. This reduction was made possible by the initiation of U.S. production of the electric car on a new assembly line in Smyrna, Tennessee, contributing to lowered production costs. Nissan has also implemented measures to enhance production efficiency and decrease component costs, with a particular focus on the battery pack—the most expensive component of the vehicle.

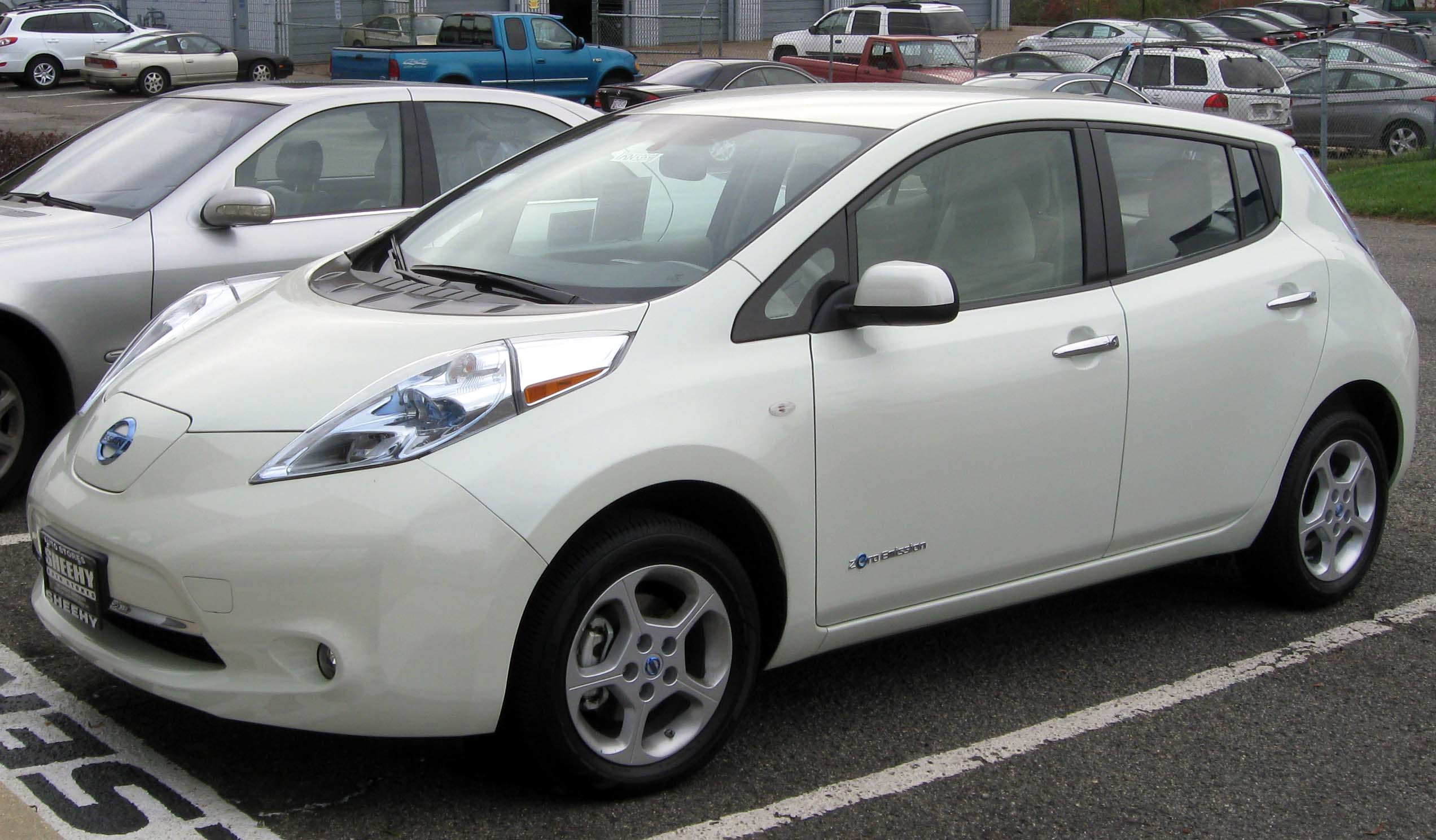
Prior to early 2013, Nissan Leafs destined for the U.S. were imported from Japan. The model pictured is a Japanese-import adapted for the U.S. market, as shown by its amber reflectors.

=== Smyrna, U.S. ===
Commercial production in the United States commenced on 9 January 2013 at Nissan's manufacturing facility in Smyrna, Tennessee. The plant underwent modifications, supported by a US$1.4 billion loan from the U.S. Department of Energy, enabling the production of the Nissan Leaf and its advanced batteries. The Smyrna plant was anticipated to manufacture up to 150,000 Leaf and 200,000 battery packs annually. Nissan initially planned to unveil the upgraded 2013 model year Nissan Leaf for the North American market in December 2012, but the introduction was rescheduled to January 2013 during the North American International Auto Show. The Smyrna plant began producing lithium-ion cells on 13 December 2012. These cells are utilised in the battery pack of the 2013 model year Leaf manufactured at the adjacent assembly plant. The cell fabrication factory in Smyrna that builds automotive-scale lithium-ion batteries can produce batteries for up to 200,000 electric vehicles a year.

=== Sunderland, United Kingdom ===
Production of the Leaf at Nissan's Sunderland plant in England commenced on 28 March 2013. Nissan secured a £20.7 million grant from the British government and up to £220 million from the European Investment Bank. With a capacity to produce 60,000 lithium-ion batteries and 50,000 Leafs annually, the plant caters exclusively to the European market.

== Safety ==
Euro NCAP test results* 5-door RHD hatchback (2012)
Test	Points	%
Overall:	5 /5 stars	
Adult occupant:	31.9	89%
Child occupant:	40.4	83%
Pedestrian:	23.4	65%
Safety assist:	5.9	84%

The 2011 and 2012 model years received a five-star overall rating from the National Highway Traffic Safety Administration (NHTSA), while the 2013 and 2014 model years are rated four stars overall. The latter rating is attributed to lower scores in front and side tests for passengers.

The Nissan Leaf was awarded with the "Top Safety Pick" designation by the Insurance Institute for Highway Safety (IIHS) in 2011. The Leaf received top ratings of "Good" for front, side, and rear impact crash tests, and also on rollover protection. The injury measurements except one received a "Good" rating, indicating a relatively low risk of significant injuries in crashes based on the IIHS's severity scale. In 2012, the European New Car Assessment Programme (Euro NCAP) conducted testing on a Nissan Leaf. The specific model subjected to the assessment was a 1,545 kg (3,406 lb), right-hand-drive, 80 kW (110 hp) small family hatchback. Electronic stability control was included as standard equipment and successfully met Euro NCAP's test requirements. The driver and front passenger seats are equipped with a standard seatbelt reminder system. Additionally, a driver-set speed limitation device is also part of the standard equipment.

Warning sounds

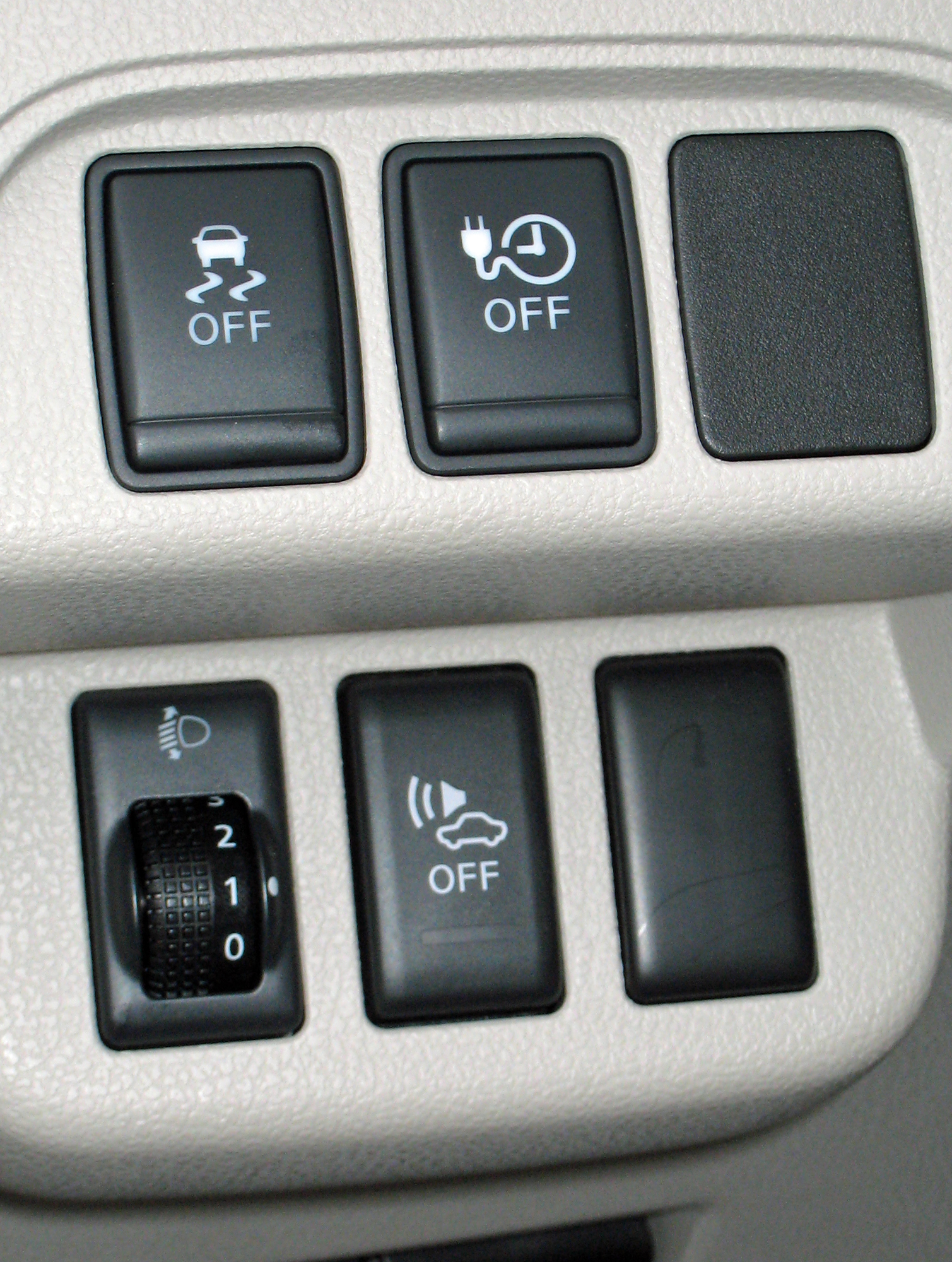
2011 Nissan Leaf featuring the warning sound off switch

In response to the considerable noise reduction inherent in electric vehicles operating at low speeds, the 2011 Nissan Leaf incorporates digital warning sounds—distinct for forward and reverse motions—to notify pedestrians, including those with visual impairments, and others of its presence. Nissan introduced the Vehicle Sound for Pedestrians (VSP) system for this purpose, also utilised in the Nissan Fuga hybrid. The VSP system generates audible alerts detectable by individuals outside the vehicle while avoiding distraction to occupants inside. During the sound's development, Nissan conducted behavioral research on the visually impaired, collaborating with cognitive and acoustic psychologists. The sine-wave sound system spans from 2.5 kHz to 600 Hz, ensuring audibility across age groups. It produces varying high-low sounds based on speed, acceleration, or deceleration, ceasing at 30 km/h (18.6 mph) and resuming below 25 km/h (16 mph). The 2011 model allowed drivers to temporarily disable the sounds, but the system automatically resets to "On" at the next ignition cycle. Controlled by a computer and synthesizer in the dash panel, the sound emanates from a speaker in the front driver's side wheel well. Nissan discontinued the option to disable the pedestrian alert from the 2012 model onward, anticipating a U.S. ruling by the National Highway Traffic Safety Administration (NHTSA).

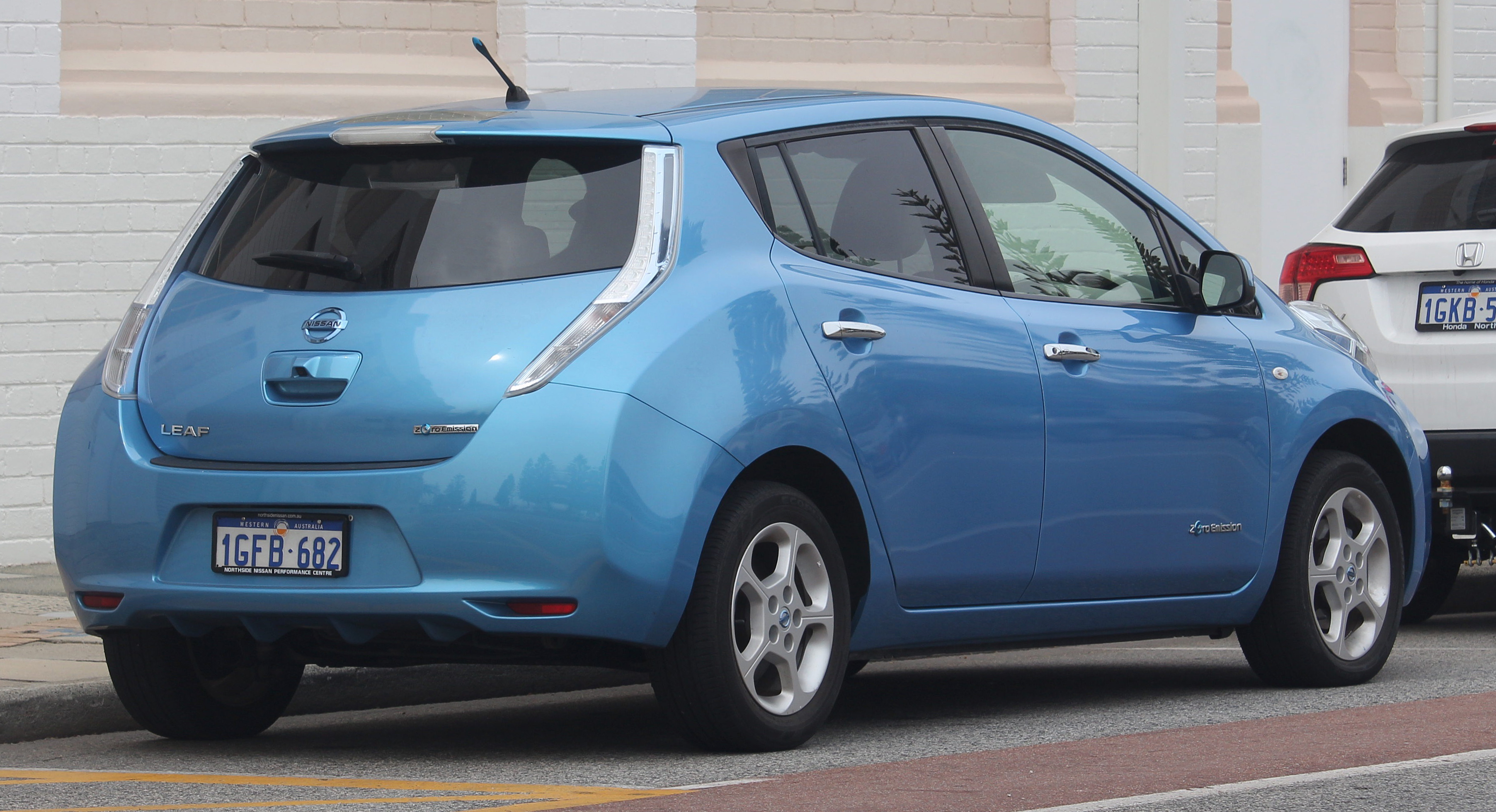
2013 Nissan Leaf (ZE0 MY13) hatchback (Australia)

Upon publicising the new sounds, the U.S. National Federation of the Blind commented that "while we were pleased that the alert existed, we were unhappy that the driver could turn it off." In the United Kingdom, compliance with local regulations necessitated the removal of the Leaf's electric warning sound, as the law mandates the capability to disable any hazard warning sound between 11:00 pm and 6:00 am—a feature not supported by the Leaf's audible warning system.

Safety protection

The Leaf's battery pack benefits from protective structural steel reinforcement, safeguarding it against crash damage. To prevent shock and fire hazards, the Leaf is equipped with a battery safety system triggered during a crash involving the deployment of airbags. The airbag control unit signals a mechanical disconnection of the high voltage from the vehicle. In December 2011, Nissan reported, as an indication of the Leaf safety performance, that none of the around two dozen Leafs that were destroyed during the March 2011 tsunami caught fire and their batteries remained intact. As of December 2011, no fires after a crash have been reported in the U.S. associated with the Leaf or other plug-in electric cars available in the market.

== Features ==
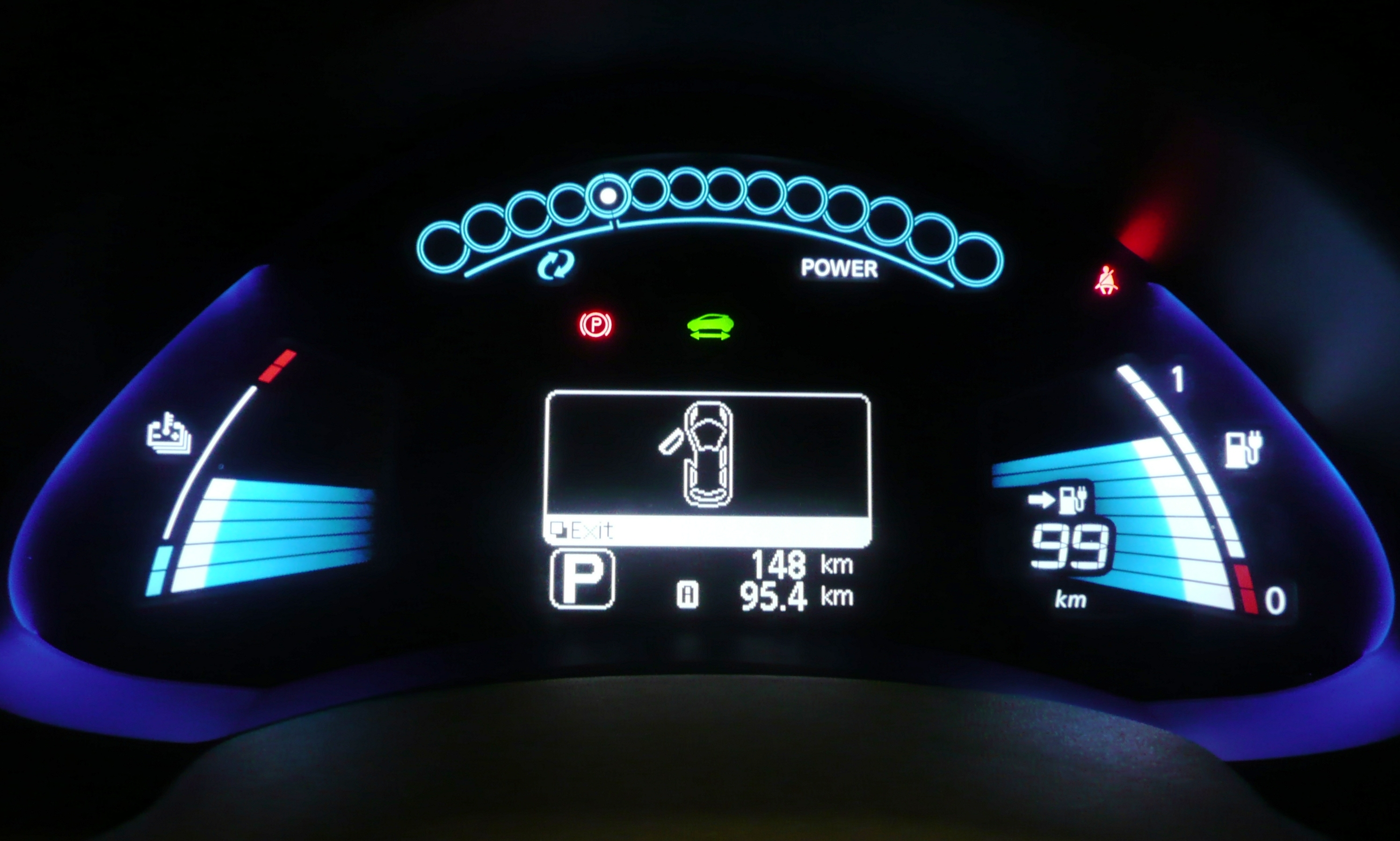
Leaf's main dashboard digital display showing driving range (on right) and other performance parameters

The Leaf incorporates the CarWings telematics system, initially exclusive to Japan. Operated via a GPRS radio, akin to mobile phone connectivity, CarWings engages whenever the car is within cell tower range. This system enables various user functionalities, including mapping the car's position, estimating range, and identifying available charging stations. It tracks and compiles statistics on distance travelled and energy consumption, generating daily, monthly, and annual reports displayed on the Leaf's digital screens. All information is available on the Leaf's digital screens. Owners can remotely control the air-conditioner, heater, and charging functions through a smartphone app or secure web page, even when the vehicle is powered down. This feature allows pre-heating or pre-cooling during charging, minimising battery usage for climate control. The onboard timer allows pre-programmed charging during off-peak rates. Additionally, the Leaf's SL trim incorporates a small solar panel on the roof/spoiler, providing a trickle charge to the auxiliary battery.

== Sustainability ==
=== Fuel economy ===
In its five-cycle testing, the United States Environmental Protection Agency (EPA) determined the 2011 model Leaf's energy consumption to be 0.212 kWh/km (34 kWh/100 miles). The Leaf received a combined fuel economy rating of 99 miles per gallon gasoline equivalent (MPGe) (2.4 L/100 km), equivalent to 106 mpg_{‑US} (2.2 L/100 km; 127 mpg_{‑imp}) in city driving and 92 mpg_{‑US} (2.6 L/100 km; 110 mpg_{‑imp}) on highways. For the 2013 model year, it achieved a 15% improvement in its EPA fuel economy combined ratings. According to the EPA, the 2013 Leaf improved its energy consumption to 115 mpg‑e (29 kW⋅h/100 mi; 18.2 kW⋅h/100 km) from 99 mpg‑e (34 kW⋅h/100 mi; 21 kW⋅h/100 km), giving 129 mpg‑e (26 kW⋅h/100 mi; 16.2 kW⋅h/100 km) in city driving and 102 mpg‑e (33 kW⋅h/100 mi; 21 kW⋅h/100 km) on highways.

According to the EPA, the 2014 and 2015 model year Leafs have an energy consumption of 30 kWh/100 miles, for a combined city/highway rating of 114 mpg‑e (30 kW⋅h/100 mi; 18.4 kW⋅h/100 km); 126 MPGe (26.7 kW⋅h/100 mi; 16.6 kW⋅h/100 km) city and 101 MPGe (33.4 kW⋅h/100 mi; 20.7 kW⋅h/100 km) highway. The 2016 Leaf with the smaller 24 kWh battery has the same ratings and energy consumption as the 2014/15 models, while the trims with the larger 30 kWh has the same energy consumption of 30 kWh/100 miles, but was rated 112 MPGe (30.1 kW⋅h/100 mi; 18.7 kW⋅h/100 km) for combined city/highway; 124 MPGe (27.2 kW⋅h/100 mi; 16.9 kW⋅h/100 km) city and 101 MPGe (33.4 kW⋅h/100 mi; 20.7 kW⋅h/100 km) highway.

=== Environmental footprint ===
In February 2014, the Automotive Science Group (ASG) conducted a comprehensive study assessing the life cycle of over 1,300 automobiles in nine categories sold in North America. The findings revealed that, among advanced automotive technologies, the Nissan Leaf demonstrated the smallest life-cycle environmental footprint of any model year 2014 automobile available in the North American market with a minimum four-person occupancy. The study concluded that the increased environmental impacts of manufacturing the battery electric technology are more than offset by the enhanced environmental performance during operational life. The assessment utilised the average electricity mix of the U.S. grid in 2014.

In December 2014, Nissan announced that Leaf owners have collectively driven 1 billion kilometres (625 million miles). This amount of electric distance translates into avoiding 180 million kilograms of CO_{2} emissions by driving an electric car in comparison to travelling with a gasoline-powered car. In December 2016, Nissan reported that Leaf owners worldwide achieved the milestone of 3 billion kilometres (1.9 billion miles) driven collectively through November 2016, saving nearly 500 million kilograms of CO_{2} emissions.

== Specifications ==
In North America, the Nissan Leaf falls under the classification of a compact car, while in the UK, it is categorised as a small family car or a C-segment car. The Leaf's boot/trunk space is rated at 24 cu ft (679.6 L) with rear seats up and 30 cu ft (849.5 L) with rear seats down. The lower portion of the vehicle is equipped with aerodynamic panelling aimed at minimising drag and enhancing overall aerodynamics. Nissan states that the 2011 model year Leaf has a drag coefficient of Cd=0.29 which was further improved to Cd=0.28 in 2012 for the 2013 model year. American automotive magazine Car and Driver, using a wind tunnel, measured a drag coefficient of Cd=0.32 for the 2012 model year Leaf.

=== Battery ===
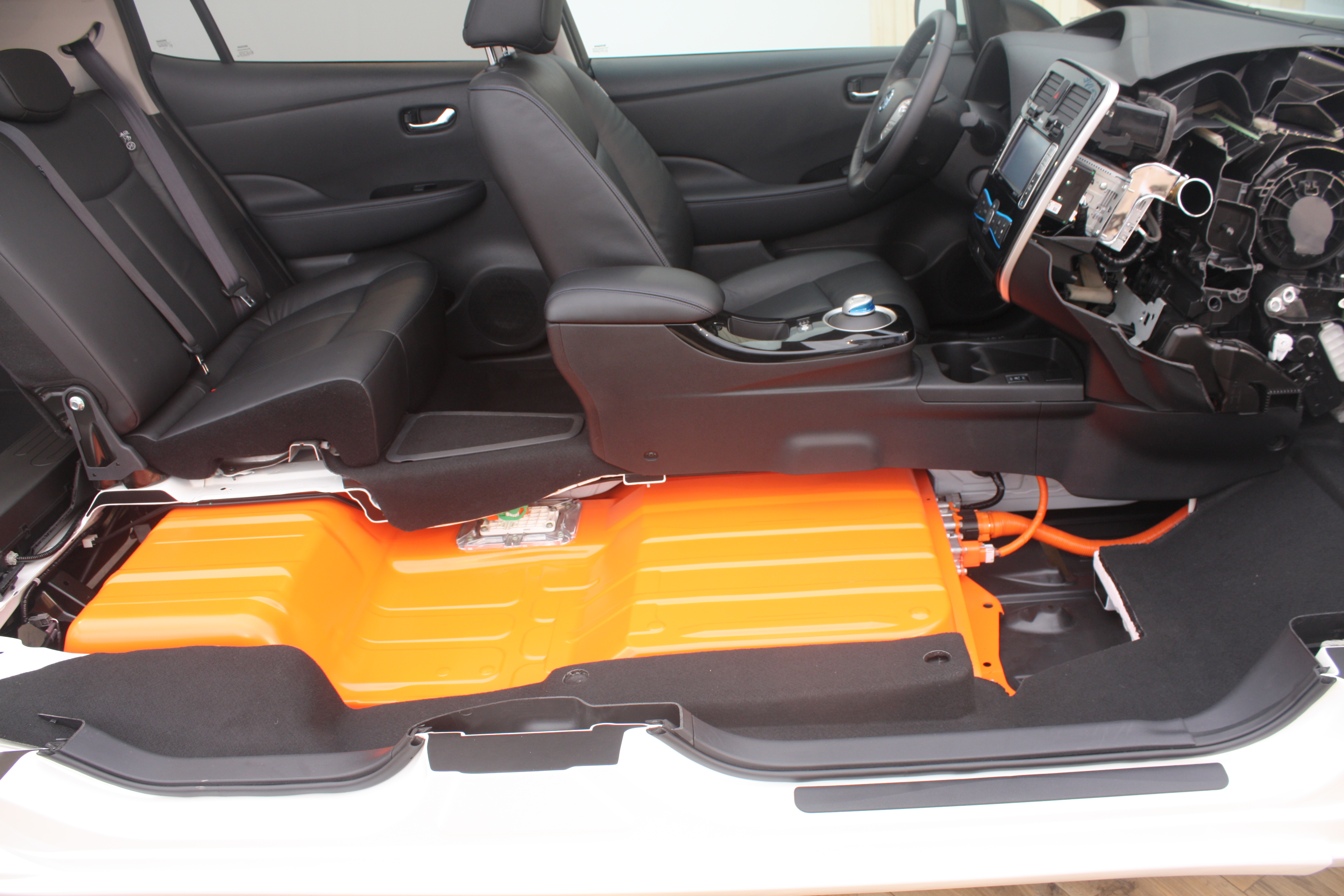
Cutaway of a 2013 Nissan Leaf revealing its lithium-ion battery pack.

The battery was developed and engineered by the Automotive Energy Supply Corporation (AESC), a joint venture between Nissan, NEC, and NEC Energy Devices. Its placement and distribution—below the seats and rear foot space—help lower of the car's centre of gravity and increase structural rigidity compared to a conventional five-door hatchback. The battery comprises 48 modules, each accommodating four battery cells, culminating in a total of 192 cells. The battery's nominal capacity is rated at 24.15 kWh, while its usable capacity was assessed at 21.381 kWh. The battery and control module together weigh 218 kg (480 lb) the specific energy of the cells is 140 W·h/kg. In 2011, Nissan projected a minimum battery lifespan of 10 years, retaining 80% usable capacity after five years. However, data collected from over 400,000 Leafs sold in Europe indicated a battery lifespan of 22 years, surpassing the initial presumption by 10‍–‍12 years.

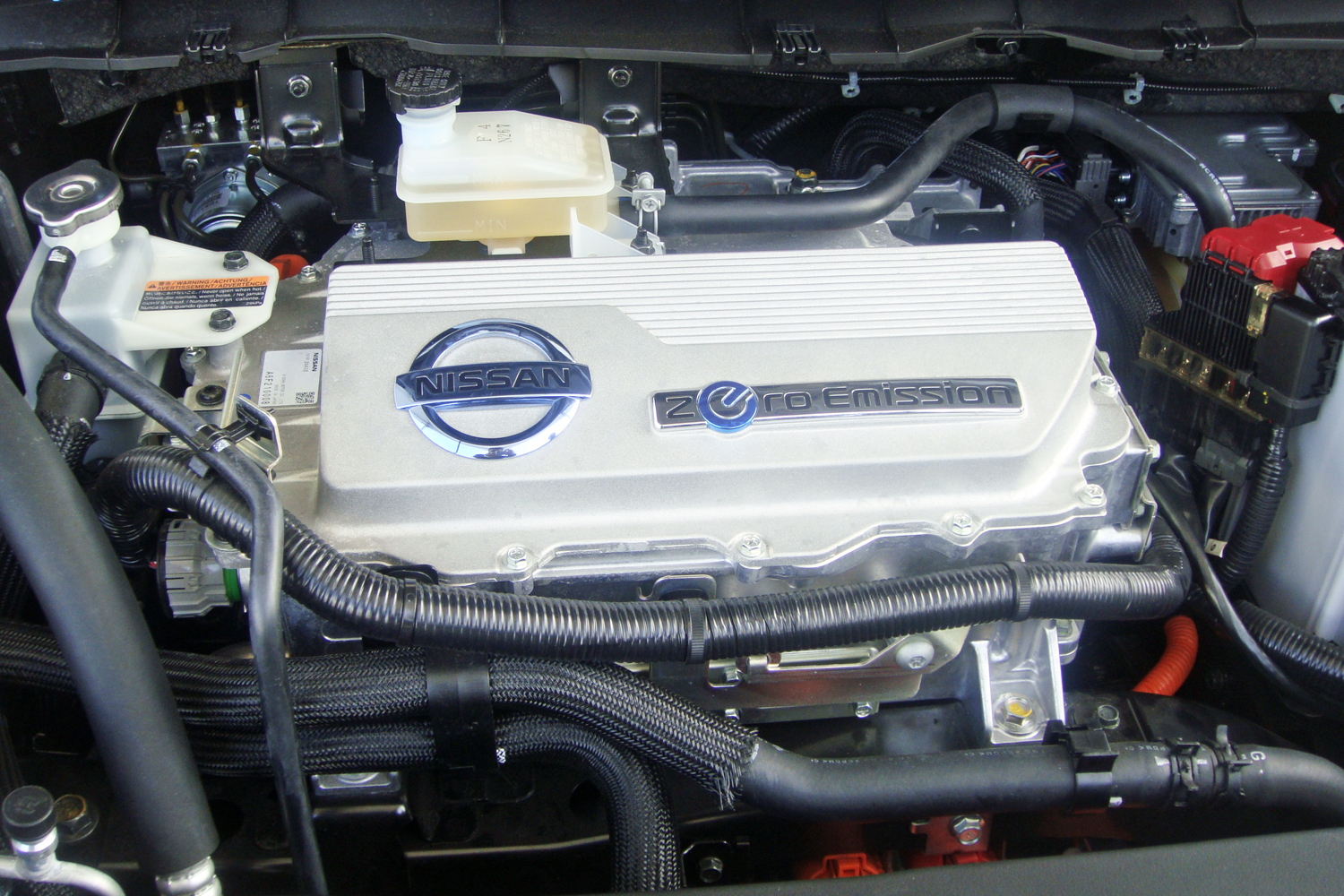
Electronic control unit

Nissan provided guidelines to help owners enhance the longevity and charging performance of the lithium-ion battery. These recommendations include avoiding extended exposure to ambient temperatures exceeding 120 °F (49 °C) and refraining from storing the vehicle in temperatures below −13 °F (−25 °C) for more than 7 days. It is advisable to limit the state of charge to 70% to 80% when frequently using fast or quick charging and to allow the battery charge to drop below 80% before initiating a recharge. Owners are also cautioned against leaving the vehicle unattended for over 14 days, particularly when the Li-ion battery available charge gauge indicates zero or near-zero state of charge. In addition to the main battery, the Leaf also has an auxiliary 12-volt lead–acid battery that provides power to the car computer systems and accessories such as the audio system, supplemental restraint systems, headlights and windshield wipers.

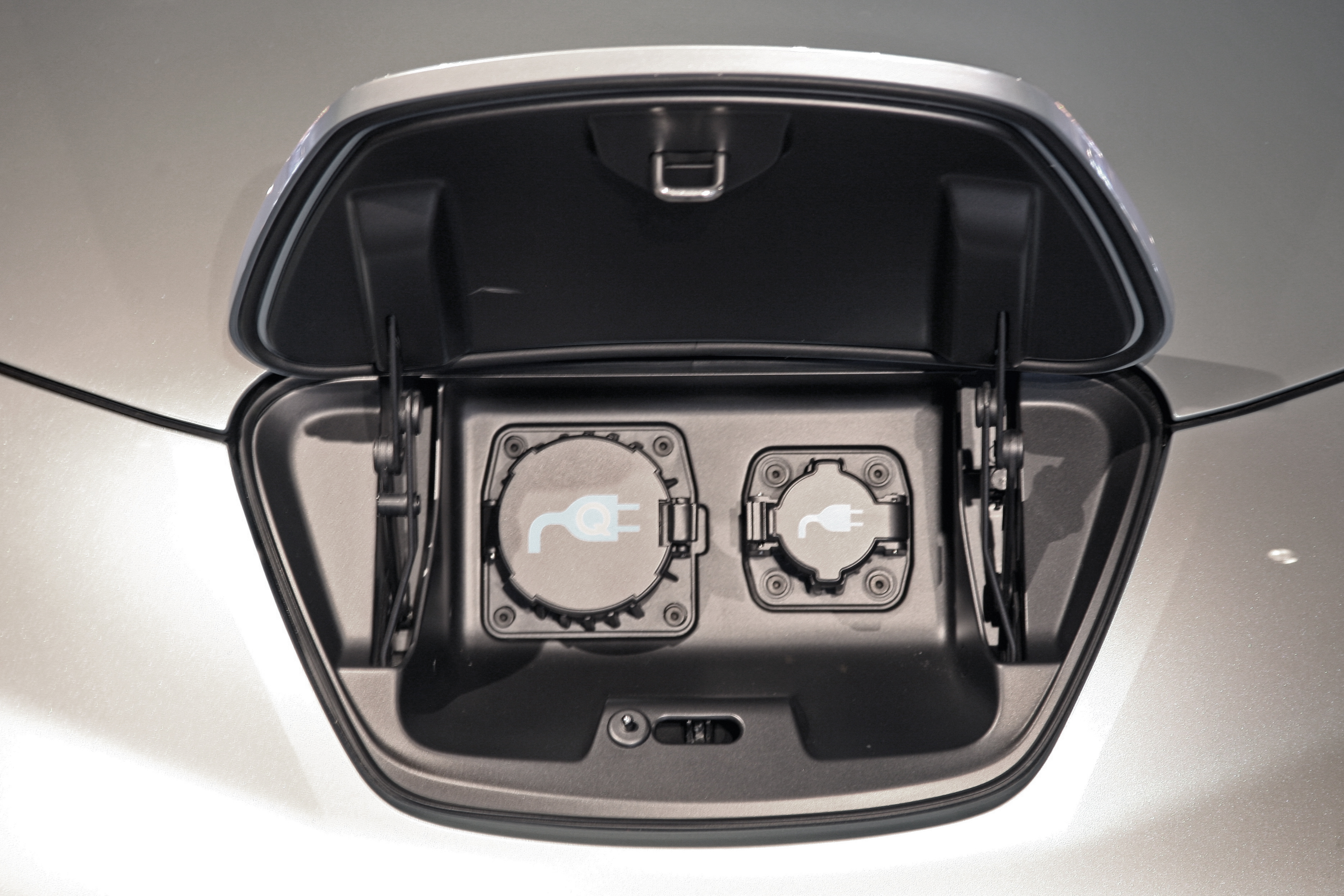
The Leaf's charging port with two inlets is located at the front of the car.

In the US market, SV and SL trims feature an SAE J1772 connector designed for (120/240 volts AC). Utilising standard mains electricity and the provided cable, the vehicle replenishes approximately 5 miles (8.0 km) of range per hour. The SL trim offers an optional CHAdeMO port, enabling a charge from fully discharged to 80% capacity in approximately 30 minutes. Nissan cautions that if fast charging constitutes the primary method of recharging, a normal and gradual battery capacity loss of about 10% more than regular 240-volt charging may occur over a 10-year period. Various other make compatible charging stations, and both companies and local governments are actively involved in diverse initiatives to establish electric vehicle network of public charging stations for electric vehicles.

Models featuring a 3.6 kW onboard charger can achieve a full recharge from empty in seven to eight hours, using a 220/240-volt supply. Models equipped with a 6.6 kW onboard charger can be fully recharged in four hours from a 220/240-volt outlet.

=== Range ===
2011/12 model year

The United States Environmental Protection Agency officially rates the range of the Nissan Leaf at 117 kilometres (73 mi), significantly lower than Nissan's quoted figure of 160 kilometres (99 mi). The Federal Trade Commission (FTC), responsible for labeling alternative fuel vehicles, challenges the EPA's assessment, contending that the accurate range falls within 154 and 177 km (96 and 110 miles). Although the FTC does not conduct its own tests as EPA does, it relies on standards established by SAE International and the data provided by automakers. The Leaf has a range of 175 km (109 miles) on the New European Driving Cycle.

According to evaluations from third-party test drives conducted in the U.S., the actual range achievable on a single charge can fluctuate by up to 40% in real-world conditions. Reports indicate a range spanning from approximately 100 kilometres (62 mi) to nearly 222 kilometres (138 mi), contingent on factors such as driving habits, load, traffic conditions, weather (including wind and atmospheric density), and accessory usage. Nissan's own tests on the Leaf, conducted under various scenarios to estimate real-world range, yielded a worst-case scenario of 76 kilometres (47 mi) and a best-case scenario of 222 kilometres (138 mi). The table below summarises the results from each scenario tested using the EPA's L4 test cycle, with the EPA rating provided as a reference:

Summary of Nissan's results using EPA L4 test cycle operating the 2011 Leaf under different real-world scenarios
Driving condition	Speed		Temperature		Total drive duration	Range		Air conditioner
Driving condition	mph	km/h	°F	°C	Total drive duration	mi	km	Air conditioner
Cruising (ideal)	38	61	68	20	3 hr, 38 min	138	222	Off
City traffic	24	39	77	25	4 hr, 23 min	105	169	Off
Highway	55	89	95	35	1 hr, 16 min	70	110	In use
Winter, stop-and-go traffic	15	24	14	−10	4 hr, 08 min	62	100	Heater on
Heavy stop-and-go traffic	6	10	86	30	7 hr, 50 min	47	76	In use
EPA five-cycle tests	N/A					73	117	Varying

American organisation Consumer Reports conducted a test on a 2011/12 model Nissan Leaf loaner, evaluating its performance as a daily commuter in cold weather. The average range achieved was 105 km (65 miles) per charge, with temperatures ranging from 20 to 30 °F (−7 to −1 °C). During one trip in temperatures as low as 10 °F (−12 °C), the range indicator started at 32 km (20 miles). After covering 13 km (8 miles), the Leaf experienced a drastic loss of power, gradually slowing down until the final stretch was completed at almost walking speed. Consumer Reports concluded that while the Leaf functions as designed in cold temperatures, there is a need for a more accurate range panel indicator.

In June 2011, Nissan observed that, on average, owners recharge their electric vehicles for two hours nightly, and some owners are able to cover two days on a single charge. In October 2011, Nissan North America provided insights from a larger sample of 7,500 Leafs on U.S. roads, indicating that the average driver covers 60 km (37 miles) daily, with an average trip length of 11 km (7 miles) measured as the distance between power on and power off.

2013 model year

The U.S. 2013 model year Leaf SV and SL models introduced a more efficient heat pump based heating system that allows the Leaf to extend its range in cold-weather conditions by 32 to 40 km (20 to 25 miles). The EPA rating increased from 117 km (73 miles) in previous models to 121 km (75 miles). Nissan clarified that the ratings are not directly comparable due to changes in EPA test procedures for electric cars in 2013. Before 2013, the agency estimated the range assuming the battery pack was charged to 100% of its capacity. Nissan estimated that the MY2013 Leaf has a range figure of 135 kilometres (84 mi) from a 100% charge (Long-Distance Mode) and a figure of 106 kilometres (66 mi) from an 80% charge (Long-Life Mode). The new EPA testing procedure considers the average of these two ranges. The improved Long-Distance Mode range results from enhancements to the regenerative braking system, overall weight reduction, and improved aerodynamics.

The 2013 European version, has a certified range of 200 km (120 miles) under the New European Driving Cycle (NEDC), up from 175 km (109 miles) for the 2011/12 model.

2014/15 model year

The official EPA range for the 2014 and 2015 model year Leaf, increased from 121 to 135 km (75 to 84 miles). The difference in range is due to a technicality, as Nissan decided to eliminate the EPA blended range rating, which was an average of the 80% charge range and the 100% charge range. For the 2014 model year, only the 100% charge range figure applies.

2016 model year

Nissan enhanced the car's range on a full charge by incorporating a larger battery capacity. The SL and SV trims are equipped with a 30 kWh battery, while the S trim originally retained the smaller 24 kWh battery from earlier Leaf models. However, during the 2016 model year, Nissan transitioned the base Leaf S model from a 24 kWh to a 30 kWh battery.

The 2016 Nissan Leaf equipped with the 30 kWh battery has an official EPA range of 172 km (107 miles), while the NEDC estimates the range to be 249 km (155 miles). The range for the Leaf with the smaller 24 kWh is 135 km (84 miles), the same as the 2014/15 model year.

== Related cars ==
Nissan unveiled the Nissan Leaf Aero Style concept car at the 2011 Tokyo Auto Salon. The Leaf Aero Style exterior has a new front bumper, extended side skirts, restyled mirrors, LED daytime driving lights, and special wheels.

Nissan unveiled the Leaf Nismo RC (Racing Competition) demonstration car at the 2011 New York International Auto Show. This electric car has the same battery pack and motor as the Leaf but is designed and constructed as a racing car with a full carbon fiber monocoque body which makes it about 40% lighter than the production Leaf. Leaf Nismo RC is projected to have a running time of around 20 minutes under racing conditions, and in preliminary testing it accelerated from 0 to 62 mph (0 to 100 km/h) in 6.85 seconds and has a top speed of 93 mph (150 km/h). Nissan built eight of these rear-wheel drive cars.

Nismo introduced another concept from at the 2011 Tokyo Motor Show, known as the Leaf Nismo Concept. Designed as a standard highway-capable vehicle, it shares the same 80 kW electric motor as the standard Leaf. Nissan announced in January 2013 that the Leaf Nismo would be manufactured in limited quantities by mid-2013, exclusively for the Japanese market. While maintaining the Leaf's electric drivetrain without additional power enhancements, the Leaf Nismo features an aerodynamic body kit influenced by the electric Leaf RC demonstrator, new alloy wheels, and interior improvements.

The Infiniti LE is a battery electric, compact executive concept car that was unveiled at the 2012 New York International Auto Show. Built on the same platform as the Leaf, it was anticipated to serve as Nissan's luxury electric car and was initially slated for production in 2014. However, in May 2013, the company announced a delay, citing the need to await inductive charging industry standards before launching the vehicle. Ultimately, the Infiniti LE never proceeded to production.

Nissan and its joint venture partner, Dongfeng Motor unveiled a production version of the Venucia e30 electric car at the 2012 Auto Guangzhou. An earlier version, the Venucia E-Concept, was unveiled at the 2012 Beijing Auto Show. Initially scheduled for production in China by 2015, the Venucia e30 was officially launched in the Chinese market in September 2014. The Venucia e30 shares the bodywork, dimensions, electric-drive specifications and several other aspects of the Leaf. Dongfeng Nissan started pilot projects in 15 Chinese cities to promote the Venucia e30 with local governments. In April 2014, Dongfeng Nissan announced an earlier-than-scheduled start to retail sales for the Venucia e30. Sales halted in 2017 and the nameplate was replaced by a rebadged Renault City K-ZE in 2019.

== Awards ==
In 2010, the Leaf received the Green Car Vision Award at the Washington Auto Show from the Green Car Journal. The Journal commended the Leaf for offering features, styling, and a driving experience that caters to a sophisticated market, while producing zero localised emissions and requiring no petroleum fuels. Popular Mechanics, upon awarding the Leaf its 2010 Breakthrough Award, explained that the Nissan Leaf is "not the first pure EV, but [...] hits the mainstream like none of its predecessors." Popular Mechanics also alluded to the Leaf's 160 km (100 miles) range, which is said to be "enough for most commuters for the price of an average vehicle – and with a much lower operating cost than gasoline-powered vehicles."

The Leaf garnered several other notable awards, including the 2011 European Car of the Year, the 2011 Eco-Friendly Car of the Year by Cars.com, and the 2011 Green Fleet Electric Vehicle of the Year. Mother Earth News included it among the "Best Green Cars" of 2011, and also was ranked first in Kelley Blue Book Top 10 Green Cars for 2011. It Leaf achieved global recognition by winning the 2011 World Car of the Year and being a finalist for the 2011 World Green Car. Ward's Auto also acknowledged the Leaf's 80 kW electric motor in its 2011 list of Ward's 10 Best Engines. Furthermore, at the Tokyo Motor Show in December 2011, the Leaf was awarded with the 2011‍–‍2012 Car of the Year Japan.

== Reception ==
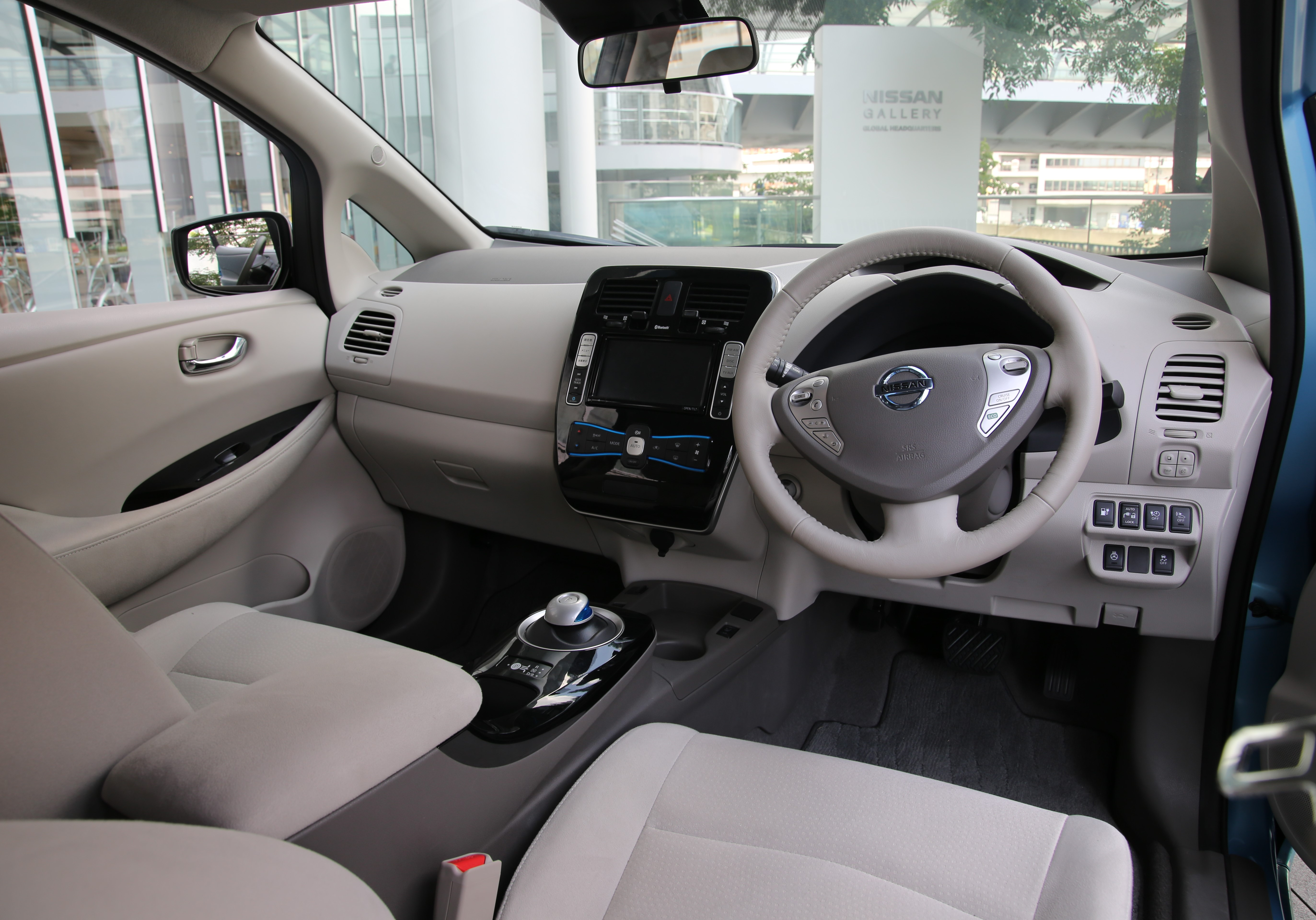
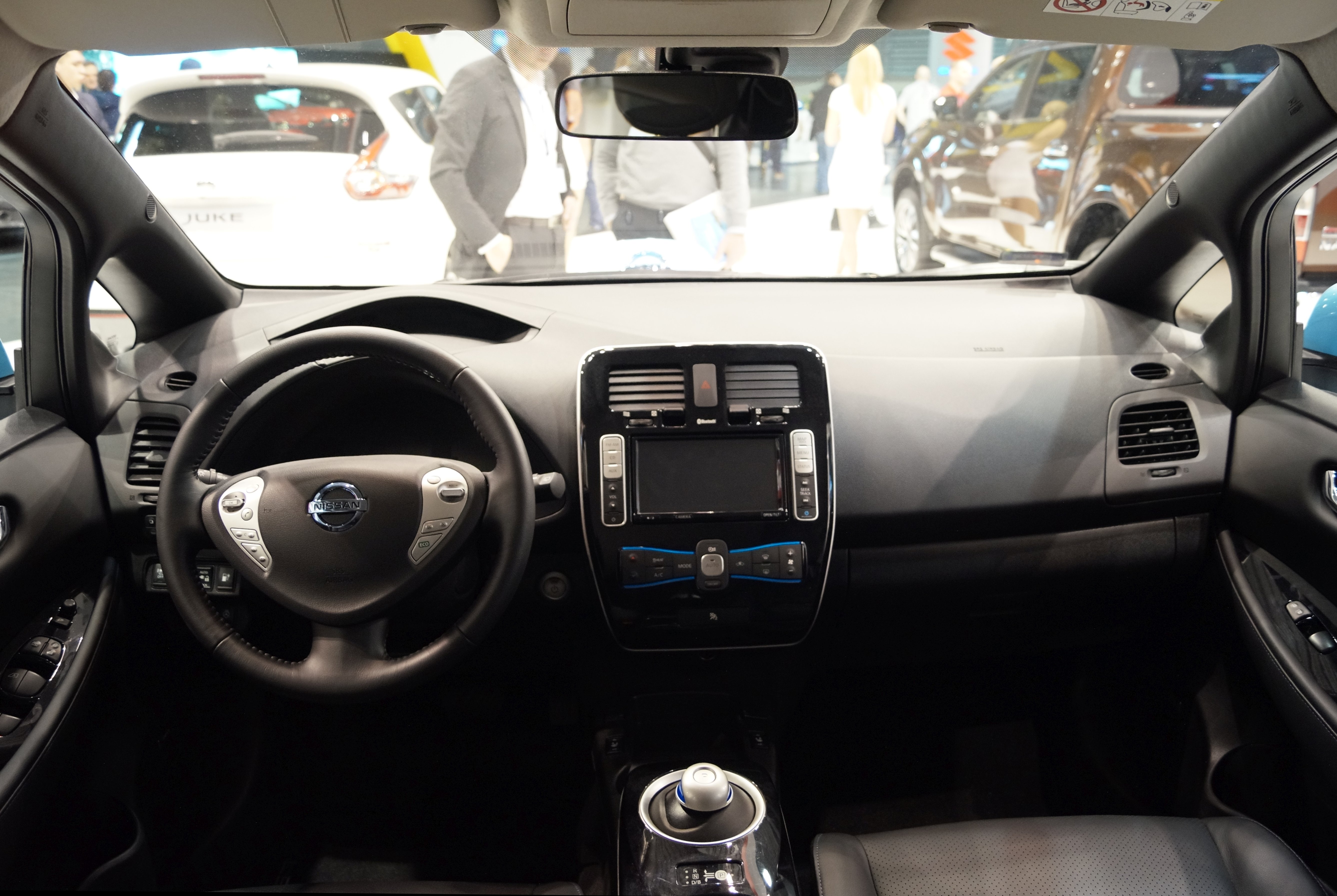
The Leaf offered interior design options in both white (left) and black (right). The white variants feature light brown trim throughout.

American magazine Car and Driver criticised the Leaf for having only one 12-volt accessory port. The magazine pointed out that, despite expectations of an electric vehicle being capable of charging a cell phone continuously, the Leaf's 192 lithium-ion battery cells prioritise energy for forward motion. Any power allocation to non-propulsion features, such as headlights, air conditioning, and the stereo, is noted to impact the vehicle's maximum range, emphasising the cost associated with diverting energy from the primary function. Car and Driver noted the use of inexpensive materials in the vehicle, deeming them more appropriate for a car half its actual price. Nevertheless, the magazine praised it for its spacious trunk and standard heated seats and, in higher-end models, a heated steering wheel and leather seats.

British magazine What Car? characterised the car as easy to drive, cost-effective to operate, and spacious. Nevertheless, they raised concerns about its compact boot, extended charging time, and diminished range in cold weather conditions. They described the equipment levels as "generous," stating that the entry-level model features a commendable amount of standard features. British magazine car described the Leaf as both "soothing and stressful." The soothing aspects include a relaxing drive, minimal vibrations, and a quiet cabin. Commendation was given for its comfortable seats and its "inviting" interior. However, the process of unplugging and coiling the cable into the boot before departure was likened by Car as the "21st-century equivalent of hand cranking your car," often resulting in a wet cable that accumulates leaves. Car also expressed concerns about the vehicle's poor battery life in cold weather and the frequent need for charging.

British newspaper The Guardian described the Leaf's styling as "quirky," admiring its headlights likened to "frogs' eyes." The newspaper stated that it is fun to drive in a "dodgem-like way," praising its fast acceleration and its effective performance in snowy conditions. British service company RAC praised its sufficient amount of space, describing it as "bright and airy." They commended the good quality materials used throughout, the equitable amount of rear leg and headroom, and its respectable luggage capacity, given its large battery pack.
