= Nissan TB engine =

Overview
- Manufacturer: Nissan Machinery
- Production: 1987-2023

Layout
- Configuration: Naturally aspirated Straight-6
- Displacement: 4.2 L; 254.4 cu in (4,169 cc); 4.5 L; 273.3 cu in (4,479 cc); 4.8 L; 290.4 cu in (4,759 cc)
- Cylinder bore: 96 mm (3.78 in); 99.5 mm (3.92 in)
- Piston stroke: 96 mm (3.78 in); 102 mm (4.02 in)
- Valvetrain: OHV, DOHC w/VTC

Combustion
- Fuel system: 2-bbl. carburettor Electronic fuel injection
- Fuel type: Gasoline
- Cooling system: Water cooled

Output
- Power output: 175–280 PS (129–206 kW; 173–276 bhp)
- Torque output: 32–46 kg⋅m (314–451 N⋅m; 231–333 lb⋅ft)

Chronology
- Predecessor: Nissan P engine

The Nissan TB straight-six petrol engine was released in 1987 as the TB42. Bore and stroke were 96 mm × 96 mm (3.78 in × 3.78 in). Cubic capacity was 4,169 cc (4.2 L; 254.4 cu in) displacement). The engine was released with a two-barrel carburettor and a point type distributor. It was used in the Nissan Patrol Y60 and Y61 series.

== Variants ==
=== TB42E and TB42S ===
In 1992 the TB42E emerged with electronic fuel injection and electronic ignition. At this time the TB42 was re-labeled as TB42S.
OHV
175 PS (129 kW; 173 bhp) at 4200 rpm
32.6 kg⋅m (320 N⋅m; 236 lb⋅ft) at 3200 rpm

- Nissan Patrol series Y60 & Nissan Patrol series Y61

=== TB45E and TB45S ===
In 1997 the TB45 was produced. The cylinder bore was increased to 99.5 mm (3.92 in) but the stroke remained at 96 mm (3.78 in). It was available as TB45S (with carburettor and electronic ignition) or TB45E (with electronic fuel injection and electronic ignition).
OHV
210 PS (154 kW; 207 bhp) at 4400 rpm
35.5 kg⋅m (348 N⋅m; 257 lb⋅ft) at 3600 rpm

- Nissan Safari & Nissan Patrol GU Y61

OHV
173 PS (127 kW; 171 bhp) at 4400 rpm
32 kg⋅m (314 N⋅m; 231 lb⋅ft) at 3600 rpm

- Nissan Civilian & Isuzu Journey series W41

=== TB48DE ===
In 2001 the TB48 surfaced, with bore x stroke of 99.5 mm × 102 mm (3.92 in × 4.02 in) and double overhead camshaft. Shadowing the mainstream TB42/45 they were released as plain engines. DOHC & Valve Timing Control
251 PS (185 kW; 248 bhp) at 4800 rpm
420 N⋅m (43 kg⋅m; 310 lb⋅ft) at 3600 rpm

- Nissan Safari & Nissan Patrol series Y61

== See also ==
- List of Nissan engines
