= Nissan VRT35 =

Nissan VRT35 engine
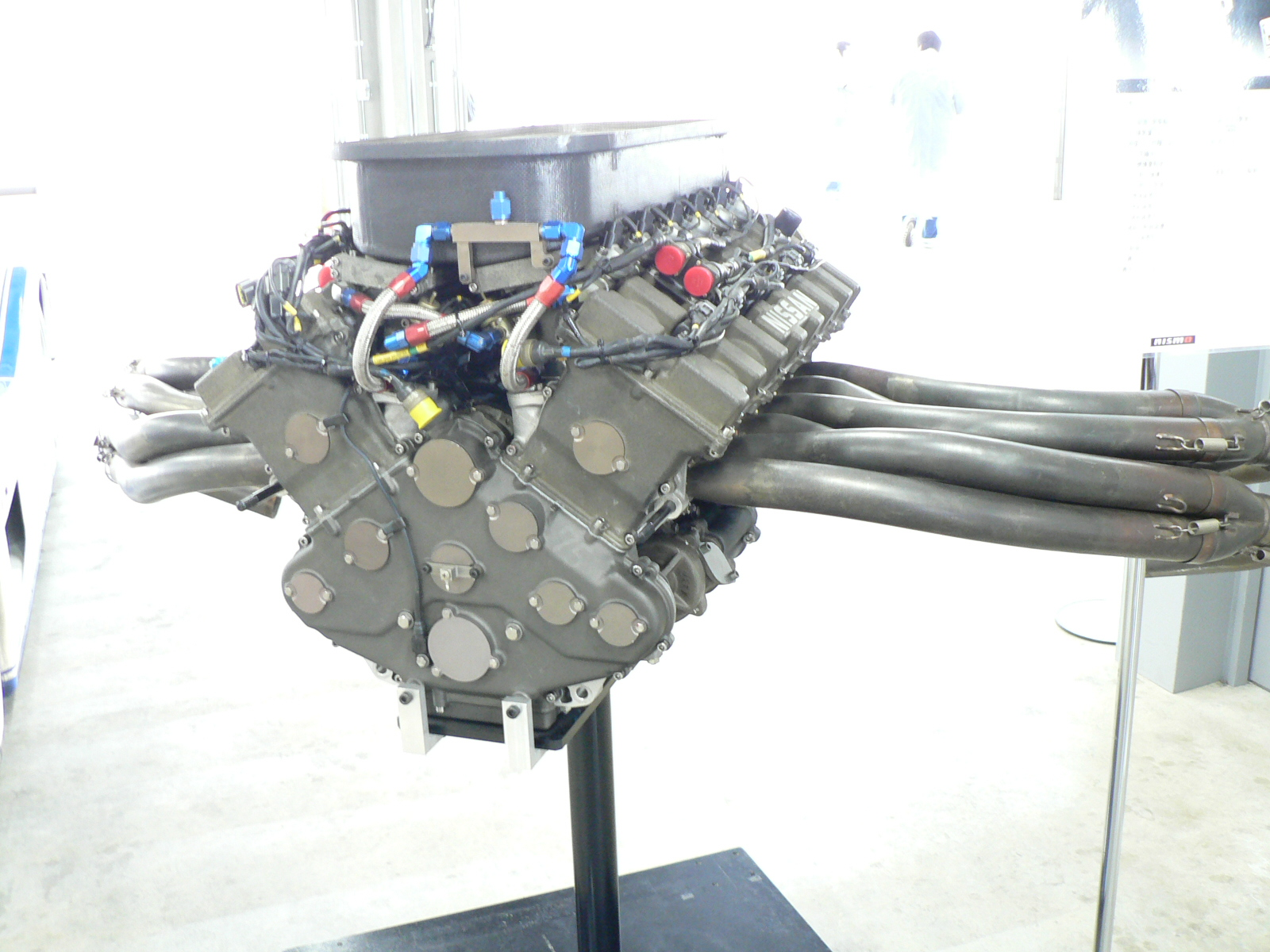

Overview
- Manufacturer: Nissan

Layout
- Configuration: 70° V12
- Displacement: 3.5 L (3,499 cc)
- Cylinder bore: 83 mm (3.27 in)
- Piston stroke: 54 mm (2.13 in)
- Valvetrain: DOHC 4 valves x cyl.

Combustion
- Fuel system: Fuel injection
- Fuel type: Gasoline
- Cooling system: Water-cooled

Output
- Power output: 630 hp (470 kW)
- Specific power: 180.1 hp (134.3 kW) per liter
- Torque output: 289 lb⋅ft (392 N⋅m)

The VRT35 is 3.5 L V12 piston engine from Nissan. It was developed for competition racing during the early 1990s by Nissan's motorsport division Nismo.

== History ==
Originally developed to be used in the Nissan P35 race car for Group C racing, the VRT35 would later see use in the 1992 All Japan Sports Prototype Championship. Required to be 3.5-litres by Group C rules, the engine had to not only be high-revving like a Formula One engine, but also have endurance capabilities. Nismo produced an engine at 3.5 L (3,499 cc) named the VRT35, with claims of 630 PS (463 kW) and capable of reaching nearly 12000 rpm. The VRT35 would be a V12, in contrast to Peugeot, Toyota, and Mazda's V10 units. Johnny O'Connell, a test driver for the Nissan P35 race car once said "Well it was about the most amazing sounding engine I have driven. It totally screamed.".

== Specifications of VRT35 ==
- Aspiration: Naturally aspirated
- Valvetrain: DOHC, 4 Valves per Cylinder
- Displacement: 3.5 L (3,499 cc)
- Bore x Stroke: 83 mm × 54 mm (3.27 in × 2.13 in)
- Power: 630 PS (463 kW) at 11,600 rpm
- Torque: 289 lb⋅ft (392 N⋅m) at 9,200 rpm

== See also ==
- List of Nissan engines
- Nissan P35
- Nissan VRH35 engine
- Nismo
- Nissan
