= Nissan Z engine =

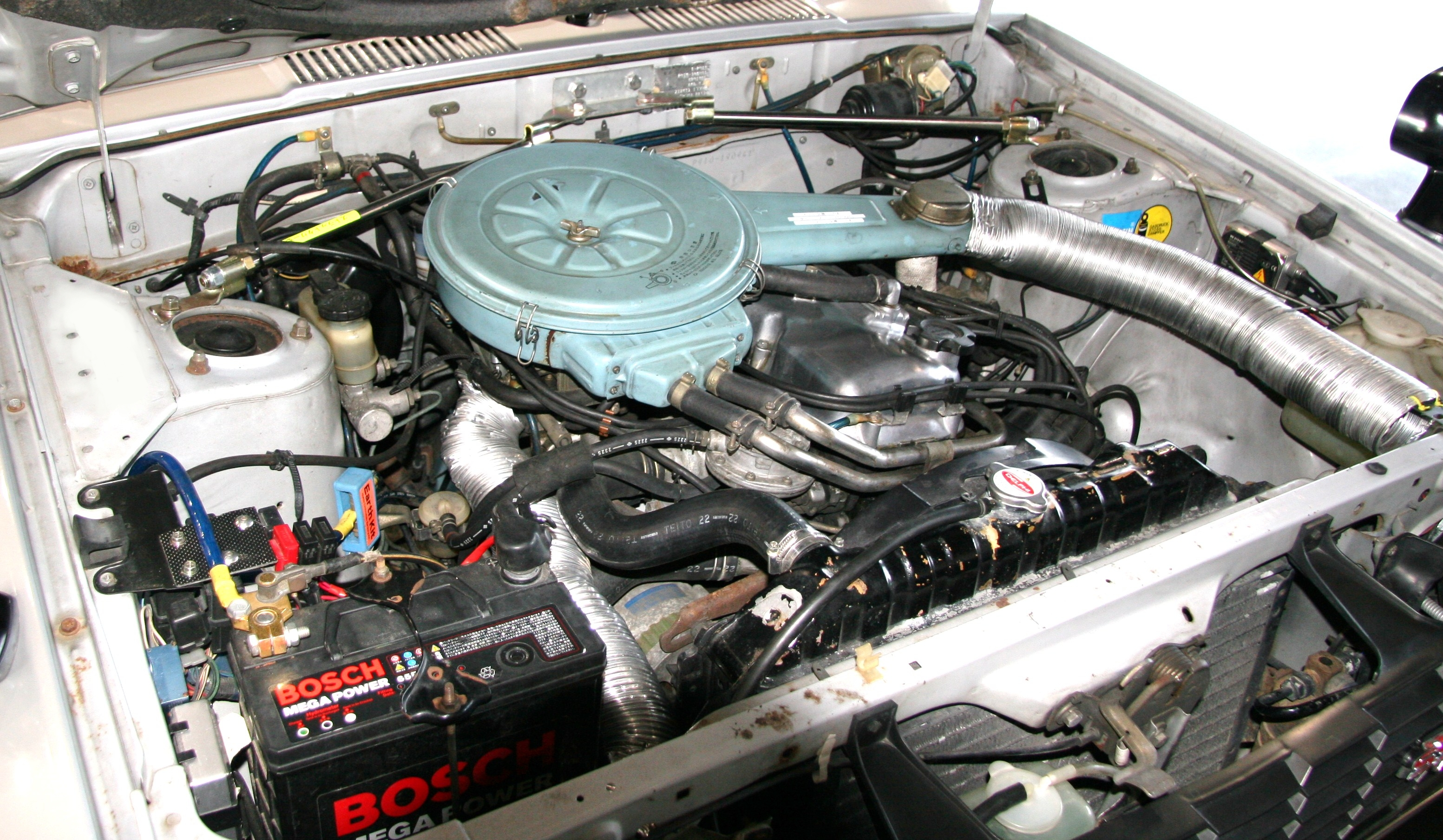
- Nissan Bluebird 910 SSS engine room

Overview
- Manufacturer: Nissan (Nissan Machinery)
- Production: 1978–1989

Layout
- Configuration: Inline-4
- Displacement: 1.6 L (1,595 cc); 1.8 L (1,770 cc); 2.0 L (1,952 cc); 2.2 L (2,188 cc); 2.4 L (2,389 cc)
- Cylinder bore: 83 mm (3.27 in); 85 mm (3.35 in); 87 mm (3.43 in); 89 mm (3.50 in)
- Piston stroke: 73.7 mm (2.90 in); 78 mm (3.07 in); 86 mm (3.39 in); 92 mm (3.62 in); 96 mm (3.78 in)
- Cylinder block material: Cast iron
- Cylinder head material: Aluminum
- Valvetrain: SOHC 2 valves x cyl.
- Compression ratio: 8.3:1, 8.8:1

Combustion
- Fuel system: Carburetor or Throttle-body FI
- Fuel type: Gasoline
- Cooling system: Water-cooled

Output
- Power output: 95–135 PS (70–99 kW; 94–133 hp)
- Torque output: 132–196 N⋅m; 98–145 lbf⋅ft (13.5–20 kg⋅m)

Chronology
- Predecessor: Nissan L engine (4-cylinder)
- Successor: Nissan CA engine Nissan KA engine Nissan NA engine

The Nissan Z engine is a series of automobile and light truck four-cylinder engines that was engineered by Nissan Machinery, manufactured by the Nissan Motor Company from 1979 through August 1989. All Z engines had 4 cylinders, a total of 8 valves and a single overhead camshaft (SOHC). Displacements ranged from 1.6 L to 2.4 L.The Z series' engine blocks were nearly identical to those of the earlier L Series with the exception of the Z24. While the Z16 and Z18 engines had a deck height similar to the earlier L13/L14/L16/L18 variants, the Z24 had a taller deck height to accommodate a longer stroke. The most notable difference between the Z-series engine and its predecessor was the introduction of a new crossflow cylinder head which reduced emissions by moving the intake ports to the right side of the engine opposite the exhaust ports. This change allows the exhaust port velocity to more effectively scavenge the cylinder and reduce reversion pulses to enhance induction. This change also limits maximum valve lift/lobe lift profiles rendering the cylinder head and valve train configuration undesirable for high-performance uses. The Z series evolved into the NA and KA engines which, along with the smaller CA series, replaced the Z series .

== Z16 ==
The Z16 made its first appearance in 1978 in the Nissan Violet A11. This version of the engine came with a single downdraft carburetor, and is sometimes coded Z16S. Later it was also available on low-end model 910 Bluebirds for the Japanese domestic market and some light Nissan commercial vehicles in a single-plug configuration.

Reference specifications (twin plug):

- Displacement : 1,595 cc (1.6 L)
- Bore × stroke : 83 mm × 73.7 mm (3.27 in × 2.90 in)
- Compression ratio : 8.8:1
- Maximum output (JIS gross) : 95 PS (70 kW; 94 hp) at 6,000 rpm
- Maximum torque (gross) : 13.5 kg⋅m (132 N⋅m; 98 lb⋅ft) at 3,600 rpm

Car models:

- 1982-1986 Datsun 720 (single plug specification)
- Nissan Navara (D21) (Japan name: Datsun truck / single plug specification)
- 1979 Nissan Bluebird (810)
- Nissan Bluebird (910)
- Nissan Atlas (F22) (single plug specification)
- Nissan Skyline (C210)
- Nissan Violet (A10)

The Z16E is an EFI version of the Z16S, fitted with Nissan's EGI system. Released at the same time as the Z16S, it was used on the Nissan Violet. It has almost the same internal structure as the less powerful Z16S.

Reference specifications:

- Maximum output (JIS gross): 105 PS (77 kW; 104 hp) at 6,000 rpm
- Maximum torque (JIS gross): 13.8 kg⋅m (135 N⋅m; 100 lb⋅ft) at 4,000 rpm
- Other numbers are equivalent to Z16S.

Car models:

- Nissan Violet (A11)

== Z18 ==
The Z18 debuted in 1977, making it the first model of the Z-type engine to be released. Displacing 1,770 cc (1.8 L) with a bore and stroke of 85 mm × 78 mm (3.35 in × 3.07 in), it is essentially an older L18 type series four-cylinder with a new cross-flow cylinder head and (typically) twin spark plugs. A 1980 twin-carburetor version produced 105 PS (77 kW; 104 hp) at 6,000 rpm (SAE). Export specification is 77 PS (57 kW; 76 hp) at 5,600 rpm (DIN/net) for the Datsun 180K (export name for C210 Skyline), 86 PS (63 kW; 85 hp) for the 910-series Bluebird, while the twin carburetor specifications 910 Bluebird SSS and Silvia for export produced 90–92 PS (66–68 kW; 89–91 hp) depending on year, market, and model.

The Z18 was also available in some of the commercial vehicle engine lineups; those models were of a single plug cylinder head design. This version was also built to run on LPG, mainly for taxi use. Called the Z18P such an engine produces 84 PS gross (62 kW; 83 hp) at 5600 rpm and 132 N⋅m (13.5 kg⋅m; 98 lb⋅ft) at 2800 rpm when installed in a Bluebird 910.

Reference specifications:

- Displacement: 1,770 cc (1.8 L)
- Compression ratio: 8.8:1
- Maximum output (gross): 105 PS (77 kW; 104 hp) at 6000 rpm
- Maximum torque (gross): 147 N⋅m (15 kg⋅m; 108 lb⋅ft) at 3600 rpm
- Above those of the twin plug specification engine

Car models:

- 811-Series Nissan Bluebird
- Nissan Bluebird (910) / Datsun 180B (PJ910)
- 1978.11-1980.11 Nissan Laurel (PC231) / Datsun 180L
- 1980.11-1982.09 Nissan Laurel (C31)
- JF30-Series Nissan Leopard 1800
- S110-Series Nissan Silvia / Nissan Gazelle
- Nissan Skyline (PC211) / Datsun 180K
- PJR30 type Nissan Skyline 1800
- RA11 type Nissan Violet / Auster / Stanza / Datsun 180J
- D720 type Datsun Truck (1982-1985 single plug specification)
- D21 type Datsun Truck (single plug specification)

== Z18E ==
The Z18E is a 1.8 L (1,770 cc) fuel-injected engine produced primarily for the Japanese market. Most specs were the same as those of the Z18, but maximum power increased to 115 PS (85 kW; 113 hp) (SAE) at 6,200 rpm in 1980 (Bluebird, Skyline).

Applications:

- Nissan Bluebird 910
- Nissan Skyline 1800TI (C210)
- Nissan Skyline 1800TI (R30)

== Z18ET ==
The Z18ET is a 1.8 L (1,770 cc) turbocharged and fuel-injected engine first introduced in the 1979 S110 Silvia/Gazelle. It was produced primarily for the Japanese market and produced 135 PS (99 kW; 133 hp).

Applications:

- 1979-1983 Nissan Silvia (S110)
- 1979-1986 Nissan Bluebird (910) - 135 PS (99 kW; 133 hp) at 6000 rpm, 20 kg⋅m (196 N⋅m; 145 lb⋅ft) at 3600 rpm

== Z20S ==
The Z20S (S denotes carbureted) is a 2.0 L (1,952 cc) engine with a bore and stroke of 85 mm × 86 mm (3.35 in × 3.39 in) that produced from 1979 through 1988. It replaced the L20B while using many of the same bottom-end components.

Applications:

- 1979-1981 Datsun 510 (HA10) - 88–92 hp (89–93 PS; 66–69 kW) SAE
- 1981 Datsun 720
- Nissan Cabstar (Europe, 90 PS or 66 kW or 89 hp DIN at 5000 rpm)
- 1980-1986 Nissan/Datsun Caravan/Urvan/Nissan Homy E23 - 105 PS (77 kW; 104 hp) at 5200 rpm, European versions have 87 PS (64 kW; 86 hp)
- 1986-1997 Nissan Caravan/Urvan/Homy E24
- 1985-1988 Nissan Vanette C22 88 PS (65 kW; 87 hp) at 5200 rpm
- 1979.10-1980.11 Nissan Laurel C230
- 1980.11-1984.10 Nissan Laurel C31 110 PS (81 kW; 108 hp) at 5600 rpm
- 1979-1984 Datsun/Nissan Bluebird (910)

In the US, the Z20S was only available in the 1980-81 510/A10 and 1984 720 pickup with the MPG option.

Nissan Caravans or Homys with this engine could reach a maximum speed of 160 km/h (99 mph). They were noted for being faster than Toyota's Hiace competitor thanks to the Z20S engine's extra power. There was also a dual-fuel version capable of running on LPG, called the Z20D.

== Z20E ==
The Z20E is a fuel-injected version of the Z20S engine produced from 1979 through July 1984. It had longer connecting rods and shorter compression-height pistons than the 1980-81 Z20S. It produces 100 PS (74 kW; 99 hp). The Z20E was not available in the 720 pickup, which only used carbureted versions. The Z20 engine was not available in US-spec 720 pickups nor California-spec D21 pickups.

Applications:

- 1979-1981 Datsun /Nissan 200SX
- 1985-1988 Nissan Pickup D21
- 1979-1984 Datsun/Nissan Bluebird 910

== Z22S ==
The Z22S (carb only) was 2.2 L (2,188 cc) produced from 1980 through early 1983. Bore and stroke are 87 mm × 92 mm (3.43 in × 3.62 in); respectively. It produces 86 hp (64 kW; 87 PS) SAE as fitted to the US-market Datsun 720. It was also fitted to certain versions of the Civilian bus line. In the Civilian, maximum power is 105 PS JIS gross (77 kW) at 5,000 rpm, with maximum torque of 18.1 kg⋅m (178 N⋅m; 131 lb⋅ft) at 2,800 rpm.

Applications:

- 1981–1982 Datsun 720
- 1982–1988 Nissan Civilian (W40)

== Z22E ==
The Z22E is a fuel-injected version of the Z22 engine produced from 1981 through 1983, mainly for North America. This engine has longer connecting rods and shorter compression-height pistons than the carbureted Z22S engine.

Applications:

- 1981-1983 Datsun 200SX (103 hp or 77 kW or 104 PS SAE at 5200 rpm)

== Z24 ==
The Z24 was 2.4 L (2,389 cc) produced from 1983 through August 1989. A throttle-body fuel injection version (Z24i) was also produced, beginning in April 1985.

Applications:

- Nissan Terrano
- 1983.5-1986 Nissan/Datsun 720
- 1986 Nissan/Datsun 720 (Z24i) (ST models only)
- 1986-1989 Nissan Hardbody Truck (Z24i)
- 1986-1989 Nissan Pathfinder (E model only)
- 1987-1990 Nissan Vanette/Nomad

various Forklift applications Z24 versions in gas and LPG

Note: All USDM gasoline Z20, Z22 and Z24 engines were known as NAPS-Z (NAPZ or NAPS-Z Nissan Anti-Pollution System), NAPZ motors had dual spark-plugs (two per cylinder) except the pre-82 versions and latest versions of the Z24i as fitted to the Pathfinder. All NAPZ engines sold in California reportedly had dual plug heads regardless of the year.

The fuel-injected version referenced above was denoted as the Z24i (Throttle Body Fuel Injection) and was first available in the Nissan Model 720 ST pickup during the 1985 model year and was replaced in 1990 by the KA24E engine and they share the same bellhousing pattern. Beside the fuel-injection, a significant change for the Z24i was the addition of an optical crank angle sensor in the distributor rather than a vacuum advance and ignition module. This allowed the JECS throttle-body injection system to identify the top dead center (TDC) of cylinder number one.

Engine Displacement: 2,389 cc (2.4 L) Bore x Stroke: 89 mm × 96 mm (3.50 in × 3.78 in) Compression Ratio: 8.3:1

Power Ratings:

- Z24

Years - 1984-1986 Power - 103 hp (77 kW; 104 PS) at 4800 rpm Torque - 134 lb⋅ft (182 N⋅m; 19 kg⋅m) at 2800 rpm

- Z24i

Years - 1986-1989 Power - 106 hp (79 kW; 107 PS) at 4800 rpm Torque - 137 lb⋅ft (186 N⋅m; 19 kg⋅m) at 2400 rpm

== See also ==
- List of Nissan engines
