= Nissan P35 =

Nissan P35/NP35
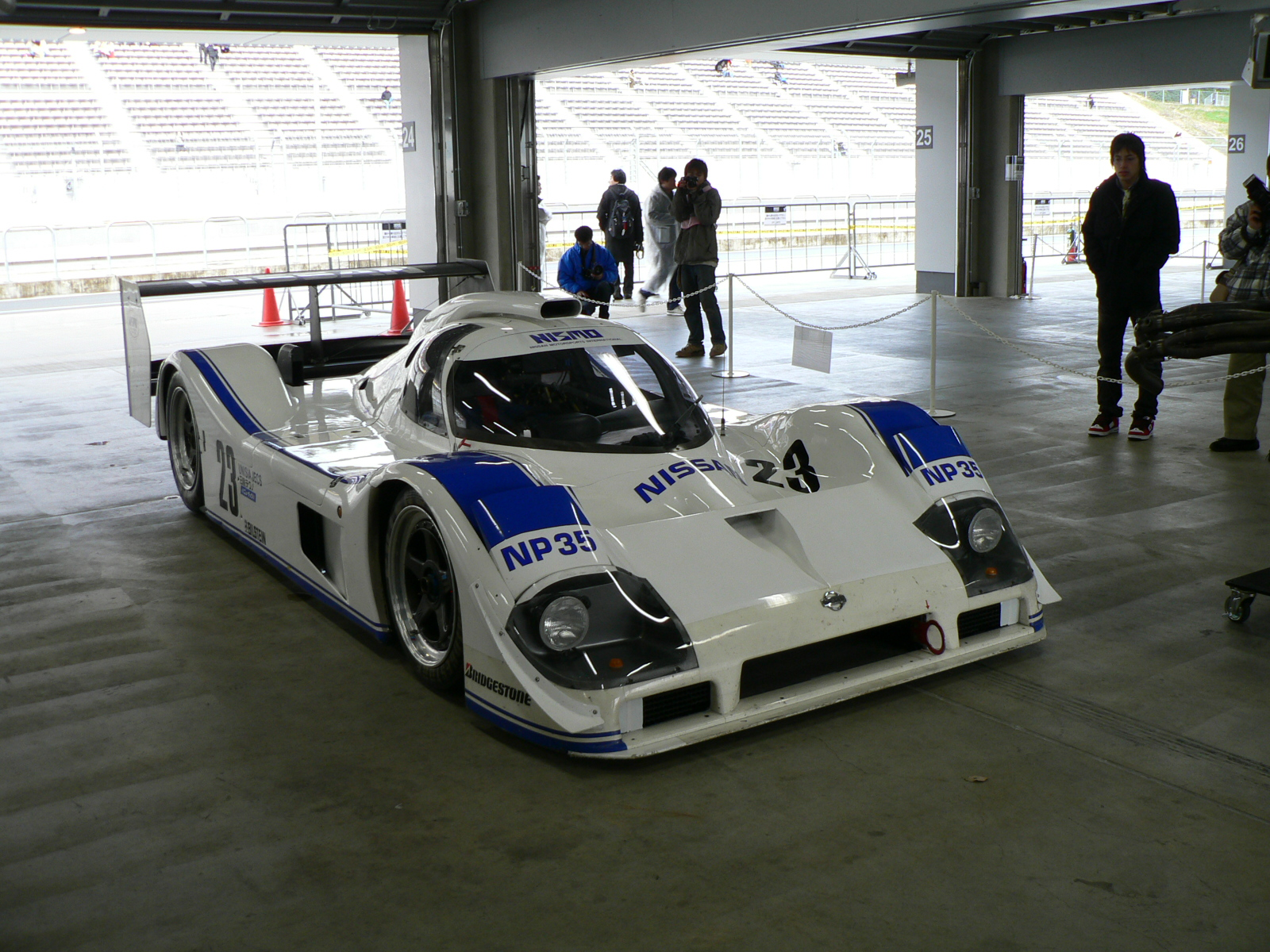

Overview
- Manufacturer: Nissan
- Production: 1992
- Designer: Trevor Harris (chassis design); Yoshi Suzuka (aerodynamicist)

Body and chassis
- Class: Group C race car
- Layout: MR layout

Powertrain
- Engine: VRT35 (3499cc), 70 degree V-12
- Transmission: 6-speed sequential

The Nissan P35 was a planned Group C car built by Nissan Motors for competition in the World Sportscar Championship. Developed by Nissan Performance Technology Inc. (NPTI), which had formerly raced under the name Electramotive in the United States, the cars were intended to be completed by the middle of 1992, with competition starting in 1993. However economic troubles for Nissan led to the cancellation of the project soon after testing of the first cars had begun, meaning that the P35s never raced.

During the development of the P35, Nissan's own motorsports division, Nismo, began work on a modified P35 design that would be adapted to the All Japan Sports Prototype Championship. This car, known as the NP35, would be allowed to race only once before it too was cancelled. These would be the final prototypes built by Nissan until 1997.

== Development ==
At the end of a strong year in the 1990 World Sportscar Championship season for Nissan's R90CKs, it was decided that the company would leave the championship to instead concentrate on the R90CPs in the All Japan Sports Prototype Championship (JSPC) and GTP ZX-Turbos in the IMSA GT Championship in North America. Regulation changes in the World Sportscar Championship would have required Nissan to abandon their turbocharged engines in place of newer, advanced naturally aspirated units, as well as design all new cars to handle them.

Nissan reversed their plans in 1991, partially because JSPC was beginning to allow the newer Group C cars that could outpace Nissan's older cars. Nissan turned to Nissan Performance Technology Inc. (NPTI), the company's North American motorsports arm which had run their IMSA GT Championship program. The company was tasked with developing a new car while Nissan Motorsport (Nismo) in Japan would develop an all-new engine to fit the regulations.

Designed by Yoshi Suzuka and Trevor Harris, the P35 bore little resemblance to NPTI's GTP cars given the very different regulations as well as differing airflow requirements that needed to be taken into account. The water radiator was placed in the nose with inlets for brake cooling situated there as well, the engine inlet was placed above the cockpit. The side ducts located in the horizontal face of the side pods took air to the oil coolers (and also had a unique boundary layer suction feature). A low rear wing was also used, although a dual rear wing was briefly tested. The chassis of the P35 was intended to be built from carbon fibre, yet the initial test chassis were built from a hybrid of aluminium and carbon to save time, due to NPTI's lack of experience with building carbon chassis.

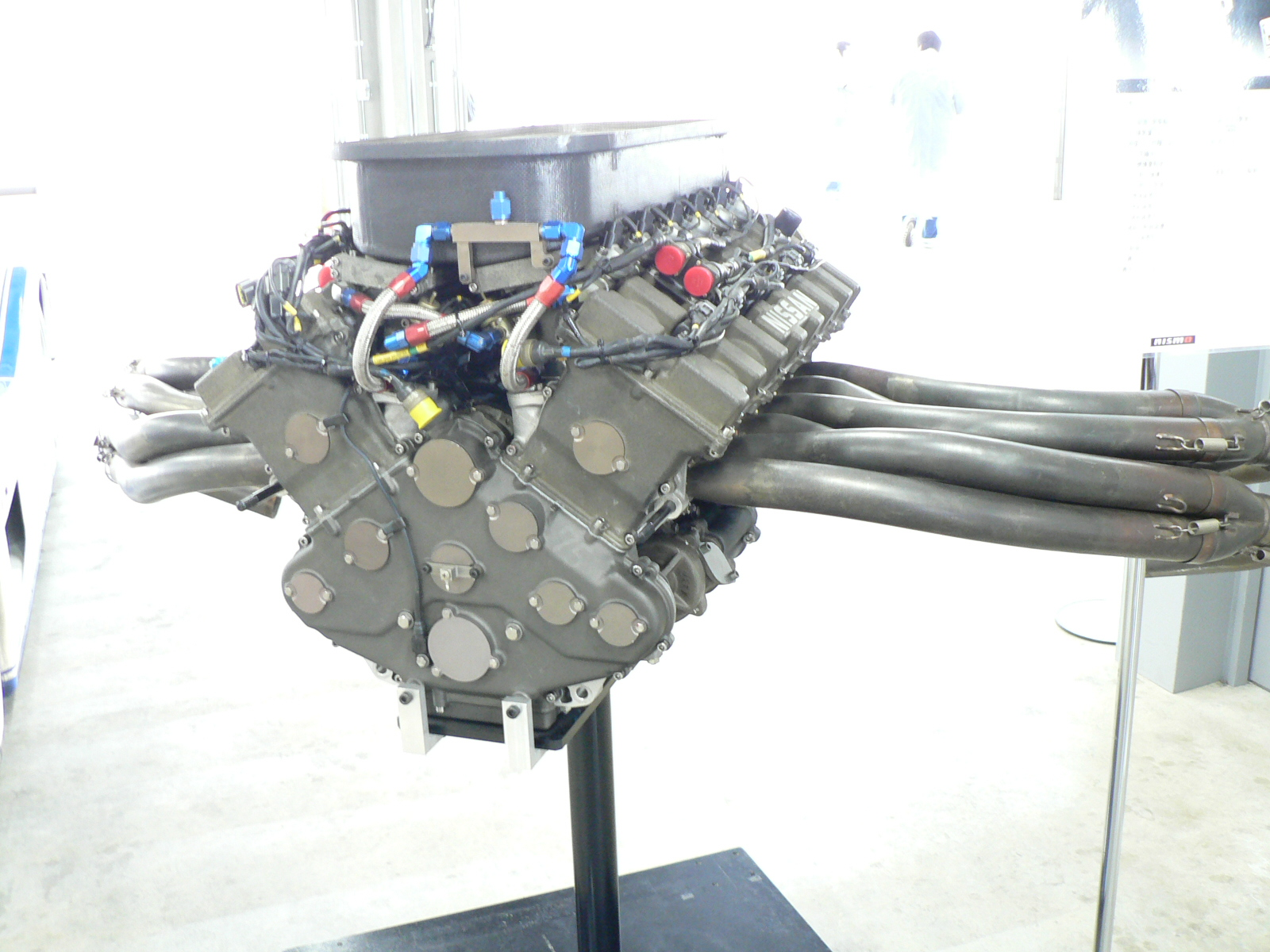
VRT35 engine

For an engine, Nismo would develop an entirely new unit. Required to be 3.5 litres by Group C rules, the engine had to not only be high-revving like a Formula One engine, but also have endurance capabilities. Nismo produced an engine at 3499 cc named the VRT35, with claims of 630 horsepower (470 kW) and capable of reaching nearly 12000 rpm. The VRT35 would be a V12, in comparison to Peugeot, Toyota, and Mazda's V10 units.

Following the cancellation of the P35 project in 1992, the car was briefly considered as a possible replacement for the NPT-90 in the IMSA GTP Championship, replacing the VRT35 V12 with the 3.0L turbocharged VG30 V6 that had previously been used. Wind tunnel tests were carried out on what was termed the 93GTP. However, Nissan was looking elsewhere and decided to pursue Indy Car racing. This lasted only briefly (though Indy Car concepts were beginning to be developed in the wind tunnel) and the realities of the widening recession hit home. This eventually led to the closing of NPTI in 1993.

In total, three P35 chassis were built in total for testing purposes.

=== NP35 ===
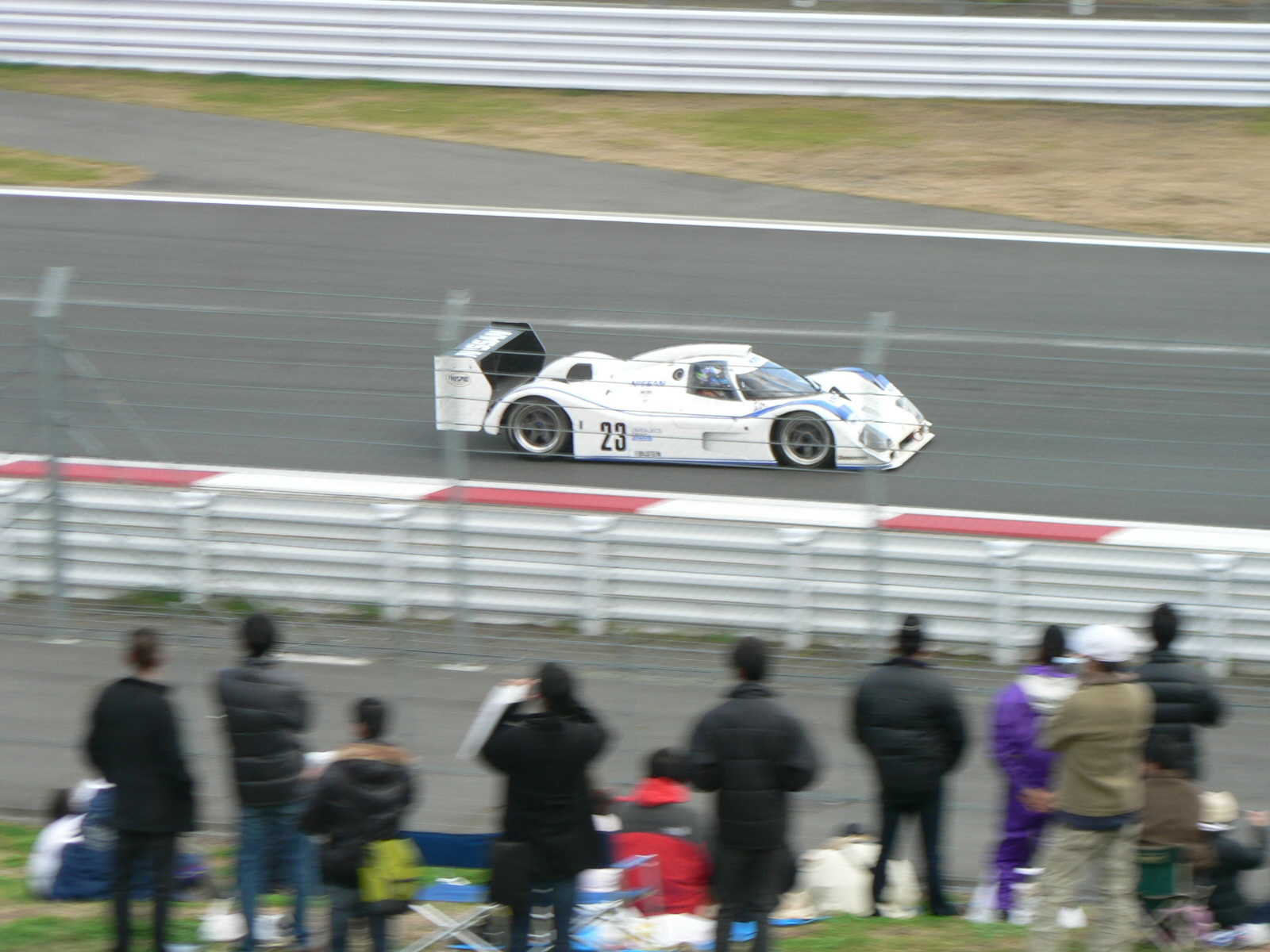
Nismo NP35

While NPTI developed the P35, Nismo decided that although the car would be legal for competition in the All Japan Sports Prototype Championship, it was not as well suited to Japan's shorter race circuits. Nismo therefore decided that they would develop their own version of the P35 with an increased downforce setup as well as some other mechanical changes.

Nismo used molds originally used for the creation of the P35 to create their own car, known as the NP35. Due to Nismo's access to a carbon fibre facility, the chassis of the lone NP35 was constructed entirely of carbon fiber instead of the hybrid used by NPTI. The VRT35 V12 was also modified with more power because JSPC races were not as long and endurance was not as important.

Only one NP35 would be built and raced before Nissan cancelled the project.

=== X-250 ===
In 1992, following the closing of NPTI as well as the cancellation of the World Sportscar Championship, All Japan Sports Prototype Championship, as well as the GTP class in the IMSA GT Championship, a group of former NPTI employees, including chief mechanic John Christie, took it upon themselves to build a new car for IMSA's WSC class of open-cockpit Le Mans prototypes. Using one of the former P35 test cars, chassis #1, the team removed the roof and added roll hoops and a new cockpit surround for driver protection. The VRT35 engines were replaced with a Ferrari 3.4-liter V8. The team renamed the car "X-250" in homage of the 250 employees laid off with NPTI's demise.

== Racing history ==
The P35 was tested various times during 1991, with Bob Earl doing most of the driving. Tests included runs at Mid-Ohio Sports Car Course and on the road course at Daytona International Speedway. However the P35 never competed in any races, and one copy was moved to Japan to be stored in Nissan's Zama, Kanagawa facility.

The NP35 on the other hand would actually race, although only once. The final race of the 1992 JSPC season (and what would become the final JSPC race before the series was dissolved) was at Mine Circuit, and Nismo entered their lone NP35. Competing in their class against the Toyota TS010 and Mazda MXR-01, the NP35 would be the slowest car in qualifying, five seconds behind the pole winning Nissan R92CP. The race itself would see many mechanical problems for the car, although it would manage to finish the race. Of the finishers, it was ranked last and 25 laps behind the winning TS010. Following this race, the NP35 would not race again, moving into storage alongside the P35. Nissan occasionally brings it to exhibition events, namely its own annual Nismo Festival.

The X-250, built by John Christie and some former members of the defunct P35 program, from P35 Chassis number 1, also only ran one race, the 1997 12 Hours of Sebring powered by a Ferrari 348 engine, built by Robin Smith, a fellow countryman of Mr. Christie. There, the car suffered electronics problems after only 21 laps and was listed as the first car out of the event. The X-250 never raced competitively again but is raced in historic racing.

Chassis number 2 of the Nissan P35 is now housed in Coventry University's Motorsport Engineering Workshop. The car is used as a training vehicle for students on the university's renowned BEng Motorsports Engineering Degree.
