= Nissan NA engine =

NA engine
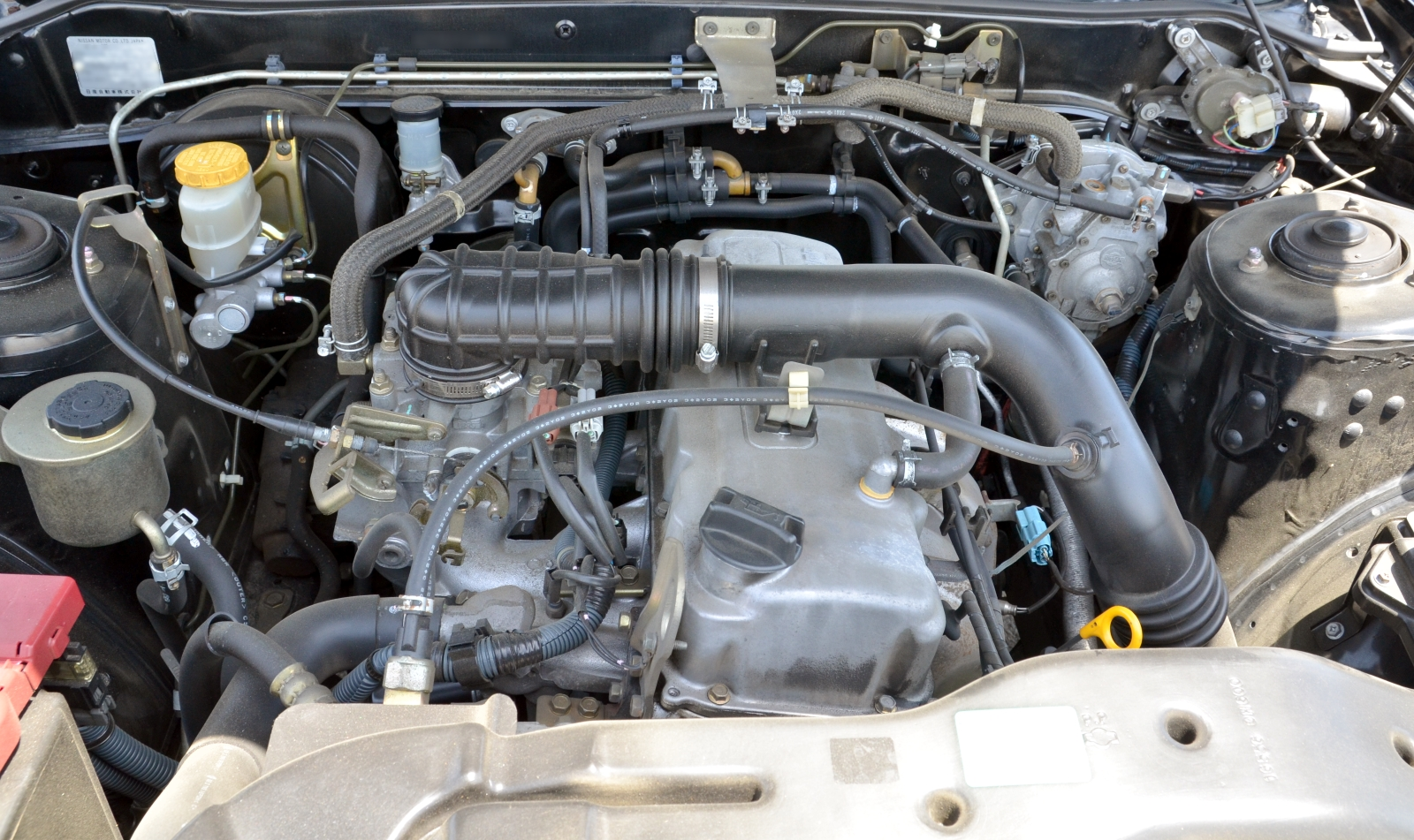
- NA20P engine

Overview
- Manufacturer: Nissan Machinery

Layout
- Configuration: Naturally aspirated Straight-4
- Displacement: 1.6–2.0 L (1,627–1,998 cc)
- Cylinder bore: 81.5 mm (3.21 in); 86 mm (3.39 in)
- Piston stroke: 78 mm (3.07 in); 86 mm (3.39 in)
- Valvetrain: SOHC

Combustion
- Fuel type: Gasoline; Liquefied petroleum gas (in commercial vehicles)
- Cooling system: Water-cooled

Output
- Power output: 76–100 PS (56–74 kW)
- Torque output: 12.8–17 kg⋅m (126–167 N⋅m; 93–123 lb⋅ft)

Chronology
- Predecessor: Z series

The Nissan NA family of straight-four engines is a series of engines manufactured by Nissan (Nissan Machinery). It is the replacement of the Z series, on which its design is based, and is mostly used in commercial vehicles due to its use of Liquefied petroleum gas for fuel on engines with a "P" suffix code. It is entirely unrelated to the 1950s NAK engine.

== NA16S ==
- Engine type: 1.6 L (1,627 cc), 81.5 mm × 78 mm (3.21 in × 3.07 in) bore and stroke, SOHC
- Output: 76 PS (56 kW) at 5,000 rpm
- Torque: 12.8 kg⋅m (126 N⋅m; 93 lb⋅ft) at 3,200 rpm

=== Applications ===
- 1989–1995 Datsun Truck D21 73 PS (54 kW)
- 1990–1995 Nissan Atlas F22 - F23

== NA20P ==
- Engine type: 2.0 L (1,998 cc), 86 mm × 86 mm (3.39 in × 3.39 in) bore and stroke, SOHC, carburetted
- Output: 82 PS (60 kW) at 4,600 rpm
- Torque: 16.2 kg⋅m (159 N⋅m; 117 lb⋅ft) at 2,400 rpm

In 1998 the NA20P was updated, with redesigned combustion chambers which increased power and torque while lowering fuel consumption. A new catalyst reduced emissions, making it the first LPG-engined passenger car to be designated a low-pollution vehicle in several Japanese cities and prefectures.

- Output: 85 PS (63 kW) at 4,600 rpm
- Torque: 17 kg⋅m (167 N⋅m; 123 lb⋅ft) at 2,400 rpm

=== Applications ===
- 1991–2010 Nissan Cedric Y31
- 1993–2009 Nissan Crew K30
- 1991–1999 Nissan Gloria Y31

== NA20PE ==
This fuel injected, LPG-powered variant was introduced in September 2010 and met new, stricter emissions regulations.

- Engine type: 2.0 L (1,998 cc), 86 mm × 86 mm (3.39 in × 3.39 in) bore and stroke, SOHC, multi-point fuel injection
- Output: 85 PS (63 kW) at 4,400 rpm
- Torque: 17.3 kg⋅m (170 N⋅m; 125 lb⋅ft) at 2,400 rpm

=== Applications ===
- 2010–2014 Nissan Cedric Y31

== NA20S ==
- Engine type: 2.0 L (1,998 cc), 86 mm × 86 mm (3.39 in × 3.39 in) bore and stroke, SOHC
- Typical output: 100 PS (74 kW) at 5,000 rpm
- Torque: 17 kg⋅m (167 N⋅m; 123 lb⋅ft) at 3,000 rpm

=== Applications ===
- 1989-1999 Datsun Truck D21, 91 PS (67 kW) at 5,000 rpm
- 1990–1999 Nissan Atlas F22 - F23
- 1990–1999 Nissan Atlas H40
- 1990–1999 Nissan Homy / Nissan Caravan E24
