= Nissan BD engine =

BD engine

Overview
- Manufacturer: Nissan Diesel

Layout
- Configuration: Naturally aspirated Straight-4
- Displacement: 2.5–3.0 L (2,493–2,953 cc)

Combustion
- Fuel system: Direct injection
- Fuel type: Diesel
- Cooling system: Water-cooled

Output
- Power output: 82–100 PS (60–74 kW; 81–99 bhp)
- Torque output: 22 kg⋅m (220 N⋅m; 160 lb⋅ft)

The BD is an automotive diesel engine produced by Nissan Diesel. BD is specified as a 4-cylinder, direct fuel injection, water-cooled naturally aspirated engine.

== BD25 ==
- 2.5 L (2,493 cc)
- 82 PS (60 kW; 81 bhp) @ 4,300 rpm
- It is applied to the following vehicles
  - Nissan D21 Pickup, Nissan Atlas
  - In the Philippines BD25 Diesel engines are mounted on pickup trucks, namely the Ultra Power, and the Eagle series.

== BD30 ==
- 3.0 L (2,953 cc)
- 100 PS (74 kW; 99 bhp) @ 3,800 rpm, 22 kg⋅m (216 N⋅m; 159 lb⋅ft) @ 2,000 rpm
- It is applied to the following vehicles
  - Nissan Atlas series H40 and H41 (1995 only)
  - BMC Levend (1990-2009)
  - Nissan Motors and BMC (Turkey) for light trucks.

== BD30TI ==
- 78 kW (105 hp) or 88 kW (118 hp)
- It is applied to the following vehicles
  - 1997-2007 Nissan Cabstar F23

== BD30TI (110 PS) ==
- 80 kW (110 hp) at 3600 rpm and 260 newton-metres (190 lbf⋅ft) at 2000 rpm
- It is applied to the following vehicles
  - 1997-2000 Nissan ECO-T Atleon (Spain)
- 81 kW (109 hp) at 3500 rpm and 262 newton-metres (193 lbf⋅ft) at 2100 rpm
- It is applied to the following vehicles
  - 2000-2006 Nissan Atleon (Spain)

== See also ==
- List of Nissan engines
