= Nissan VE engine =

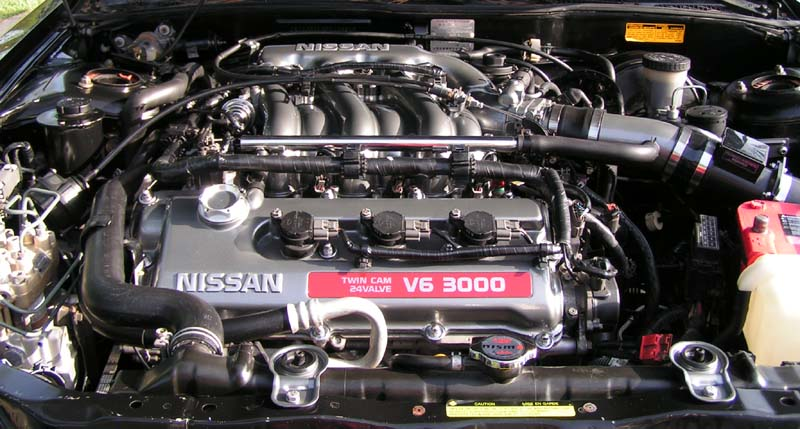
- Nissan VE30DE Engine

Overview
- Manufacturer: Nissan Motors
- Production: 1992–1994

Layout
- Configuration: 60° V6
- Displacement: 3.0 L (2,960 cc)
- Cylinder block material: Cast iron
- Cylinder head material: Aluminum
- Valvetrain: DOHC 4 valves x cyl. w/VVT

RPM range
- Max. engine speed: 6600

Output
- Power output: 190 hp (142 kW; 193 PS) at 5600 rpm
- Specific power: 64.2 hp (47.9 kW; 65.1 PS) per litre
- Torque output: 190 lb⋅ft (258 N⋅m) at 4000 rpm

Chronology
- Successor: Nissan VQ engine

The VE engine is a 3.0 L (2,960 cc) piston V6 engine from Nissan. It is based on the Nissan VG engine and was only used for the 1992, 1993, and 1994 model years. This engine has an iron block, aluminum cylinder heads with 4 valves per cylinder and dual overhead camshafts, variable valve timing on the intake camshafts, coil-on-plug ignition, and an available variable intake manifold (5-speed only). Additionally, the engine has a 10.0:1 compression ratio, a cylinder bore of 87.0 mm, and a piston stroke of 83.0 mm.

The most significant difference between the VE30DE and the VG30DE engine are the heads. The low under-hood clearance on the 1992–1994 J30 Nissan Maxima demanded a special head to be developed with 30°, rather than 46°, between the valves. Lack of space also demanded a redesigned camshaft drive system, so a special chain drive was developed. The camshafts are driven by a single primary and two secondary chains. The engine is otherwise similar to the VG30DE.

== VE30DE ==
The 3.0 L (2,960 cc) VE30DE produces 190 hp (142 kW; 193 PS) at 5600 rpm and 190 lb⋅ft (258 N⋅m) at 4000 rpm. This engine redlines at 6600 rpm. It was built from July, 1991 through March, 1994.

It is used in the following vehicle:

- 1992-1994 Nissan Maxima SE

== See also ==
- List of Nissan engines
