= Nissan UD engine =

Diesel Engines Produced by Nissan for Heavy Vehicles

The Nissan UD series of diesel engines were produced by Nissan in a range of configurations from three to twelve cylinders, all sharing the same internal dimensions. The engines were mainly used in heavy applications, such as buses and trucks produced from 1990 through 1998.

== Specification ==
All engines retain the same bore and stroke ratio - 110 mm x 130 mm.

=== UD-3 - 3706 cc - straight-3 diesel engine ===
Applications:

- Nissan Bus U690/UG680/UR690/NUR690
- Nissan Truck U680/DUG680/TU680/U681

=== UD-4 - 4941 cc - straight-4 diesel engine ===
Applications:

- Nissan Bus R80/RX102/4R82/4RA82/4RA104
- Nissan Truck T80/T80S/T80SD/TC8

=== UD-5 - 6177 cc - straight-5 diesel engine ===
Applications:

- Nissan Bus 5R104/5RA104
- Nissan Truck 5TWDC10

=== UD-6 - 7413 cc - straight-6 diesel engine ===
Applications:

- Nissan Bus 6R110/6RA110
- Nissan Truck 6TW1Z/6TW1ZS/6TW12SD

=== UD-V8 - 9883 cc - V8 diesel engine ===
Applications:

- Nissan Bus U8RA110

=== UD-V12 - 14825 cc - V12 diesel engine ===
Applications:

- Nissan Dump Truck WD38

== Marine applications ==
Nowadays, these engines find applications in boats as an alternative to Cummins diesels.
