= Nissan P engine =

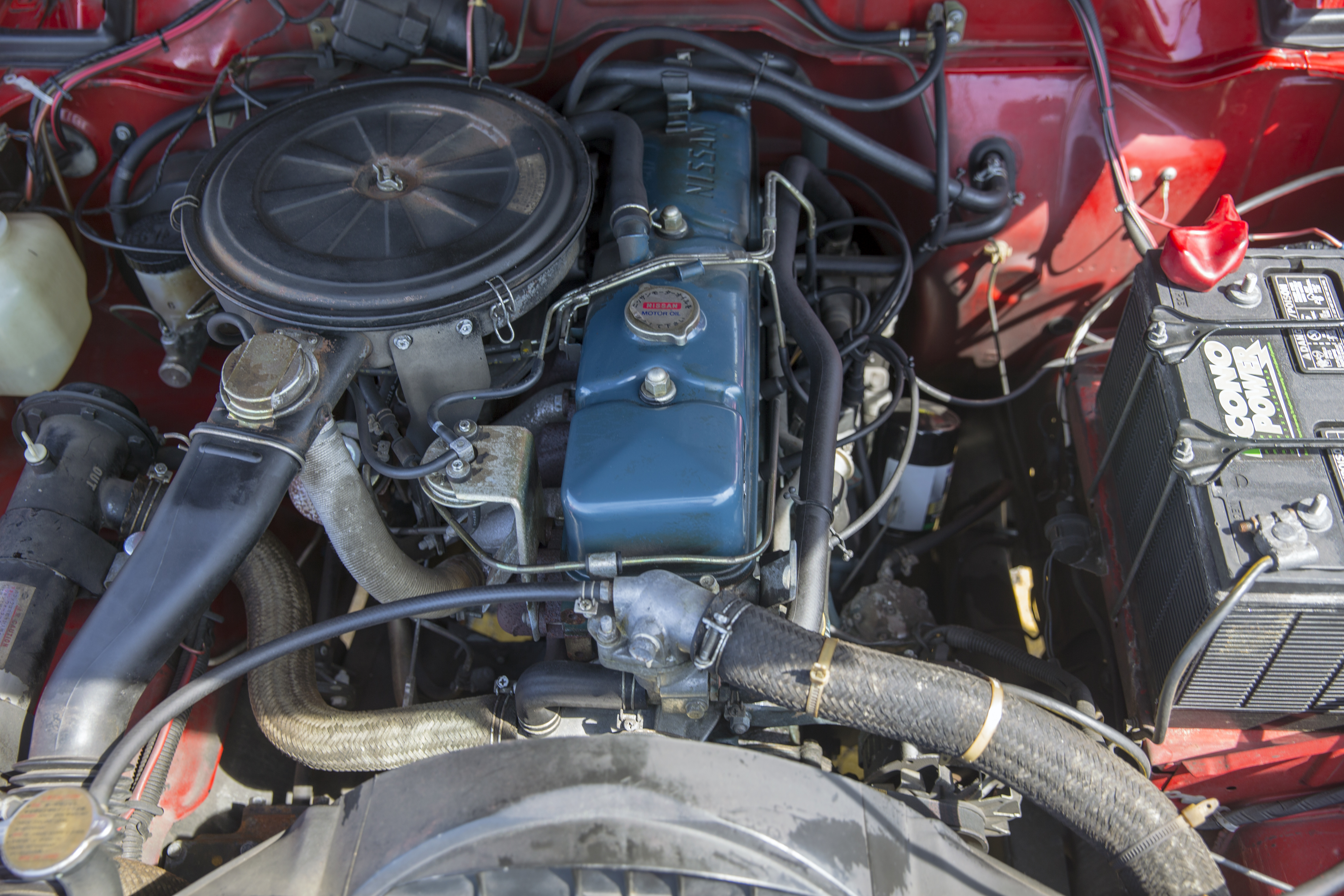

Overview
- Manufacturer: Nissan Motors
- Production: 1959-2003

Layout
- Configuration: Inline-6
- Displacement: 3.7 L (3,670 cc) (NAK/NB); 4.0 L (3,956 cc) (NC/P40)
- Cylinder bore: 82.5 mm (3.25 in) (NAK/NB); 85.7 mm (3.37 in) (NC/P40)
- Piston stroke: 114.3 mm (4.50 in)
- Valvetrain: OHV

Combustion
- Fuel system: Carburetor
- Cooling system: Water cooled

Output
- Power output: 92 kW (125 PS; 123 hp); 99 kW (135 PS; 133 hp); 107 kW (145 PS; 143 hp) (after 1965)

Chronology
- Predecessor: Nissan NC engine
- Successor: Nissan TB engine

The Nissan P engine is a large overhead valve, inline-six engine manufactured by Nissan from 1959 to 2003 and used in light-duty trucks by Nissan, as well as in the Nissan Patrol. It replaced Nissan's older sidevalve engines with which it shared its dimensions. This series of engines were based on the pre-war Type A engine, which was a license built Graham-Paige design.

== NAK ==
Introduced in 1950, the NAK is a 3.7 L (3,670 cc) petrol inline-six engine which produces 75 hp (56 kW; 76 PS). This was directly derived from Nissan's pre-war A engine, a license-built Graham-Paige unit.

Applications:

- Nissan 290 Bus
- 1950 Nissan Patrol 4W70
- 1951 Nissan Patrol 4W60
- 1952-1953 Nissan 380
- 1952-1953 Nissan 390 Bus

== NB ==
Introduced in 1953, the NB is a 3.7 L (3,670 cc) petrol inline-six engine which produces 95 hp (71 kW; 96 PS).

Applications:

- 1953-1954 Nissan 480
- 1953-1954 Nissan 490 Bus
- 1955 Nissan Patrol 4W61

== NC ==
Introduced in 1955, this is a 4.0 L (3,956 cc), sidevalve petrol inline-six which produces 105 PS (77 kW; 104 hp) at 3,400 rpm. Bore and stroke are 85.7 mm × 114.3 mm (3.37 in × 4.50 in). It was used in various buses and trucks as well as in early Nissan Patrols.

Applications:

- 1955-1959 Nissan 482 Truck
- 1955 Nissan 492 Bus
- 1955-1957 Nissan 580 Truck
- 1958-1959 Nissan 582 Truck
- 1955-1957 Nissan 590 Bus
- 1958-1959 Nissan 592 Bus
- 1955-1959 Nissan Carrier 4W72
- 1956-1959 Nissan Cabstar E590
- 1956-1959 Nissan Patrol 4W65

== P ==
The P is a gasoline-powered, overhead valve 4.0 L (3,956 cc) inline-six with 125 PS (92 kW; 123 hp) at 3,400 rpm initially. Bore and stroke are 85.7 mm × 114.3 mm (3.37 in × 4.50 in). Later with 135 PS (99 kW; 133 hp), further modifications in 1965 increased the power to 145 PS (107 kW; 143 hp). Later variants were called P40, reflecting the engine displacement in liters (4.0). A variant especially for fire-fighting duties, with a stronger alternator, an engine block heater, and various other improvements, was called the PF engine.

Applications:

- Nissan Cabstar E690
- 1959-1960 Nissan Patrol 4W66
- 1959-1968 Nissan Carrier 4W73
- 1959-1968 Nissan 680 Truck
- 1960-1968 Nissan 690 Bus
- 1960-1980 Nissan Patrol 60 series
- 1963-1968 Nissan FR40 fire engine
- 1968-1969 Nissan 681 Truck
- 1968-1969 Nissan 691 Bus
- 1970- Nissan G780
- 1980-2003 Nissan Patrol 160 series
- 1986-1993 Nissan Patrol 260 series
