= Nissan EM motor =

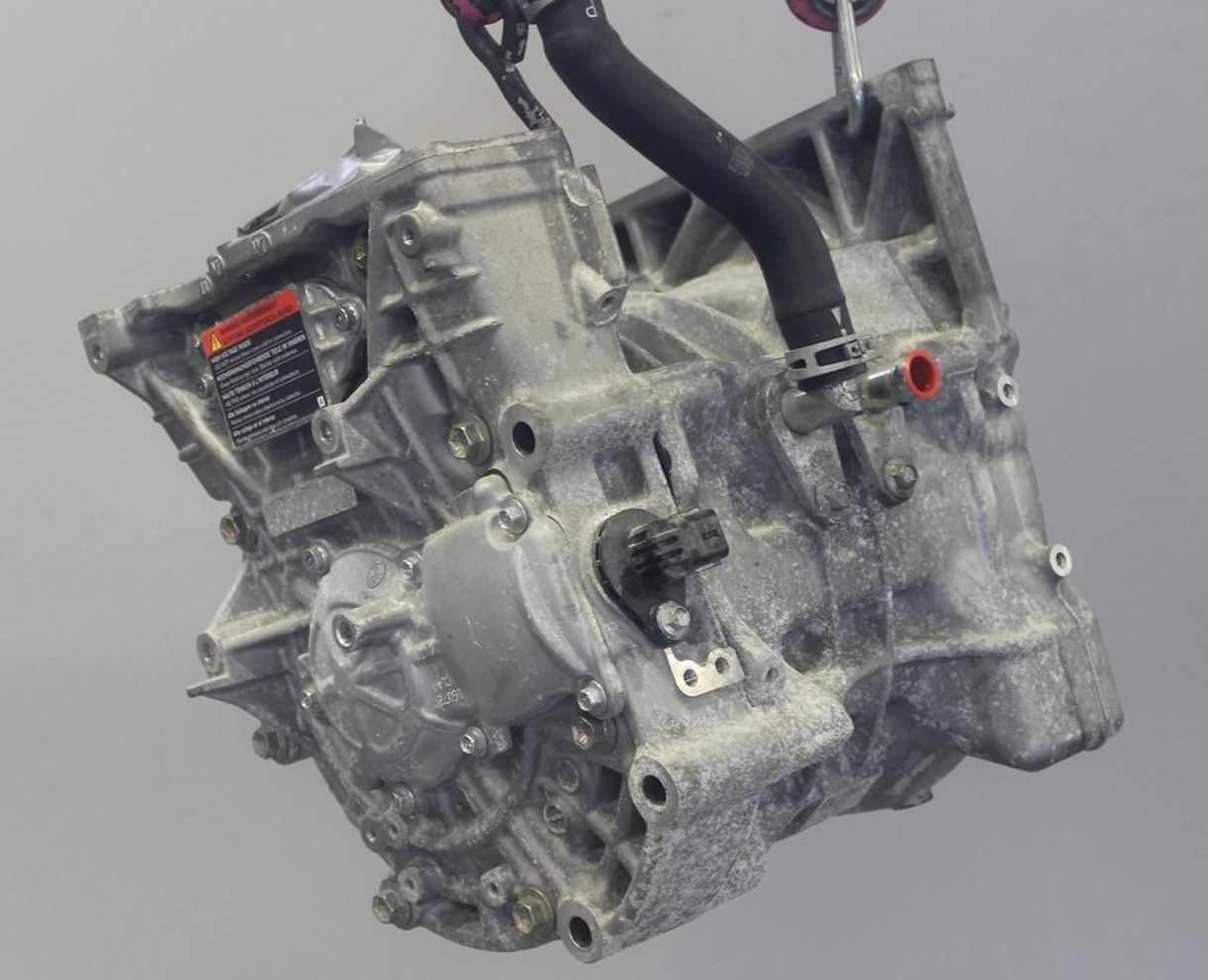

Overview
- Manufacturer: Nissan
- Production: 2010-Present

Layout
- Configuration: Water-cooled, 3-phase AC synchronous
- Cylinder block material: Aluminium

RPM range
- Max. engine speed: 10,390 - 11,330 rpm (Depends on model-year)

Output
- Power output: From 80 kW (107 hp) to 160 kW (215 hp)
- Torque output: From 250 N⋅m (184 lb⋅ft) to 340 N⋅m (251 lb⋅ft)

Dimensions
- Dry weight: 58 kg

Emissions
- Emissions target standard: Zero Emission

Nissan EM is a brand of electric motors by Nissan. The first EM motor, the EM61, debuted in 2010 as part of the first-generation Nissan Leaf. The EM series of motors have since been used in various hybrid and all-electric Nissan vehicles.

== EM61 ==
The EM61 made its debut in 2010. It was used only in the first generation Nissan Leaf (ZE0 2010-2012). The EM61 generates 280Nm of peak torque and has a max rpm of 10,390.

== EM57 ==
The EM57 was first released with the 'AZE0' Nissan Leaf refresh in 2013. This motor has a smaller footprint compared to the EM61, allowing for 11.7 kg of weight savings in the inverter/motor package. The motor also trades some peak torque for a more efficient power range. It peaks at 250Nm of torque and has a max rpm of 10,500.

It is used in the following electric vehicles:

- Nissan Leaf (AZE0 2013–2017)
- Nissan e-NV200 (2014–present)
- Nissan Leaf (ZE1 40kWh, 2018–present)
- Nissan Leaf (ZE1 e+ 62kWh, 2019–present)

It is also used in the following hybrids:

- Nissan Note e-Power (2017–2020)
- Nissan Serena e-Power (2018–present)
- Nissan Kicks e-Power (2020–present)

=== EM57 refresh ===
In 2018, the EM57 motor received an update with the introduction of the ZE1 Nissan LEAF. Depending on which inverter was mounted on the motor, power levels were increased to 110kW (320Nm) and on the e+ model it was further raised to 160kW (340Nm). The rpm range is also increased to 11,330 on the e+ LEAF. The motor received three tweaks:

- Slight reduction of permanent magnet material
- L-shaped coolant inlet
- Minor casting tweak to front&rear cover

== EM47 ==
The EM47 motor released in 2020 with the refreshed Nissan Note. It is only used in Nissan's e-POWER lineup. It is matched with an inverter which has a 40% size reduction and 30% weight reduction. The EM47 has a max speed of 10,500rpm and produce 254Nm of torque.

It is used in the following hybrids:

- Nissan Note e-Power (2020–present)
- Nissan Kicks e-Power (2022–present; Thailand)
