= Nissan Vanette =

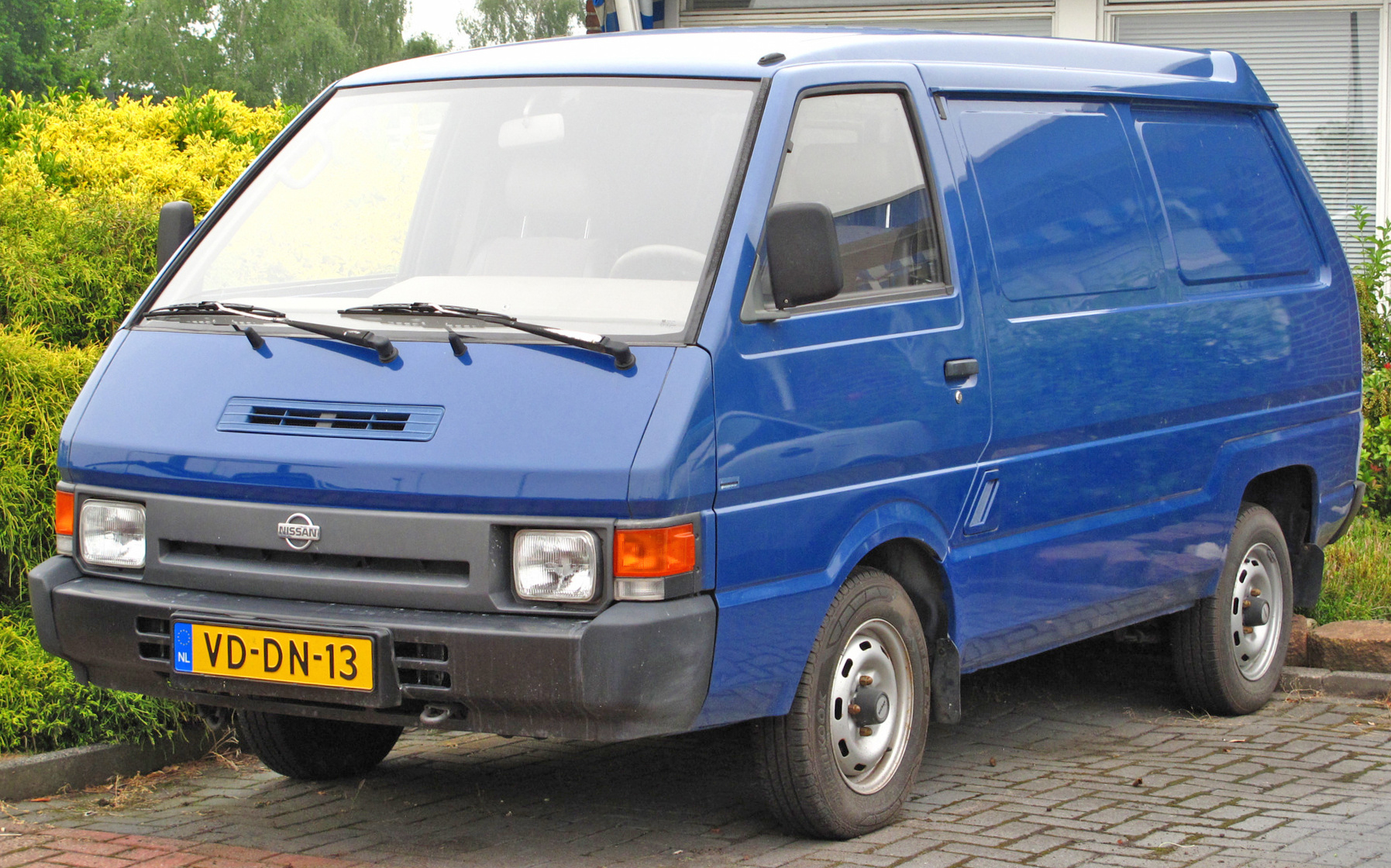
- 1994 Nissan Vanette (C22)

Overview
- Manufacturer: Nissan (Nissan Aichi) (1978–1994); Mazda (1995–2017)
- Production: 1978–1994 (Nissan); 1994– June 2017 (Mazda)

Body and chassis
- Class: Light commercial vehicle
- Body style: Van; Pickup truck
- Layout: FMR layout

Chronology
- Predecessor: Datsun Sunny Cab/Nissan Cherry Cab
- Successor: Nissan Serena; Nissan NV200/Nissan NV300 (commercial models); Nissan Atlas (Vanette truck)

The Nissan Vanette (Japanese: 日産・バネット, Hepburn: Nissan Banetto) is a cabover van and pickup truck produced by the Japanese automaker Nissan from 1978 until 1994. Production in Malaysia continued until about 2010, while Nissan continued to use the Vanette name on a rebadged Mazda Bongo with a more commercial purpose until 2017. The first two generations were engineered by Nissan's Aichi Manufacturing Division. The van has also been sold as the Nissan Sunny-Vanette or Nissan Van. The private purchase passenger platform was replaced by the Nissan Serena in 1991, renamed Vanette in various international markets, and came equipped with multiple engine and drivetrain configurations.

Both 2WD and 4WD versions were produced, with manual, automatic, floor and column shift options available. While no longer produced for the Japanese market, it was still available in other markets around the world such as Malaysia. Production ended around 2010, eventually being replaced by the Nissan NV200.

== History ==
The first appearance of a cab-over truck/delivery van appeared in 1962 with the Datsun Cablight, a rebadged version of the earlier Kurogane Mighty Nissan acquired when they assumed the operations of Tokyu Kogyo Kurogane. As the Cablight was reengineered, it was offered as a cab-over truck and van called the Datsun Sunny Cab/Nissan Cherry Cab (C20) introduced in 1969, and was one size smaller from the Prince Homer truck and the Prince Homy van. The cab-over approach allowed the exterior dimensions to remain unchanged while increasing the length of the cargo area of the Nissan Sunny truck. The Sunny Cab/Cherry Cab passenger van could accommodate five passengers, and an extended-length version could carry eight people. The Cab Vans did not have sliding passenger doors; instead, they had conventional front-hinged doors with extended lengths on the passenger side. The rear tailgate was a clamshell design where the door separated into two pieces that would extend up, with a tailgate on the lower half of the door.

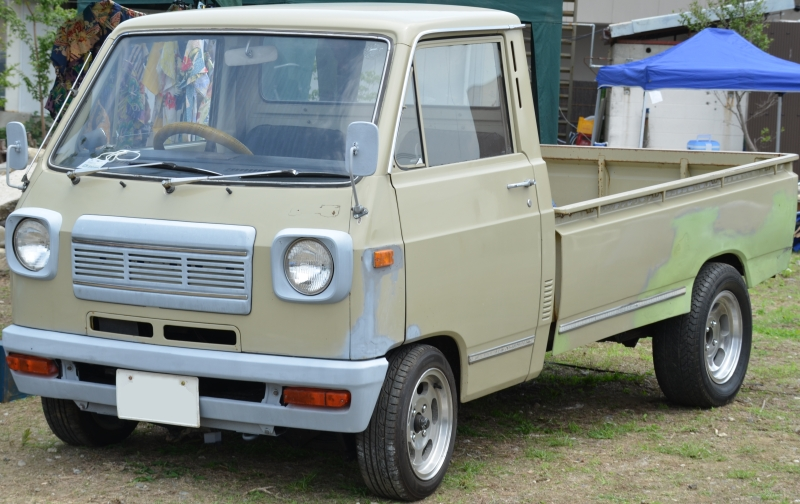
Datsun Sunny cab (C20)

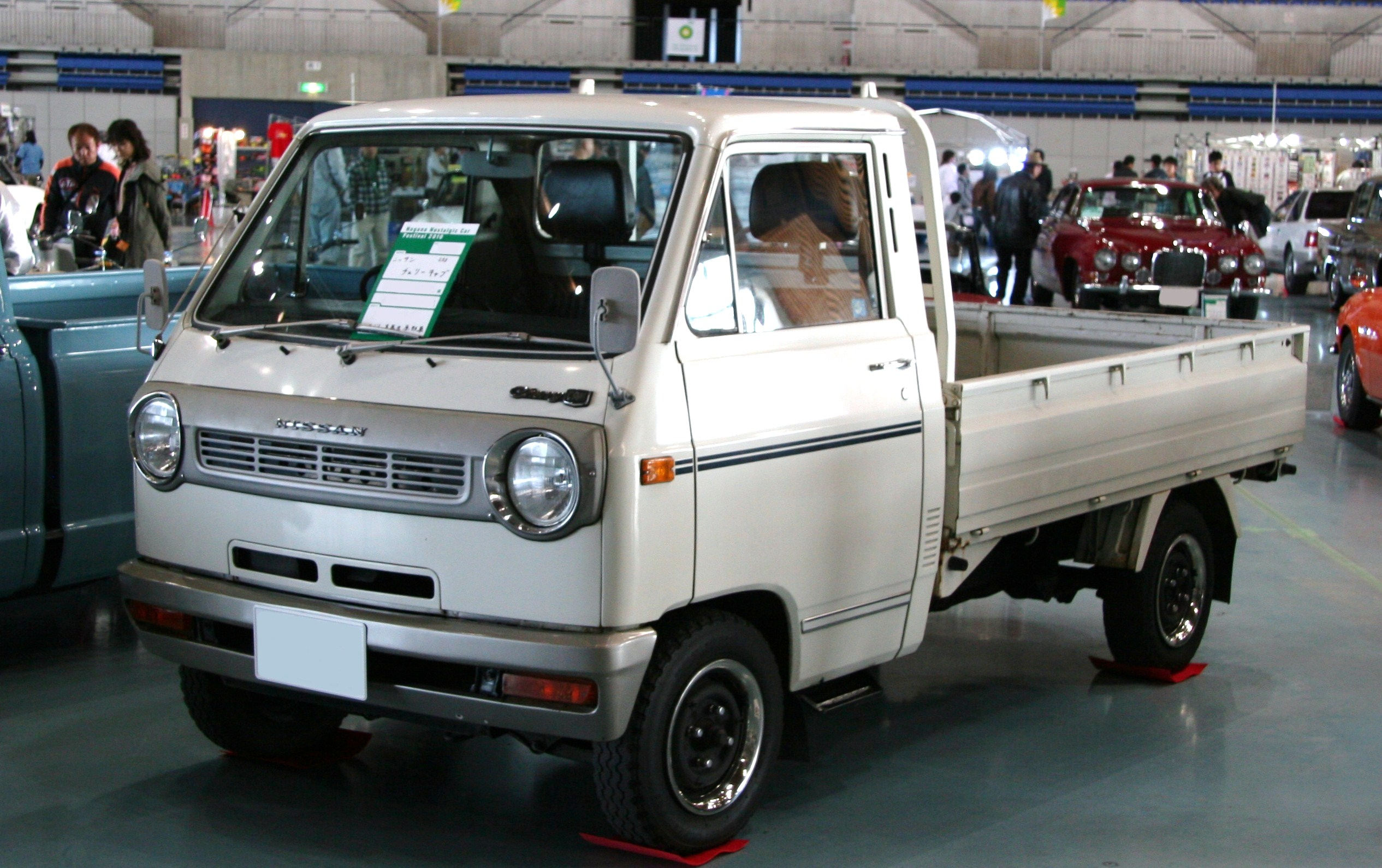
Nissan Cherry Cab (C20)

The commercial model was basic, keeping the price low. The Sunny Truck continued to be built after the introduction of the second generation passenger version, and was only replaced in early 1971 by the new B120-series truck. The cab-over trucks were renamed the Nissan Vanette and the Nissan Cherry Cab/Vanette.

== First generation (C120; 1978–1988) ==
Datsun Vanette (C120)
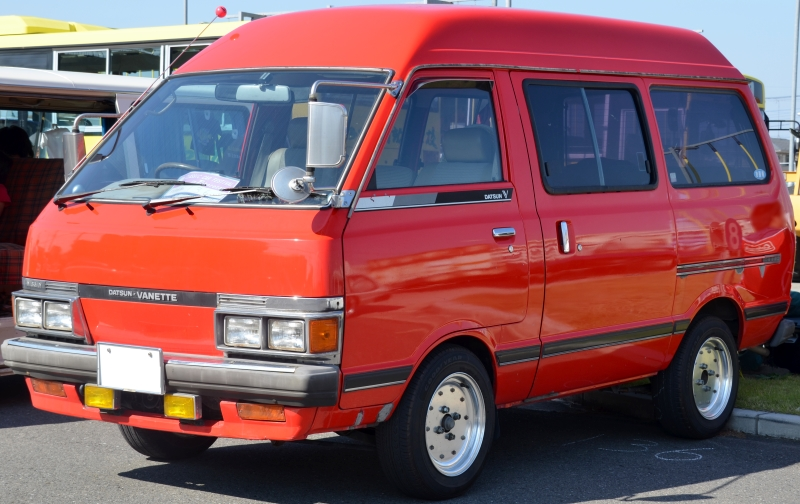

Overview
- Also called: Datsun Vanette; Nissan Cherry Vanette; Nissan Sunny Vanette; Yulon Nissan Bobby
- Production: 1978–1988
- Assembly: Oppama Plant, Yokosuka, Kanagawa, Japan; Barcelona, Spain

Body and chassis
- Body style: 2-door truck; 4/5-door van; 4-door minibus (Coach)
- Related: Nissan Sunny (B210/B310)

Powertrain
- Engine: 1.2 L A12 I4; 1.4 L A14 I4; 1.5 L A15 I4; 2.0 L Z20 I4; 2.0 L LD20 diesel I4
- Transmission: 4-speed manual; 3-speed automatic

Dimensions
- Wheelbase: 2,075 mm (81.7 in); 2,405 mm (94.7 in) (LWB)
- Length: 3,900–3,930 mm (153.5–154.7 in); 4,230 mm (166.5 in) (LWB); 4,270 mm (168.1 in) (LWB truck)
- Width: 1,600–1,605 mm (63.0–63.2 in); 1,695 mm (66.7 in) (Vanette Largo)
- Height: 1,755–1,795 mm (69.1–70.7 in); 1,965–1,985 mm (77.4–78.1 in) (high roof)
- Curb weight: 865–1,050 kg (1,907–2,315 lb)

Introduced in October 1978 as a replacement for the 1969 Nissan Cherry Cab/Sunny Cab C20 and Nissan Sunny Cab Van/Nissan Cherry Cab Van, the first Vanette was exported as the Datsun C20 (later the Nissan C20) or as the Nissan Datsun Vanette (later the Nissan Vanette). In the home market, it was initially marketed as either the 'Nissan Sunny Vanette' or the 'Nissan Cherry Vanette', depending on the distribution network, although in engineering terms, it borrowed heavily from the rear-wheel-drive generations of the Sunny line—namely the B210 and B310 series models, with which it shared engines and transmissions. The Sunny Vanette was sold through Nissan Satio Store and the Cherry Vanette was sold through Nissan Cherry Store locations. These two models had somewhat differing front-end treatment. In March 1980, a Datsun Vanette version was also added, which was sold through the Nissan Bluebird Store dealer network. The Datsun Vanette received twin headlights, while its related models had single headlights. It was a junior model to the larger Nissan Caravan.

It was initially available in three lines: a truck version, vans (usually with passenger accommodation), and as a nine-seat minibus (Vanette Coach). The Coach received a 1.4 L (1,397 cc) A14 four-cylinder, producing 75 PS (55 kW) at 5,400 rpm. The van and truck versions originally had to make do with the lesser A12 of 1.2 L (1,171 cc) and 64 PS (47 kW) at the same engine speed. Later, the 1400 engine became available in Van and Truck versions as well. In July 1979, a high-roof version was added, as well as a long wheelbase van and ten-seater Coach version. This was stretched by 33 cm between the front and side doors; LWB versions were never available with the A12 engine. Some versions received separate air conditioning outlets for the rear.

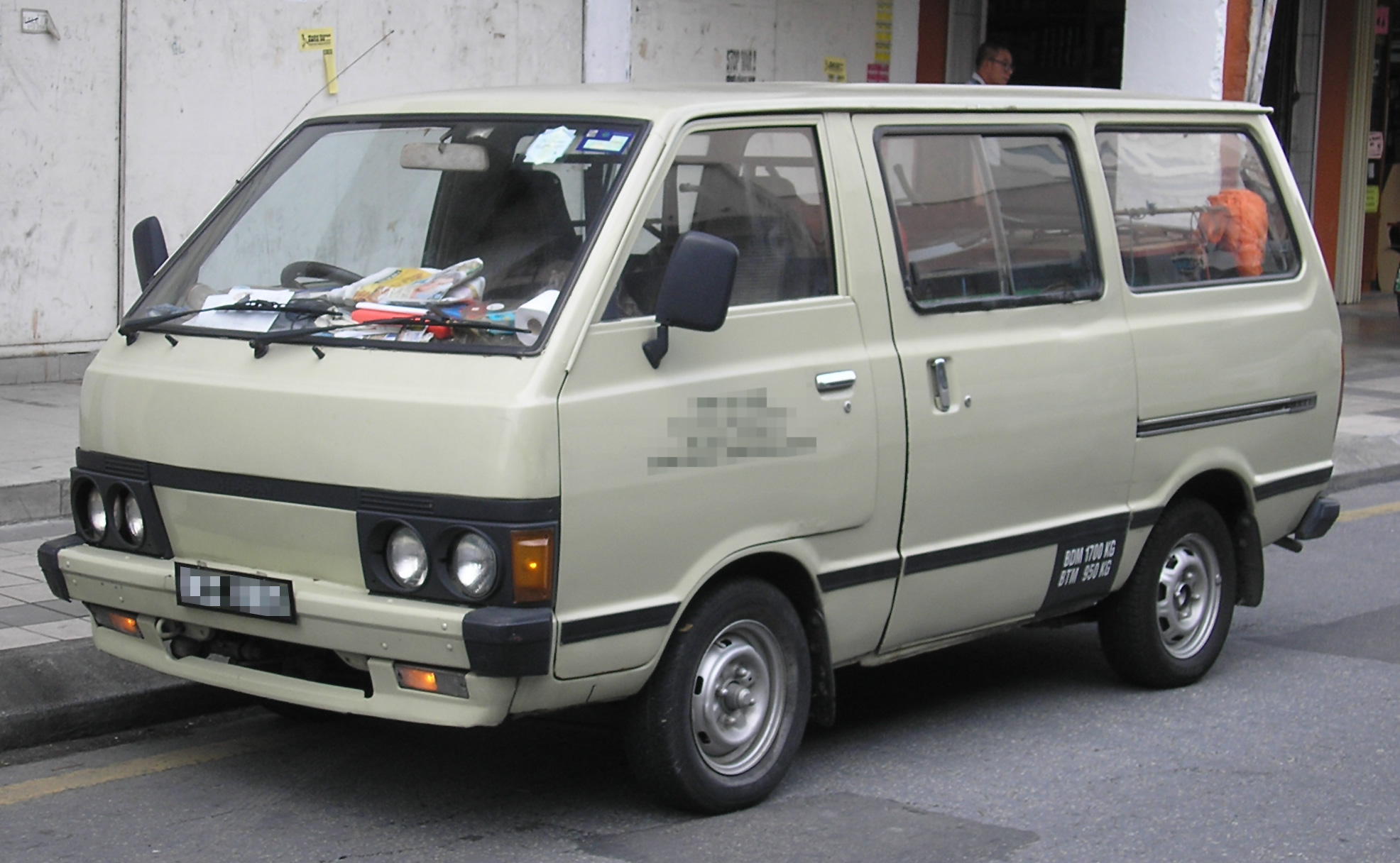
Nissan Vanette (C120, Malaysia)

In June 1980, the Coach version changed from the A14 to the larger (1,487 cc) A15 engine, offering 83 PS (61 kW). There was also a luxurious SGL version of the Vanette Coach added, with an available sunroof and swivelling captain's chairs in the rear – both firsts for the segment in Japan. To indicate its luxurious nature, the SGL received double square headlights for a more modern appearance. In June 1981, the LD20 diesel engine was added, as was a 2-litre gasoline version (Z20) for the top-of-the-line SGX version.

In 1981, Nissan introduced a smaller passenger vehicle which had sliding passenger doors on both sides of the vehicle, with conventional front doors, called the Nissan Prairie, making the Vanette/Largo no longer the smallest cargo van offered.

In October 1982, minor changes occurred (along with the introduction of the bigger "Largo"). The dashboard was redesigned, while the base 'CT' model received front disc brakes, the optional air conditioning system was modernized, and an inexpensive 'FL' Coach version was added. In October 1983, a DX-A version was added, followed by modifications to the transmission carried out in August 1985. The following month, production of Van and Coach models ended as they were replaced by the C22 Vanette. The truck versions of the C120 Vanette remained in production (with light modifications carried out in August 1986) until September 1988.

On February 3, 1986, Nissan and Daewoo signed an agreement where the latter would build the Vanette under a technical collaboration agreement. This was partly in response to the South Korean government's announcement that it would abolish restrictions on manufacturing certain vehicle types. On May 3, 1987, the first Daewoo Vanette would be sold in South Korea.

=== Vanette Largo ===
The Vanette Largo (GC120) was introduced in October 1982 and was a wider (by 90 mm, to stay just beneath the important Japanese 1,700 mm tax threshold) and somewhat longer version. This was then developed into a cargo version built in Spain (by Nissan Ibérica), called the Nissan/Datsun Vanette Cargo. This largely supplanted the smaller Vanette versions in European markets. Engines were the A15 and Z20 gasoline versions, accompanied by the diesel LD20 (also available turbocharged). The Spanish-built versions were originally intended to be built with a Spanish-made Perkins diesel motor but this did not materialize. There was a minibus "Coach" version of the Largo as well, with a luxurious "Grand Saloon" version topping the range.

The Vanette Largo continued in production until a GC22 successor arrived, in May 1986. From this point, the Vanette name was dropped and the Largo became a separate, more luxurious model in its own right. In the Japanese market, the C120 vehicle was either marketed as the Datsun Vanette Largo or as a Nissan with the Cherry and Sunny prefixes. The Spanish C220 received a facelift and continued to be built into the 1990s, and was mostly sold in markets which hindered the import of Japanese-built vehicles.

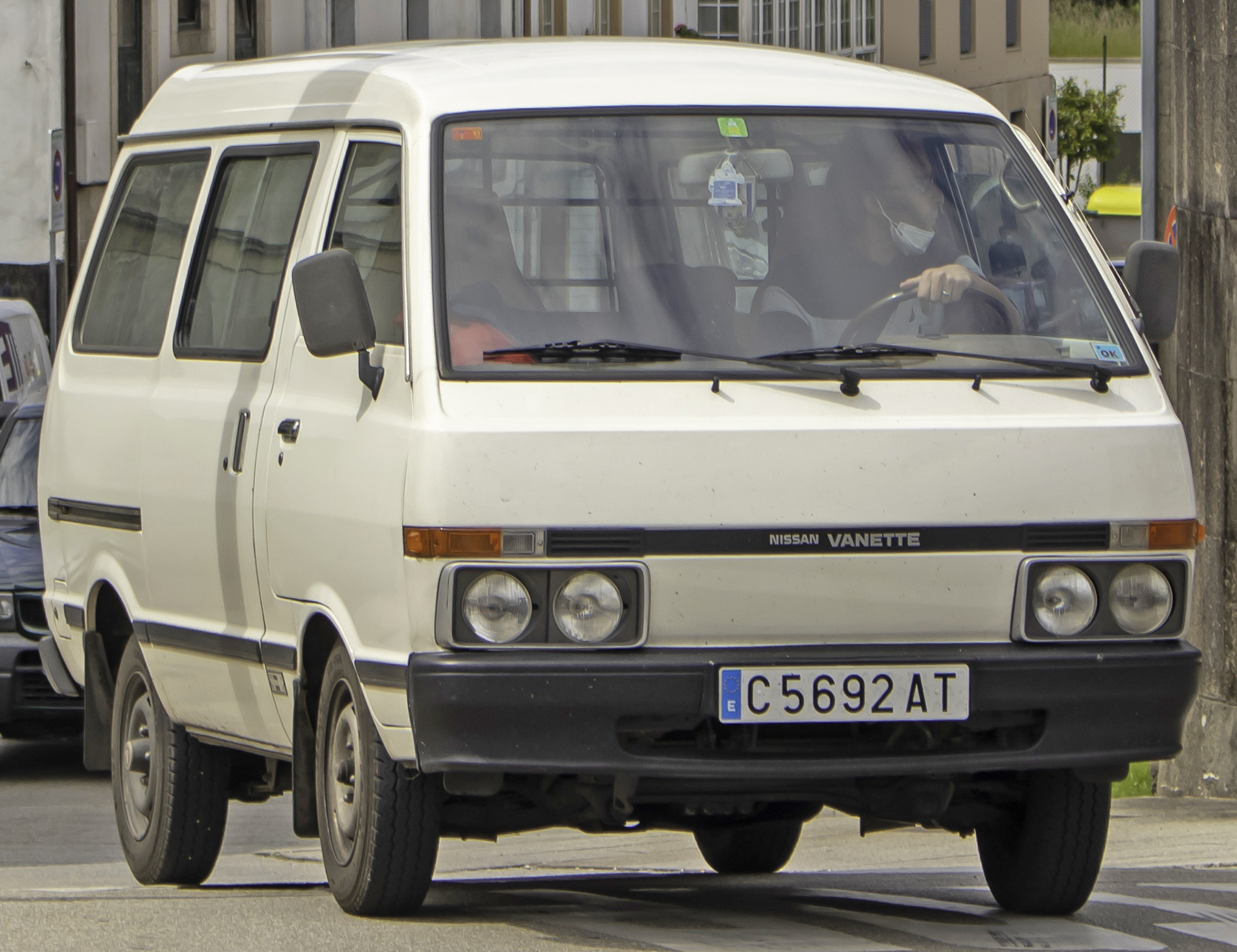
Nissan Vanette Largo (C220, EU-spec)

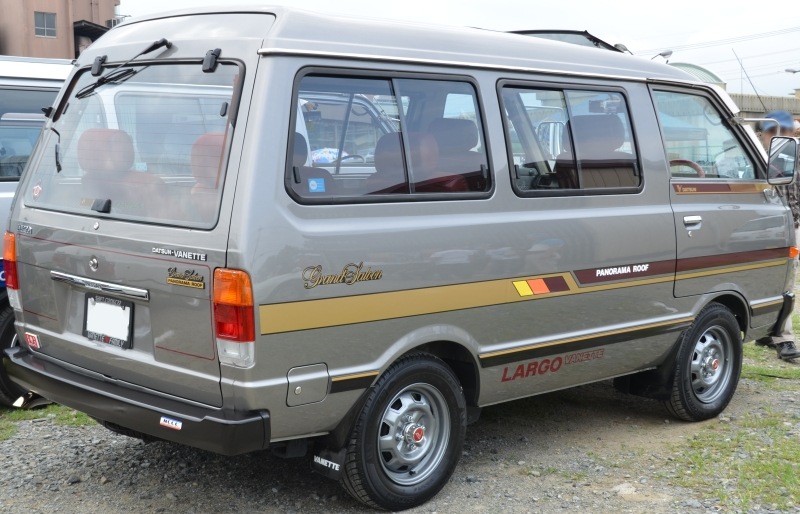
Datsun Vanette Largo (C220, JDM-spec)

== Second generation (C22; 1985–1994) ==
Nissan Vanette (C22)
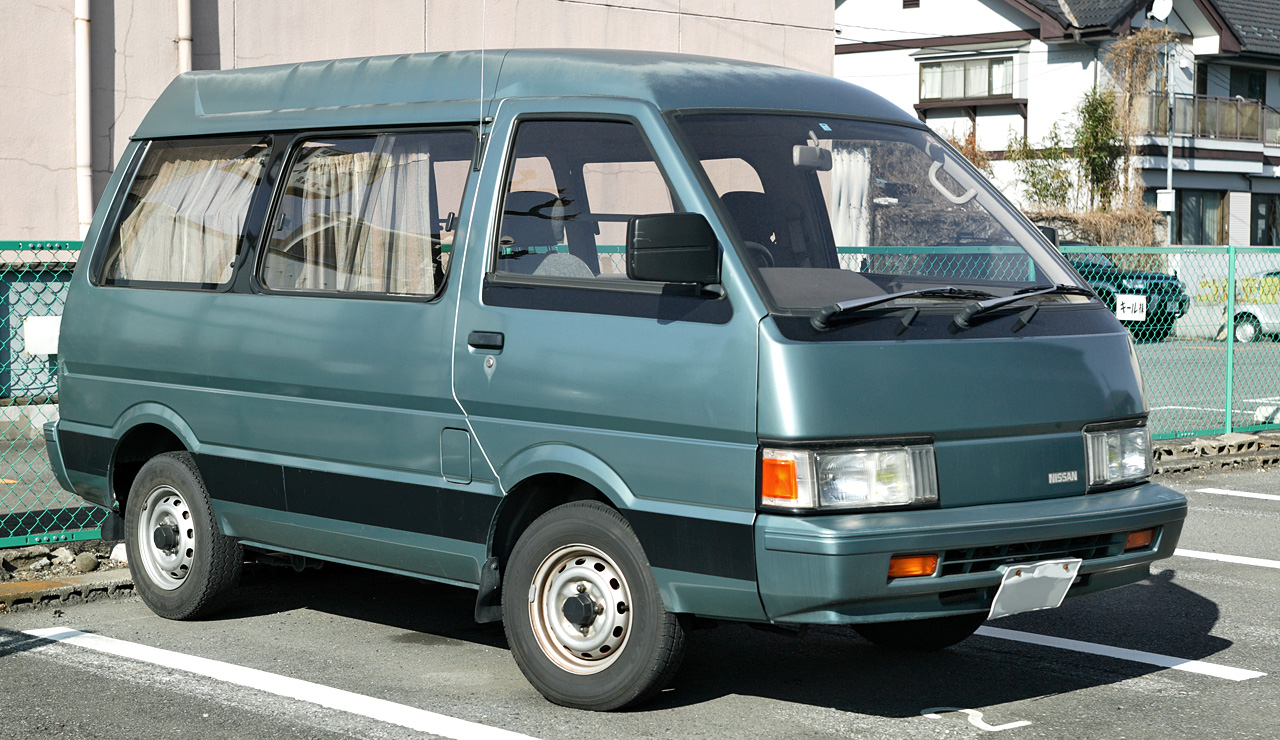
- 1988–1994 Nissan Vanette (C22)

Overview
- Also called: Nissan Ichi Van (Mexico); Nissan Largo; Nissan Nomad (Australia); Nissan Van (USA); Daewoo Vanette (South Korea); Sanxing SXZ6440 (China); Yunbao YB6440 (China)
- Production: 1985–1994; 1993–2001 (Philippines); 1997–2010 (Malaysia)
- Assembly: Oppama Plant, Yokosuka, Kanagawa, Japan; Zhanjiang, Guangdong, China (CKD); Santa Rosa City, Philippines (1993–2001); Segambut, Malaysia (TCMA) (1997–2010)

Body and chassis
- Body style: 2-door truck; 4/5-door van; 4-door minibus (Coach)
- Related: Ashok Leyland Dost

Powertrain
- Engine: petrol: 1.2 L A12 I4; 1.4 L A14 I4; 1.5 L A15 I4; 1.8 L CA18ET I4; 2.0 L CA20S I4; 2.0 L Z20 I4; 2.4 L Z24i I4; diesel: 2.0 L LD20 I4
- Transmission: 5-speed manual; 4-speed automatic

Dimensions
- Wheelbase: 2,075 mm (81.7 in); LWB: 2,405 mm (94.7 in)
- Length: 3,980–4,050 mm (156.7–159.4 in); LWB: 4,230 mm (166.5 in); LWB truck: 4,270 mm (168.1 in)
- Width: 1,600–1,605 mm (63.0–63.2 in); 1,695 mm (66.7 in) (Vanette Largo)
- Height: 1,755–1,795 mm (69.1–70.7 in); 1,965–1,985 mm (77.4–78.1 in) (high roof)
- Curb weight: 865–1,050 kg (1,907–2,315 lb)

=== Japan ===
Five trim levels, four engine options, and two transmission options were available for the C22 Vanette COACH series launched in Japan.

- SC: Five- or six-seater, available with 1.5L A15 (67ps) petrol engine or 2L LD20.II (67ps) diesel engine. Manual transmission only. Distinguished by round headlamps and no rear screen wiper.
- GL: Eight- or nine-seater, available with 1.5L or 2L diesel. Manual transmission only. Square headlamps.
- SGL: Eight- or nine-seater, available with 1.5L or 2L diesel. Automatic transmission optional. Rectangle headlamps with high roof. All SGL variants have collapsible seats, rotatable middle-row seat, and rear air conditioning. Longer body length of 4050mm versus the SC and GL at 3980mm.
- SGL Panorama Roof: Similar to SGL except with the optional glass sunroof that stretches from first-row to second-row seats.
- SGL EXCEL: Eight-seater, available with 2L petrol Z20S or 2L diesel LD20.II engine. Later models came with CA20 petrol engine. Automatic transmission optional. Top-of-the-line model which comes with color-coded bumpers, chrome trimming, central locking, panoramic glass roof, factory-fitted audio, and cooler box mounted in the center console.

The more substantial Vanette Largo was available with three engines: the 2-litre CA20S petrol four, the 1.8-litre turbocharged CA18ET, and the 2-litre LD20T turbodiesel. The turbo petrol unit was fitted to the Super Cruising and Grand Cruising models and, on paper, had better gas mileage than the 2-litre petrol option. A late-model update with enlarged version similar to the US-market Nissan Van was again sold in Japan as the Largo, until 1992 when the Serena-based Nissan Largo was launched.

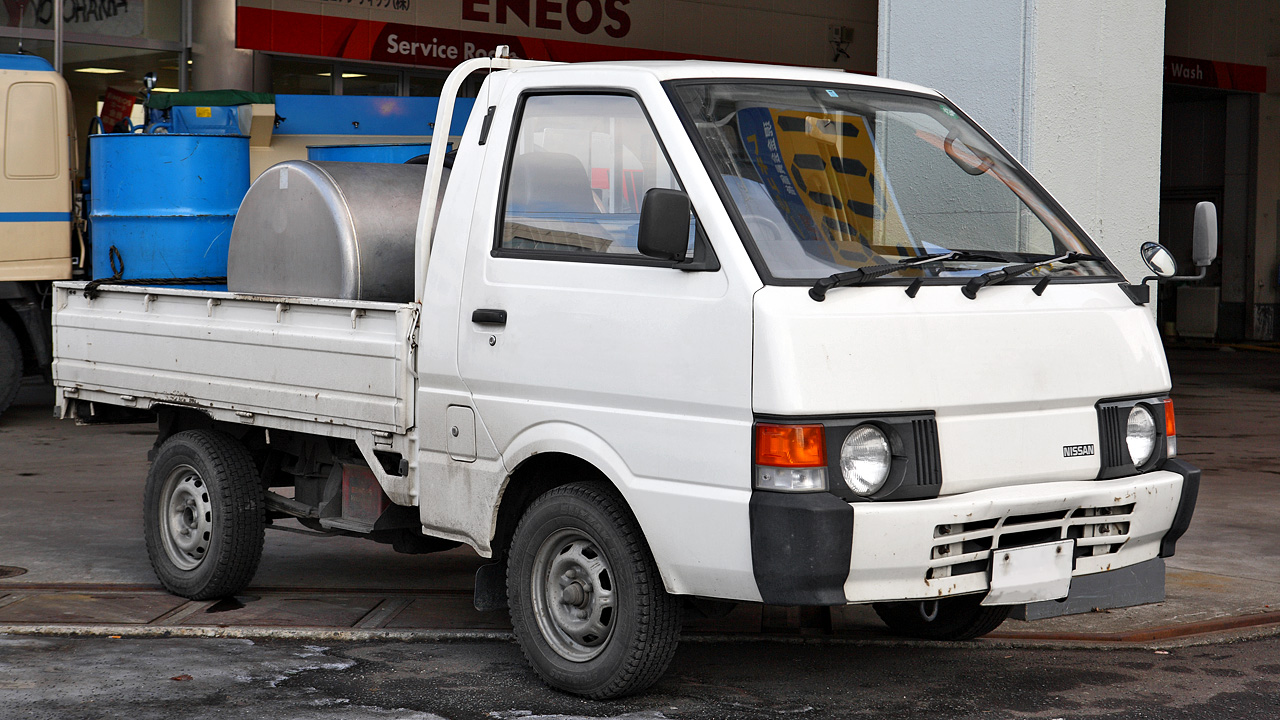
Nissan Vanette Truck

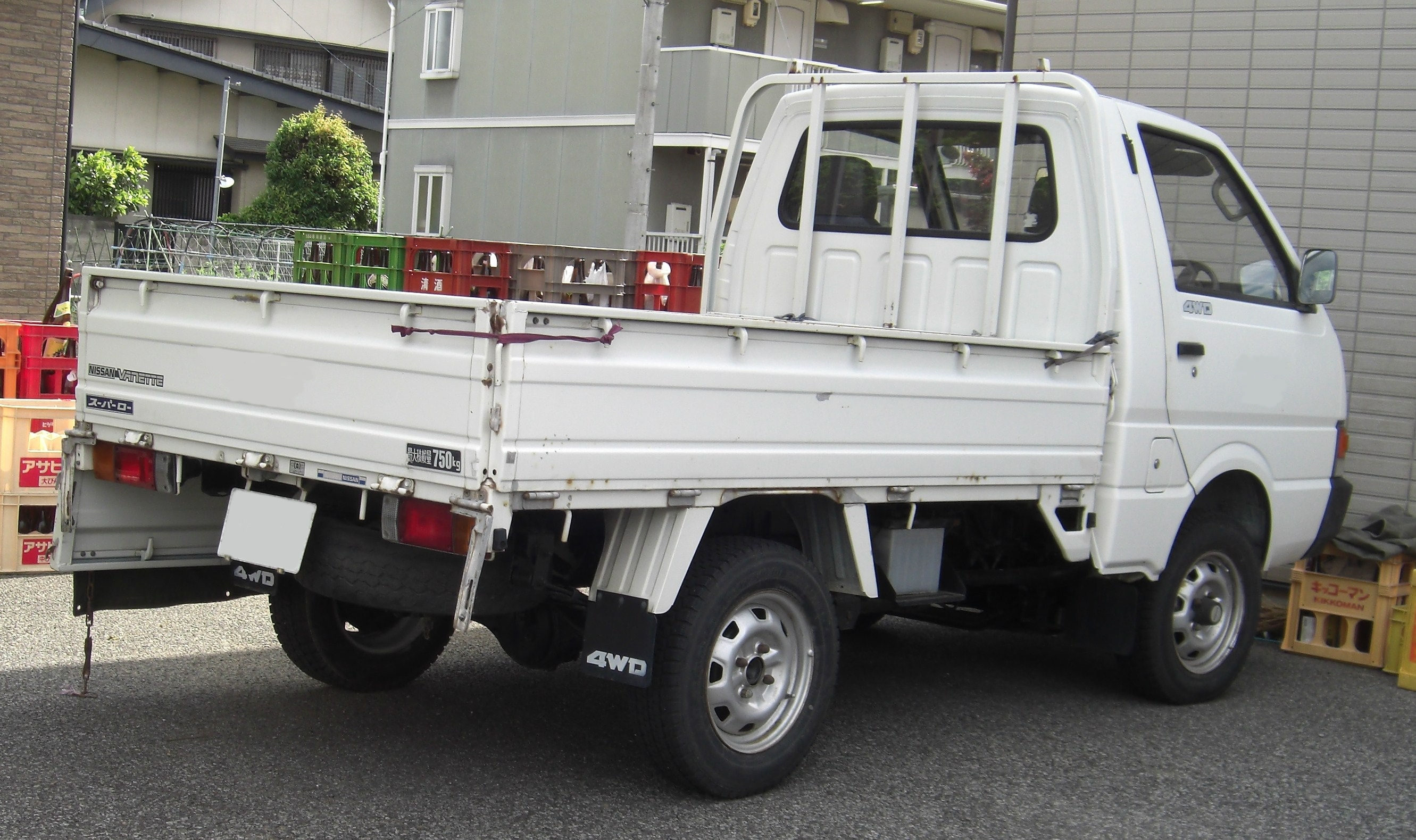
Nissan Vanette Truck rear view

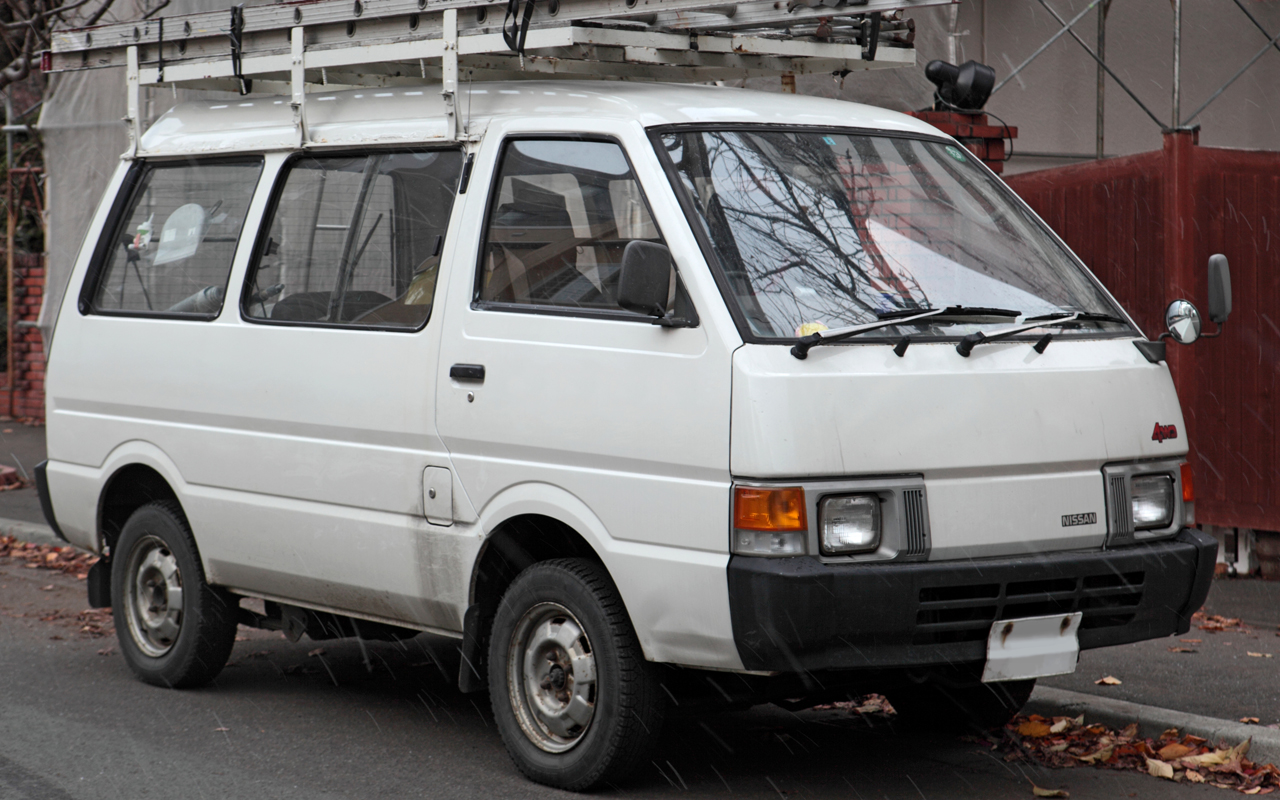
Nissan Vanette Van

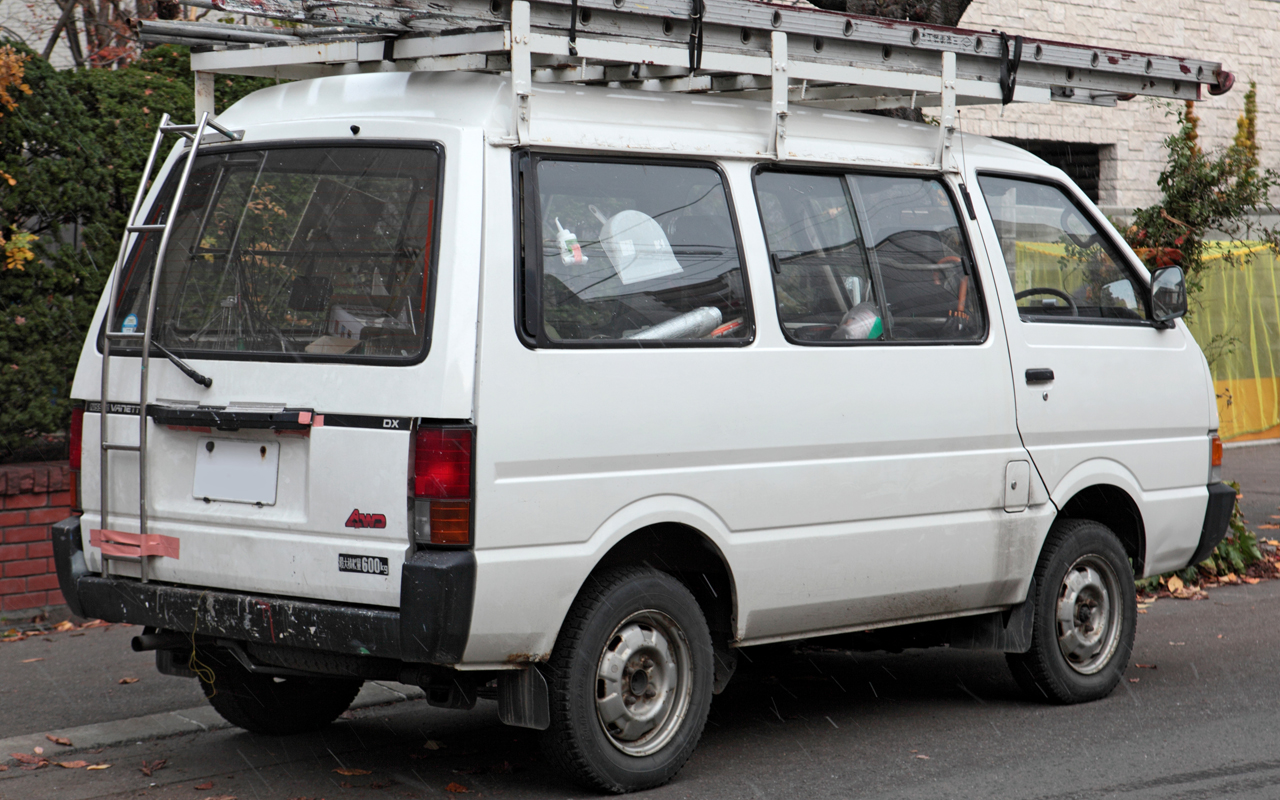
Nissan Vanette Van rear view

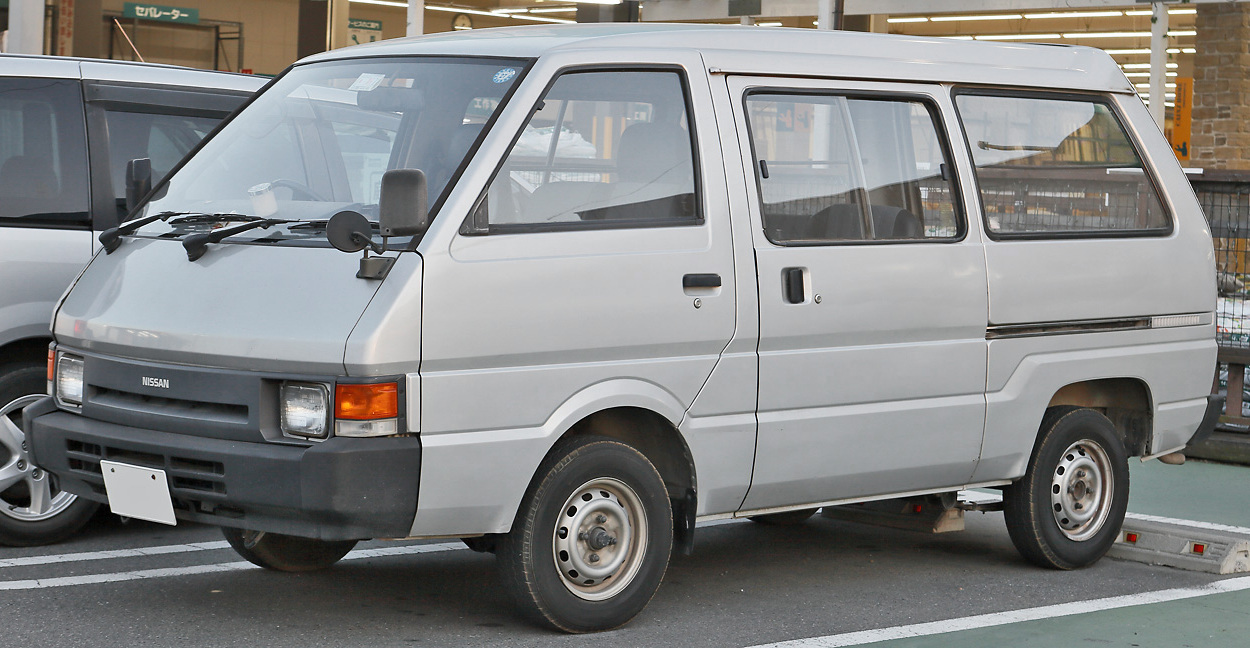
Nissan Largo (GC22)

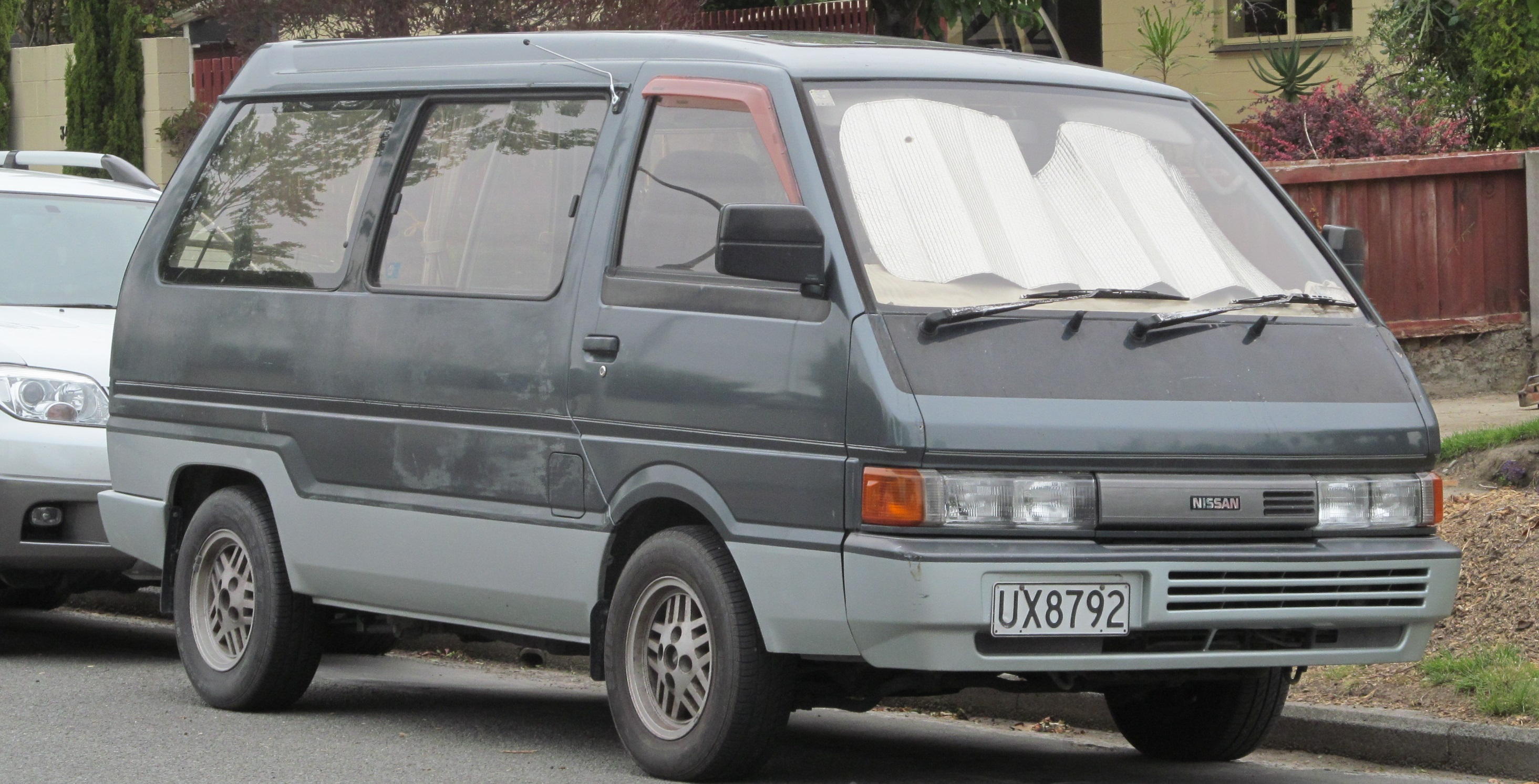
Nissan Largo Super Saloon (C22)

=== South Korea ===
The Vanette would continue to be produced in South Korea under the Daewoo name from 1986 until 1992. It suffered from a poorly performing Isuzu 2.2-liter diesel engine which was used instead of the original Nissan engine. In addition to the high NVH levels and fuel consumption, the Vanette was sold as either a 9-seater van or a single-cab truck, while buyers' preferences were for 12-seater vans and double-cab trucks, and sales were accordingly slow. A 12-seat van was eventually developed but Vanette sales remained low and the model was not replaced in the Daewoo lineup.

=== United States ===
The Nissan C22 was modified for the United States market to compete in the burgeoning minivan segment, and also to compete with the similarly sized Toyota Van and Mitsubishi Van. This van was sold as the "Nissan Van" for model years 1987 and 1988, where it was billed as a more affordable alternative to Chrysler's minivans. Most of the vans were sold in the Sun Belt states, particularly California, Texas, and Florida. To meet American consumers' preferences for features like air conditioning and highway capability, Nissan had to engineer its larger 2.4-liter Z24i engine into the C22. The C22 was not originally designed for such a large engine, and the resulting tight quarters would later contribute to overheating and engine fire issues.

In 1994, after four safety recalls did not end the engine fire problems, and with a class action lawsuit pending, Nissan took the unprecedented step of recalling every Nissan Van sold in the US. Van owners were offered Kelley Blue Book value or more for their van, and most accepted, but a few opted to keep their vans. Critics argued that Nissan had been long aware of the problems with the vans (the first reports of fires appeared in 1987, shortly after they went on sale in the US), but did not take action for years, after which they had been replaced by the Nissan Quest. By the time of the recall in 1994, at least 135 fires had been reported, although none of them had resulted in deaths or injuries. The class-action settlement offered discounts on the purchase of a new Nissan vehicle. The vehicles which were recalled were crushed en masse.

The Nissan Van was intended mainly as a stopgap for the North American market until a proper minivan could be introduced, and it was replaced by the Nissan Quest in 1993, a vehicle designed in a joint venture with Ford.

=== Malaysia ===
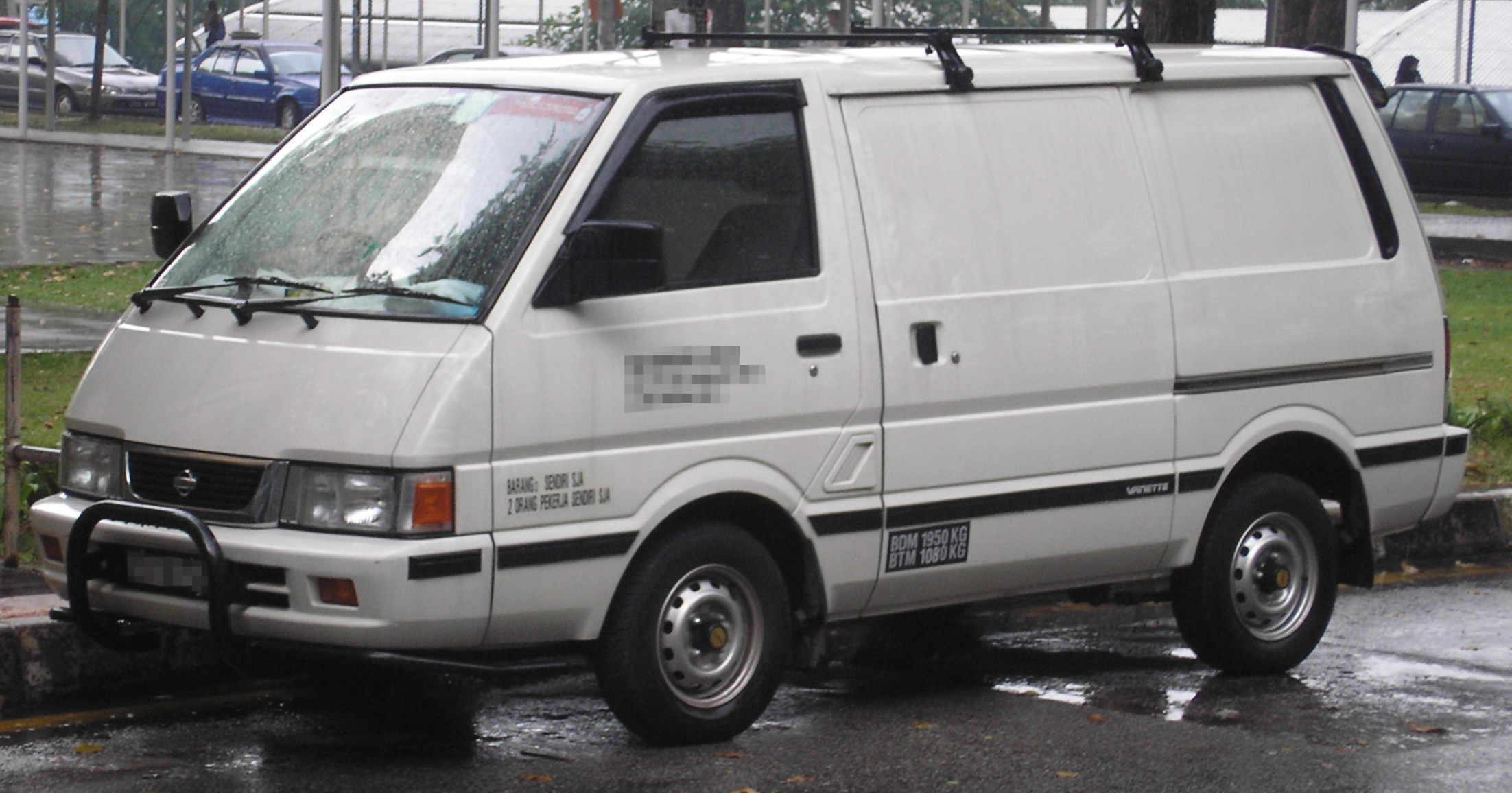
Nissan Vanette (C22, Malaysia)

The C22 Nissan Vanette was domestically built in Malaysia at the Tan Chong Motor Assemblies plant in Segambut, Kuala Lumpur. Produced for 13 years, between 1997 and 2010, it was the longest running model built in Malaysia, and had been exported to multiple markets. Malaysia Vanettes were produced in both truck and van configurations, including chassis cabs, open bed trucks, and panel or windowed vans, and are equipped with 1.5-liter 82 PS (60 kW) pushrod A15 engines. While it has received several facelifts in its run, its body profile and 1980s interior remain largely unchanged.

Malaysia was the last country to produce the C22 Vanette. After a brief hiatus, the Nissan NV200 was launched as the C22's replacement, retaining the "Vanette" name for the Malaysian market.

=== Philippines ===
The Nissan Vanette was available in the Philippines until the end of 1999 as the Nissan Vanette Grand coach. In its final version it remains essentially the same Vanette as in previous years except for a different wheel design, upgraded seat materials and a faux wood trim dashboard. The sole engine available is the Z20 2.0-liter gasoline engine. Unlike in other Asian countries, no diesel variant was offered or available, which was an oversight on Nissan's part that could have made the difference in the van's popularity.

=== India ===
The C22 Vanette provided the basis for Ashok Leyland's "Dost", the Indian truck manufacturer's first entry into this market segment.

=== Gallery ===
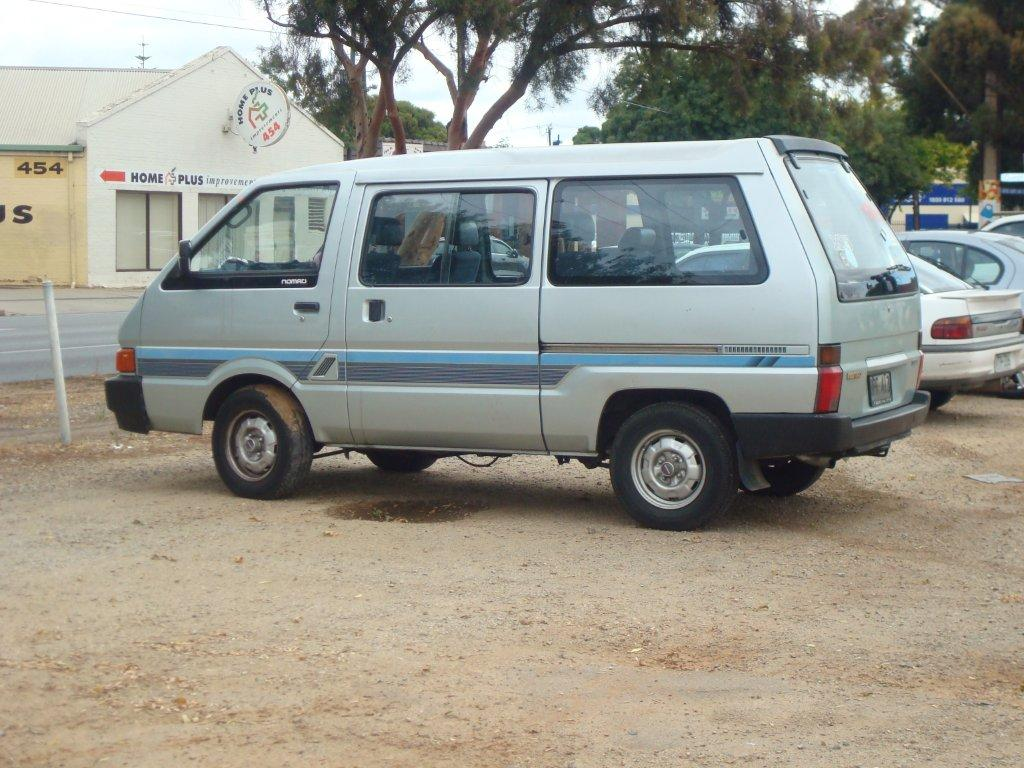
1990 Nissan Nomad GX (Australia)

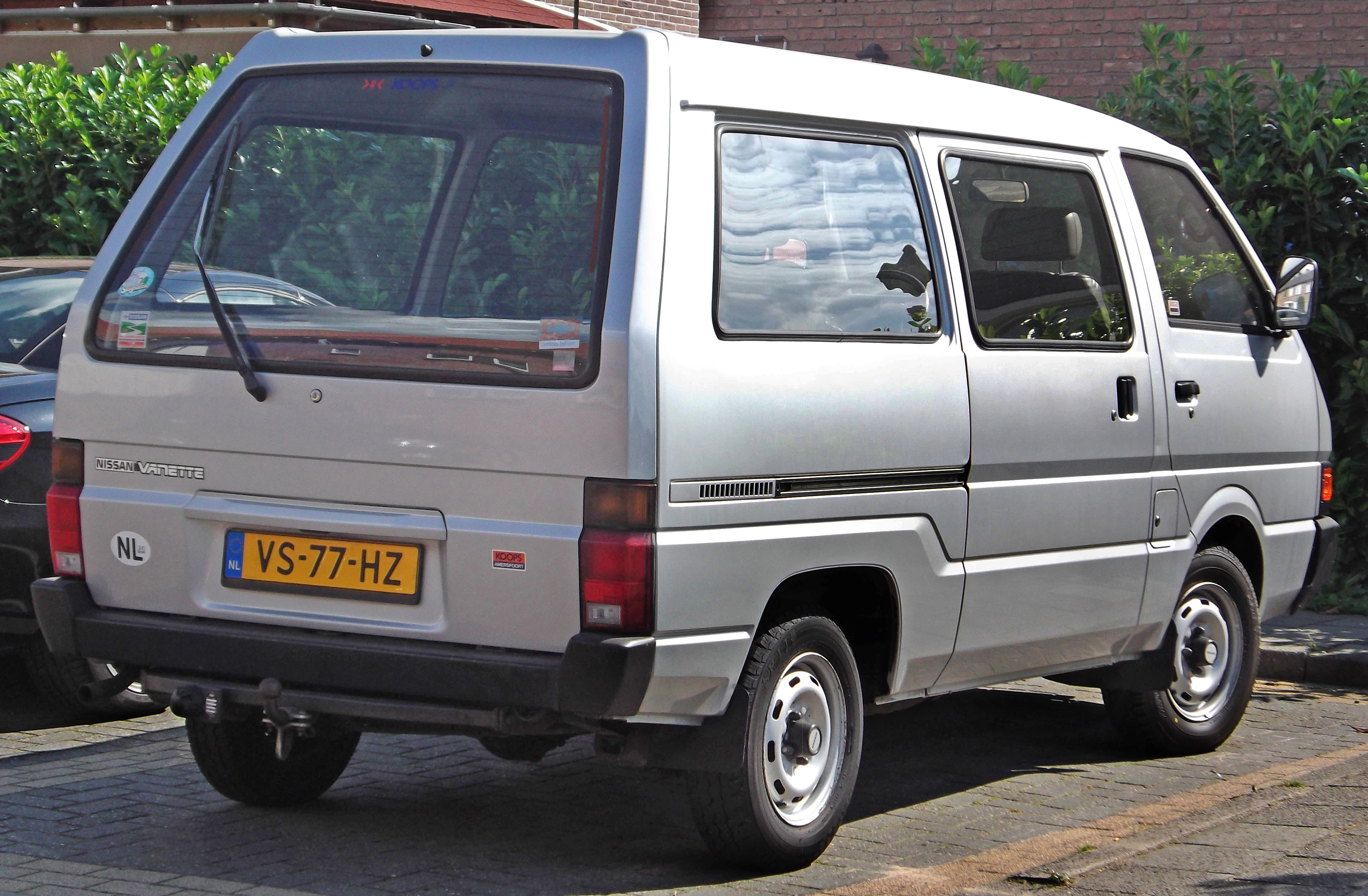
Nissan Vanette (Netherlands)

== Third generation (S20, SE, SK; 1994–1999) ==
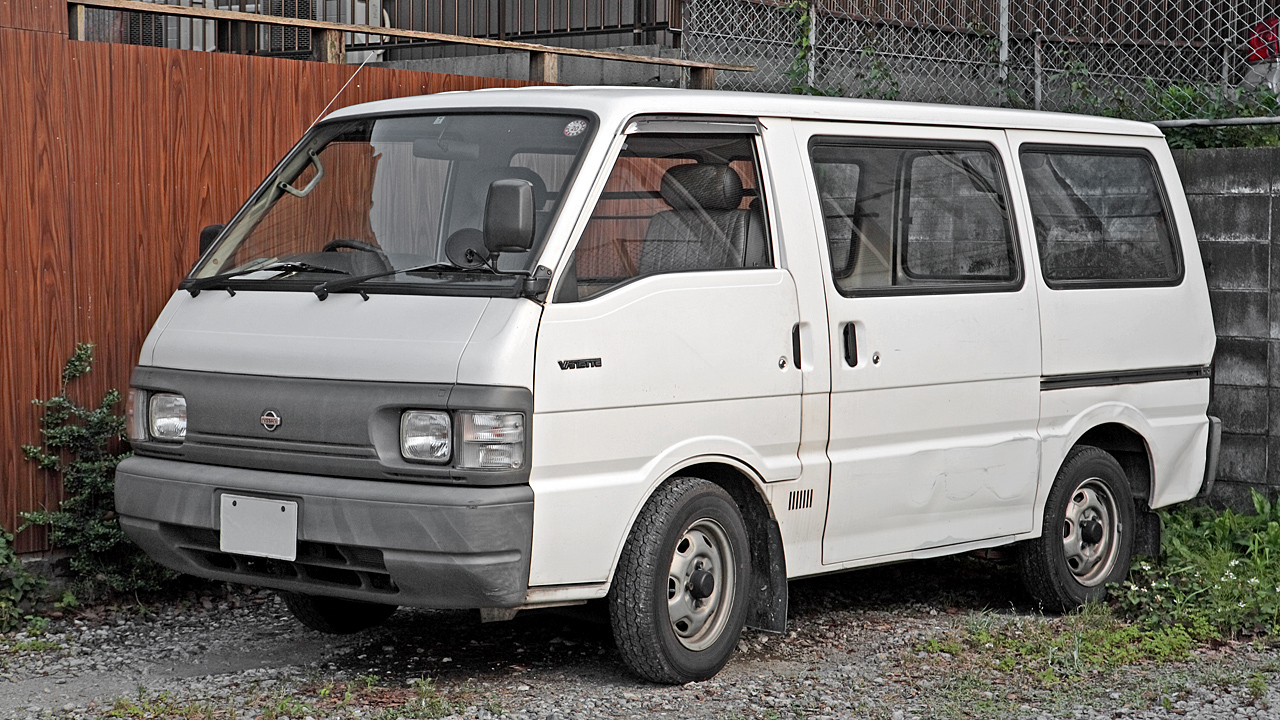
1994–1999 Nissan Vanette (S20).

The third-generation Vanette is a rebadged Mazda Bongo, which is also rebadged as the Ford Econovan and Ford Spectron.

== Fourth generation (S21, SK; 1998–2017) ==
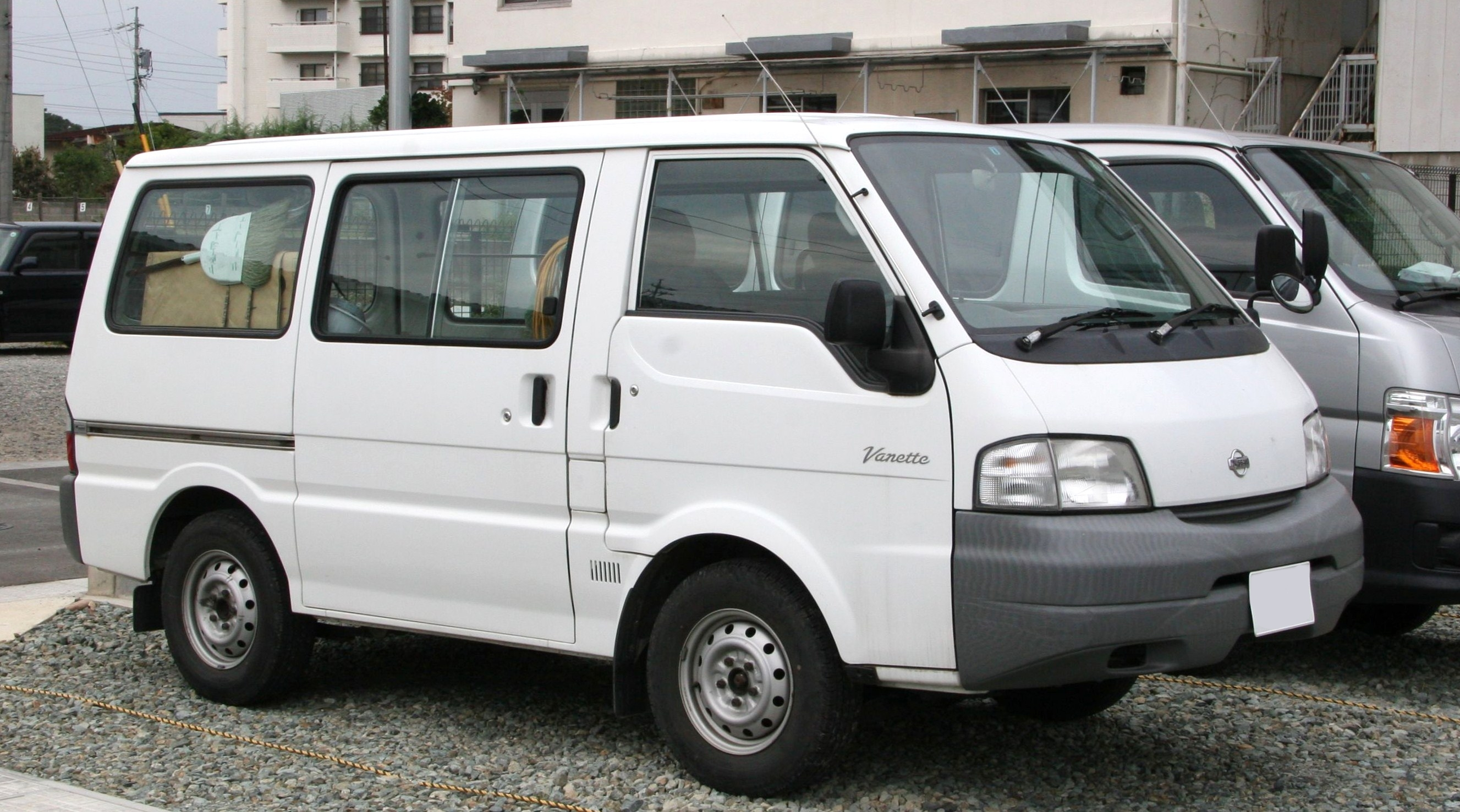
1998–2017 Nissan Vanette (S21).

The fourth-generation Vanette is a rebadged Mazda Bongo. The successor of the Vanette van is the Nissan NV200 Vanette.
