= Nissan J engine =

J engine
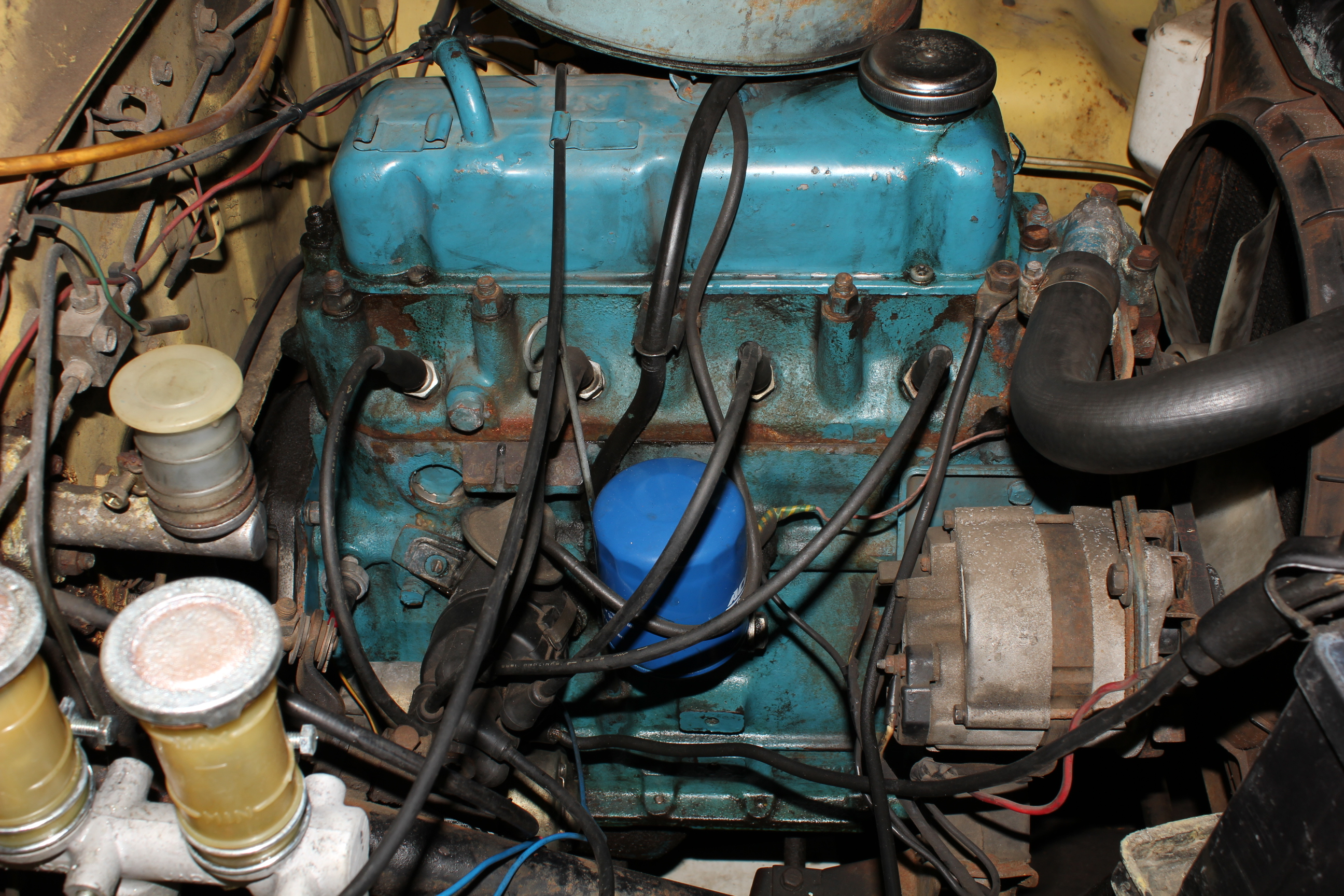

Overview
- Manufacturer: Nissan
- Production: 1965–1982

Layout
- Configuration: Inline-4, inline-6
- Displacement: 1.3 L (1,289 cc); 1.5 L (1,471 cc); 1.6 L (1,567 cc); 2.0 L (1,973 cc)
- Cylinder bore: 73 mm (2.87 in); 78 mm (3.07 in)
- Piston stroke: 77 mm (3.03 in); 78.6 mm (3.09 in); 82 mm (3.23 in)
- Cylinder block material: Cast iron
- Cylinder head material: Cast iron
- Valvetrain: OHV

Combustion
- Fuel system: Carburetor
- Fuel type: Gasoline
- Cooling system: Water-cooled

Output
- Power output: 68–140 PS (50–103 kW)

Chronology
- Successor: Nissan L engine

The Nissan J series is a suite of straight-4 and straight-6 gasoline internal combustion engines produced by Nissan from the 1960s through the 1980s. It is similar to the BMC B-Series engine that was built in Japan under licence as the Nissan 1H before being de-stroked to become the 1.0 L Nissan C and 1.2 L Nissan E engines, but it was not a direct copy.

A version of Volkswagen's two-litre, "JL" five-cylinder engine was used in the (Nissan) Volkswagen Santana with 110–140 PS (81–103 kW) and was called the "J" engine by Nissan, but it shares nothing with the original J20 even though it is also a two-liter engine.

== Straight-4 ==
=== J13 ===
An OHV engine of 1.3 L; 79.3 cu in (1,299 cc), the J13 was used in the 1965-1967 Datsun 411 sedan and wagon (originally only in the sporting "SS" series). Bore and stroke are 73 mm × 77.6 mm (2.87 in × 3.06 in). It appeared on the Datsun 520 and 521 trucks from 1967 to 1969 when it was replaced by the Nissan L engine. Mexican-assembled Bluebird 510s also received the J13 engine. The J13 was rated at 67 PS (49 kW; 66 hp).

=== J15 ===
The J13 was bored out to produce the J15, which was introduced in the Datsun 521 truck in 1969 and saw use in various Nissan pickup trucks like the 620 and 720 in various overseas markets through the 1970s and 1980s. It was also used in sedans such as the 710 and the PA321 Datsun Cabstar. Bore and stroke are 78 mm × 77.6 mm (3.07 in × 3.06 in) for a displacement of 1.5 L (1,483 cc). The J15 produces 77 PS (57 kW; 76 hp). Max torque at 3400 rpm with 12.0 kg.

=== J16 ===
A 1.6 L (1,567 cc) long-stroke iteration of the J15 was built mainly for utility vehicles. Bore and stroke are 78 mm × 82 mm (3.07 in × 3.23 in). This engine was installed by Nissan's Taiwanese partner Yue Loong in several iterations of the Nissan Violet, long after Nissan themselves had stopped using OHV engines in passenger cars.

==== Applications ====
- 1972-1976 Nissan/Datsun Homer, Cabstar T20-series (80 PS [59 kW] at 5,400 rpm)
- Yue Loong Violet 707 - Taiwanese built Nissan Violet, 80 PS (59 kW) SAE at 5,200 rpm
- E23 Urvan (some markets)
- 1972-1976 Nissan Homer T20
- 1979-1982 Nissan Datsun 720

=== J18 ===
The J18 is a 1.8 L engine used in various Nissan models built in Mexico from the mid-1980s until the mid-1990s. Bore and stroke are 80.5 mm × 86.0 mm (3.17 in × 3.39 in), for an overall displacement of 1,751 cc (1.75 L; 107 cu in) and a power output of 89 hp (66 kW) with a Nikki window carburetor.

== Straight-6 ==
=== J20 ===
The J20 is a 2.0 L (1,973 cc) inline-six engine. Bore and stroke are 73 mm × 78.6 mm (2.87 in × 3.09 in). It produces 109 hp (81 kW) and was used in the 1966-1969 Nissan Cedric 130. The J20 is basically a J13 with two extra cylinders, although the stroke is one millimeter longer.

== See also ==
- List of Nissan engines
