= Nissan A engine =

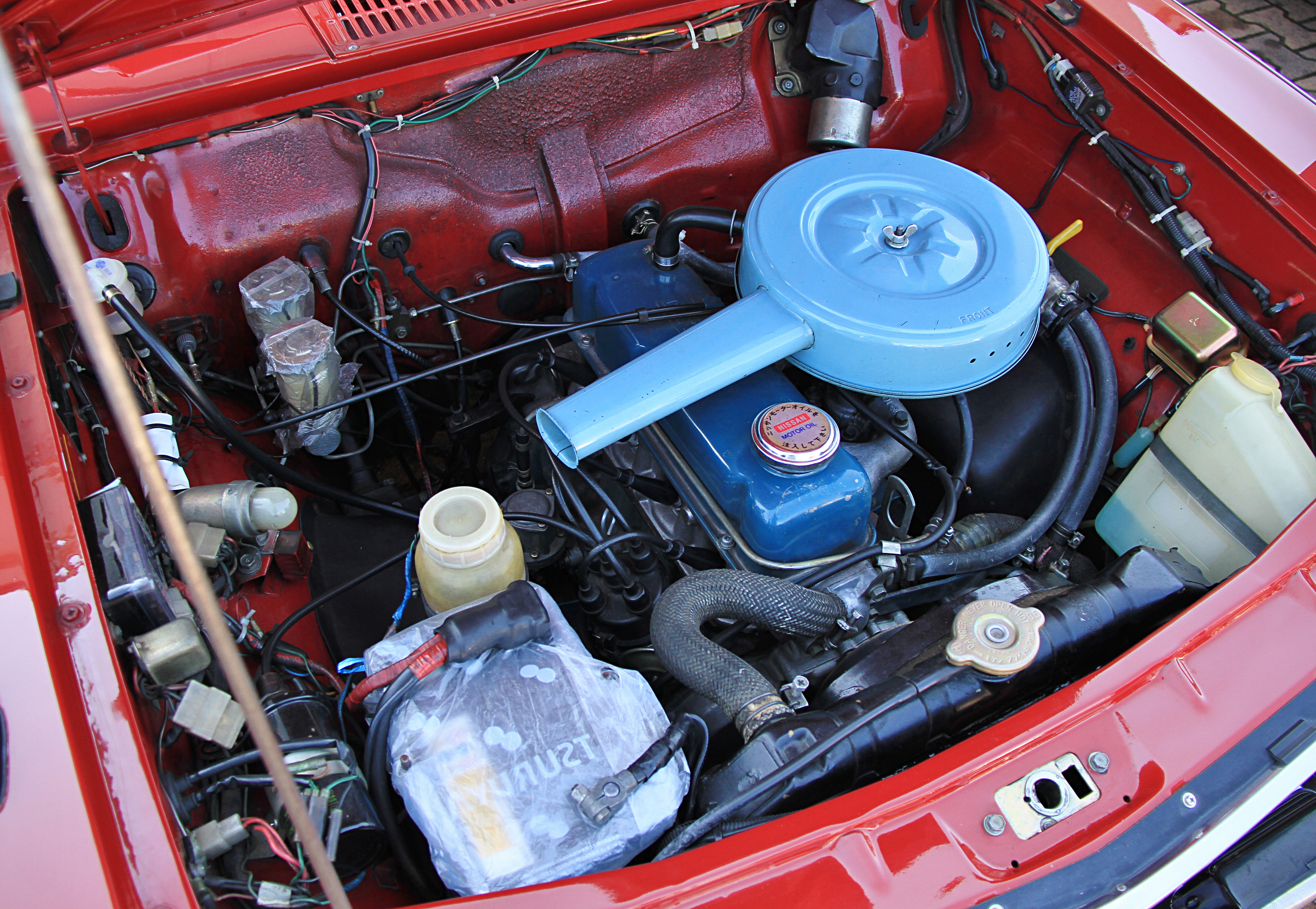
- Nissan A10 engine (1969)

Overview
- Manufacturer: Nissan
- Production: 1967–2009

Layout
- Configuration: Inline-four cylinder
- Displacement: 1.0 L (988 cc); 1.2 L (1,171 cc); 1.2 L (1,237 cc); 1.3 L (1,270 cc); 1.3 L (1,288 cc); 1.4 L (1,397 cc); 1.5 L (1,487 cc)
- Cylinder bore: 73 mm (2.87 in); 75 mm (2.95 in); 76 mm (2.99 in)
- Piston stroke: 59 mm (2.32 in); 70 mm (2.76 in); 77 mm (3.03 in); 82 mm (3.23 in)
- Valvetrain: OHV, 2 valves per cylinder

Combustion
- Fuel system: Carburettor
- Fuel type: Gasoline
- Cooling system: Water-cooled

Output
- Power output: From 59 PS (43 kW; 58 hp) to 92 PS (68 kW; 91 hp)
- Torque output: From 8.3 kg⋅m (81 N⋅m; 60 lb⋅ft)

Chronology
- Predecessor: Nissan C engine / Nissan E engine (OHV)
- Successor: Nissan E engine (OHC)

The Nissan A series of internal combustion gasoline engines have been used in Datsun and Nissan brand vehicles. Displacements of this four-stroke engine family ranged from 1.0-liter to 1.5-liter and have been produced from 1967 until 2009. It is a small-displacement four-cylinder straight engine. It uses a lightweight cast iron block and an aluminum cylinder head, with overhead valves actuated by pushrods.

The Nissan A engine design is a refined, quiet and durable gasoline engine. It appears to be a modern replacement of the earlier iron-headed Nissan C and Nissan E engines and is of similar dimensions. The 1960s A series was an all-new design from newly acquired Aichi Kokuki, and a departure from Nissan's BMC B-Series engine derived designs of the 1950s (Nissan was a licensee of Austin Motor Company technology). A major improvement over the BMC-based designs was locating the camshaft on the right side of the engine rather than the left where the inlet and exhaust ports were located. This meant that the pushrods no longer intruded on the ports, allowing for eight individual ports instead of the original five, and the new engine used an oil pump mounted to the right side of the block rather than behind the rear of the camshaft. As production continued, 1974 and newer A-series engines had different block castings, with relocated motor mount bosses. The A-series engine was also used by India's Premier Automobiles Limited.

== A10: the first A-series engine ==
The A10 is a 1.0-liter (988 cc) engine, released in September 1966 in the 1967 model year Datsun 1000. The A10 featured a three main bearing crankshaft. Bore was 73 mm and stroke was 59 mm (same as the Nissan C engine). With a two-barrel Hitachi carburetor and an 8.5 to 1 compression ratio this engine produced 62 PS (46 kW; 61 hp) at 6000 rpm and 8.5 kg⋅m (83 N⋅m; 61 lb⋅ft). The Datsun 1000 Coupé, introduced in Sept 1968, was equipped with an uprated A10 engine boasting a free flowing dual outlet exhaust manifold with increased compression, now 9 to 1. With a revised carburetor, this engine produced 66 PS (49 kW; 65 hp). Export versions of the A10 as installed in the Datsun 100A produced 59 PS (43 kW; 58 hp) SAE at 6000 rpm and 8.3 kg⋅m (81 N⋅m; 60 lb⋅ft) at 4000 rpm.

A belt-driven SOHC version of the A10 was built as the E10 into the early nineties.

Applications

- 1967–1970 Nissan Sunny (B10, B20; Datsun 1000)
- 1971–1976 Nissan Cherry (E10; Datsun 100A)
- 1974–1978 Nissan Cherry F-II (F10)
- 1978–1981 Nissan Pulsar/Cherry (N10)

== A12 (1200): further refinements ==
The A12 is a 1,171 cc (1.2 L; 71 cu in) engine with a 73 mm (2.9 in) bore, like the previous A10 engine, but with its stroke increased to 70 mm (2.8 in). With five main bearings on a forged steel crankshaft, the engine is extremely smooth and durable. The two-barrel (twin-choke) Hitachi carburettor was significantly improved with the addition of a power valve circuit. In Japanese specs, the original A12 engine with a twin-choke carburettor produced 68 PS (50 kW; 67 hp) at 6000 rpm and 95 N⋅m (9.7 kg⋅m; 70 lb⋅ft) of torque at 3600 rpm. There were also single carb and twin carb versions available.

A special version of the A12 called the "A12 GX" engine, was available (A12GX or A12T for front-wheel drive applications). With twin Hitachi sidedraft carburetors, a longer duration camshaft and 10:1 compression ratio, it delivered 83 PS (61 kW; 82 hp) at 6400 rpm, up over 20 percent from a standard A12 engine. The GX engine was offered in Japanese Domestic Market Nissan Sunny 1200 GX sedans and coupes. The identical specification A12T engine was offered in the front-wheel-drive Nissan Cherry X-1.

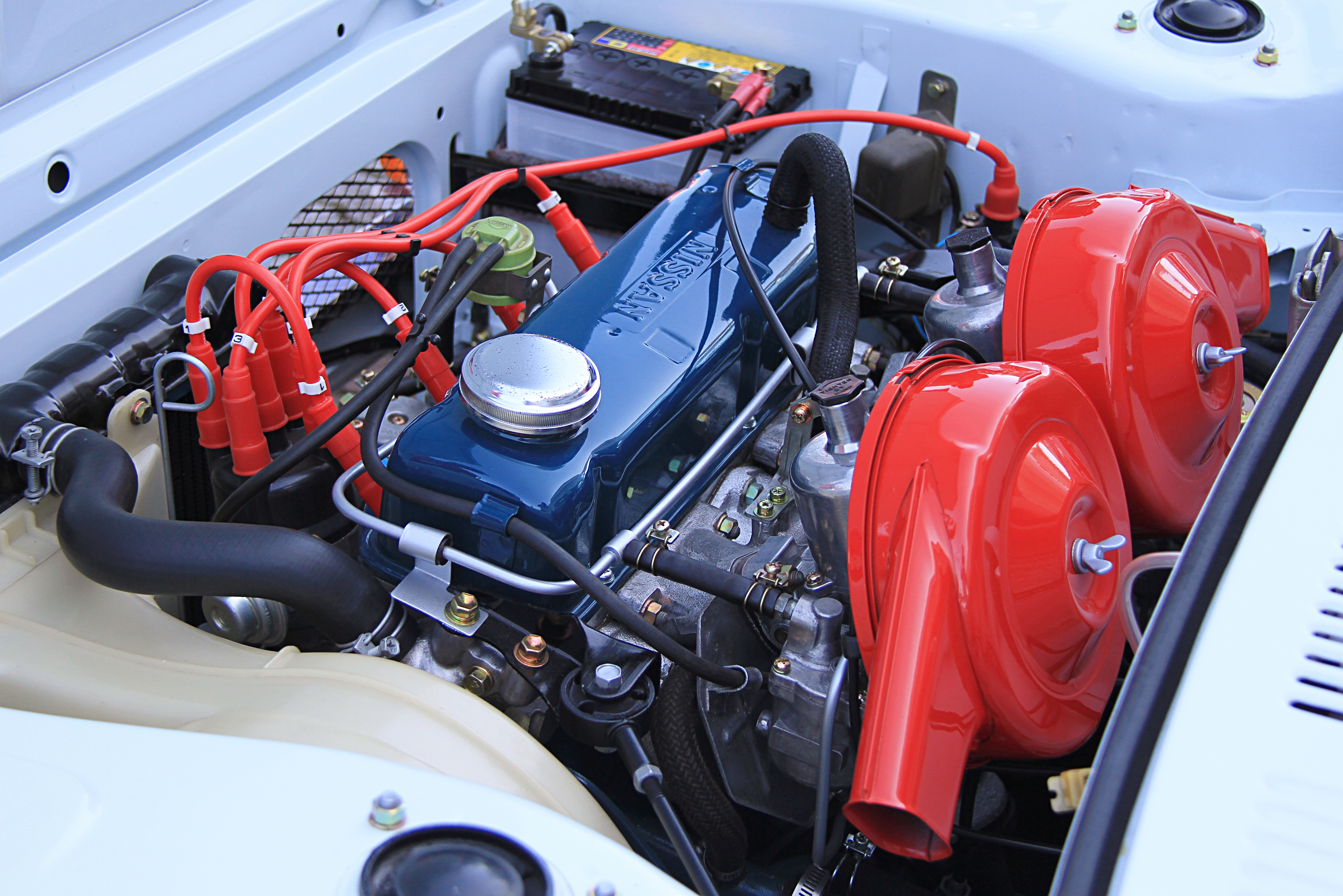
The A12T engine in a Cherry X-1

An overbored version of the A12 was used in period race cars, including Nissan factory (works) racing Sunnys. Many were overbored from the original 73 mm (2.9 in) to 76.76 mm (3.022 in) using Tomei forged pistons for a displacement of 1,296 cc (79.1 cu in), while others used 76 mm (3.0 in) Datsun Competition forged pistons, for a displacement of 1,270 cc (78 cu in). These legendary engines competed in Japan's Touring Sedan (TS) class races against the 1200s archrival Toyota Starlet.

Perhaps the most interesting variety of A series engines was the AY12 engine. This was a special race-only Nissan factory (works) racing version with a crossflow cylinder head.

The AY12 was used in an under 1300-cc competition class with a 76–76.8 mm (2.99–3.02 in) bore diameter. The intake valve was 40–41 mm (1.57–1.61 in) and exhaust valves were 33–34 mm (1.30–1.34 in). The pistons were also a special design and the valve rocker system was different from the standard A12 due to the use of a crossflow layout for the racing engine.

Applications

- 1970–1973 Nissan Sunny B110, and B120 (Nissan Sunny Truck)
- 1971–1973 Nissan Cherry E10 (Datsun 120A)
- 1970 Nissan 270X concept
- 1985-2001 Premier 118NE (Fiat 124)

=== 1974 redesign ===
For the 1974 model year, the A engine was modified, and all subsequent A engines use the new block style. Since there was increasing need for accessories like air conditioning, anti-pollution air pumps and the like, the distributor was moved from the front side of the engine to the middle of the block to make room for these accessories. Additionally, the motor mount positions were moved slightly. Nissan introduced its emission control technology, called NAPS (Nissan NAPS) with the redesign.

This "new" A12 retained the same bore, stroke and most other specifications of the previous A12.

Applications

- 1974–1978 Nissan Sunny B210 (Datsun 120Y) (not used in the US model B-210)
- 1974–1976 Nissan Cherry E10 (Datsun 120A)
- 1977.11-1982 Nissan Sunny B310 (Datsun 120Y) (not used in the US model 210)
- 1974–1995 Nissan Sunny Truck
- 1978–1982 Nissan Pulsar N10 / Nissan Cherry N10 (Datsun 120A)
- 1978–1988 Nissan Vanette (C120) – 64 PS (47 kW; 63 hp) at 5,400 rpm (called Datsun Vanette/Nissan Sunny Vanette/Nissan Cherry Vanette, depending on dealership channel)
- Premier 118NE sedan, made by Premier Automobiles Limited in India

== A12A ==
The A12A is a 1.2-liter (1,237 cc) engine. It used a casting similar to the A12 and same stroke, but used a 75 mm bore (up from 73 mm), for an increase of 66 cc capacity. It too was of an overhead valve design. The A12A also uses a different (stronger) conrod with a larger diameter gudgeon pin.

The A12A shared a common block and crankshaft with the redesigned A12 and A13 engines.

Applications

- 1977.11–1980.11 Datsun Sunny B310 – 70 PS (51 kW; 69 hp) at 6000 rpm
- 1979–1982 "Datsun 210", USA and Canada version of Sunny B310.
- 1974–1979 Nissan Cherry Second generation (F10, F-II)
- 1978–1982 Datsun Cherry Third generation (N10)

== A13 (1974): the first tall-deck A engine ==
The 1974 A13 is a 1.3-liter (1288 cc) engine with 73 mm bore like the A10 and A12 above, but stroke increased to 77 mm, and compression ratio reduced to 8.5:1. This engine features a "tall-block" with a deck height 15 mm (0.59 in) higher than previous A-series engines.

Applications

- 1974 Nissan Sunny Datsun B-210 (USA and Canada)

Making this engine a 75 hp (56 kW). An important fact is that this model only existed in the 1974 model year.

== A13 (1979–1982) – short-deck engine ==
The redesigned A13 is a 1.3-liter engine. It used the same basic block casting as the A12 and same stroke of 70 mm, but used a 76 mm bore for a displacement of 1,270 cc. This engine was also used as the basis for a number of Formula Pacific and Formula 3 race engines.

Applications

- 1980–1982 Nissan Sunny B310

== A14 ==
The A14 is a 1.4-liter (1397 cc) engine produced from the 1975 Model year through 2008. The bore was increased to 76 mm, up from 73 mm of previous A-series engines. Like the previous A13 engine, the A14 is a "tall-block" variant. It was produced in various ratings from 50 to 92 PS (37 to 68 kW).

Submodels included the A14S, which used a twin-choke carburetor. A double-carburetor "GX" version of this engine (A14T) was also available in some markets. A fuel-injected version (A14E) was offered in the Japanese market in the B310 Sunny.

Applications

- 1975–1978 Nissan Sunny B210 (140Y or B-210)
- 1976–1978 Nissan/Datsun F-10
- 1977.11–1982 Datsun Sunny HB310 (aka Datsun 140Y or Datsun 210)
- 1977–1982 Nissan Pulsar N10 (aka Datsun/Nissan Cherry, Datsun 310) 92 PS (JDM)
- 1977.05–1981 Nissan Violet/Auster, 80 PS (JDM)
- 1978–1988 Nissan Vanette (PC120) – 75 PS (55 kW) at 5400 rpm (originally only in 'Coach' passenger versions)
- 1982–2008 Nissan 1400 LDV (model B140. Only sold in South Africa).
- Datsun Forklift models (including turbocharged variant). Replaced the A15 normally aspirated engine due to emission controls implemented in the Asian markets.

== A15 – Stroker motor ==
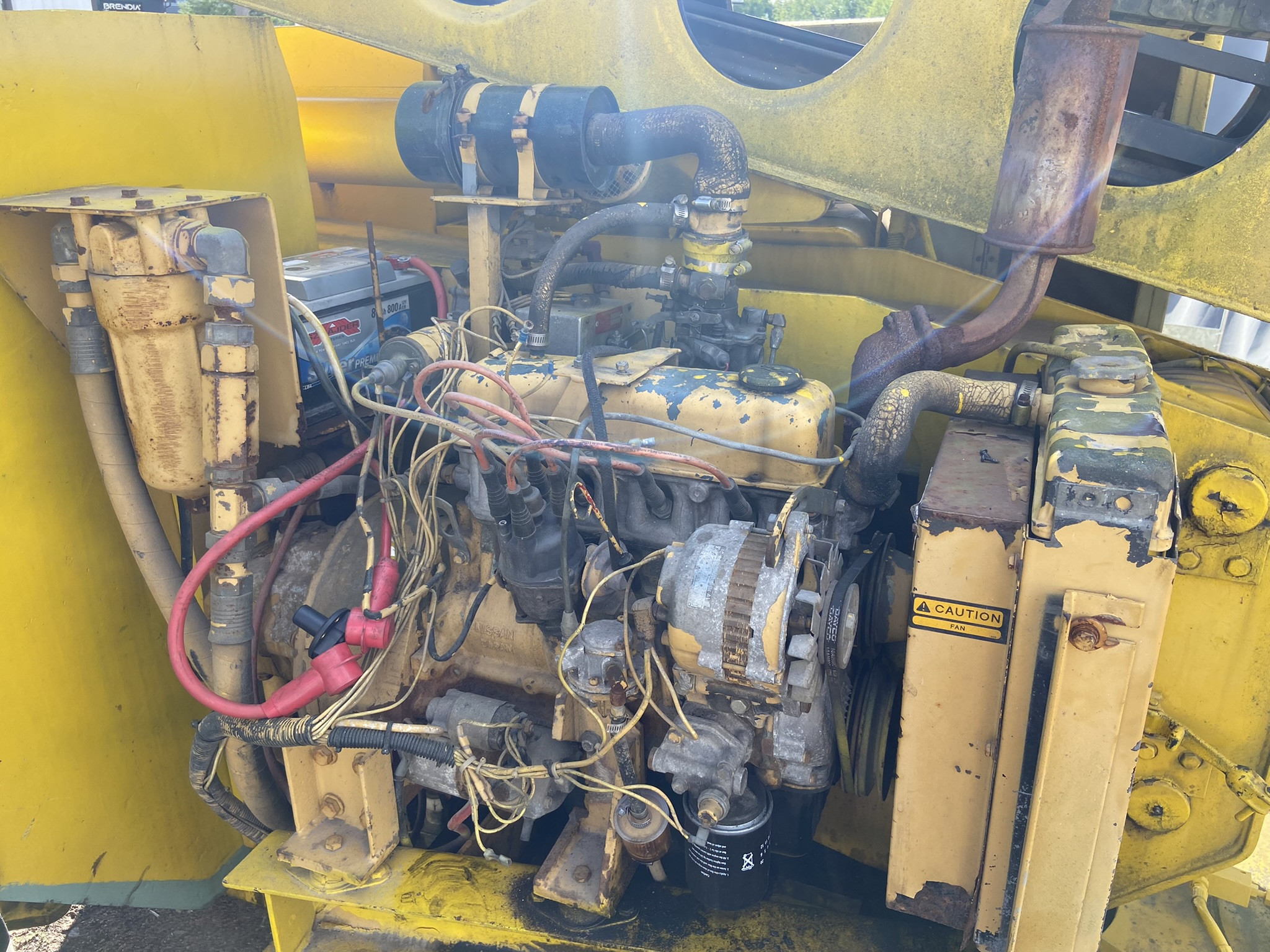
A15 in a Grove-Manlift

The A15 is a 1.5-liter (1,487 cc) engine produced from 1979 till 2009 where it was used in the Malaysian Vanette C22. The stroke was increased by 5 mm from the A14 engine to now measure 82 mm, while the bore remained 76 mm. It produces 80 PS (59 kW; 79 hp). It used only a different block casting number, but retained the same "tall-block" deck height, measurements and BMEP as the A14. In the Nissan B120 Sunny "RoadStar" truck it is capable of 49 mpg (17,3 km/L).

A fuel-injected version of the A15 (A15E) was offered in Asian markets.

Applications

- Nissan Sunny PB310 ("Datsun 210")
- Nissan Cherry F10 ("Datsun F10")
- Nissan B120 Pickup ("RoadStar" and "SportStar") in New Zealand
- 1985-2009 Nissan Vanette C22
- Datsun 310 N10 in United States
- Nissan forklift: Replaced the commercial J15 engine from 1974 to 1978
- 1988-2000 Grove-Manlift AMZ66 and AMZ56 (31kW, 42.5hp)

== See also ==
- List of Nissan engines
