= Nissan Cabstar =

Light commercial vehicles and trucks

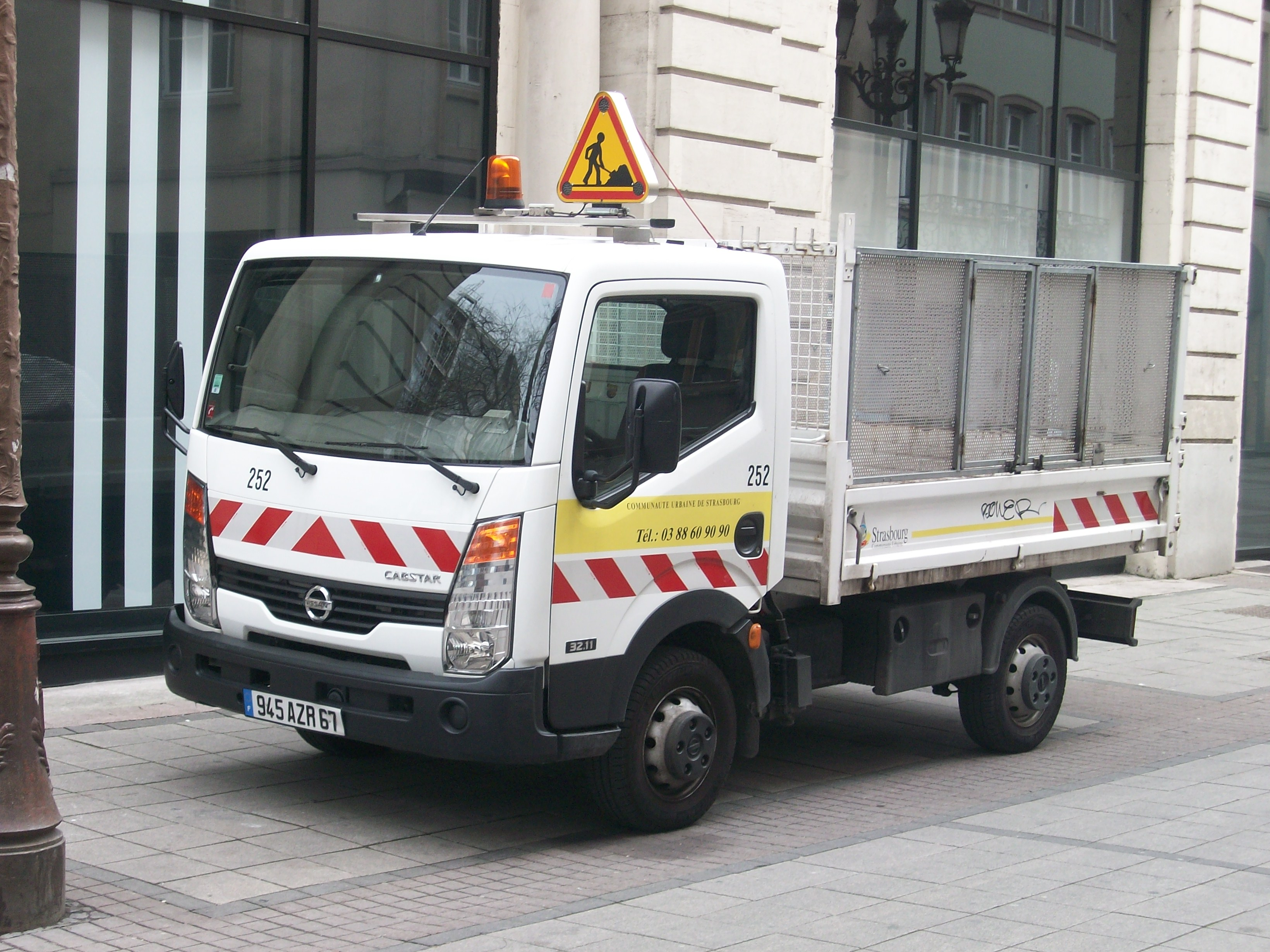
Nissan Cabstar in Strasbourg, France

Nissan Cabstar (kana:日産・キャブスター Kyabusutā) is the name used in Japan for two lines of pickup trucks and light commercial vehicles sold by Nissan and built by UD Nissan Diesel, a Volvo AB (now Isuzu) company and by Renault-Nissan Alliance for the European market. The name originated with the 1968 Datsun Cabstar, but this was gradually changed over to "Nissan" badging in the early 1980s. The lighter 1-1.5 tons range Atlas (kana:日産・アトラス) replaced the earlier Cabstar and Homer, while the heavier Caball and Clipper were replaced by the 2-4 ton range. The Cabstar nameplate has been applied to the Atlas and other Nissan trucks in Europe and certain other export markets. The Cabstar is known also as the Nissan Cabstar, Renault Maxity and Samsung SV110 depending on the location. The range has been sold around the world. It shares its platform with the Nissan Caravan. In spring 2014, Cabstar is now known as NT400.

== First generation (A320; 1968-1976) ==
The first Cabstar (A320) appeared in Japan in March 1968, as a replacement for the earlier Datsun Cablight and Nissan C80. It is a cab-over engine truck and was available either as a truck, light van (glazed van), or as a "route van" (bus). It was exclusive to Japanese Nissan dealerships called Nissan Store.

It uses the 1189 cc Nissan D12 engine with 56 PS (41 kW). After some modifications and the new 1.3 liter J13 engine, with 67 PS (49 kW), in August 1970 the code became A321. The Cabstar underwent another facelift with an entirely new front clip in May 1973. The 1483 cc J15 engine became standard fitment at this time (PA321), with 77 PS (57 kW) at 5200 rpm. The Cabstar was shared with the Prince developed Homer range in Nissan's commercial vehicle lineup, but sold at a different Japanese Nissan dealership. It received a full makeover in January 1976, although the van models were not replaced.

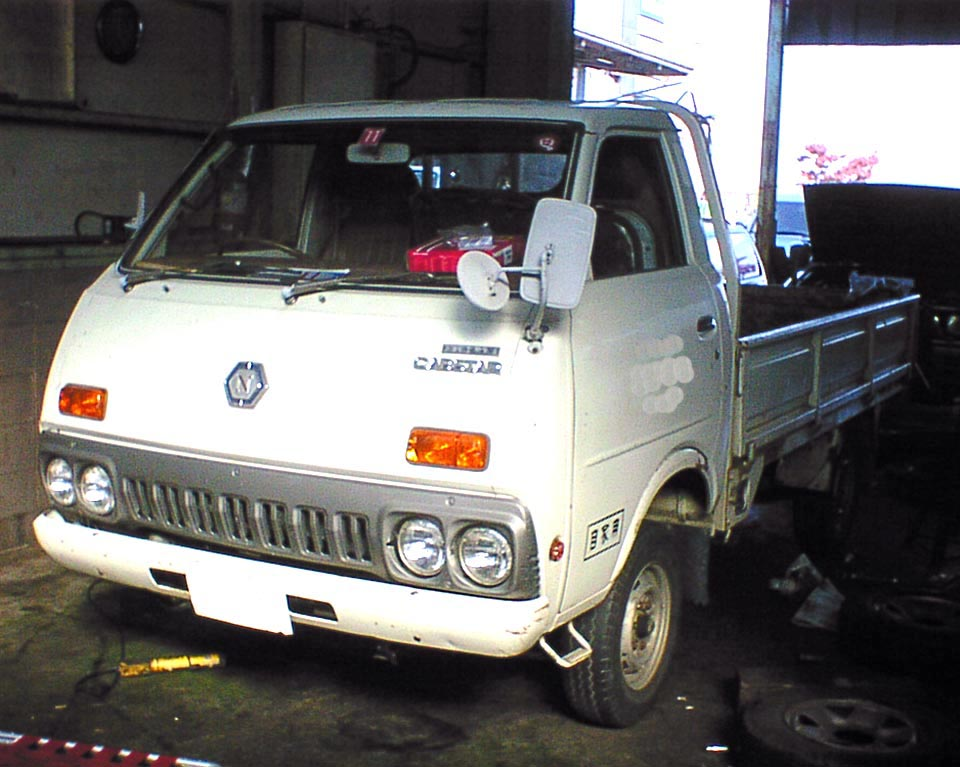
F20-series Nissan Cabstar

== Second generation (F20; 1976-1982) ==
The F20 Nissan Homer, introduced in January 1976, was also sold as the Nissan Datsun Cabstar in Japan. Both ranges were sold with either a 1.5 (J15) or a 2.0 liter (H20) petrol inline-four or with the 2.2 liter SD22 diesel engine.

The F20 received a desmogged engine range in September 1979 and with it a new chassis code, F21. Manufacturing of the heavier range (H40-series) Atlas began in December 1981, while the lighter series Atlas (F22) was introduced in February 1982 - this succeeded both the Homer and Cabstar ranges and the nameplate has not been used in the Japanese market since.

== Europe ==
The Atlas F22 was sold in Europe as the Nissan Cabstar and proved a popular truck in the UK market due to its reliability and ability to carry weight. The H20 two-litre petrol engine was replaced with the new Z20-engine with 90 PS (66 kW), while diesels were also available. From 1990 the range widened and was sold as the Cabstar E. In Taiwan, the F22 continued to be sold as the "Yue Loong Homer". It was also used as recreational truck (motorhome conversions). It proved to be serious competition for the dated Bedford CF and Ford Transit which were its main competitors. The trucks popularity in the African market saw vast majority of the remaining early UK F22 models being exported to Africa.

== Australia ==
Australia was another important market for the Atlas, where it took over after the previous Nissan Caball which was sold there from 1970 to 1981. It was later marketed as the Nissan Cabstar (1984–1992). It was built in Australia using many local components.

== North America ==
The UD 1400 was similar to the Atlas F23 featuring a 4.7 L turbo diesel 175 hp and was available until 2010.

== South Africa ==
The F22-series Atlas was sold in South Africa as the Nissan Cabstar. In 1984 it was available with a 2.8-liter L28 petrol engine producing 92 kW (125 PS; 123 hp), in a shorter 2 1/4-tonne (5,000 lb) model or in a longer 3-tonne (6,600 lb) model.

The Atlas F23 is sold as the UD 35 and UD 40 Series and features a 4.2 L 6-cylinder turbo diesel engine producing 87 kW.

== See also ==
- Nissan Atlas
