= Nissan E engine =

Type of automobile engine

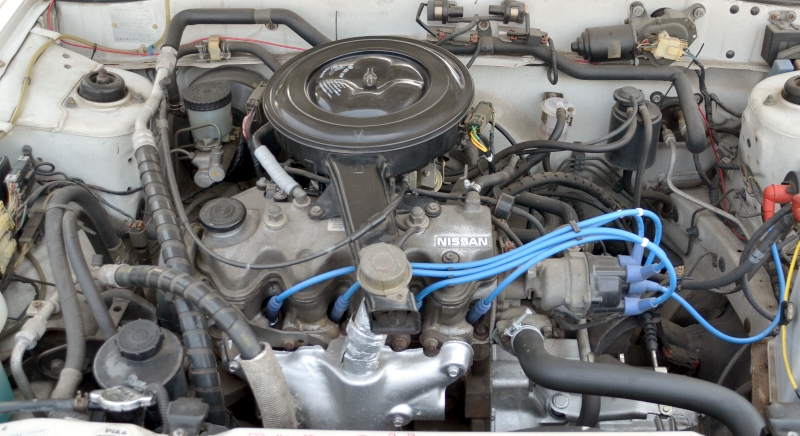

Overview
- Manufacturer: Nissan
- Production: 1958–1988

Layout
- Configuration: Inline 4
- Displacement: 1.0–1.6 L (988–1,597 cc)
- Cylinder bore: 73 mm (2.87 in); 76 mm (2.99 in)
- Piston stroke: 59 mm (2.32 in); 70 mm (2.76 in); 71 mm (2.80 in); 82 mm (3.23 in); 88 mm (3.46 in)
- Cylinder block material: Cast iron
- Cylinder head material: Aluminum alloy
- Valvetrain: OHV, SOHC
- Compression ratio: 8.3:1

Combustion
- Turbocharger: On E15 & E16ST
- Fuel system: Solex carburetor Throttle-body fuel injection
- Fuel type: Gasoline
- Cooling system: Water-cooled

Output
- Power output: 48–115 PS (35–85 kW; 47–113 hp)
- Torque output: 82.3–91.2 N⋅m (60.7–67.3 lb⋅ft)

Chronology
- Predecessor: A series
- Successor: GA series

The Nissan E series name was used on two types of automobile engines. The first was an OHV line used in the late 1950s and throughout the 1960s. The second was an OHC version ranging from 1.0 to 1.6 litres (988 to 1,597 cc) and was produced from 1981 till 1988. It was replaced by the GA engine series.

== First series ==
The first E-series of engines was one of Nissan's earliest homegrown designs, although being essentially an enlargement of the earlier Nissan C engine. It did not use the same nomenclature of the later Nissan engines, with all models sharing the same displacement and simply called "E". It displaced 1.2 L (1,189 cc) from a 73 mm × 71 mm (2.87 in × 2.80 in) bore and stroke. Output is 48 PS (35 kW). This E series was produced from 1958 through the late 1960s, yet not before becoming the basis of the Nissan J engine that was distantly different from the E and earlier C engines (whose roots stem from the Nissan 1H engine, a licence built 1.5 BMC B-Series) yet similar in many ways.

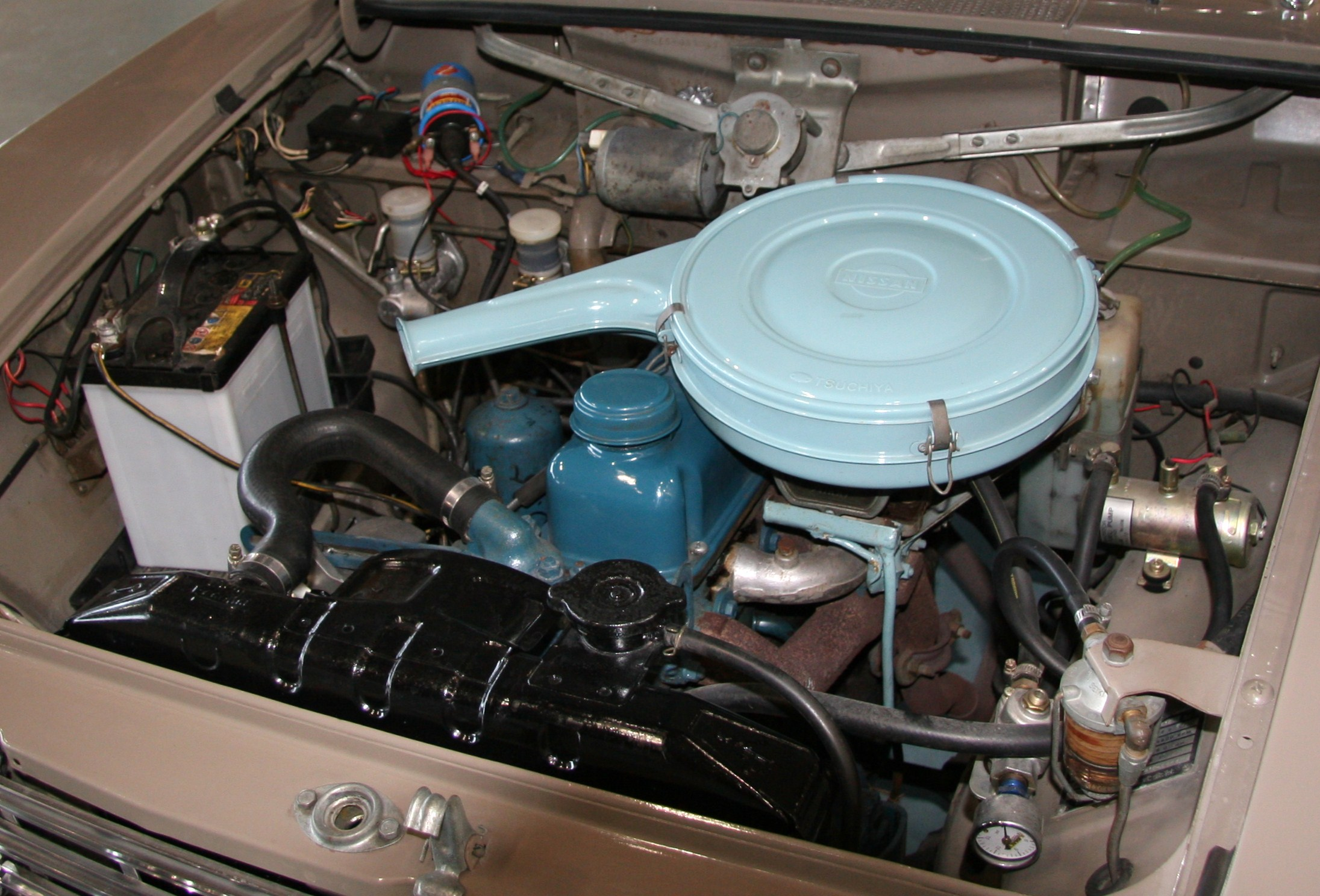
The first series E-1 engine in a Bluebird 410

The first version produced 48 PS (35 kW) and 82.3 N⋅m (61 lb⋅ft) from a single carburetor. A later E-1 version added dual carbs and better cam timing for 60 PS (44 kW) and 91.2 N⋅m (67 lb⋅ft).

Applications:

- E
  - 1958 Datsun Bluebird (211)
  - 1959 Datsun Bluebird (310)
  - 1959 Datsun Truck 222
  - 1960 Datsun Fairlady SP212
- E-1
  - 1960–1962 Datsun Bluebird (311)
  - 1962–1964 Datsun Bluebird (312)
  - 1964–May 1965 Datsun Bluebird (410/411)
  - 1961 Datsun Fairlady SP213
  - 1961 Datsun Pickup 223
  - 1962-1965 Datsun Pickup 320
  - 1968-1969 Datsun Cabstar A320

== Second series ==
The second type of E engines was a single overhead cam design, used to replace the OHV A series. The SOHC head was a new aluminum alloy design fitted to a cast iron block. It was derived from the A series by simply fitting a belt drive pulley to the nose of the crankshaft. The jackshaft being in place of the OHV camshaft still drove the oil pump as before. The E-series engine was first introduced in 1981 on the N10 Pulsar/Cherry series, and shortly afterwards on the B11 Sentra/Sunny models. The E-series was gradually replaced by the GA-series in 1988/89, although it soldiered on in secondary markets such as Southeast Asia. The Malaysian built B11 Nissan Sunny 130Y used the E13 until at least 1996.

=== E10 ===
The E10 displaces 1.0 L (988 cc) from a 73 mm × 59 mm (2.87 in × 2.32 in) bore and stroke, same as for the earlier A10 engine. It was usually fitted to export market Pulsar/Cherrys. The British and Greek markets favoured the smaller E10 as its smaller size meant it avoided higher tax rates at the time.

Applications:

- 1981-1982 Datsun Cherry/100A N10
- 1981-1985 Nissan Sunny B11
- 1982-1986 Nissan Cherry N12
- 1986-1990 Nissan Cherry/Sunny N13 (rebadged Pulsar)

The E10 produces 50 PS (37 kW; 49 hp) at 6000 rpm, with maximum torque of 75 N⋅m (55 lb⋅ft) at 4000 rpm and a 9.0:1 compression ratio. The double- barrel carbureted E10S produces 55 PS (40 kW; 54 hp).

However, due to the way the E10 was designed, the engine featured a smaller bore and stroke than the other E series engine family, where as the E13, E15 and E16 share the same block and bore size, and use different length connecting rods and crankshaft to change displacement. This meant the E10 had a total redesign. The results of this was an engine with a large bore of 73 mm and a very short stroke of just 59 mm. This is known as an over square design, a design that is specially designed to achieve very high engine speeds. The result is that the E10 engines is able to easily exceed the 6500 rpm redline imposed by Nissan (already 500 rpm more than the E13 could manage). E10 engines fitted with performance valve springs and oil pump have been known to rev as high as 8000 rpm.

=== E13 ===
The E13 displaces 1.3 L (1,270 cc) from 76 mm × 70 mm (2.99 in × 2.76 in). The E13 produces 60 PS (44 kW; 59 hp), while the twin-carb E13S produces 67 PS (49 kW; 66 hp), 75 PS (55 kW; 74 hp) JIS in the Japanese market. The numbers have changed considerably, depending on when and where the engines were sold.

Applications:

- Nissan Pulsar (N10) (also sold as the Datsun Cherry)
- Nissan Sunny (B11) (sold as Sunny 130Y in Malaysia into the early 1990s)
- Nissan Pulsar/Cherry (N12)
- 1982.10–1990.10 Nissan AD Van (VB11) (also sold as the Datsun/Cherry/Pulsar AD Van)

=== E15 ===
The E15 displaces 1.5 L (1,488 cc) from 76 mm × 82 mm (2.99 in × 3.23 in). Aside from a single-carbureted version, there was also the twin-carb E15S, fuel injected E15E, and Turbo EFi E15ET. The turbocharged E15ET was discontinued in 1987. It was sold in Japan, Oceania, and in the United States for 1983 and 1984. The E15 is an interference engine.

Outputs (Japan, JIS)

- The E15 produces 75 PS (55 kW; 74 hp) JIS, or 68 PS (50 kW; 67 hp) SAE net in North American specifications
- The E15S produces 85 PS (63 kW; 84 hp)
- The E15E produces 95 PS (70 kW; 94 hp)
- The E15ET produces 115 PS (85 kW; 113 hp)

Claimed power outputs have varied considerably over time and in different markets. The South African variant, for instance, produces 55 kW (75 PS; 74 hp) at 5,500 rpm and 125 N⋅m (92 lb⋅ft) at 2,800 rpm with a single, twin-choke carburetor and practically no emissions equipment.

Applications:

- E15/E15S
  - 1982.10–1990.10 Nissan AD van (VB11)
  - Nissan Cherry (N12)
  - Nissan Prairie (M10)
  - Nissan Pulsar/Cherry/Datsun 310 (N10)
  - Nissan Pulsar/Langley (N12)
  - 1982–1983 Nissan Sentra (B11)
  - Nissan Sunny (B11)
  - Nissan S-Cargo
- E15ET
  - Nissan Pulsar ET/EXA/Cherry/Langley GT/Sunny LePrix Turbo

=== E16 ===
The E16 is a 1.6 L (1,597 cc) engine produced from 1982 through 1988. It has a 76 mm × 88 mm (2.99 in × 3.46 in) bore and stroke. The first generation of this engine used a valve cover that bolted to the rocker shaft studs. This design was replaced in September 1986 with a valve cover that bolted to the head. Note that the E16 is an engine with "interference valve gear".

In North American specs, the E16 produces 69–70 hp (51–52 kW; 70–71 PS) in the "S" (carbureted) variant and 71 hp (53 kW; 72 PS) in the "i" (throttle-body injected) variant. The European E16S (without a catalytic converter), produces 84 PS (62 kW; 84 PS; 83 hp) at 5,600 rpm and 133 N⋅m (98 lb⋅ft) of torque at 3,200 rpm.

Applications:

- Nissan Sentra (B12)
- Nissan Sunny/Hikari (B12)
- Nissan Sentra/Tsuru/V16 (B13)
- Nissan Prairie (M10) (UK-spec)
- Nissan EXA/Pulsar NX (N13)
- Nissan Pulsar (N13)

=== E16ST ===
Produced in Mexico from 1987-1989, used in the Ninja Turbo and Hikari Turbo. Nissan adapted the turbocharger from the E15ET to the E16 engine using a Solex 32 DIS pressurized carburetor (same as the Renault 5 GT Turbo) with a new air pressure system using a fuel regulator and a module to control solenoids which were connected to the vacuum and pressure ports of the carburetor. It produced around 93 hp (69 kW; 94 PS) at almost 6 psi (0.41 bar). The compression ratio of the engine was 8.3:1. The head gasket and the head were the same as the E15ET, with better air flow than the NA heads.

Applications:

- Nissan Ninja Turbo (1987)
- Nissan Hikari Turbo (Sunny B12 Coupé, 1988-1989)

== See also ==
- List of Nissan engines
- Tokyu Kogyo Kurogane
