= Prince Homer =

Discontinued commercial vehicle

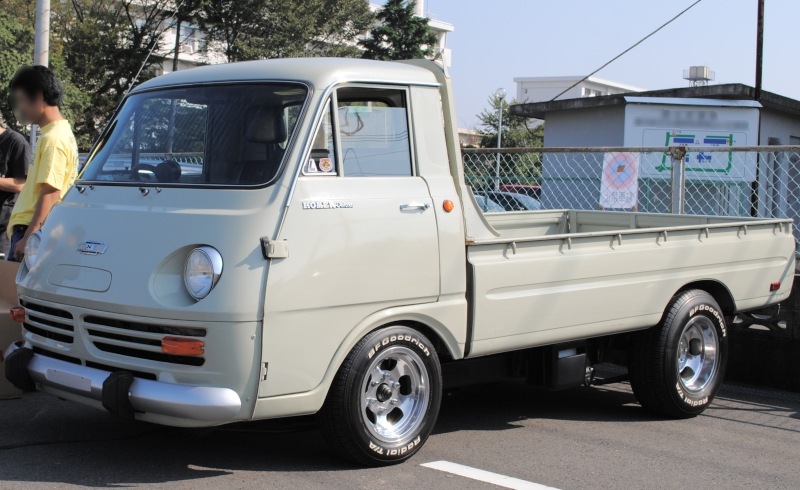
Nissan Homer T641

The Prince Homer was a small commercial vehicle manufactured by the now integrated Prince Motor Company. It was available as a van, called the Homy, a double cab, or regular cab truck. The first model was known as the T64, and was sold as the Prince Homer or PMC T64. The T640 was introduced in 1966 and was sold as a Nissan (without any modifications aside from badging) due to Prince merging with Nissan. It was shared with the Nissan Cabstar which was sold at Nissan Store Japanese dealerships. Production of the T640 ended in 1968. The Homer was exclusive to Japanese Nissan dealerships called Nissan Prince Store, when Prince was merged with Nissan in 1966. The Homer name was discontinued in 1982, while the Cabstar name remained when Nissan refocused Nissan Prince Store vehicles as private purchase products.

The T641 Homer was introduced in 1968 and the slotted grille was replaced with a new 'cat-whiskers' grille. It was rebadged as the Nissan Homer for the Japanese domestic market, and was marketed in Europe and Australia as the Datsun Homer. There was also a Van version, codenamed V641. While the T641 was in production, a 1.25 ton version was built, called the T642. Unlike the T641, the T642 was not available in a van version. The Homer was sold in Taiwan by Yue Loong, originally as the Yue Loong YLN-251.

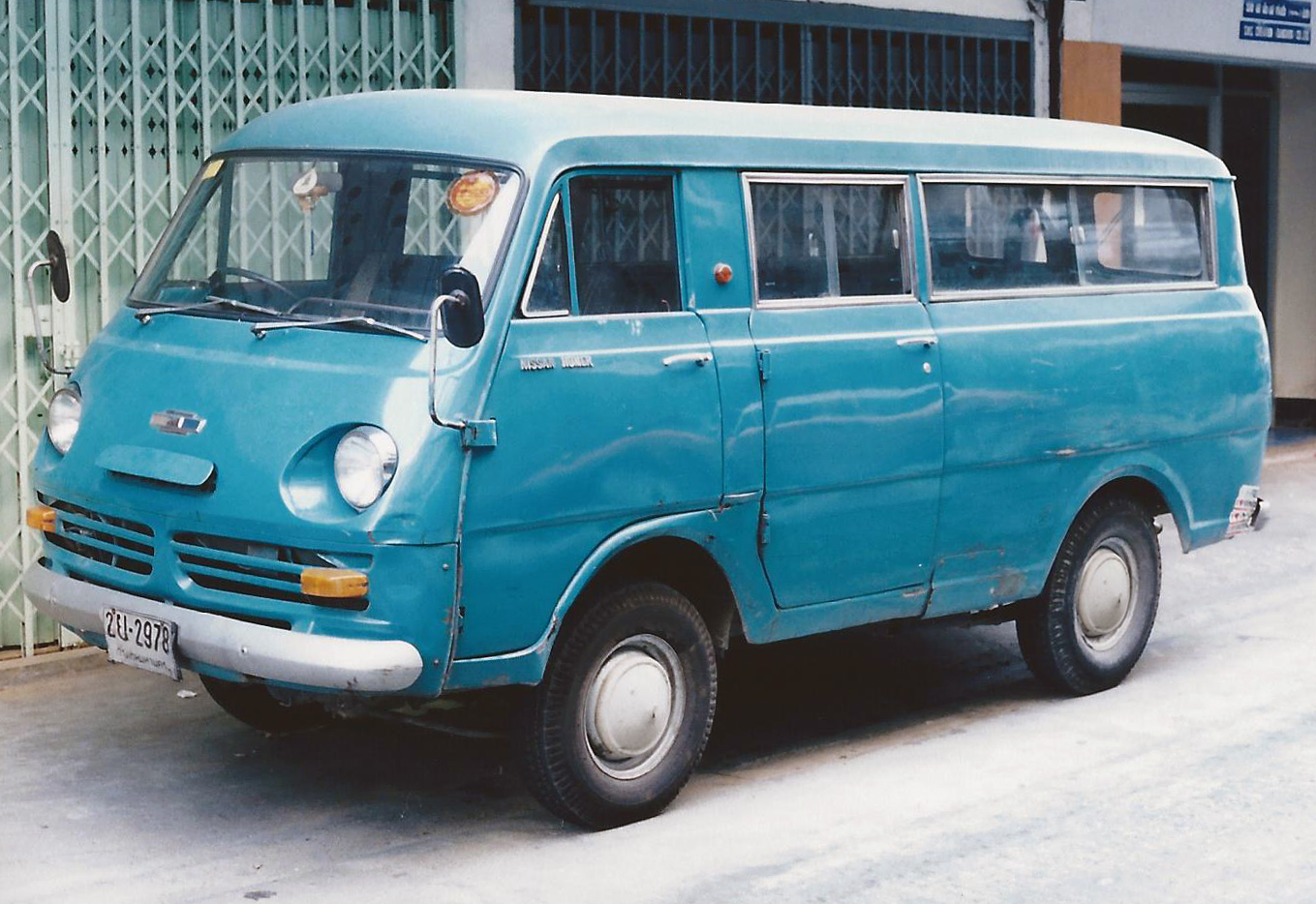
Nissan Homer V641 (Thailand)

== Changes ==
The T20 Homer was introduced in 1972, replacing the T641. The T20 used the same grille as the previous model, but the front signal indicators were taller. T20 production ended in 1976. The final Homer, the F20, was produced from 1976 to 1982 and had all-new bodywork. In September 1979 the F21 was introduced, the new model could pass the 1979 emissions standards and had also received a light facelift. The F20 version was also sold as the Nissan Cabstar in Japan (Datsun Cabstar abroad). Production ended in February 1982, when the Homer line was subsumed into Nissan's own new light truck, the F22 Nissan Atlas. Use of the Homer nameplate continued in Taiwan by Yue Loong on the F22 Atlas and on the Nissan Caravan E23 minibus ("Homer 747").

== Specifications ==
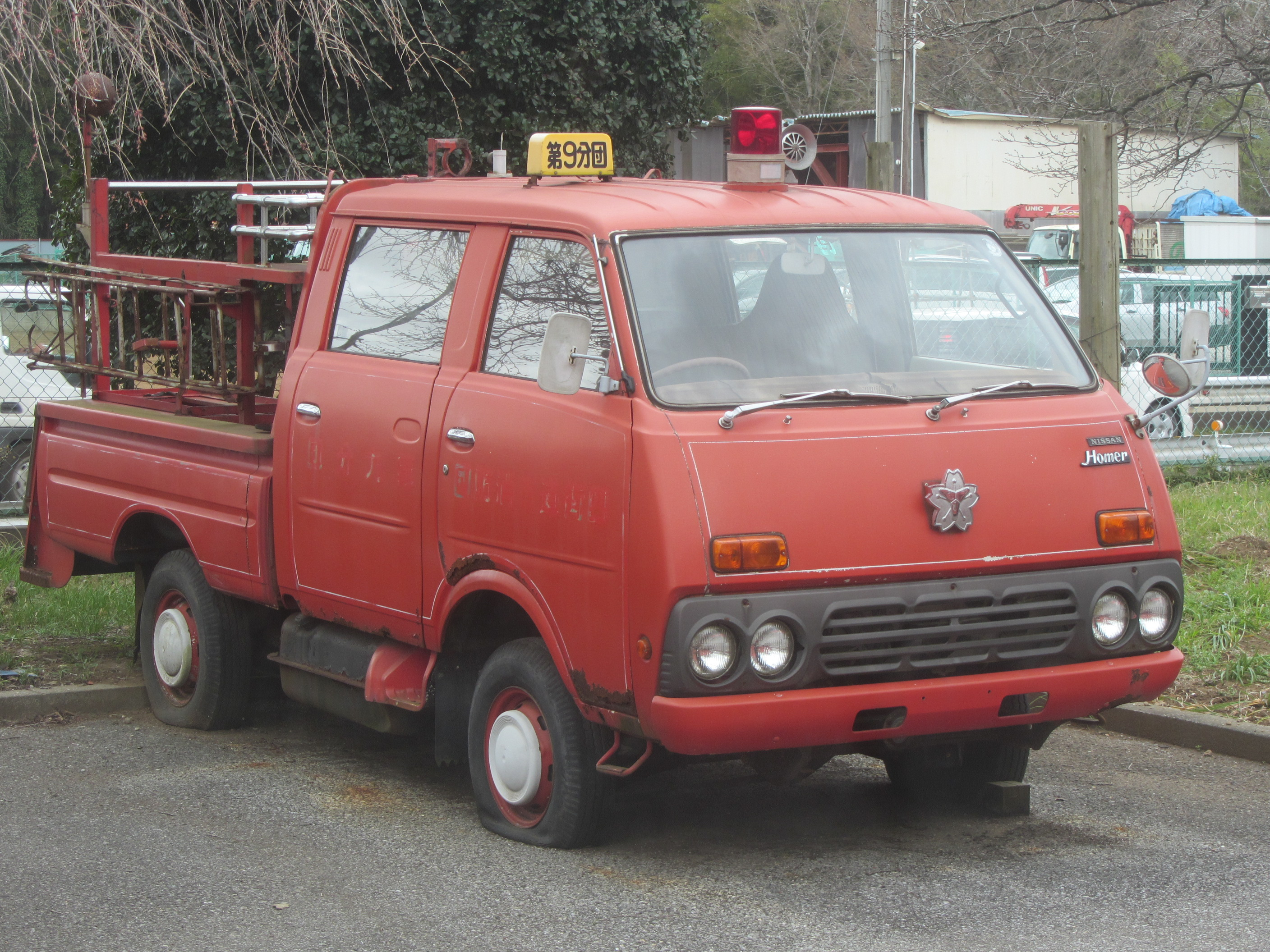
Nissan Homer (F20)

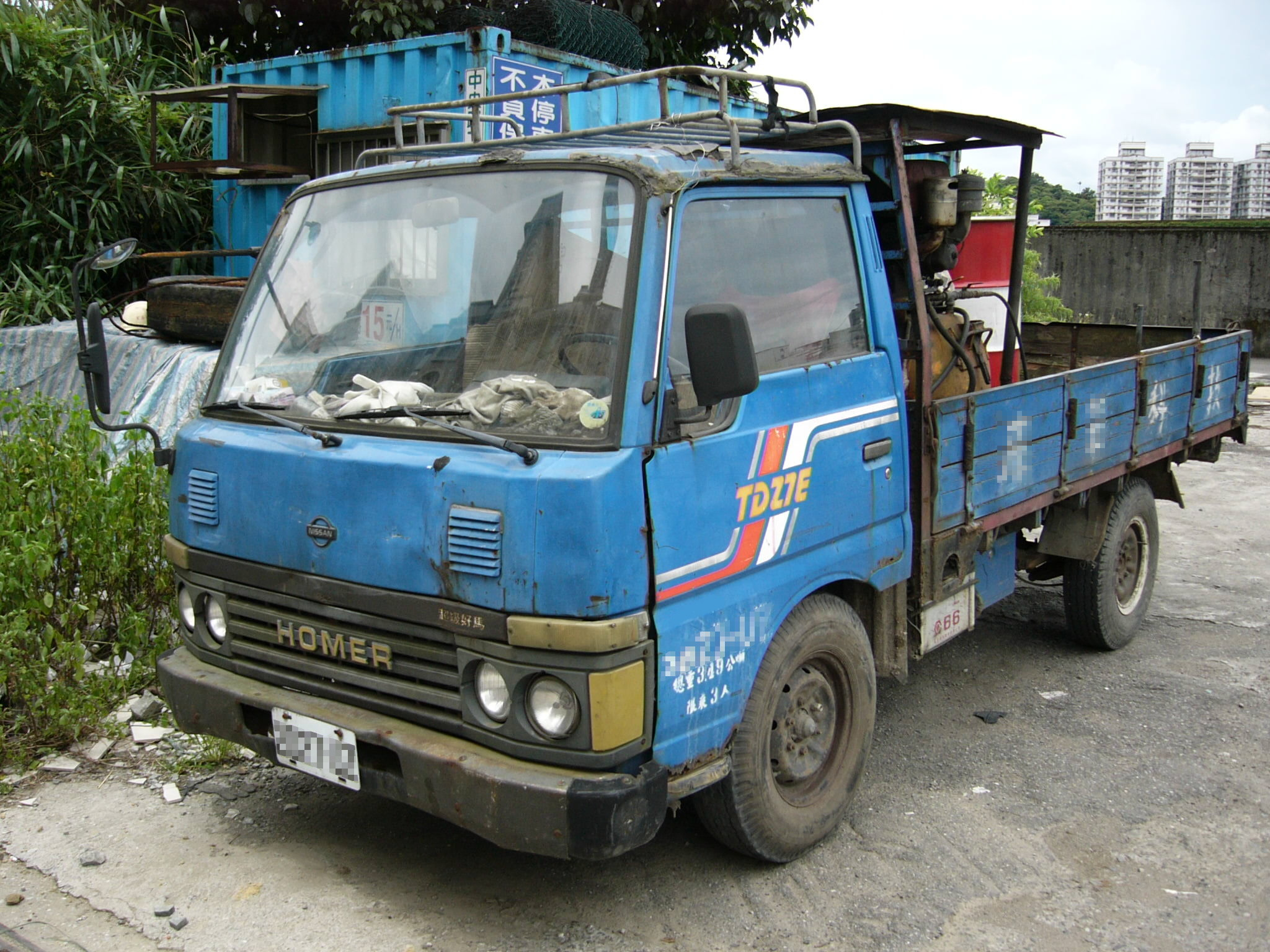
Taiwanese Nissan Homer (F22) - labelled Atlas or Cabstar in most markets

The Homer T640 was first fitted with the 1,484 cc OHV G1 engine found in the Prince Skyline 1500. In 1967, after the Nissan-Prince merger, it was refitted with a single carburettor version of the Datsun Fairlady's 1,595 cc in-line four R16 engine. The "T20" model produced from 1973 to 1976 was powered by the J15 engine (1,483 cc) or the J16 engine (1,567 cc). The "PF20" model with a 1,982 cc H20 engine was produced from 1976 to 1981, and the final model, the PF21, was produced from 1980 to 1982.

Model	Engine	bhp output	Engine capacity
T64/T640	G-1 (GA-4)	73 hp	1484 cc
T641	R16	81 bhp	1595 cc
T20	J16	81 hp	1567 cc
PF20, 21	H20		1982 cc
