= Nissan C engine =

Overview
- Manufacturer: Nissan Motors
- Also called: Stone engine
- Production: 1957-1964

Layout
- Configuration: Inline-four
- Displacement: 1.0 L (988 cc)
- Cylinder bore: 73 mm (2.9 in)
- Piston stroke: 59 mm (2.3 in)
- Cylinder block material: Cast iron
- Cylinder head material: Cast iron
- Valvetrain: OHV
- Valvetrain drive system: Chain
- Compression ratio: 8.0:1

Combustion
- Fuel system: Carburetor
- Fuel type: Gasoline
- Cooling system: Water-cooled

Output
- Power output: 37 hp (28 kW)
- Torque output: 64.7–66.4 N⋅m (47.7–49.0 lb⋅ft)

Chronology
- Predecessor: Datsun sidevalve engine
- Successor: Nissan E engine / Nissan A engine

The Nissan C-series was an inline-four automobile engine produced by Nissan from 1957 to 1964. It displaced 1.0 L (988 cc) and produced 37 hp (28 kW) and 47.7 to 49 lb⋅ft (64.7 to 66.4 N⋅m). It was a pushrod engine and used single or dual-26 mm carburetors.

The C engine was derived from the 1.5 L (1,489 cc) Nissan 1H engine, which was itself a license-built version of the 1.5 BMC B-series engine that used a 73 mm (2.87 in) bore and 89 mm (3.50 in) stroke. To create the C engine, Nissan, advised by American engineer Donald Stone (formerly of Willys-Overland), reduced the stroke of the 1.5 engine from 89 to 59 mm (3.50 to 2.32 in). The resultant C1 engine was called the "Stone engine" in his honor. When the capacity was later increased to 1.2 L by an increase of stroke from 59 to 71 mm (2.32 to 2.80 in), it was called the Nissan E engine.

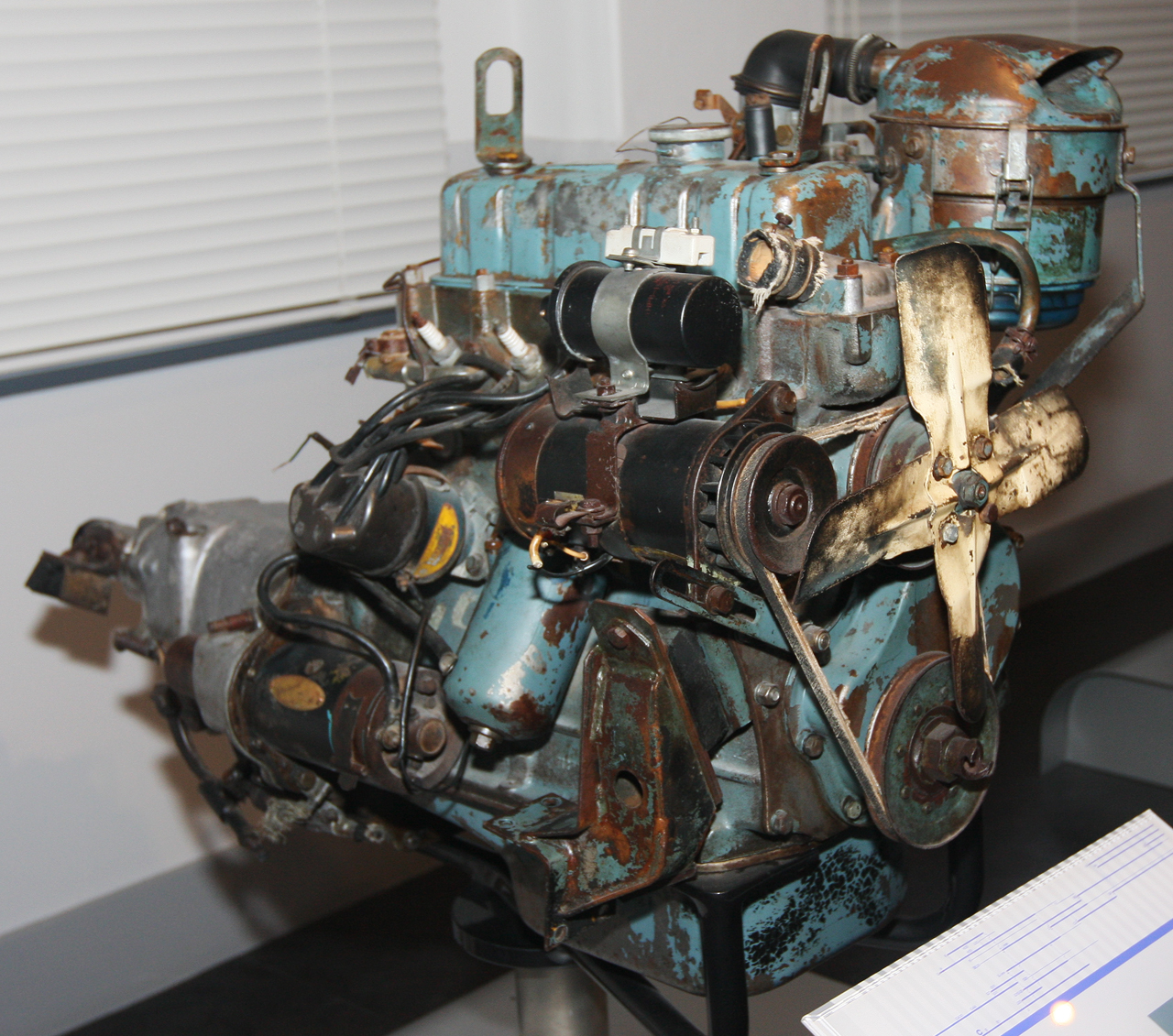
A 1957 vintage Nissan C engine.

The Nissan C engine was replaced by the Nissan A engine in the 1967 Nissan Sunny B10. Its 1-litre A10 unit used the same 73 mm × 59 mm (2.87 in × 2.32 in) bore and stroke as the C engine.

== Applications ==
- 1957-1959 Datsun 210/211
- 1957-1960 Datsun 220/221/222 Truck
- 1959-1960 Datsun S211
- 1959-1963 Datsun Bluebird 310
- 1963-1964 Datsun Bluebird 410

== See also ==
- List of Nissan engines
