= Nissan Skyline =

Series of automobiles manufactured by Nissan

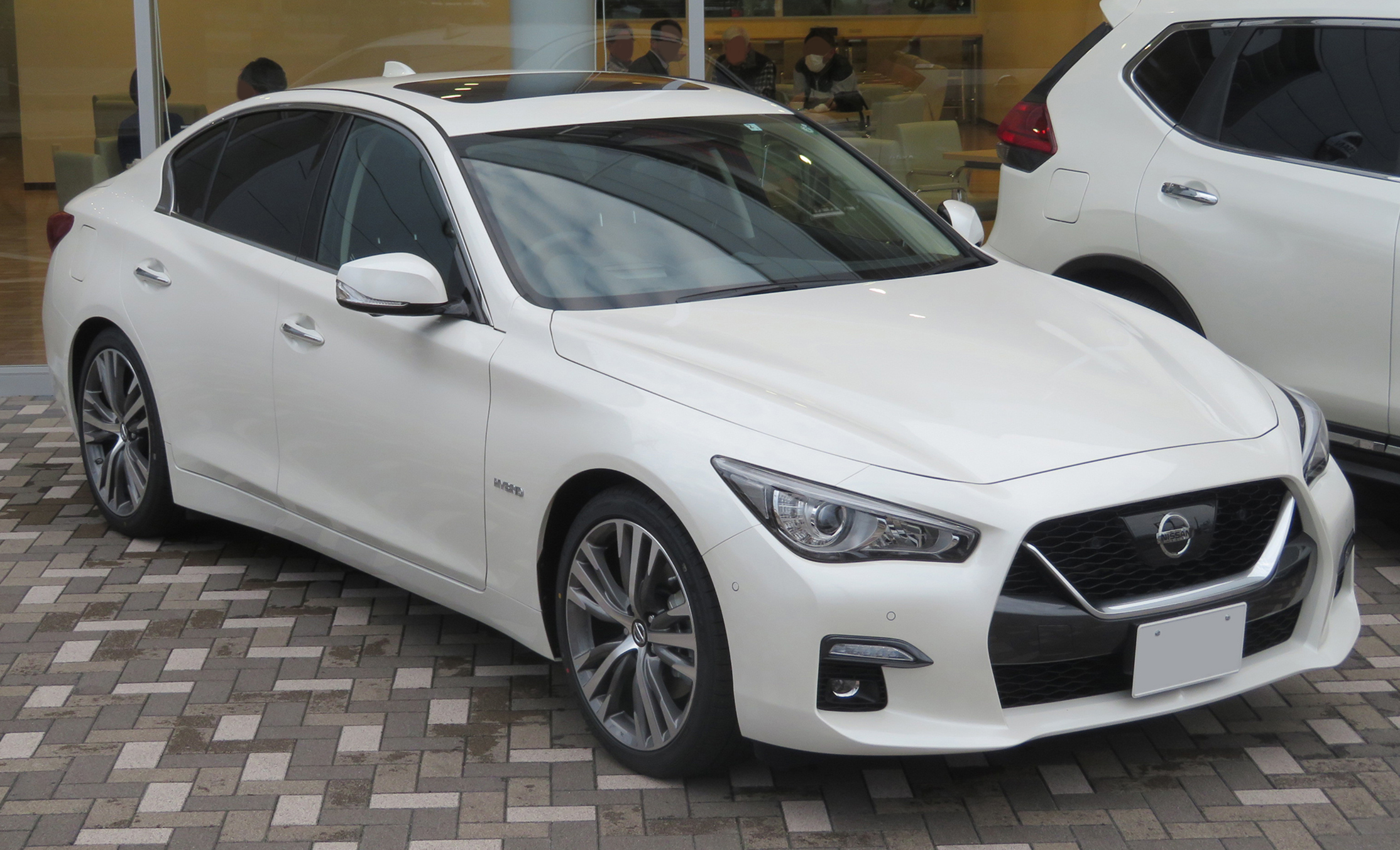
- 2019 Nissan Skyline Hybrid GT Type SP (HV37, Japan)

Overview
- Manufacturer: Nissan; Prince (1957–1968)
- Also called: Prince Skyline (1957–1968); Datsun K Series (1968–1983); Infiniti G Line (2001–2014); Infiniti Q50 (2014–2024, 2027)
- Production: 1957–present

Body and chassis
- Class: Compact car (1957–1981); Mid-size car (1981–2002); Compact executive car (2001–present)
- Layout: Front-engine, rear-wheel-drive (1957–present); Front-engine, four-wheel-drive (1989–present)
- Related: Nissan Laurel (1968–2002); Nissan Skyline GT-R (1969–1973, 1989–2002)

Chronology
- Predecessor: Prince Sedan

The Nissan Skyline (Japanese: 日産・スカイライン, Hepburn: Nissan Sukairain) is a brand of automobile originally produced by the Prince Motor Company starting in 1957, and then by Nissan after the two companies merged in 1966. After the merger, the Skyline and its larger counterpart, the Nissan Gloria, were sold in Japan at dealership sales channels called Nissan Prince Store.

The Skyline was largely designed and engineered by Shinichiro Sakurai from inception, and he remained a chief influence of the car until his death in 2011.

Skylines are available primarily in either coupé or sedan body styles, plus station wagon, crossover, convertible and pickup/sedan delivery body styles. The later models are most commonly known by their trademark round brake and tail lights. The majority of Skyline models are rear-wheel drive, with part-time all-wheel drive being available since the debut of the eighth-generation Skyline (R32).

While not distributed in the United States until its importation as the Infiniti G-series in the early 2000s (the first generation Prince Skyline was imported, but sold poorly), the Skyline's prominence (particularly for the GT-R variant) in video games, movies and magazines (including The Fast and the Furious, Initial D, Shakotan Boogie, Tokyo Xtreme Racer, Wangan Midnight, Need for Speed, Forza, Driving Emotion Type-S, Test Drive, Gran Turismo and Real Racing 3) resulted in many such cars being brought in as grey import vehicles there, and makes up a large amount of second-hand Japanese car imports to Europe and North America.

Starting with the third-generation Skyline (C10) and up to the tenth-generation Skyline (R34), the chassis, suspension and some of the engines were shared with the luxury-oriented longer wheelbase Nissan Laurel. When the former Prince factory at Musashimurayama closed in 2002 (coinciding with the discontinuation of the Laurel that same year), the Skyline used the then-new FM platform that was shared with the 350Z starting with the eleventh-generation Skyline (V35).

The eleventh-generation Skyline (V35) was another major turning point for the nameplate, as it dropped some of the previous generation Skyline's trademark characteristics such as the straight-six engine (replaced with a V6) and turbocharging (reintroduced in the thirteenth-generation/V37 model), and eventually separated the GT-R into its own line. Nissan decided to retain the Skyline for the luxury-sport market segment formerly held by the Laurel, while its platform-mate, the 350Z, revived the Z line of pure sports cars. The V35 was the first Skyline made for export to North America, being sold under Nissan's luxury marque Infiniti as the G35 in 2002. The Skyline (V36/J50) is sold in Europe, North America, South Korea, Taiwan, and the Middle East as the Infiniti G37 and EX respectively.

As of 2024, the Skyline is the only remaining sedan in Nissan's Japanese lineup following the discontinuation of both the Fuga and Cima in 2022.

The Skyline logo used since the V35 series.

== First generation (Prince Skyline, 1957) ==
First generation; Prince Skyline
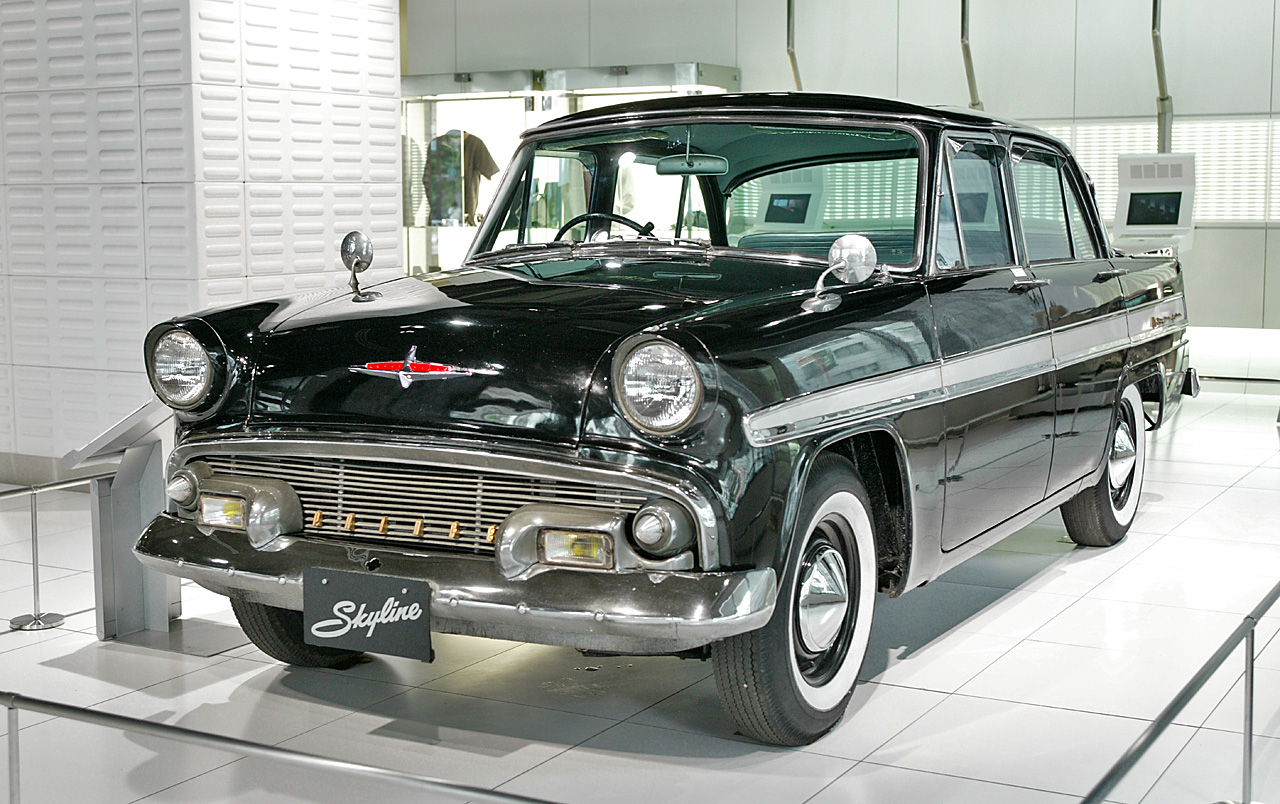
- Prince Skyline ALSID-1

Overview
- Model code: ALSI; BLSI; S21; R21; BLRA-3
- Production: April 1957 – November 1963; 33,759 units sold
- Assembly: Japan: Mitaka
- Designer: Takuya Himura; Giovanni Michelotti (Skyline Sport BLRA-3)

Body and chassis
- Body style: 4-door sedan; 5-door delivery van; 2-door coupe; 2-door convertible
- Layout: Front-engine, rear-wheel-drive
- Related: Prince Skyway; Prince Gloria BLSI; Prince Miler

Powertrain
- Engine: 1.5 L GA-30 I4 (1957–1959); 1.5 L GA-4 I4 (1959–1961); 1.9 L GB-4 I4
- Transmission: 3-speed manual; 4-speed manual

Dimensions
- Wheelbase: 2,535 mm (99.8 in)
- Length: 4,280–4,380 mm (168.5–172.4 in) (ALSI/BLSI); 4,475 mm (176.2 in) (S21); 4,650 mm (183.1 in) (BLRA)
- Width: 1,675 mm (65.9 in) (ALSI/BLSI); 1,695 mm (66.7 in) (BLRA); 1,780 mm (70.1 in) (S21)
- Height: 1,385–1,410 mm (54.5–55.5 in) (BLRA); 1,535 mm (60.4 in)
- Curb weight: 1,265–1,340 kg (2,788.8–2,954.2 lb) (ALSI/BLSI); 1,340–1,350 kg (2,954.2–2,976.2 lb) (BLRA); 1,340–1,365 kg (2,954.2–3,009.3 lb) (S21)

Chronology
- Predecessor: Prince Sedan

=== ALSI-1 series ===
The first Skyline was introduced on 24 April 1957, at the Takarazuka Theater, in Hibiya, Tokyo, for Fuji Precision Industries, marketed as a luxury car. It featured a 1.5 L (1,482 cc) GA-30 engine (also known as FG4A-30) producing 44 kW (60 hp) at 4,400 rpm, which was previously used in the prototype Subaru 1500, Subaru's first car. It used a de Dion tube rear suspension and was capable of 140 km/h (87 mph). The car weighed around 1,300 kg (2,900 lb). Skylines were produced as four-door sedans and five-door station wagons. Two models were available: the ALSIS-1 standard and the ALSID-1 Deluxe. The ALSI-1's appearance seems to be influenced by 1950s American cars, this drew criticism as when it was shown at European auto shows, it was accused of plagiarising the Simca Ariane, which was released at the same time. the car featured rear tail fins, chrome molding and two-tone paint.

The ALSI-1 generation was sold in the United States starting in 1959, but did not sell well, and remain extremely rare. In 2020, a 1960 left-hand-drive model reappeared in an Idaho junkyard.

==== ALSIS-1 ====
The ALSIS-1 standard model featured a grille with a large center bar with six vertical slats above it. The side strips ran straight from the rear of the car to the front doors, where it dipped into a V-shape, widening and kicked upwards until it hit the front of the car. The side badge said "Skyline".

==== ALSID-1 Deluxe ====
The ALSID-1 Deluxe featured a different grille compared to the standard model. The large center bar was absent and instead a pair of fog lights are mounted just inside of the front turn signals. Between the fog lights "PRINCE" is spelled out in individual gold letters. A painted side strip, surrounded by a chrome strip ran horizontally the length of the car, widening from front to back. On this side strip was the side badge, which said "Skyline Deluxe".

The Skyline also spawned the ALPE double cab pickup truck and the ALVE delivery van, both marketed as the Skyway.

=== ALSI-2 series ===
The ALSI-2 series was released in October 1959 and was nearly identical to the ALSI-1 series except for the engine. Higher quality fuel allowed for an increase in compression and a power increase to 70 hp (71 PS). This new engine was designated the FG4A-40 (this engine was also known as the GA-4).

The ALSI-2-1 series was released in February 1960. The Deluxe, along with the commercial variants, were updated with quad headlights (the standard model retained the twin headlights). The side strip design was changed on standard models; the V-shape in the side strip was moved from the front doors to the rear doors. On Deluxe models the side strip design remained the same. The standard model gained quad headlights in September 1960 with the release of the ALSI-2-2 series.

=== BLSI-3 series ===
The BLSI-3 series was released in May 1961. The 1500 engine used in the ALSID Deluxe was dropped and instead used the 91 hp (92 PS) 1.9L GB-4 (also known as FG4B-40) OHV four-cylinder engine from the Gloria. The BLSI series was otherwise identical to the ALSI series, except for a "1900" badge on the side. The standard model received the new engine in October 1961.

Commercial variants remained available, also equipped with the new engine.

=== S21 series ===
The S21 series was released in September 1962. It was in production until November 1963. The front end was redesigned in an attempt to update the look of the car. The result was rather unsuccessful as the car now looked like a 1950s body with a 1960s front end. The S21 continued to use the 1.9L GB-4 engine.

The 3-door van was dropped and replaced with a 5-door station wagon; a double cab pickup truck remained available.

==== BLRA-3 Skyline Sport ====
The S21 Deluxe-based Skyline Sport featured hand-built Michelotti bodies in stylish coupe and convertible versions. These cars used the 1.9 L GB-4 engine from the S21D. While only a few hundred were built, Prince Motors had a very aggressive product placement group and they can be seen (along the company's mainstream models) in many Toho films of the early 1960s. The canted headlights reflected a similar appearance on the late 1950s through early 1960s Lincoln Continental, Buick, and Chrysler 300. The appearance is similar to the 1960s Lancia Flavia and Triumph Vitesse as Michelotti did contribute to Lancia vehicles during this time; Giugiaro's design of the short-lived Gordon Keeble GT was similarly influenced. Being the first sports-focused model, the Skyline Sport foreshadowed the Skyline GT-R sub-range; its luxurious appearance would later be implemented in its future platform-mate twin, the Laurel.

Prince Skyline

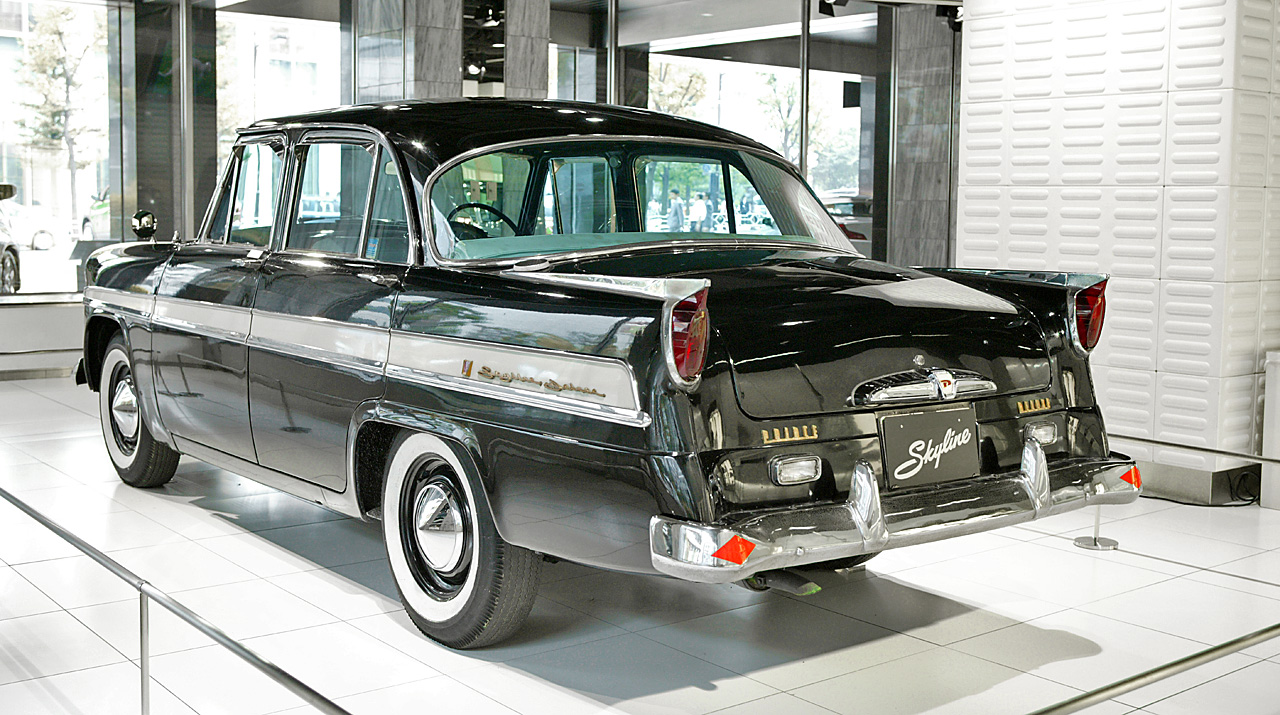
Prince Skyline ALSID-1

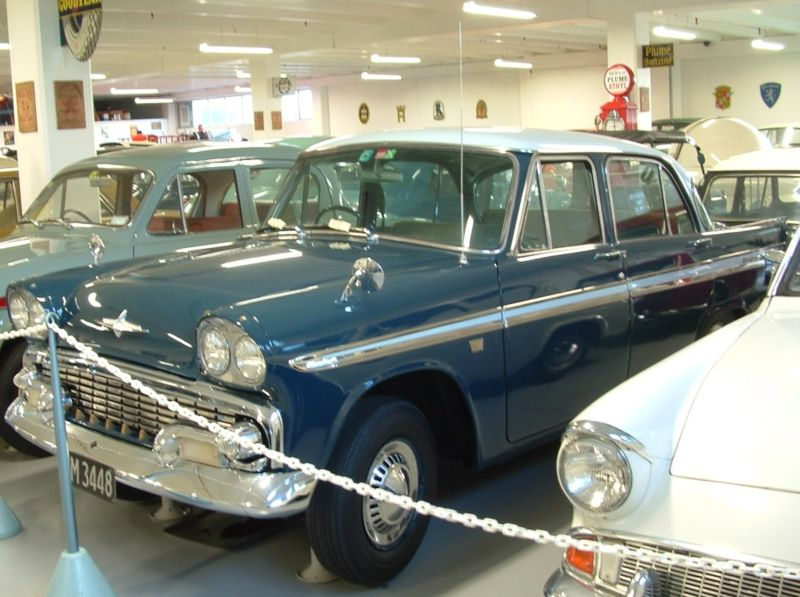
Prince Skyline ALSID-2

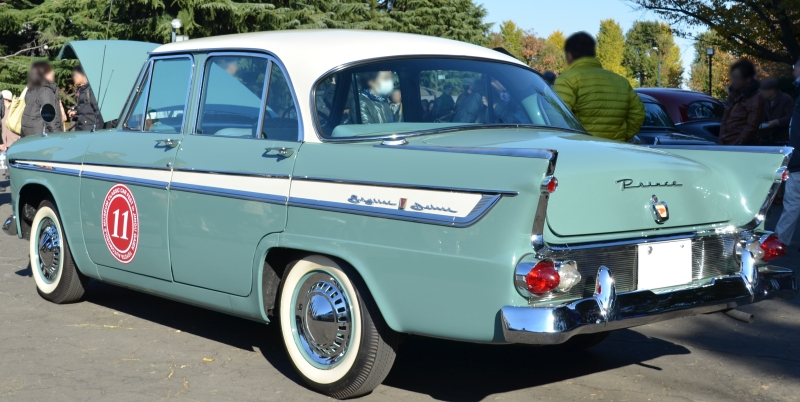
Prince Skyline ALSID-2

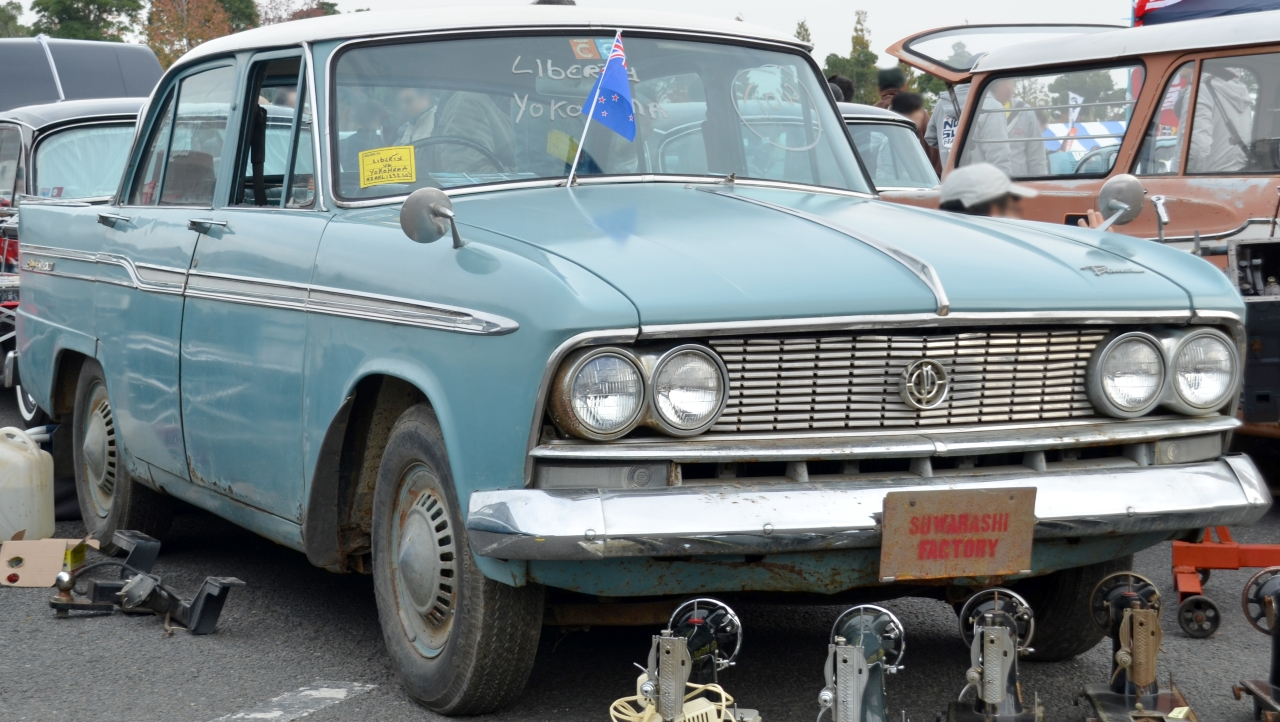
Prince Skyline S21

Prince Skyline Sport

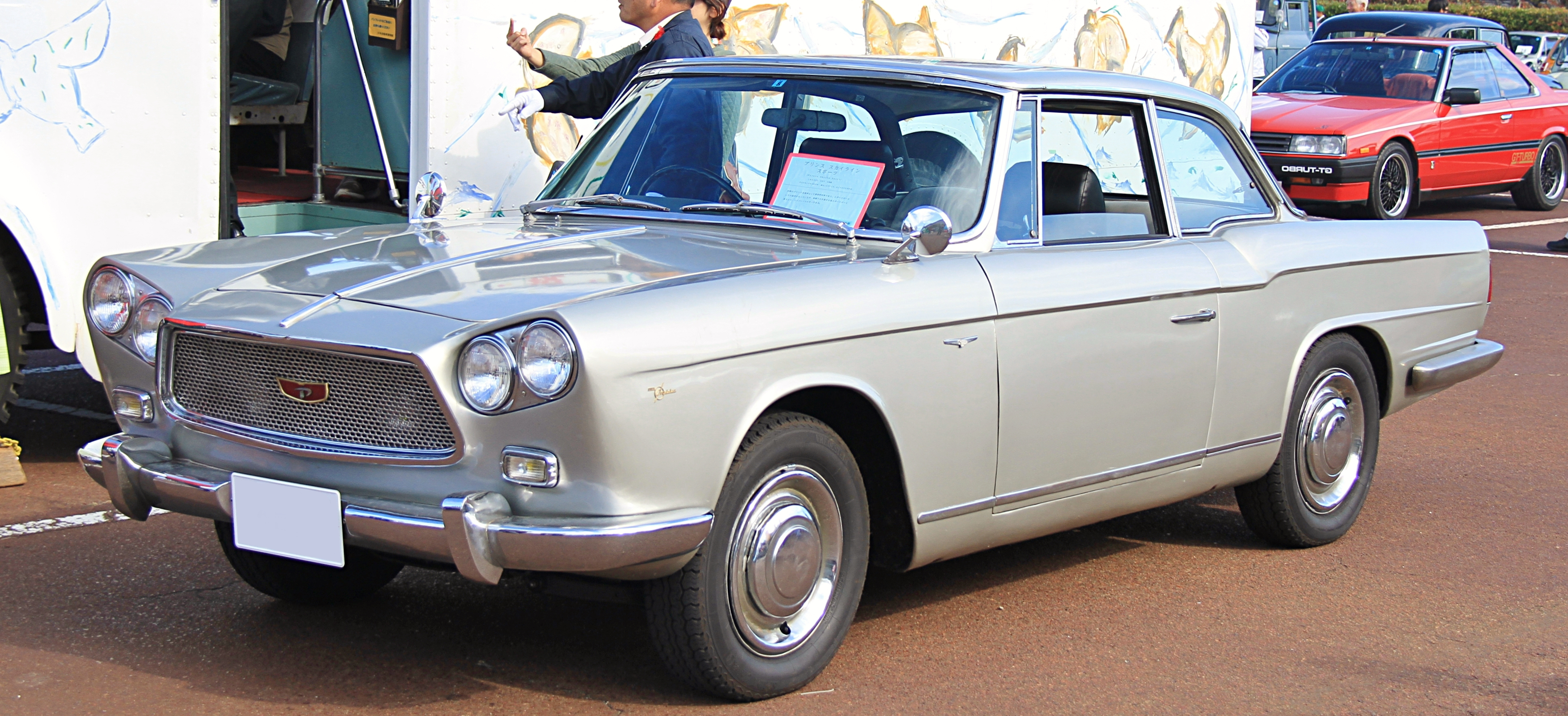
Prince Skyline Sport Coupe BLRA-3

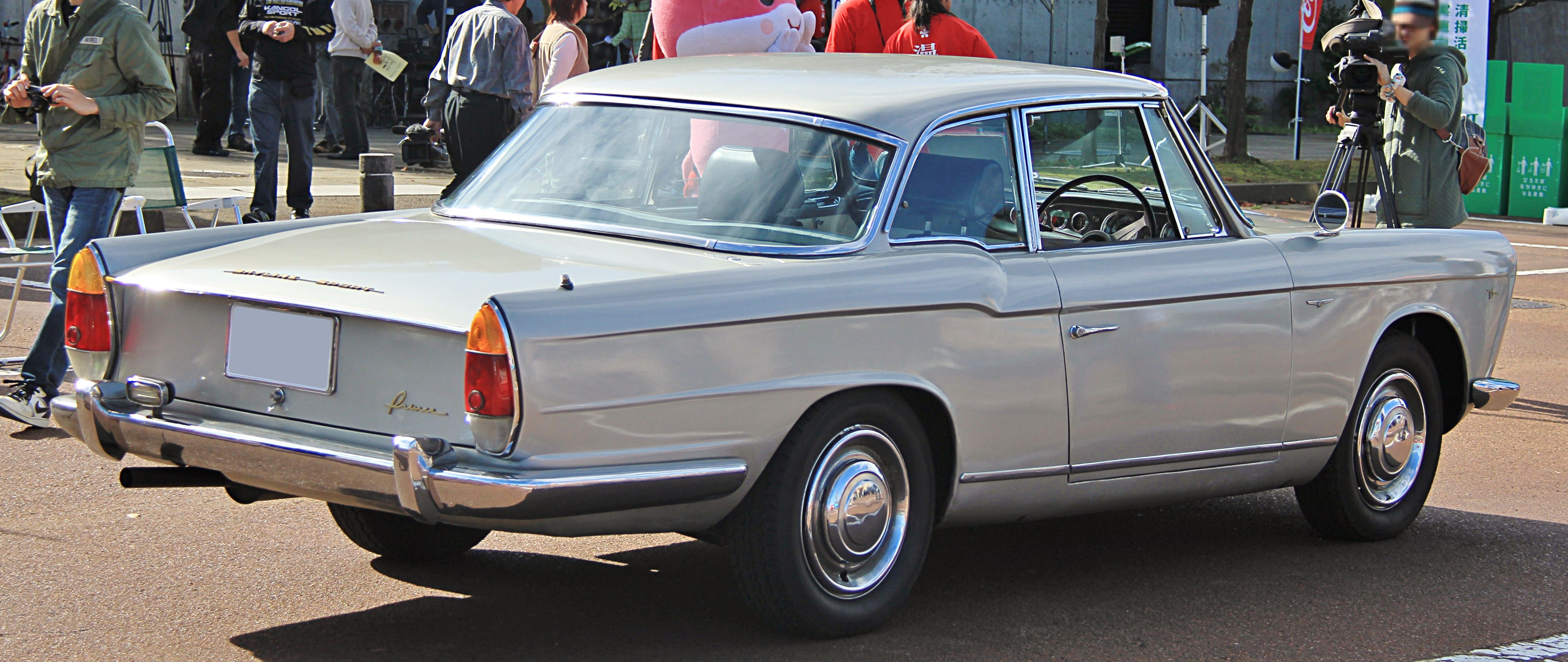
Prince Skyline Sport Coupe BLRA-3 (rear view)

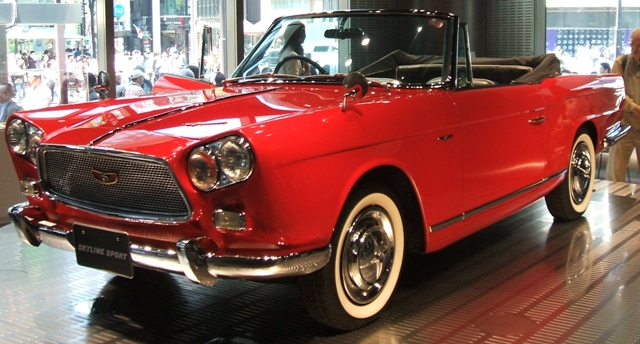
Prince Skyline Sport Convertible BLRA-3

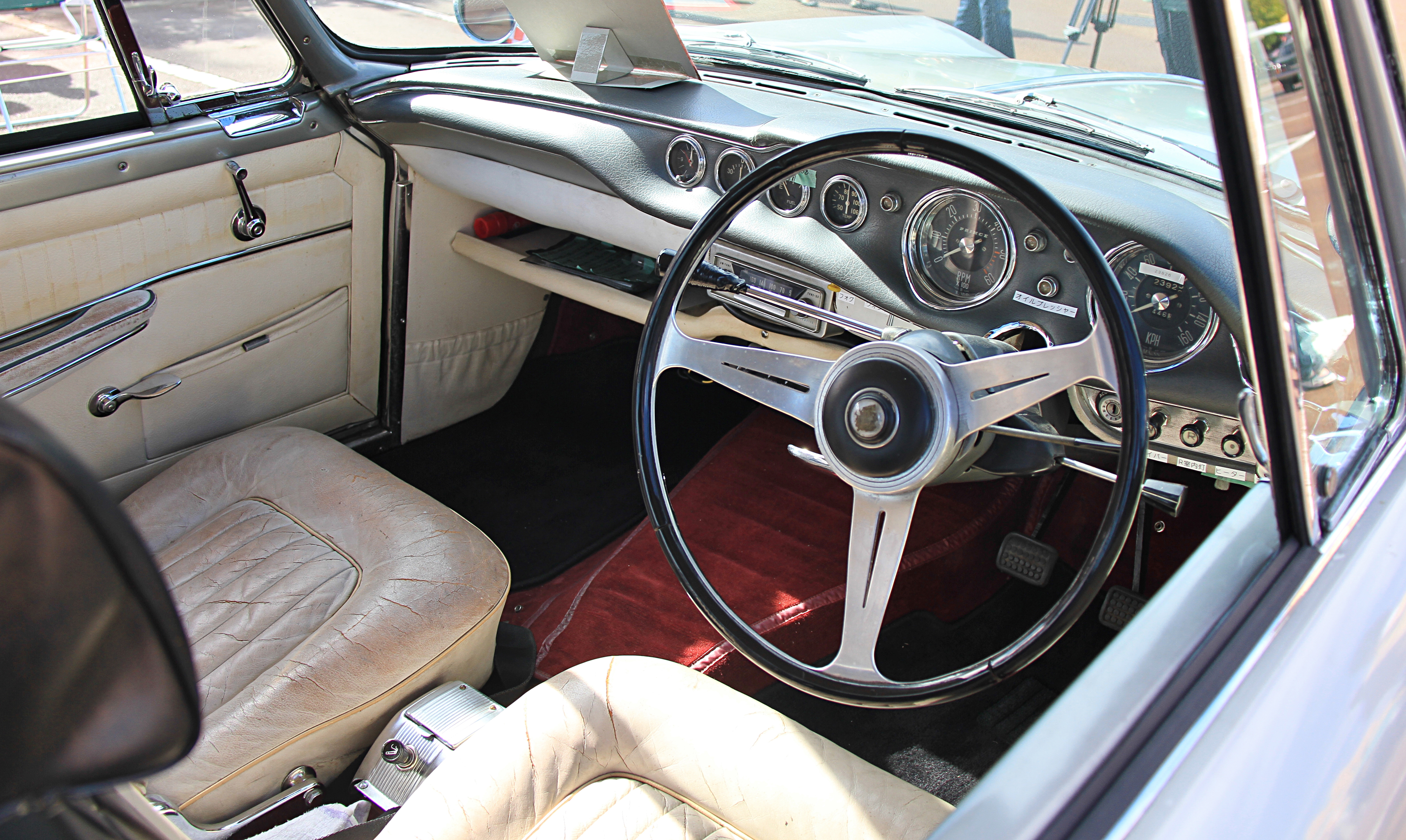
Prince Skyline Sport Convertible BLRA-3 (Interior)

== Second generation (Prince Skyline, 1963) ==
Second generation; Prince Skyline
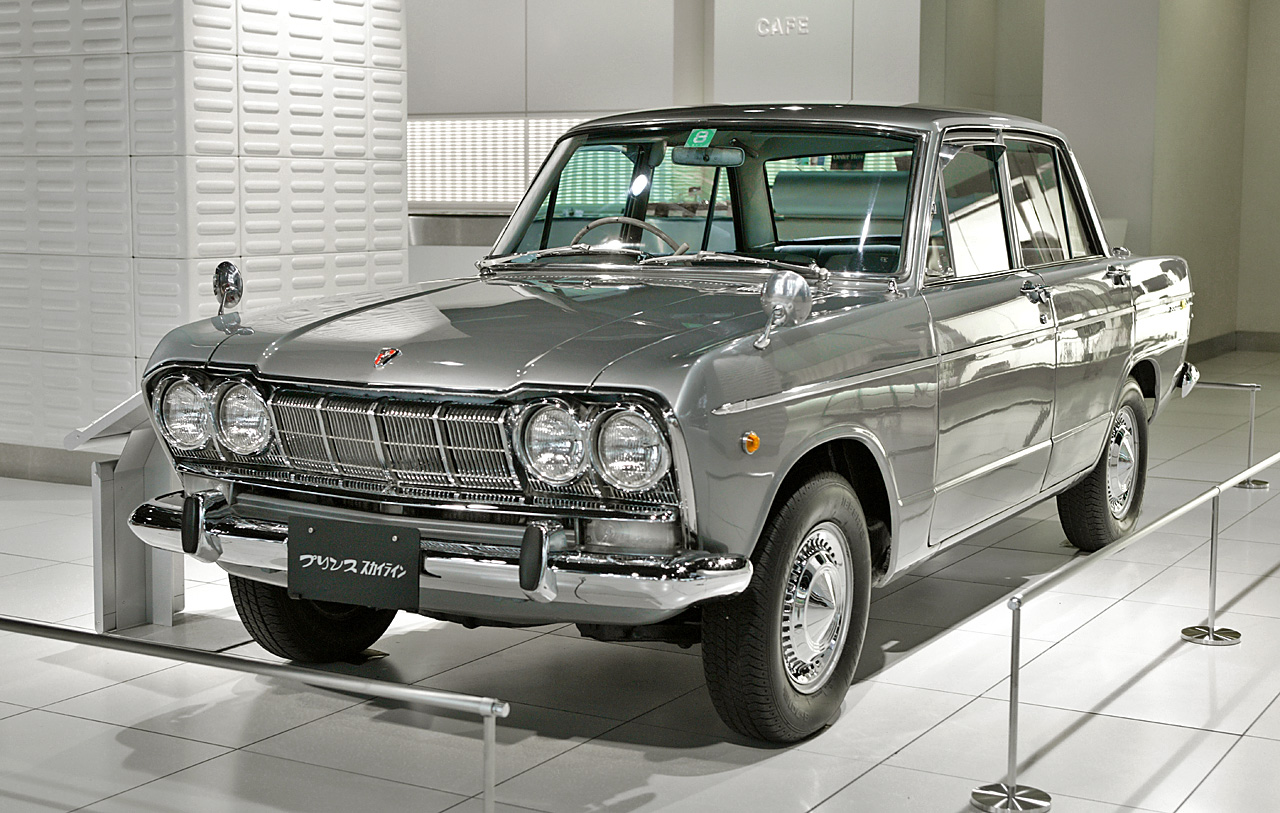
- Prince Skyline 1500 DeLuxe S50D-1

Overview
- Model code: S50; S54; S56; S57; V51; W50
- Also called: Prince Skyline; Prince A150; PMC A150; PMC-Mikado A150; PMC Skyline; Nissan A150; Prince A200GT; Nissan A200GT; Nissan Prince Skyline (from 1966)
- Production: September 1963 – August 1968; 114,238 units sold
- Assembly: Japan: Musashimurayama
- Designer: Shinichiro Sakurai

Body and chassis
- Body style: 4-door sedan; 5-door station wagon
- Layout: Front-engine, rear-wheel-drive
- Related: Prince Skyway; Prince Miler

Powertrain
- Engine: 1484 cc G-1 I4 (S50/V51/W50); 1483 cc G-15 I4 (S57); 1988 cc G-7 I6 (S54); 1862 cc D-6 diesel I4 (S56)
- Transmission: 3/4/5-speed manual; 2-speed automatic ("Space Flow")

Dimensions
- Wheelbase: 2,390 mm (94.1 in); 2,590 mm (102.0 in) (S54)
- Length: 3,990 mm (157.1 in) (S50S/S56); 4,100 mm (161.4 in) (S50D/S57); 4,125 mm (162.4 in) (V51); 4,175 mm (164.4 in) (W50); 4,235 mm (166.7 in) (S54-3); 4,255 mm (167.5 in) (S54-2); 4,300 mm (169.3 in) (S54-1)
- Width: 1,495 mm (58.9 in); 1,510 mm (59.4 in) (S54B-3)
- Height: 1,410 mm (55.5 in) (S54); 1,425 mm (56.1 in) (S56/W50); 1,435 mm (56.5 in) (S50/S57); 1,445 mm (56.9 in) (V51)
- Curb weight: 920 kg (2,028 lb) (S57); 935–960 kg (2,061–2,116 lb) (S50); 1,005 kg (2,216 lb) (S56); 1,025–1,095 kg (2,260–2,414 lb) (S54); 1,035–1,055 kg (2,282–2,326 lb) (V51/W50)

=== S50 ===
In 1961 Fuji Precision Industries changed its name to Prince Motor Company (for the second time). Two years later, in September 1963, the S50 Skyline Deluxe (S50D-1) was launched, followed by the Skyline Standard (S50S-1) in April 1964. This was the second generation car, and became one of the more desirable cars in Japan. It was powered by the G-1 engine, a 68 hp or 70 PS (51 kW) version of the old GA-4. The S50 series were available with a three-speed column shift transmission, or a four-speed floor shift transmission from February 1965 (Deluxe only). A two-speed automatic option was added to the Deluxe in June 1966. The lower priced and equipped Standard model was added in April 1964; aiming at taxi operators and others it also lacked bumper overriders, making it 11 cm shorter. Three main models of the S50 were built: the S50-1 (1964–1966), the lightly facelifted S50-2 (1966–1967) and the S50-3 (1967–1968). These all used the same engine, with the later S57 receiving a more modern unit.

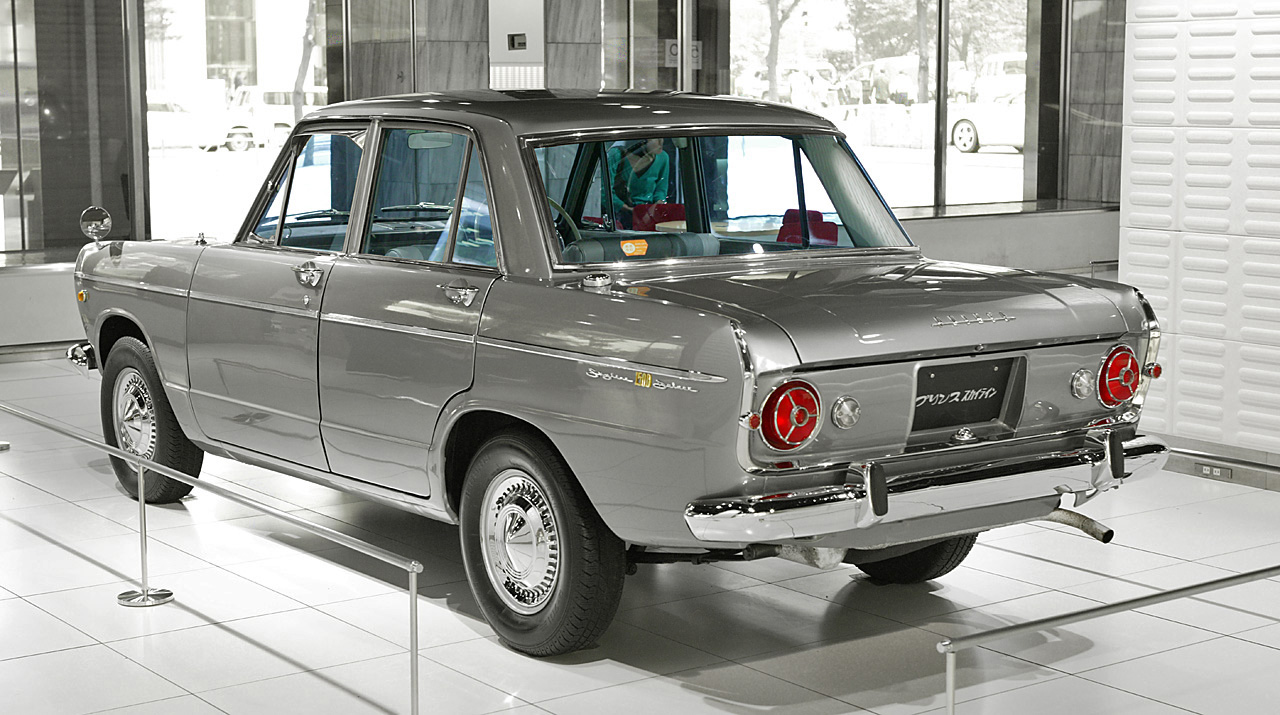
Prince Skyline 1500 DeLuxe S50D-1

Externally, the S50-1 was installed with rounded brake lights and integrated tail lights, with a centrally installed turn signal, similar in appearance to the Ford Galaxie of 1961. The significant appearance change from the previous generation seems to reflect a similar approach done by German company BMW in 1962 with the New Class series, in deciding to build a small, affordable, performance coupe and sedan.

The S50 was sold in some markets with an A150 designation. In European markets (and other export markets), it was also marketed as the PMC-Mikado A150. The A150 also saw exports to Hawaii. The S50-2 was also sold as the S56SE A190D for export markets in Europe and Asia (such as in British Hong Kong), which was equipped with the 55 hp (56 PS) 1.9 liter D-6 OHV diesel engine. This model had trim and equipment levels similar to the S50S-2. In Europe, period testers commented on the car's compact size (more like a 1.0 than a 1.5) and its sprightly performance, in large part due to the extremely low gearing. The car's ample lighting was also noted, offering twin headlights, a bevy of warning lamps, numerous engine room light fittings, etcetera. Also lauded were the cars road manners, as evident by the six-cylinder Skyline's competition successes.

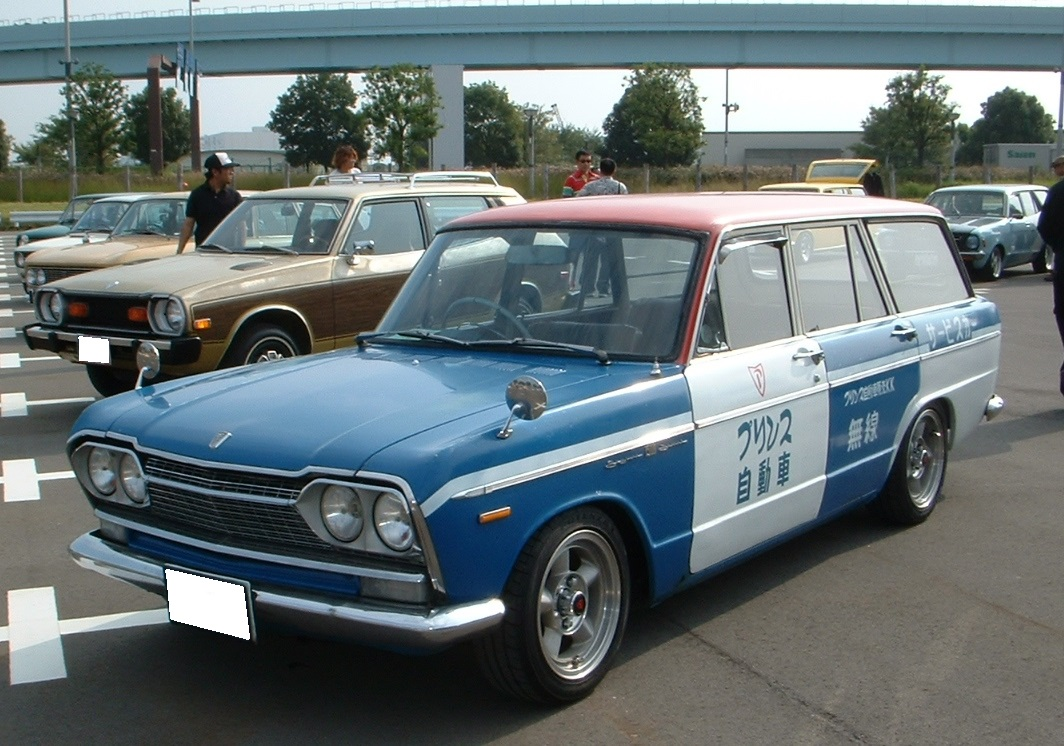
The commercial model Nissan Prince Skyline 1500 Van DeLuxe V51B (known as the Prince Skyway 1500 until October 1966)

In August 1966, Nissan and Prince merged and the S50 also appeared with Nissan Prince Skyline badging. In October 1966, the S50-2 was introduced. This light facelift included a new grille and rectangular taillights, as well as changes to the interior, and with the addition of an extraction vent on the C-pillar. It was sold as Prince Skyline, Prince A150, or PMC A150, depending on the market. All "Prince" dealership locations were added to the existing Nissan/Datsun Japanese dealerships, while retaining the Prince name to become the Nissan Prince Store.

In August 1967 the S50-3 was introduced. The tail lights and front side indicators were changed to a wider rectangular shape, but otherwise the car remained identical to the S50-2 series. The S50-3 was the last Prince model to use the G-1 engine. The Deluxe trim was rebranded as the S57 series.

=== S54 ===
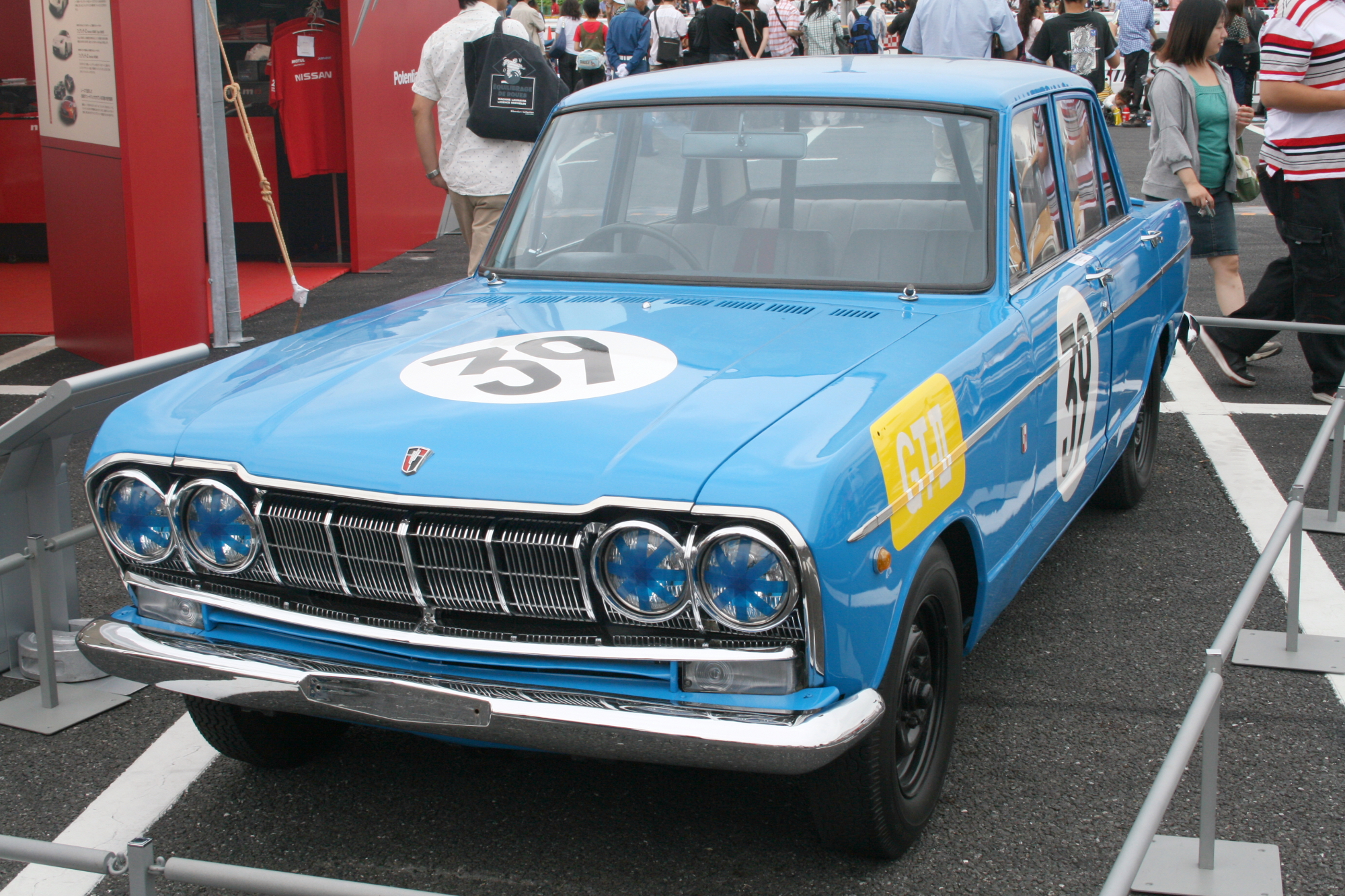
S54 Skyline 2000GT

Prince launched the racing version of the Skyline, the Skyline GT in May 1964. It was based on the S50D-1 and used the G-7 engine from the Gloria S41, though the car needed a 200 mm (8 in) extension to the wheelbase (all forward of the cowl) to provide space in the engine bay for the inline six. It entered the second Japanese Grand Touring II (GT-II) on 3 May 1964 and they hoped to win the race. Competing against the Porsche 904, the Skyline GTs managed second through to sixth places. Only 100 units S54A-1 were made for homologation purpose (92 road cars and 8 racing cars) and sold out instantly due to the success of the race vehicle. The S54A-1 was available with the standard single carburetor (G7-A) 2.0-liter inline-six engine (producing 105 PS (77 kW; 104 hp) and 16.0 kg⋅m (157 N⋅m; 116 lb⋅ft)), 4-speed manual transmission and tachometer as standard. The triple Weber carburetors, an LSD, 5-speed manual transmission, sport steering wheel and oil cooler were available as additional options.

In February 1965, the Prince Skyline 2000GT road car (S54B-2) was released to the Japanese market, followed by the less powerful 2000GT-A (S54A-2) in September on the same year and S54B-2 model was renamed to 2000GT-B.

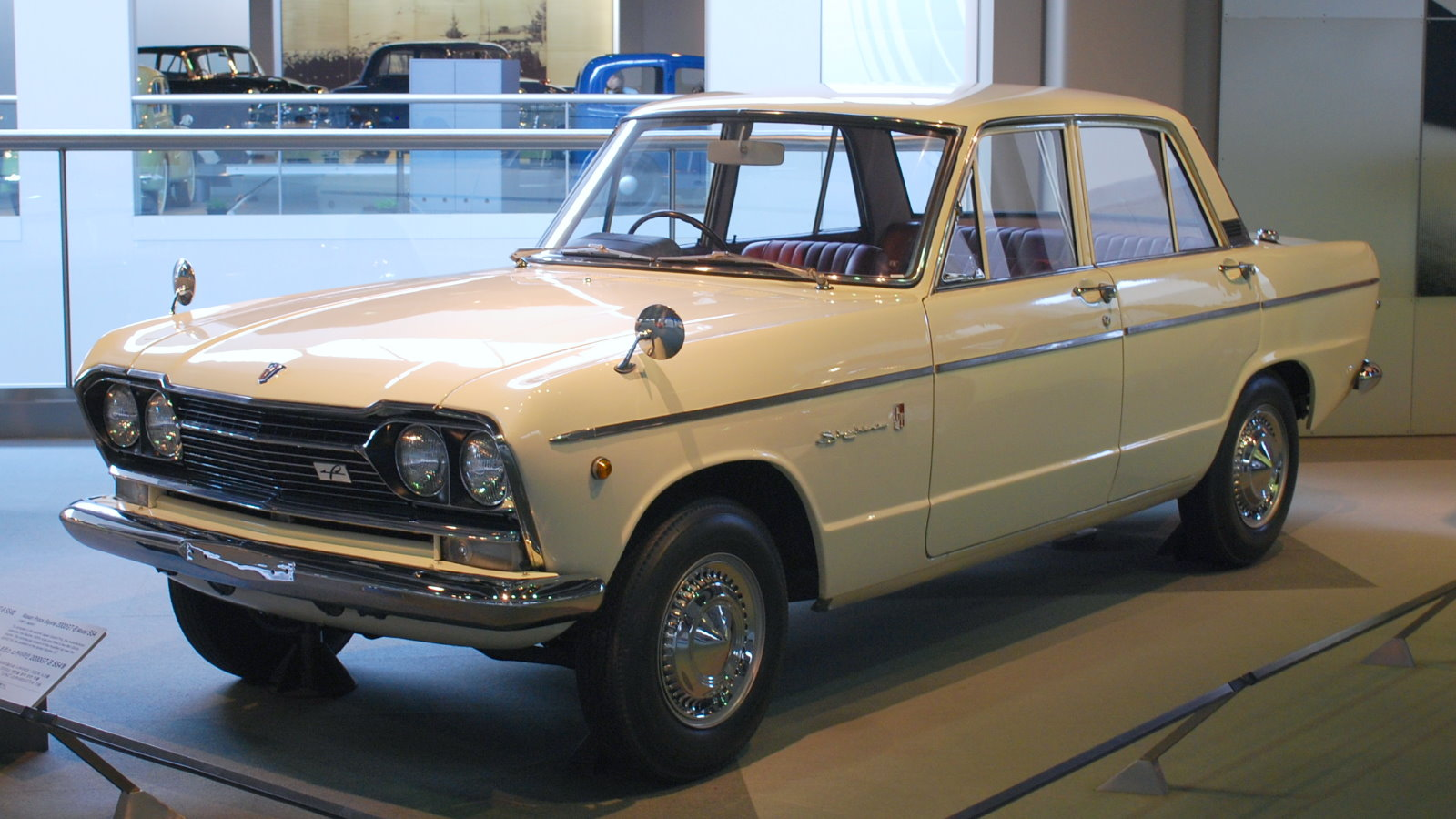
1966 Nissan Prince Skyline GT-B

The GT-B model featured three Weber 40DCOE-18 carburetors (G7-B; producing 125 PS (92 kW; 123 hp) at 5,600 rpm and 17.0 kg⋅m (167 N⋅m; 123 lb⋅ft) at 4,400 rpm), rear torsion bar suspension, Nardi steering wheel, power brakes and front disc brakes as standard. The cheaper GT-A did not receive Nardi steering wheel, booster brakes, front disc brakes and rear wheel torque rod. Both models could get additional options such as safety belts, radio, heather, bigger fuel tank, an LSD, 5-speed close ratio manual transmission and racing suspension kits.

In October 1966, the GT received mild facelift similar to S50D-2, but retained its original round taillights. This model was known as S54-3. Still with similar equipment as S54-2, except for seat belts and 5-speed manual transmission (GT-B only) that became standard.

The South Australian versions both used the S54B engine, the difference was in the gearbox, the GT-A had a 4-speed gearbox, and the GT-B had the European ZF 5-speed gearbox.

=== S57 ===
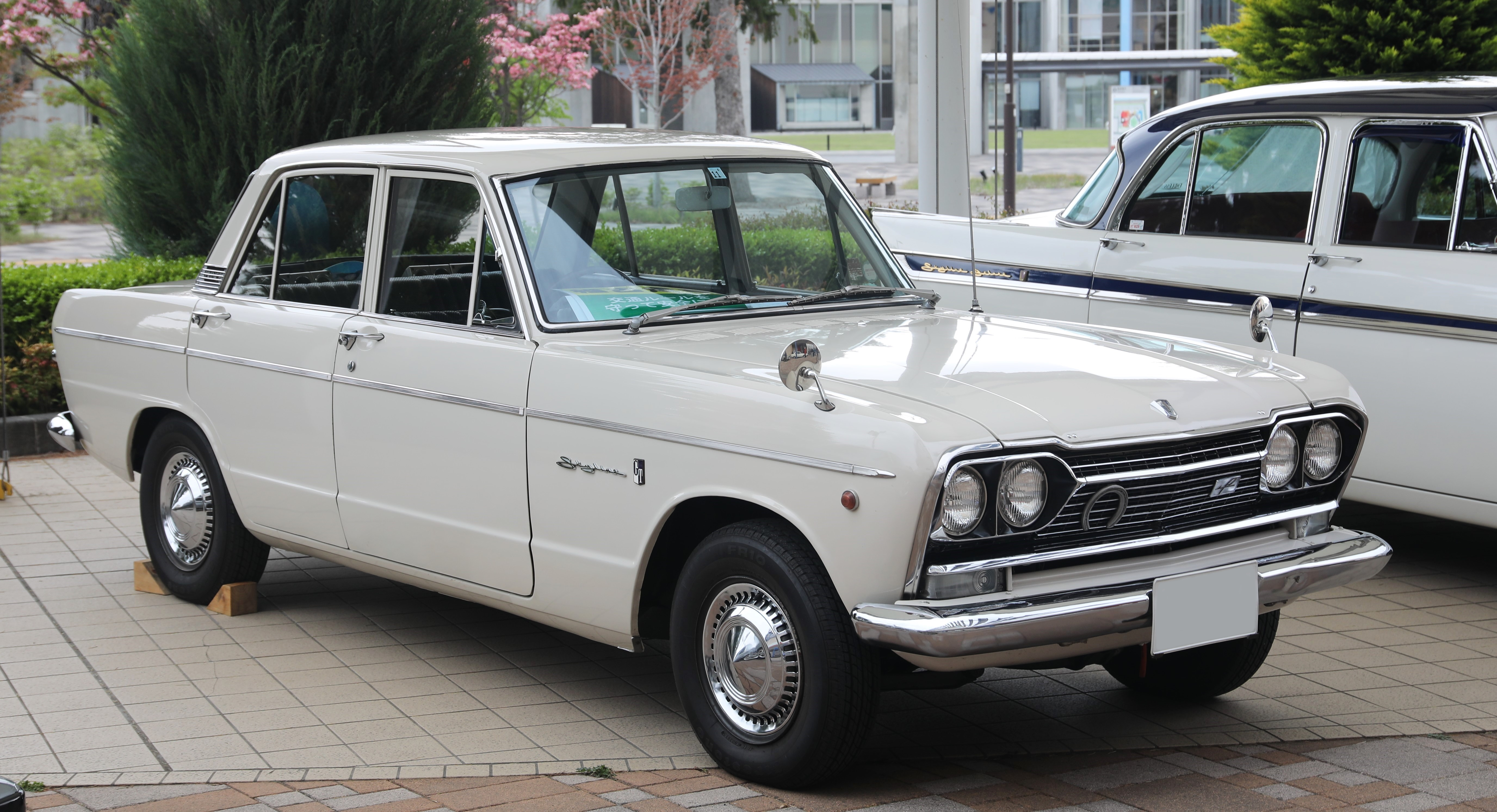
1966–1968 Nissan Prince Skyline 1500 GT

In August 1966 Prince released the successor of the S50D-2 called the S57. It used a new engine of Prince's (designed before the merger with Nissan), the OHC 1.5 L (1,483 cc) G15. At 88 PS (65 kW; 87 hp), it was the most-powerful engine in the Japanese 1,500 cc class. The S57D was almost identical to the S50S-3 except for using different grille with a red "88" badge (for 88 PS) and an "OHC" badge above the right side reversing light. The trunk badge said "Prince" and the side badges said "Skyline 1500" or "Skyline 1500 Deluxe". There was a "NISSAN" badge of the left side of the grille as well as well as below the left side backup light. After the Prince name was dropped, the "NISSAN" badge under the backup light disappeared (the badge on the grille remained), and the "Prince" badges were replaced by "NISSAN", but the stylized "P" emblem on the hood remained.

== Third generation (C10; 1968) ==
Third generation
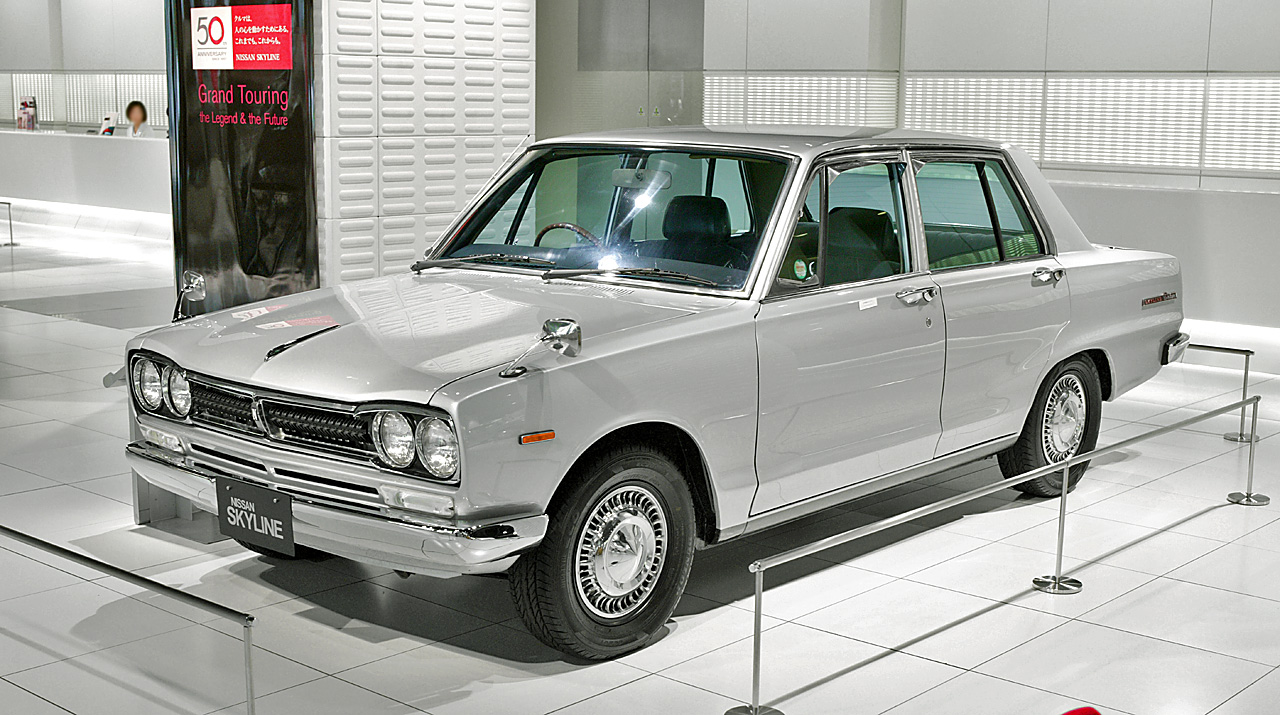
- C10 Nissan Skyline Sedan 1500 Deluxe

Overview
- Model code: C10
- Also called: Datsun Skyline; Datsun-Nissan 2000GT; Datsun-Nissan 2400GT
- Production: August 1968 – September 1972; 310,447 units sold
- Assembly: Japan: Musashimurayama
- Designer: Shinichiro Sakurai

Body and chassis
- Body style: 4-door sedan; 5-door station wagon; 2-door coupe
- Layout: Front-engine, rear-wheel-drive
- Related: Nissan Laurel (C30)

Powertrain
- Engine: Gasoline: 1.5 L G-15 I4; 1.8 L G-18 I4; 2.0 L L20 I6 (2000GT); 2.0 L S20 I6 (GT-R); 2.4 L L24 I6 (2400GT)
- Transmission: 3-speed automatic; 3/4/5-speed manual

Dimensions
- Wheelbase: 2,490 mm (98.0 in) (4-cylinder sedan/coupé/wagon); 2,570 mm (101.2 in) (GT-R coupé); 2,640 mm (103.9 in) (6-cylinder/GT-R sedan)
- Length: 4,135 mm (162.8 in) (4-cylinder coupé); 4,265–4,275 mm (167.9–168.3 in) (wagon); 4,330 mm (170.5 in) (6-cylinder/GT-R coupé); 4,395 mm (173.0 in) (GT-R sedan); 4,400–4,430 mm (173.2–174.4 in) (6-cylinder sedan)
- Width: 1,595 mm (62.8 in); 1,610 mm (63.4 in) (GT-R sedan); 1,665 mm (65.6 in) (GT-R coupé)
- Height: 1,370 mm (53.9 in) (GT-R coupé); 1,375 mm (54.1 in) (6-cylinder coupé); 1,385 mm (54.5 in) (GT-R sedan); 1,390 mm (54.7 in) (4-cylinder coupé/6-cylinder sedan); 1,405 mm (55.3 in) (4-cylinder sedan)
- Curb weight: 945–1,110 kg (2,083.4–2,447.1 lb) (coupé); 960–1,130 kg (2,116.4–2,491.2 lb) (sedan); 1,015–1,035 kg (2,237.7–2,281.8 lb) (wagon)

The C10 series of August 1968, which began its development under Prince at the company's Ogikubo R&D centre in the suburbs of Tokyo, was marketed with a Nissan badge. By the time the C10 went on sale, the Prince nameplate had been completely phased out on cars and trucks. The dealer network selling the cars became the Nissan Prince Store, and the marketing group stayed at the Prince headquarters in Mita instead of moving to Nissan's headquarters in Ginza.

The C10 Skyline was launched with Prince's 1.5 L OHC G15 I4 like the S57. A 1.8 L G18 version was also available. A station wagon variant, known previously as the Prince Skyway, was offered with this generation. A hardtop coupé was introduced in October 1970. The Skyline now shared its platform with the all-new, luxury-oriented, and longer wheelbase Laurel, and was unique to the Nissan Motor Store as a junior companion to the executive limousine Nissan President. The suspension used MacPherson struts for the front wheels and Semi-trailing arm independent suspension for the rear wheels.

The brake- and tail-lights were changed from circle units to square units, but now included dual units for both the left and right side of the vehicle. As the Skyline was now a Nissan product, it was repositioned above the Bluebird as a more sport-oriented sedan and coupe, while the Bluebird was unique to Nissan Store locations. Its appearance shows some resemblance to the earlier 1961 Fiat 2300, designed by Pininfarina.

=== 2000GT ===
In October 1968 the GC10 2000GT's engine power was decreased to 105 hp (78 kW), Nissan introduced an automatic variant in June 1970, as well as a 2-door coupe in October 1970.

=== 2000GT-X ===
In September 1971, the KGC10 2000 GT-X received a 2.0 L (1,998 cc) L20SU straight-six engine instead of the Prince G-7 engine. The chassis was already designed to fit a straight six, to avoid the S54 extension problem. 130 PS (96 kW; 128 hp) was available from this new engine. In March 1972 the lineup was expanded to include a four-door GT-X sedan.

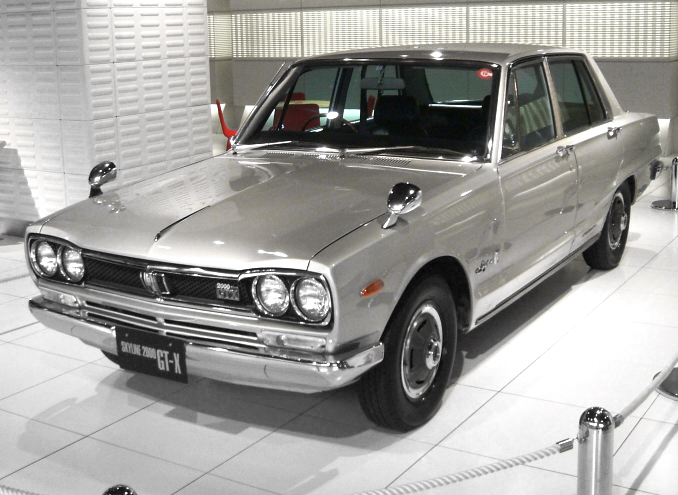
Facelift Nissan Skyline 2000 GT-X sedan (KGC10)

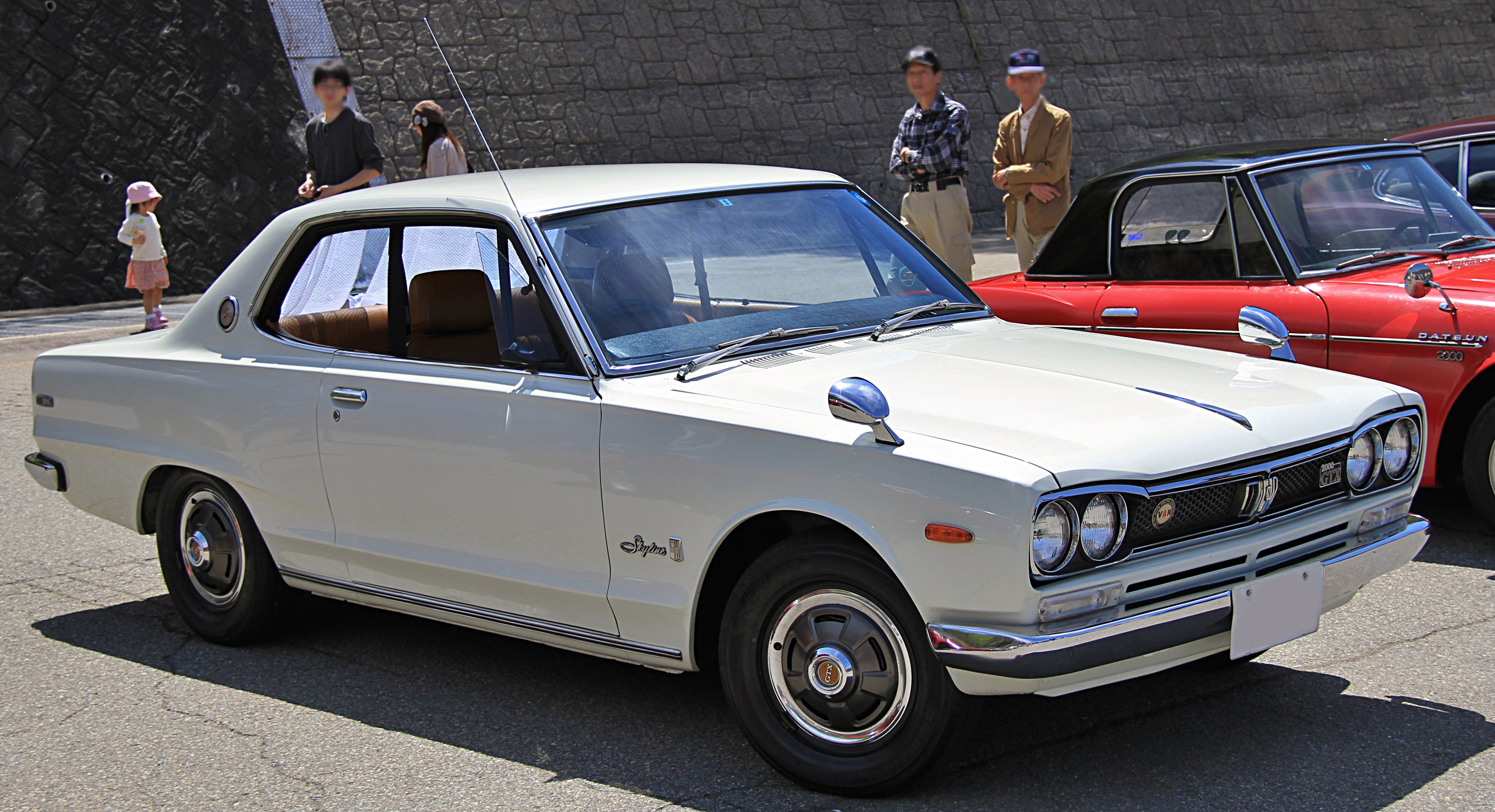
Facelift Skyline 2000 GT-X hardtop coupé (KGC10)

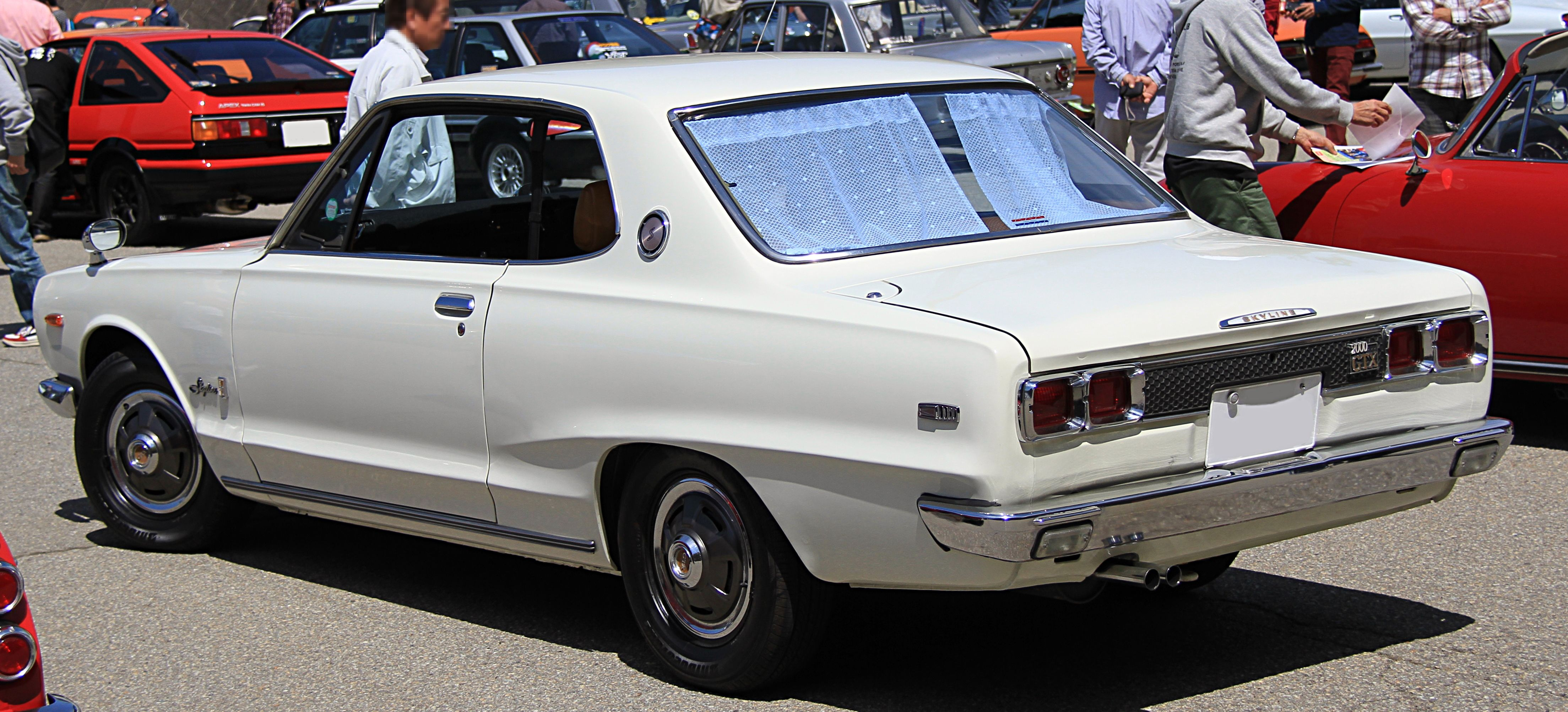
Facelift Skyline 2000 GT-X hardtop coupé (KGC10)

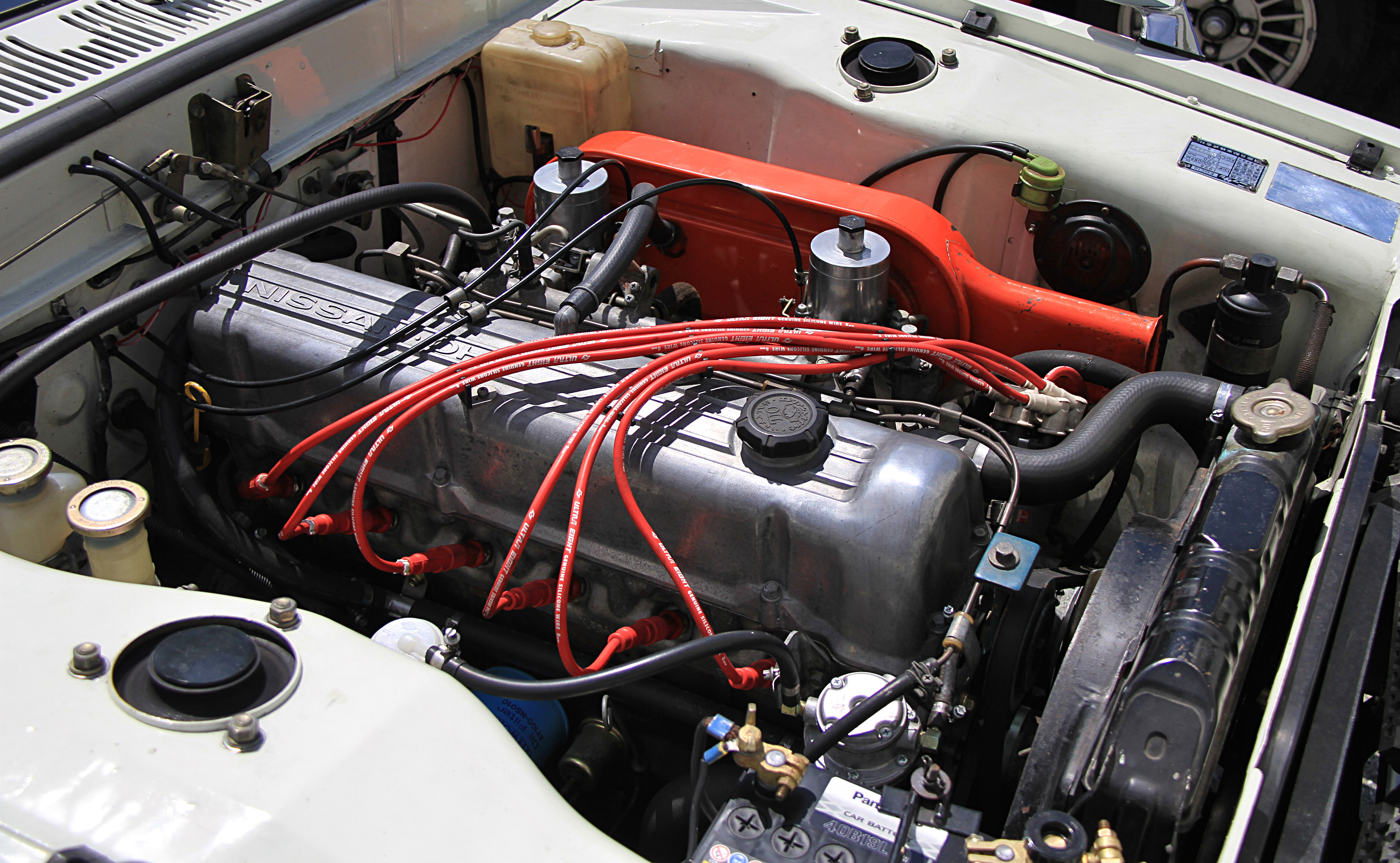
L20 engine

=== GT-R (PGC10/KPGC10) ===
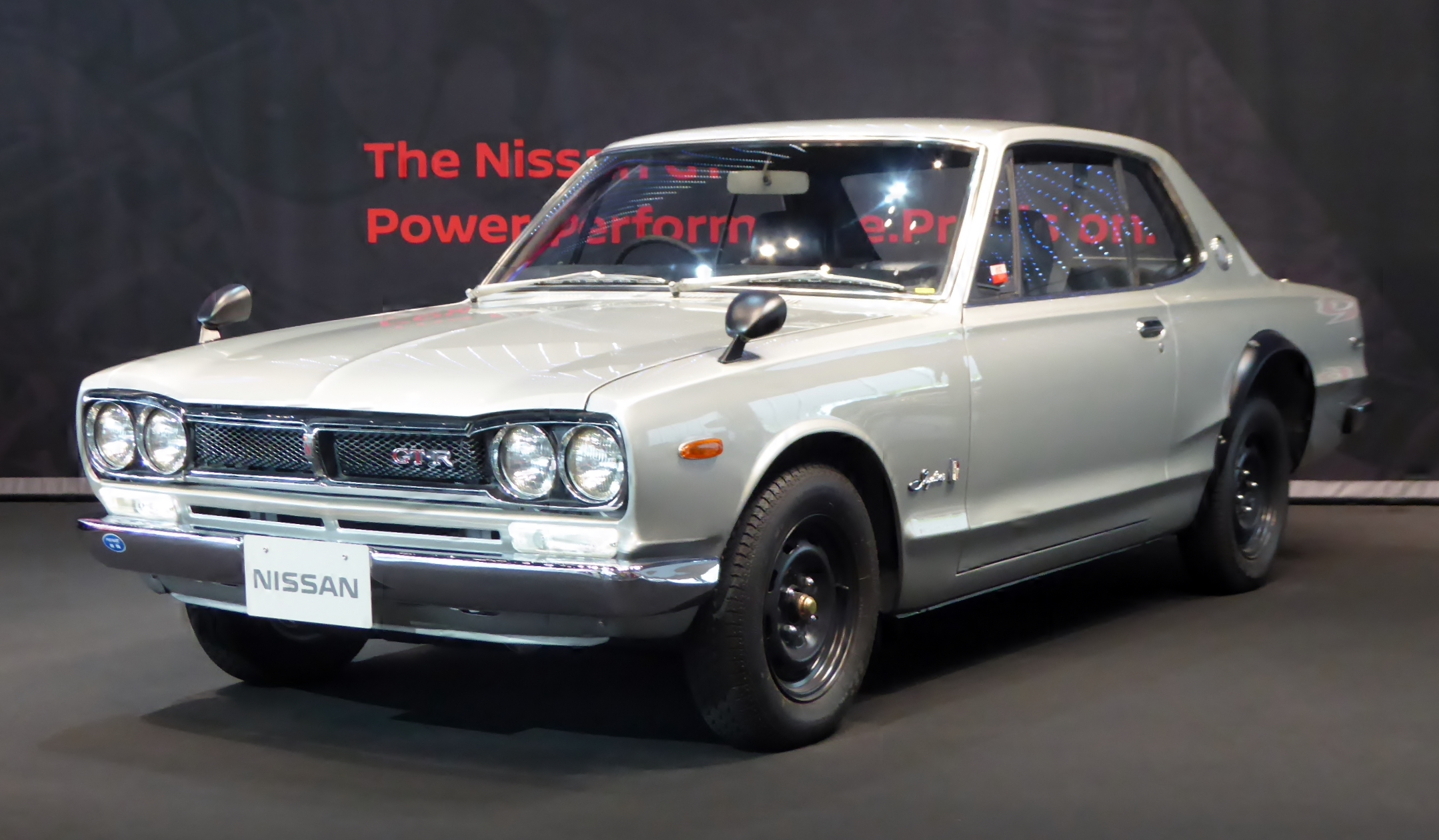
Nissan Skyline KGC10 2000 GT-R

The first GT-R Skyline appeared in February 1969. Called the PGC-10 (KPGC-10 for later coupé version) internally and Hakosuka (ハコスカ) by fans. Hako (ハコ) means box in Japanese, and suka (スカ) is short for Skyline (スカイライン; Sukairain). It used the 2.0 L (1998 cc) S20 I6. This new DOHC engine (which was designed by the former Prince engineers) produced 160 hp (119 kW) and 180 N⋅m (133 lb⋅ft) of torque, and was similar to the GR8 engine used in the Prince R380 racing car.

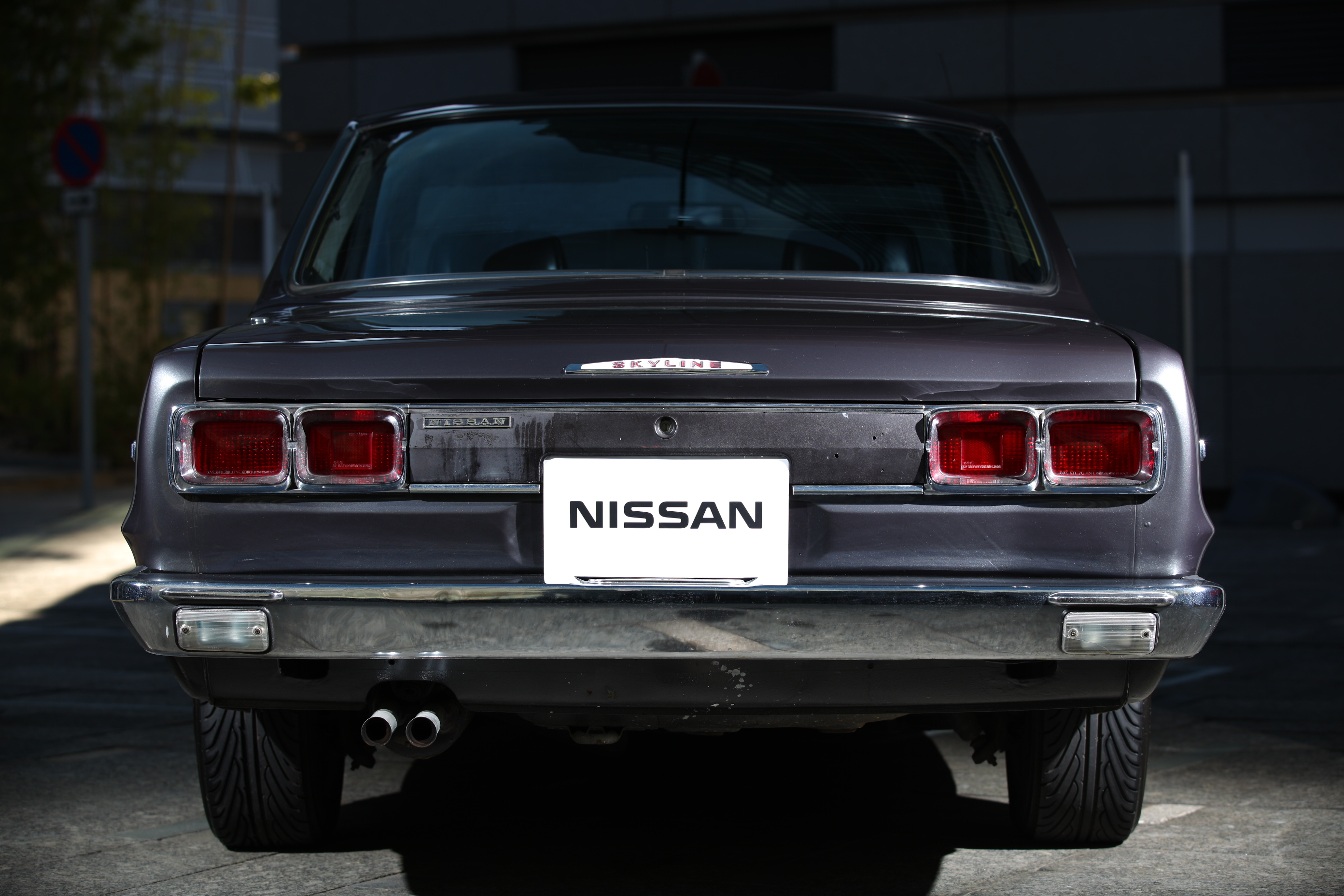
Rear view of 1971 Skyline GT-X

The GT-R began as a sedan, but a 2-door coupé version was debuted in October 1970 and introduced in March 1971. The cars were stripped of unnecessary equipment to be as light as possible for racing, and performed well at the track. The sedan racked up 33 victories in less than two years, and the coupé stretched this to 50 through 1972.

The C10 raced against many cars including the Toyota 1600GT, Isuzu Bellett GTR, Mazda Familia (R100) & Capella (RX-2) – even Porsche. In late 1971 the new Mazda RX-3 became the GT-R's main rival. The GT-R managed a few more victories before the RX-3 ended the GT-R's winning streak.

Models

- 1500 – 1.5 L G-15 I4, 88 hp (71 kW), 128 N⋅m (94 lb⋅ft)
- 1500 – 1.5 L G-15 I4, 95 hp (71 kW), 128 N⋅m (94 lb⋅ft)
- 1800 – 1.8 L G-18 I4, 105 hp (78 kW), 150 N⋅m (111 lb⋅ft)
- 2000GT – 2.0 L L20 I6, 120 hp (89 kW), 167 N⋅m (123 lb⋅ft)
- 2000GT-X – 2.0 L L20SU I6, 130 hp (96 kW), 172 N⋅m (127 lb⋅ft)
- 2000GT-R – 2.0 L S20 I6, 160 hp (118 kW), 180 N⋅m (133 lb⋅ft)
- 2400GT 2.4 L – L24 I6, 130 hp (97 kW), 198 N⋅m (146 lb⋅ft)

=== Body styles ===
- C-10 4-door sedan or 5-door wagon (August 1968 – September 1972)
- GC-10 4-door 2000GT (October 1968 – September 1972)
- KGC-10 2000GT 2-door (October 1970 – September 1972)
- PGC-10 4-door GT-R Skyline (February 1969 – September 1970)
- KPGC-10 2 Door GT-R Skyline (October 1970 – September 1972)
- KGC-10 2000GT-X 2-door (September 1971 – September 1972)
- KGC-10 2000GT-X 4-door (March 1972 – September 1972)
- GLC-10 2000GT 4-door Left Hand Drive
- HGLC-10 2400GT 4-door Left Hand Drive

== Fourth generation (C110; 1972) ==
Fourth generation
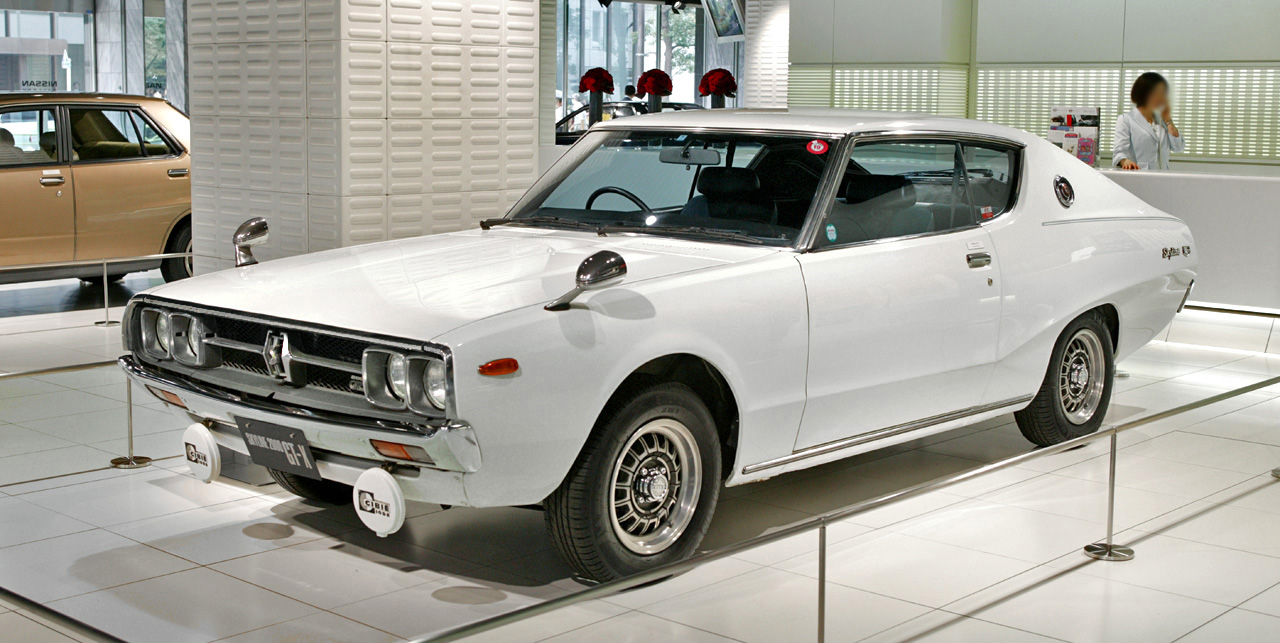
- 1975 Nissan Skyline 2000 GTX-E Hardtop (C111)

Overview
- Model code: C110
- Also called: Datsun 160/180/240K; Datsun 240K GT; Datsun Skyline 240K GT
- Production: September 1972 – August 1977; 670,562 units sold
- Assembly: Japan: Musashimurayama
- Designer: Shinichiro Sakurai

Body and chassis
- Body style: 4-door sedan; 2-door coupe; 5-door station wagon
- Layout: Front-engine, rear-wheel-drive
- Related: Nissan Laurel (C130)

Powertrain
- Engine: Gasoline: 1.6 L G16 SOHC I4; 1.8 L G18 SOHC I4; 2.0 L L20A/E SOHC I6; 2.0 L S20 DOHC I6 (GT-R); 2.4 L L24 SOHC I6
- Transmission: 3-speed automatic; 3/4/5-speed manual

Dimensions
- Wheelbase: 2,515 mm (99.0 in) (4-cylinder model); 2,610 mm (102.8 in) (6-cylinder model)
- Length: 4,250 mm (167.3 in) (4-cylinder model); 4,315 mm (169.9 in) (wagon/van); 4,460 mm (175.6 in) (6-cylinder model)
- Width: 1,625 mm (64.0 in); 1,695 mm (66.7 in) (GT-R)
- Height: 1,380 mm (54.3 in) (GT-R); 1,385 mm (54.5 in) (6-cylinder hardtop); 1,395 mm (54.9 in) (4-cylinder hardtop/6-cylinder sedan); 1,405 mm (55.3 in) (4-cylinder sedan/wagon); 1,425 mm (56.1 in) (van)
- Curb weight: 980–1,095 kg (2,160.5–2,414.1 lb) (4-cylinder model); 1,135–1,240 kg (2,502.2–2,733.7 lb) (6-cylinder model); 1,145 kg (2,524.3 lb) (GT-R); 1,030–1,070 kg (2,270.8–2,358.9 lb) (wagon/van)

The C110 generation was produced from September 1972 through August 1977. For export in the 1970s, the C110 and GC110 Skyline was sold as the Datsun K-series, with models such as the Datsun 160K, 180K and Datsun 240K.

The C110 Skyline sedan available in: Standard, Deluxe, Sporty Deluxe, Sporty GL, GT, and GT-X. The coupe (Hardtop) was available in Sporty Deluxe, Sporty GL, GT, and GT-X, the wagon was only available in Sporty GL, and the van was only available in Standard and Deluxe.

The body variations include a four-door sedan, a two-door hardtop, and a wagon/van. The hardtop was redesigned in a fastback style, a stark contrast to its predecessor. The C110 was more fussy in its styling than its predecessor, particularly so in wagon form, where unusually for a wagon design, no windows were fitted between the C and D pillars. The platform is basically the same as that of the C130 Laurel.

The rear tail and brake lights were reverted to round circular units in the C110, similar to those introduced in 1963, albeit with dual units from the previous generation; this appearance has since become a traditional Skyline feature. The styling also influenced a smaller, more affordable two-door coupe, called the Silvia, introduced in 1975.

Nissan introduced its emission control technology, primarily consisting of fuel injection on trim packages ending with an "E", using the moniker Nissan NAPS also in October 1975 to comply with the 1976 gas emission regulations. In February 1976, the model was facelifted and became C111 model.

The C110 Skyline was better known as the "Ken & Mary" or "Kenmeri" (ケンメリ) Skyline, stemming from the advertisement campaign in Japan at the time which featured a young couple (Ken and Mary) who relaxed and enjoyed the countryside in Ken and Mary's Skyline (ケンとメリーのスカイライン). The ads were highly successful and perhaps as a result the C110 was sold in very large numbers in Japan. Kenmeri was also a play on the term "Meriken" (メリケン) an old Japanese slang term for "American" due to the new Skyline's resemblance of American muscle cars of the time.

It sold just as well in Australia (in a 2.4L 6-cylinder form, badged as "Datsun 240K"). There, the 240K was about the same price as a Ford Falcon GT or BMW 5 Series, around AUD$5000.

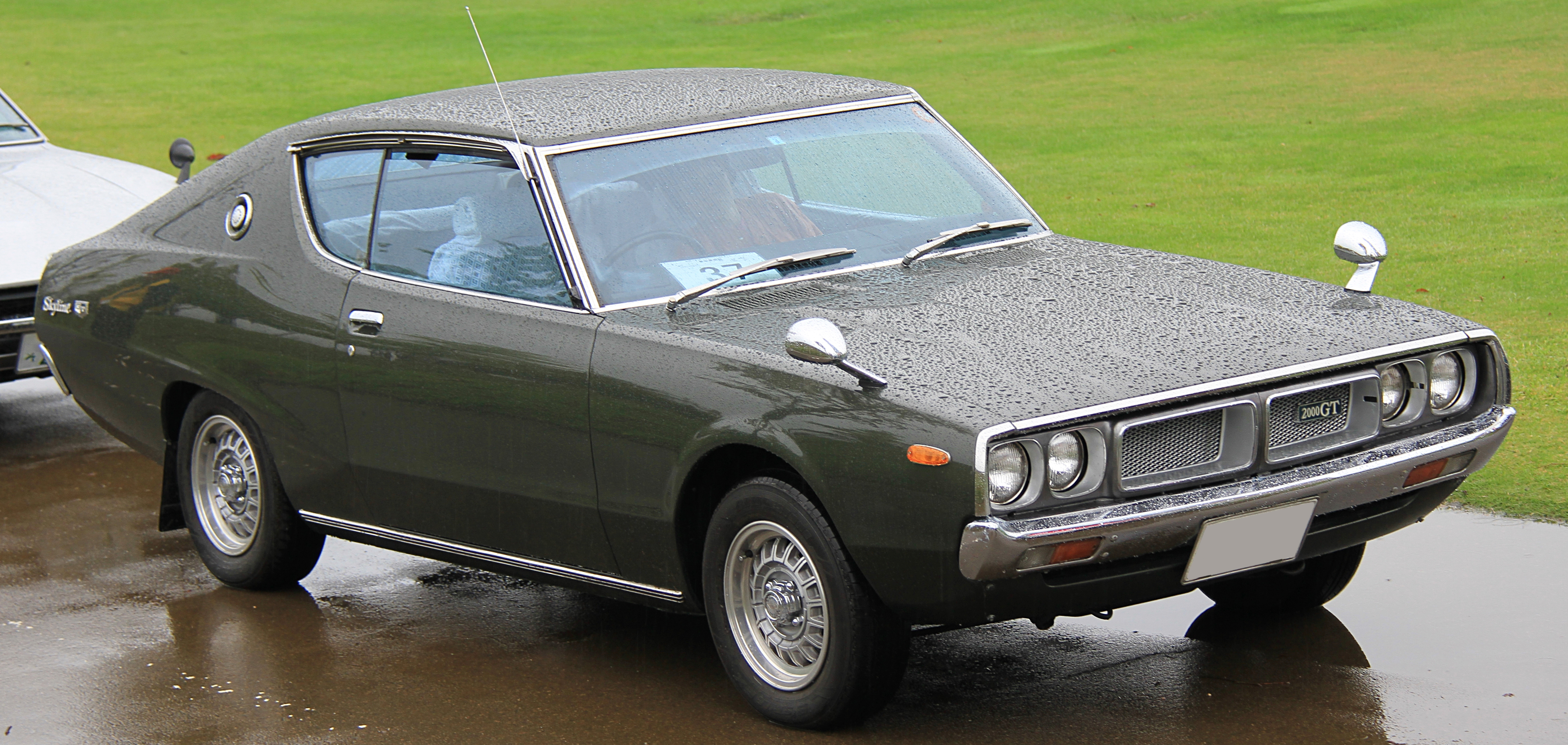
1972–1975 2000GT Hardtop

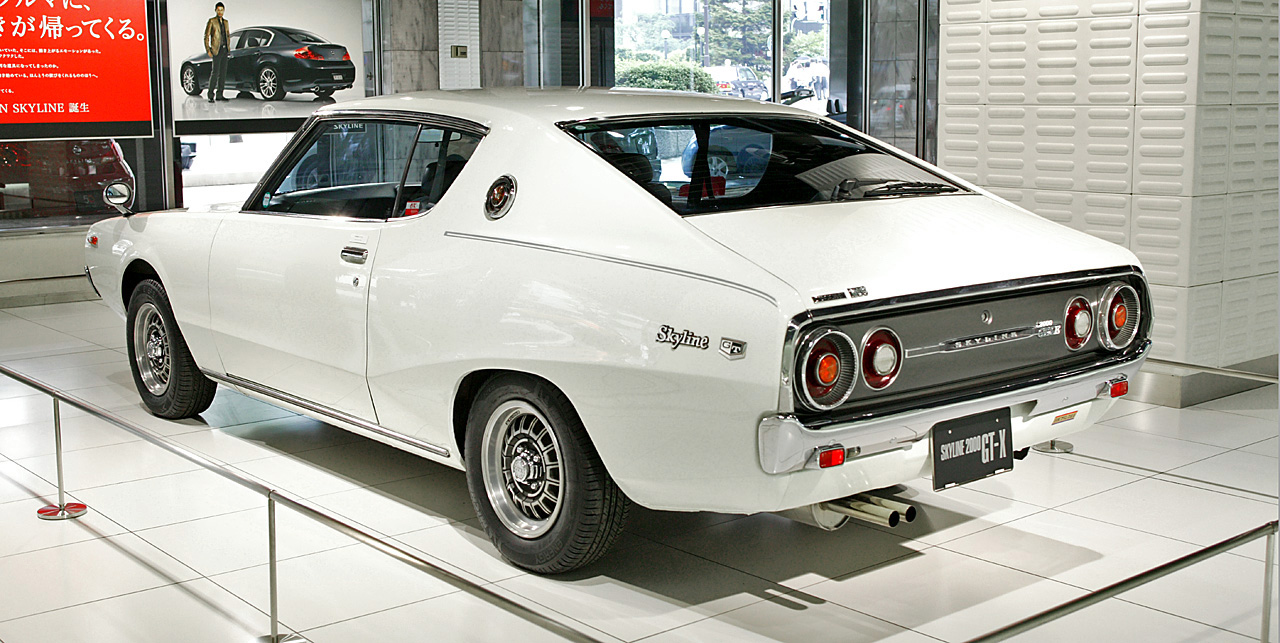
Rear view (Hardtop)

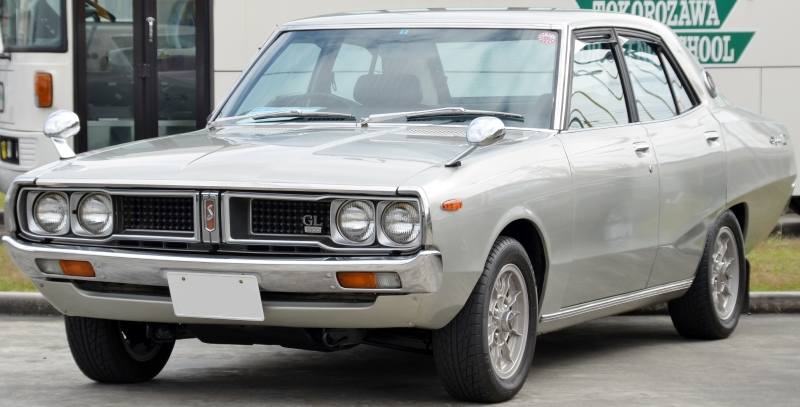
C110 Nissan Skyline sedan 1800 GL

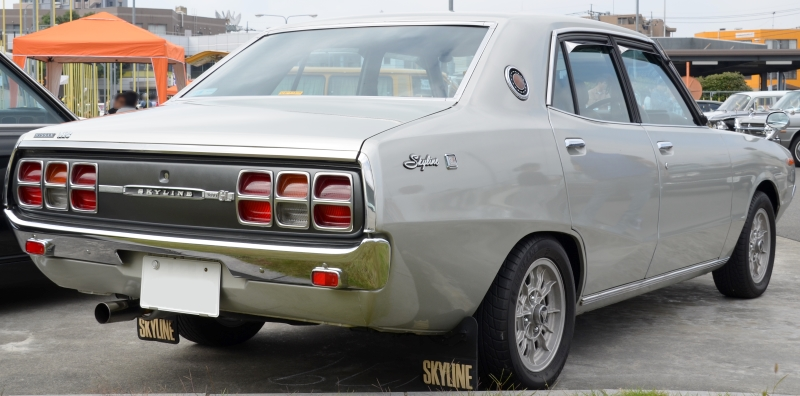
Rear view (sedan)

=== GT-R (KPGC110) ===
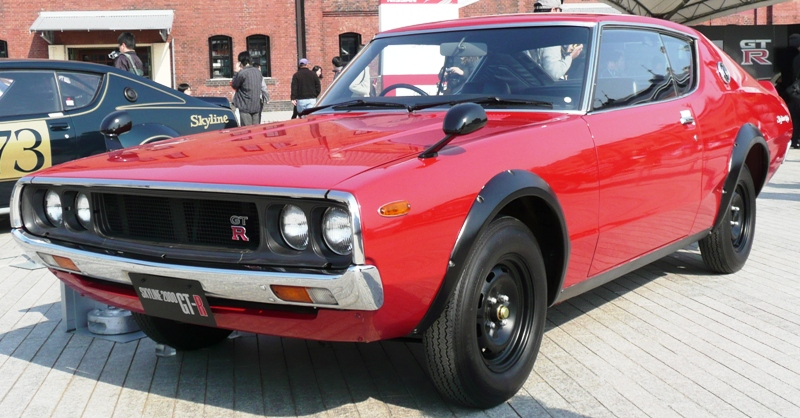
Nissan Skyline 2000GT-R (KPGC110)

The Skyline GT-R hardtop was built from January 1973 to April 1973 after its introduction at the 1972 Tokyo Motor Show. The 1973 oil crisis saw many people preferring economy cars to high-performance sports models. Nissan pulled out of Motor Racing shortly afterwards, and so there was no purpose for the GT-R. It was not officially exported anywhere, although Nissan contemplated exporting to Australia. Only 197 KPGC110 GT-Rs were ever sold in Japan through specialist Nissan Performance shops (before it was called NISMO). In Japan the C110 Skyline GT-R was discontinued because did not comply with new emissions laws. This was the last GT-R for 16 years until the BNR32 in 1989.

=== Models ===
- 1600/160K – 1.6 L G16 I4
  - 100 PS (99 hp; 74 kW) / 135 N⋅m (14 kg⋅m; 100 lb⋅ft)
- 1800/180K – 1.8 L G18 I4
  - 105 PS (104 hp; 77 kW) / 150 N⋅m (15 kg⋅m; 111 lb⋅ft)
- 2000GT – 2.0 L L20A I6
  - 115 PS (113 hp; 85 kW) / 162 N⋅m (17 kg⋅m; 119 lb⋅ft) (single carburetor regular gasoline)
  - 120 PS (118 hp; 88 kW) / 167 N⋅m (17 kg⋅m; 123 lb⋅ft) (single carburetor high octane gasoline)
- 2000GT-X – 2.0 L L20A I6
  - 125 PS (123 hp; 92 kW) / 167 N⋅m (17 kg⋅m; 123 lb⋅ft) (dual carburetors regular gasoline)
  - 130 PS (128 hp; 96 kW) / 172 N⋅m (18 kg⋅m; 127 lb⋅ft) (dual carburetors high octane gasoline)
- 2000GT-E/GTX-E – 2.0 L L20E I6 (fuel injected)
  - 130 PS (128 hp; 96 kW) / 167 N⋅m (17 kg⋅m; 123 lb⋅ft)
- 2000GT-R – 2.0 L S20 I6
  - 155 PS (153 hp; 114 kW) / 173 N⋅m (18 kg⋅m; 128 lb⋅ft) (regular gasoline)
  - 160 PS (158 hp; 118 kW) / 177 N⋅m (18 kg⋅m; 131 lb⋅ft) (high octane gasoline)
- 240K – 2.4 L L24 I6
  - 122 PS (120 hp; 90 kW) / 187 N⋅m (19 kg⋅m; 138 lb⋅ft) (1975–1978 European model)
  - 130 PS (128 hp; 96 kW) / 196 N⋅m (20 kg⋅m; 145 lb⋅ft)

=== Body styles ===
- Sedan
  - C110/1HC110 - Pre-facelift 1.6L sedan
  - BC111 - Facelift 1.6L sedan
  - PC110/1PC110 - Pre-facelift 1.8L sedan
  - HC111 - Facelift 1.8L sedan
  - GC110/1GC110 - Pre-facelift 2.0L sedan
  - GC111 - Facelift 2.0L sedan
  - HGC110 - Datsun 240K sedan
- Hardtop
  - KC110/1KBC110 - Pre-facelift 1.6L hardtop
  - KBC111 - Facelift 1.6L hardtop
  - KPC110/1KHC110 - Pre-facelift 1.8L hardtop
  - KHC111 - Facelift 1.8L hardtop
  - KGC110/1KGC110 - Pre-facelift 2.0L hardtop
  - KGC111 - Facelift 2.0L hardtop
  - KPGC110 - 2000GT-R
  - KHGC110 - Datsun 240K hardtop
- Wagon/Van:
  - VC110/1VBC110 - 1.6L van
  - VPC110 - 1.8L van
  - WPC110 - 1.8L wagon

== Fifth generation (C210; 1977) ==
Fifth generation
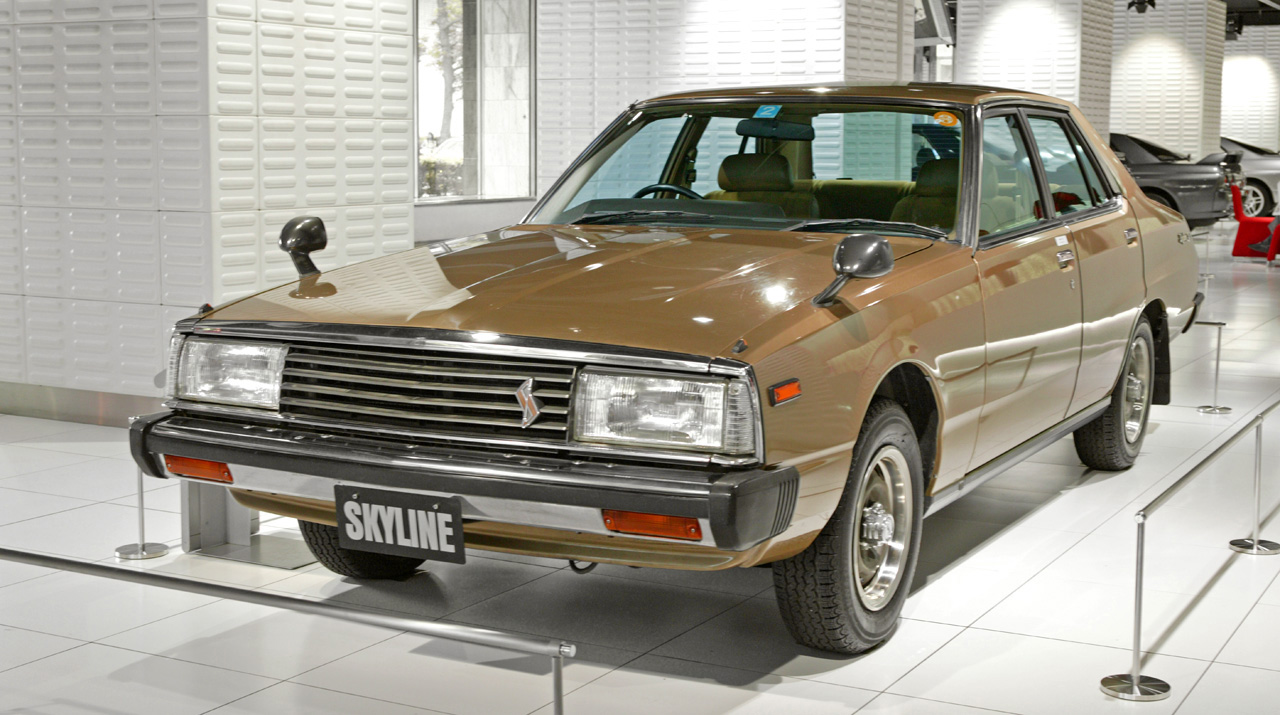
- 1979 Nissan Skyline 2000 GT-EL Sedan (C211)

Overview
- Model code: C210
- Also called: Datsun 180K/240K/280K; Datsun Skyline
- Production: August 1977 – August 1981; 539,727 units sold
- Assembly: Japan: Musashimurayama
- Designer: Shinichiro Sakurai

Body and chassis
- Body style: 4-door sedan; 2-door coupé; 5-door station wagon/light van
- Layout: Front-engine, rear-wheel-drive
- Related: Nissan Laurel (C230)

Powertrain
- Engine: Gasoline: 1595 cc L16T/S I4; 1770 cc L18E/T I4; 1770 cc Z18E/S I4; 1952 cc Z20E I4; 1998 cc L20E I6; 1998 cc L20ET turbo I6; 2393 cc L24/E I6; Diesel: 1952 cc LD20 I4; 2792 cc LD28 I6
- Transmission: 3-speed automatic; 4/5-speed manual

Dimensions
- Wheelbase: 2,515 mm (99.0 in) (4-cylinder); 2,615 mm (103.0 in) (6-cylinder)
- Length: 4,315 mm (169.9 in) (210 Wagon/Van); 4,395 mm (173.0 in) (211 Wagon/Van); 4,400 mm (173.2 in) (4-cylinder); 4,600 mm (181.1 in) (6-cylinder)
- Width: 1,625 mm (64.0 in)
- Height: 1,375–1,425 mm (54.1–56.1 in)
- Curb weight: 1,050–1,160 kg (2,314.9–2,557.4 lb) (4-cylinder); 1,175–1,265 kg (2,590.4–2,788.8 lb) (6-cylinder)

The succeeding C210 series of August 1977 continued to split the Skyline range into basic four-cylinder and six-cylinder models, the latter with a longer wheelbase and front end. This line continued through August 1981. A rare variant would be the wagon version, which had a unique styling treatment behind the rear doors, of a much smaller window than usual between the C and D pillars. The Skyline received an internal and external facelift in late 1978, which led to a change of the model code from 210 to 211. This was also when the Skyline first appeared in several European export markets, such as Germany.

The GT-EX replaced the discontinued GT-R with a turbocharged engine, the L20ET, as installed in the recently renewed Nissan Cedric/Gloria. This has been the first turbo engine to power a Japanese production vehicle. One notable aspect of the turbo versions was that they were not intercooled and there was no form of blowoff valve, only an emergency pressure release valve. As usual with Japanese cars of this period, there were four- or five-speed manuals and a three-speed automatic, with a column-shifted three-speed manual available on lower end cars and vans. The lowest powered option was the 2-liter LD20 diesel fitted to the Skyline Van 200D (VSC211D); it produces 65 PS (48 kW) at 4600 rpm.

The four-cylinder L-series engines were all switched to the cross-flow Z-series in late 1978, however the L16 lingered on for a little longer in commercial applications. The larger 2.4-liter inline-six was never offered in the domestic Japanese market; having been reserved for export. Export engines were rated in DIN horsepower, so while a Japanese-spec L24 promised 130 PS (96 kW), European market cars with the same engine only claimed 113 PS (83 kW). On the other hand, European buyers could also get the fuel injected L24E with 127 or 130 PS (93 or 96 kW) DIN, about on par with what the turbocharged GT-EX offered. Originally marketed as the Datsun 240K-GT in Europe, the fuel injected version was sold as the Datsun Skyline in most markets where it was available. It has a claimed top speed of 186 km/h (116 mph). In June 1980, the two-liter, fuel injected inline-four Z20E engine was added to the lineup, as was the 2.8 liter straight-six GT-Diesel with 91 PS (67 kW; 90 hp).

Note: The "T" designation on the L16T and L18T indicates the usage of twin carburetors. This can cause confusion, however, as Nissan typically uses the "T" designator to indicate turbocharged engines starting with the L20ET.

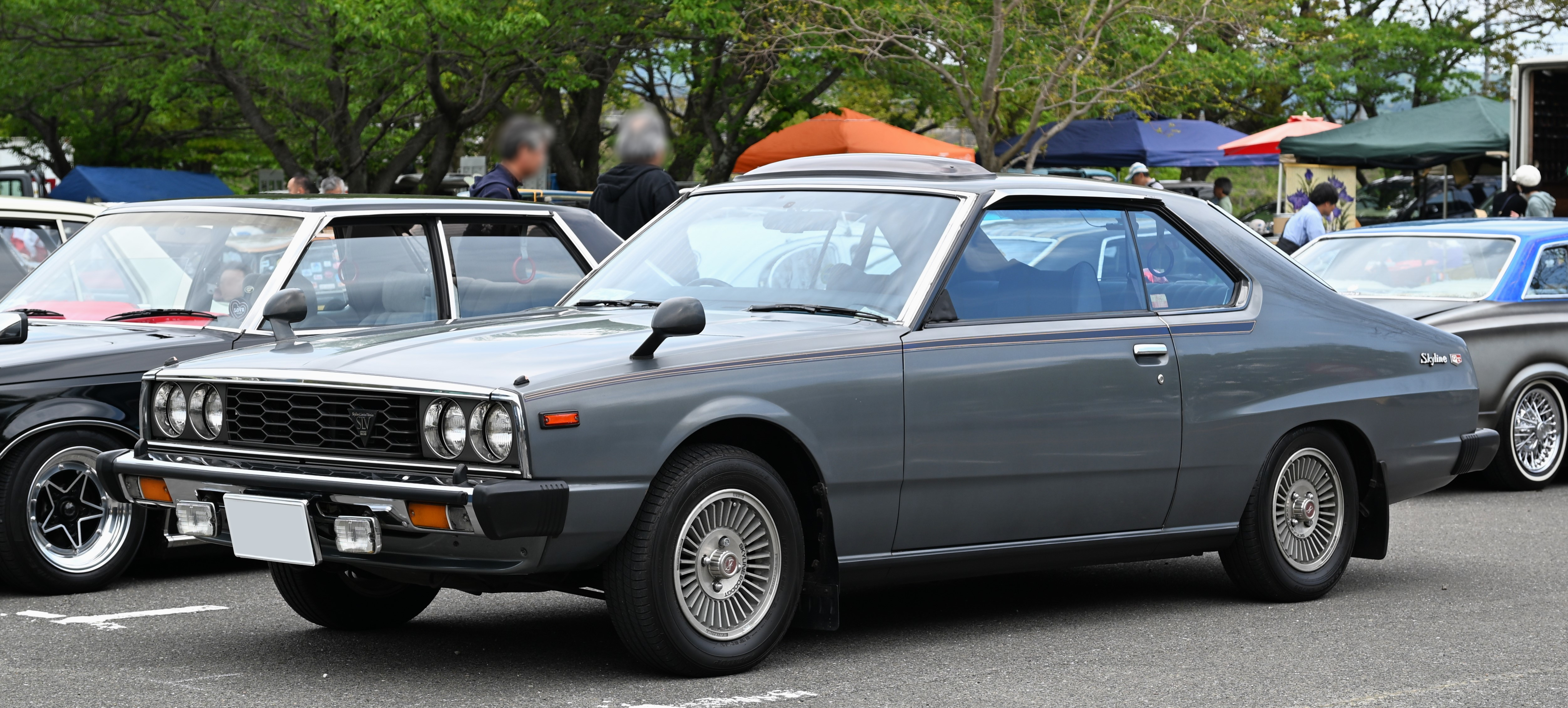
1977–1979 Nissan Skyline 2000 GT-ES coupe

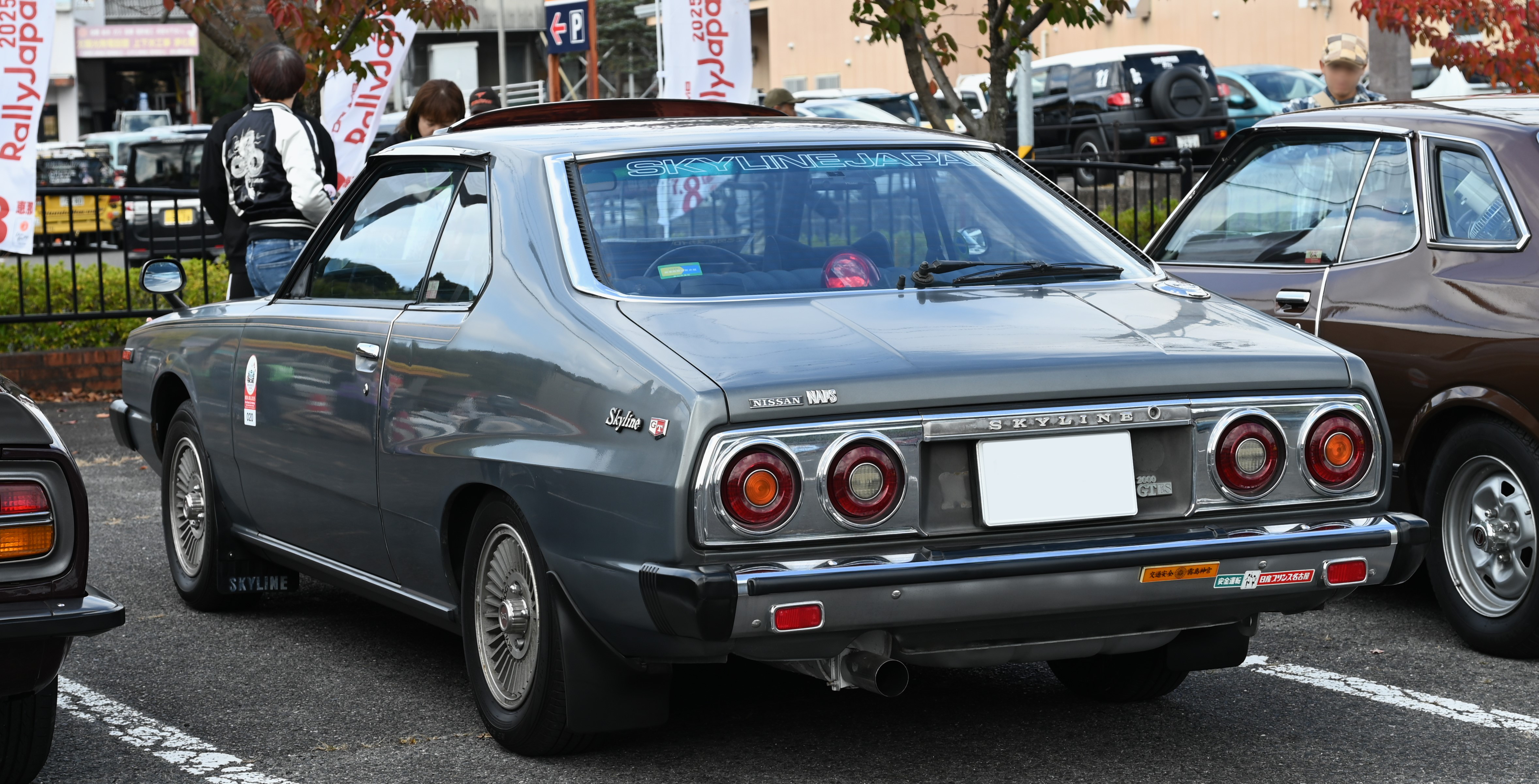
Rear view (coupe)

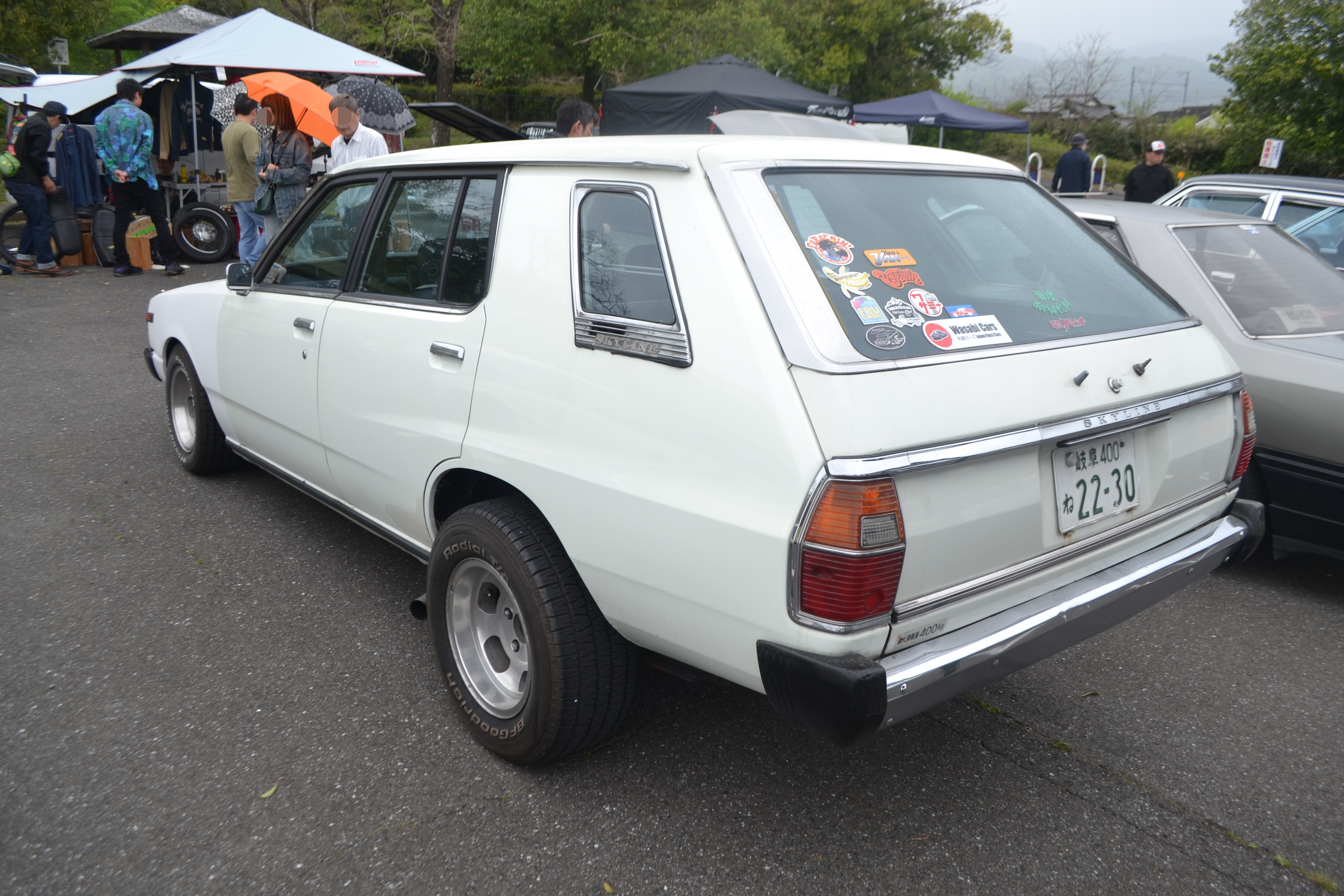
Nissan Skyline 1600 GL Van (H-VBC211)

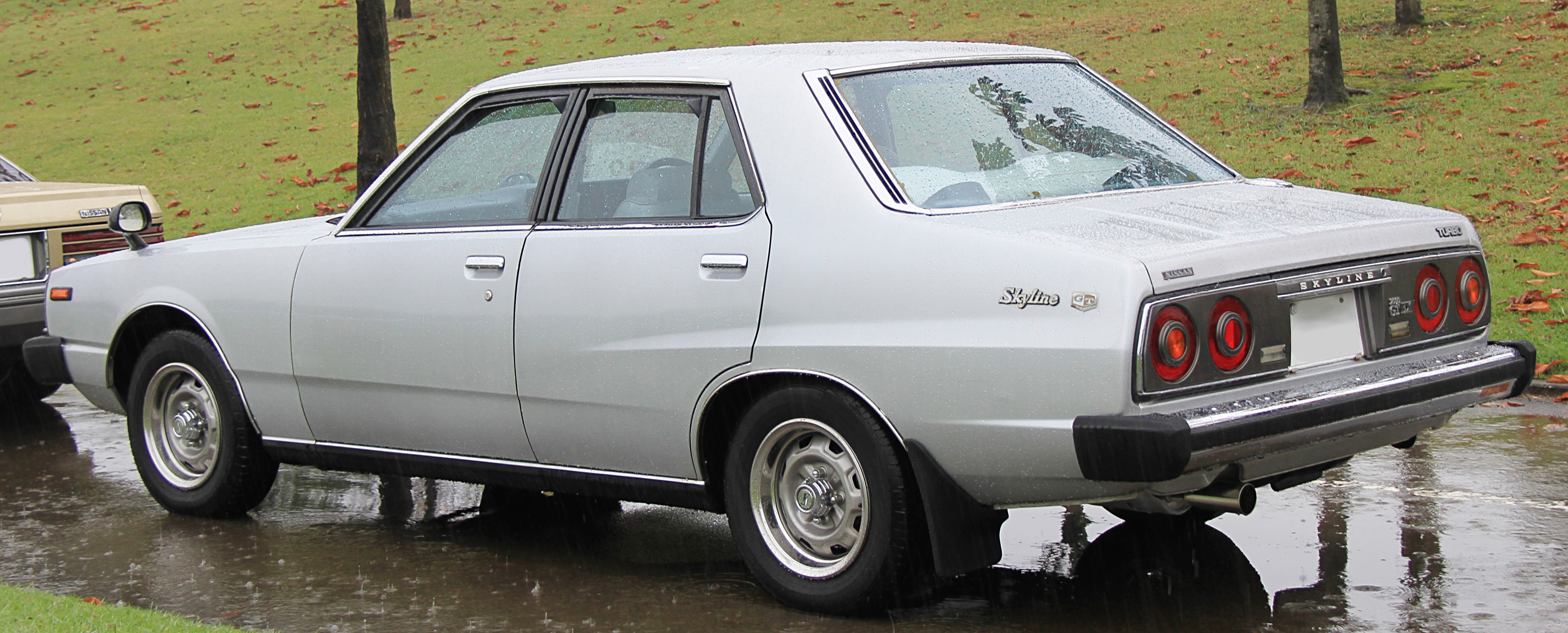
Rear view (sedan)

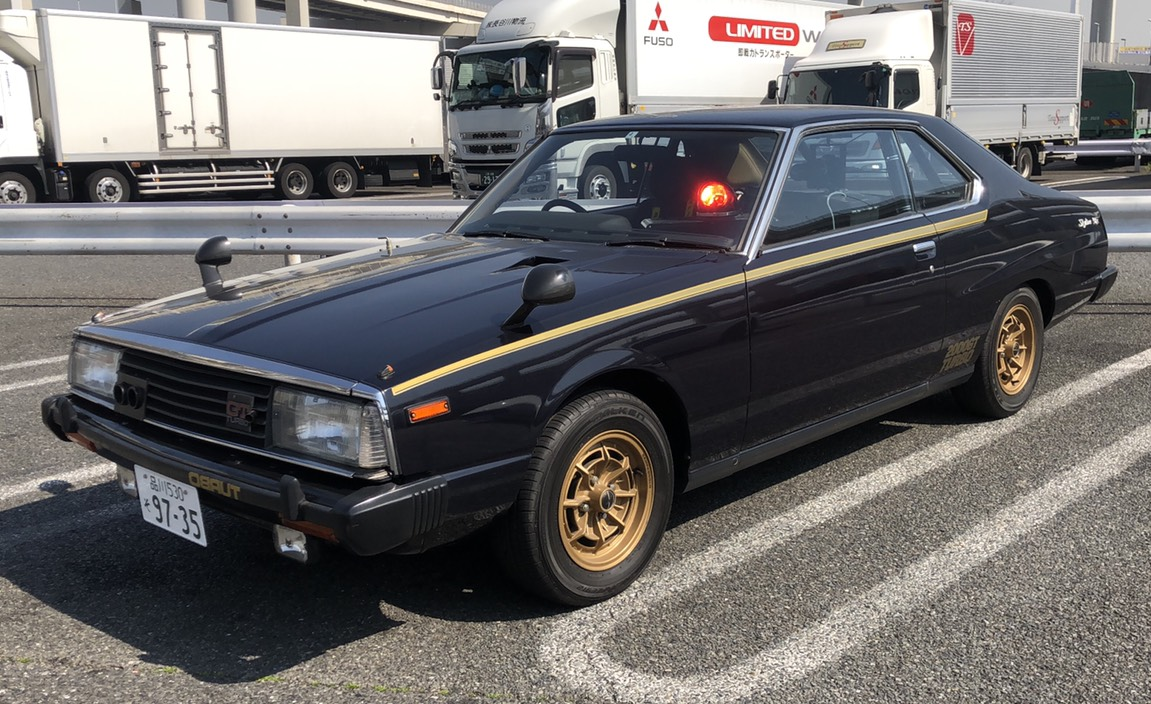
C210 2000 GT-EX Skyline. A replica of Seibu Keisatsu version

=== Models ===
Power outputs are JIS gross unless otherwise indicated:

- 1600TI – 1.6 L L16 I4, 100 PS (74 kW; 99 hp), 13.5 kg⋅m (132 N⋅m; 98 lb⋅ft)
- 1600TI – 1.6 L Z16 I4, 95 PS (70 kW; 94 hp), 13.5 kg⋅m (132 N⋅m; 98 lb⋅ft)
- 1800TI – 1.8 L Z18 I4, 105 PS (77 kW; 104 hp), 15.0 kg⋅m (147 N⋅m; 108 lb⋅ft) - the similar L18 received a claimed 77 PS DIN (57 kW; 76 hp) in European export markets.
- 1800TI-EL – 1.8 L Z18E I4, 115 PS (85 kW; 113 hp), 15.5 kg⋅m (152 N⋅m; 112 lb⋅ft)
- 2000GT-EL – 2.0 L L20E I6, 130 PS (96 kW; 128 hp), 17.0 kg⋅m (167 N⋅m; 123 lb⋅ft)
- 2000GT-EX – 2.0 L L20ET turbo I6, 145 PS (107 kW; 143 hp), 21.0 kg⋅m (206 N⋅m; 152 lb⋅ft)
- Datsun 240K-GT – 2.4 L L24 I6, 113 PS DIN (83 kW; 111 hp), 18.0 kg⋅m DIN (177 N⋅m; 130 lb⋅ft), 180 km/h (112 mph), 0–100 km/h (62 mph) in 13.5 s.

== Sixth generation (R30; 1981) ==
Sixth generation
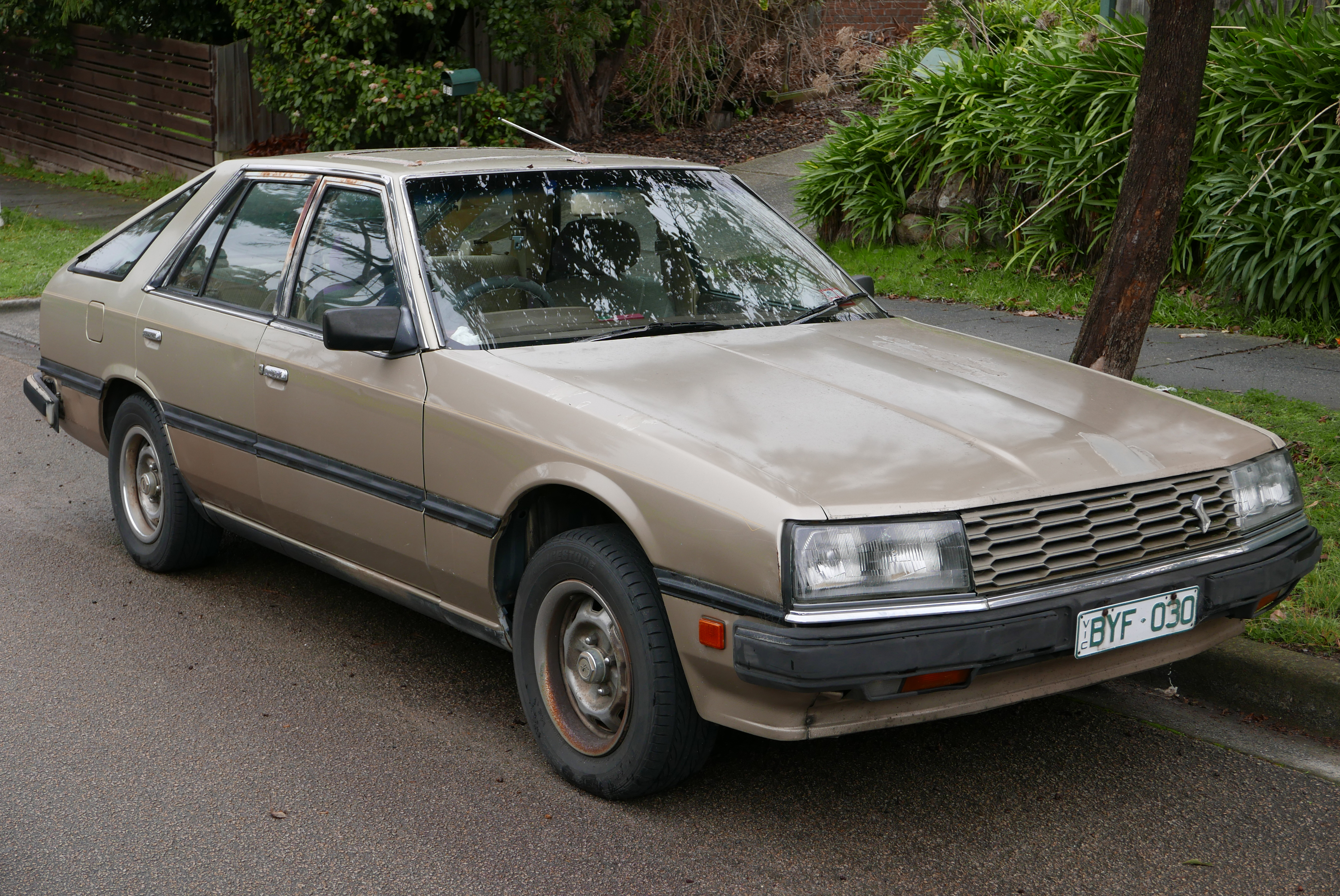
- 1983 Nissan Skyline 2.4E liftback (Australia)

Overview
- Model code: R30
- Production: August 1981– July 1985; 1982–1987 (South Africa); 406,432 units sold
- Assembly: Japan: Musashimurayama; South Africa: Rosslyn, Gauteng (NSA)
- Designer: Shinichiro Sakurai

Body and chassis
- Body style: 4-door sedan; 2-door coupé; 5-door liftback; 5-door station wagon
- Layout: Front-engine, rear-wheel-drive
- Related: Nissan Laurel (C31); Nissan Leopard (F30)

Powertrain
- Engine: Gasoline: 1770 cc Z18S I4; 1809 cc CA18E I4; 1952 cc Z20E I4; 1990 cc FJ20E DOHC I4; 1990 cc FJ20ET DOHC turbo I4; 1998 cc L20E I6; 1998 cc L20ET turbo I6; 2393 cc L24 I6; 2753 cc L28/L28E I6; Diesel: 1998 cc LD20 I4; 2792 cc LD28 I6
- Transmission: 3/4-speed automatic; 4/5-speed manual

Dimensions
- Wheelbase: 2,615 mm (103.0 in)
- Length: 4,620 mm (181.9 in)
- Width: 1,675 mm (65.9 in)
- Height: 1,385 mm (54.5 in)

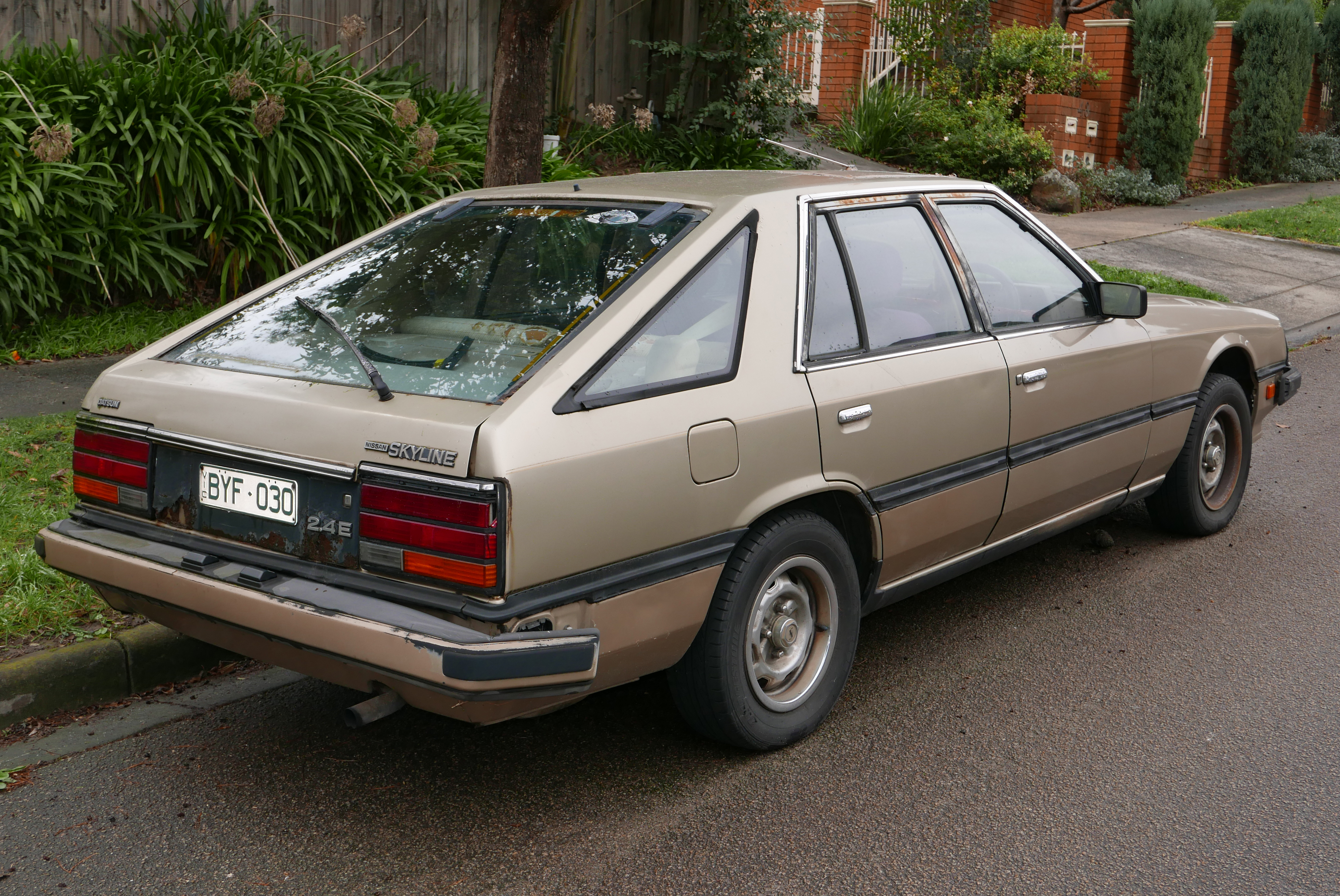
1983 Nissan Skyline liftback (Australia)

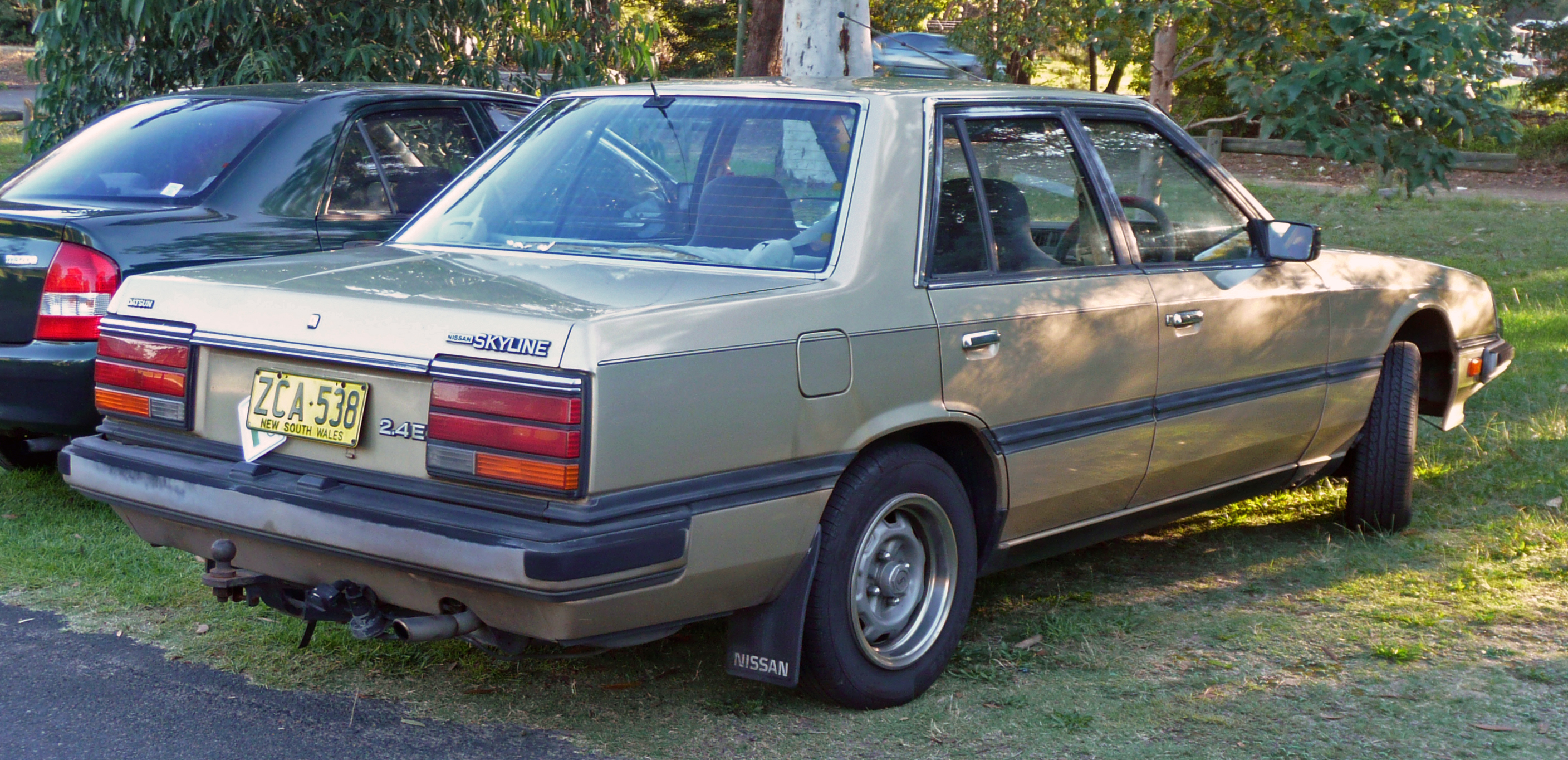
1981–1983 Nissan Skyline sedan (Australia)

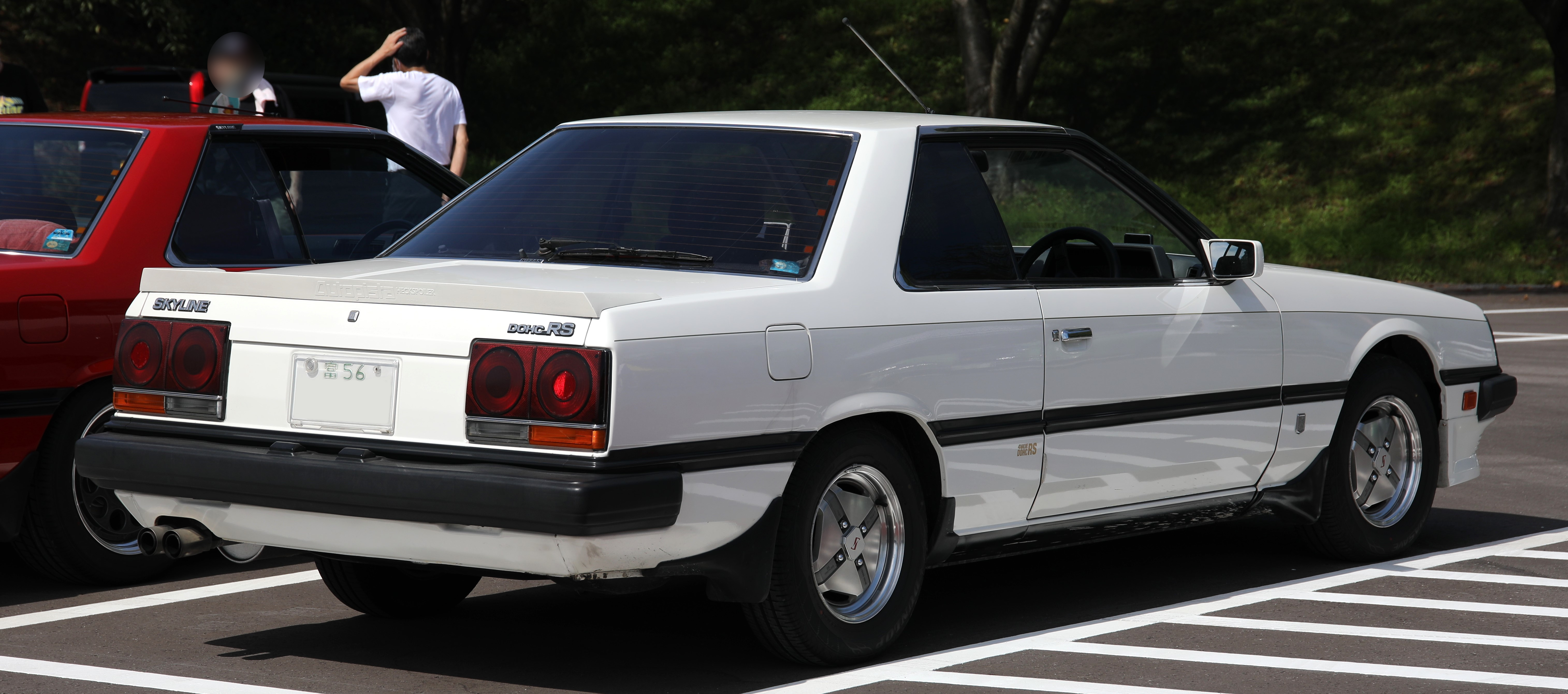
1981–1983 Nissan Skyline coupé (Japan)

The names were brought into line with the home Japanese and worldwide markets with the launch of the R30 series in August 1981, which was built on a C31 Laurel platform. Unlike preceding generations, four- and six-cylinder versions now shared a front end of the same length. The R30 was available as a two-door hardtop coupé, a four-door sedan, a five-door Liftback (available only in the R30 generation), or a four-door station wagon. In all, there were 26 variations of the R30 Skyline available.

All versions with the exception of the wagon were usually fitted with the four round tail lights that had become a regular feature to the Skyline's design. The wagon had different tail lights, headlights, and no turbo or six-cylinder versions available. It more closely resembled a Nissan Sunny than a Skyline. The two-door coupé had a hardtop, pillarless design, and featured roll-down quarter windows for the rear seat passengers (a styling feature of the previous C10, C110, and C211 coupés), while four-door versions had a traditional sedan body style with framed windows. The crease that appeared over the rear wheels beginning with the second generation, referred to as the "surf line", no longer appeared starting with this generation.

Various engine configurations were available, initially ranging from the top-of-the-line 103 kW SOHC 6-cylinder turbo L20ET to the 4-cylinder Z18S and 6-cylinder LD28 diesel versions at the other end of the scale. The all-new 16-valve DOHC FJ20 engine debuted in late 1981, and was the first four-cylinder engine from any Japanese manufacturer to employ more than two valves per cylinder (see below). Some of the top spec models featured adjustable suspension dampers that could be adjusted while driving, this was another first for mass-produced JDM vehicles. Nissan Glorias and Laurels also used the L series engines, as well as some diesel (Laurel only) variants.

The R30 range was facelifted in August 1983 with various changes across the board; for example four-wheel disc brakes were now standard issue, instead of being optional for lower-spec models. Trim specifications were revised and the 4-cylinder Z18S engine was replaced with the newer CA18E. Features included upgraded interior trim, new front and rear bumpers, door-mounted wing mirrors (replacing the old 'hockey stick' fender mirrors), and smoked tail lights.

During 1983 the Paul Newman Version R30 was released to commemorate the association between Nissan and the actor Paul Newman, who used to appear in promotional material, as well as race for the company during the late-1970s and early-1980s. The Newman Skyline was simply a top spec GT-ES turbo with signature embroidery and decals.

Export markets also received some larger (albeit less powerful) engines, in the form of 2.4 and 2.8 liter inline-sixes with Hitachi double carburetors, producing 120 PS (88 kW) or 139 PS (102 kW). The 2.8 was added in September 1982.

=== Australia ===
Nissan Australia launched the R30 sedan in November 1981, with standard air conditioning, AM/FM radio cassette stereo, digital clock, intermittent wipers, five-speed manual or optional three-speed automatic. This was fully imported from Japan. The Liftbacks were released to the market in August 1982. The facelift model launched in Australia during November 1983. Notably, configurations of the R30 sold in Australia and New Zealand were missing the traditional hotplate tail lights, instead opting for more conventional styling.

=== South Africa ===
When entering the South African market in late 1982, Skylines were still sold as Datsuns. About a year after being introduced, the Nissan changeover took place. In addition to 2-liter models (sedans and liftbacks), the R30 Datsun Skyline was also available with the 2.8-liter "six" in the GTX Hardtop (the only coupé on offer). Along with the Nissan nameplate the four-door 2.8 GLX was added, using a two-barrel Hitachi carburetor. There was also a GL version, and in May 1984 the four-door GT version arrived. This was sportier than the GLX, benefitting from the GTX suspension and a Weber carburetor, but cost less than the GTX due to less equipment and having drums at the rear. The South African range was lightly facelifted for the 1986 model year, with a luxurious 2.8 SGL replacing the GLX and with the GT discontinued. Automatic transmission became available in the GTX Hardtop and also in the top-of-the-line SGLi sedan (which was not offered with a manual). The R30 was replaced by the R31 Skyline in mid-1987.

2-liter cars have the four-cylinder L20B engine; equipment levels include GL, and GLE-X, and there was also the Skyline 1800 L at the bottom of the ladder.

=== RS ===
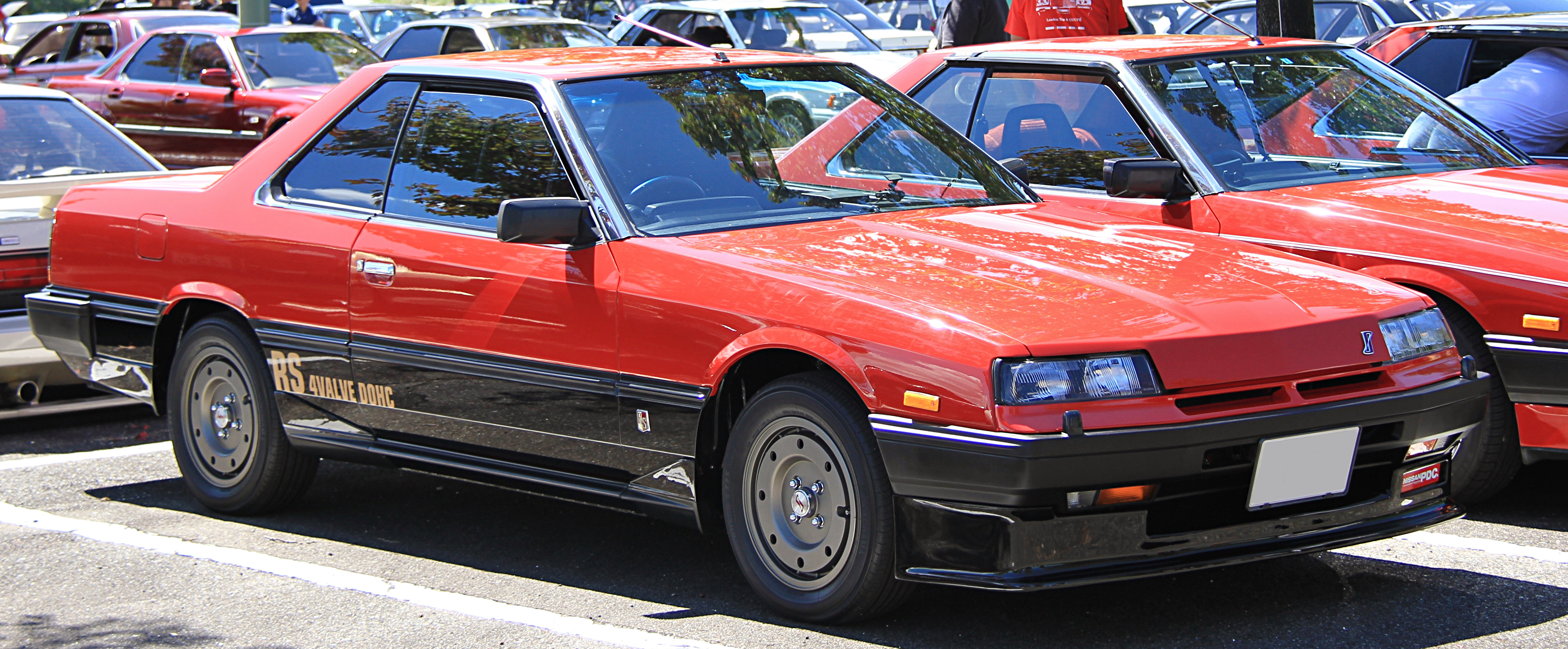
1983–1985 Nissan Skyline RS coupé (DR30), nicknamed "Iron Mask" for its distinctive front end treatment

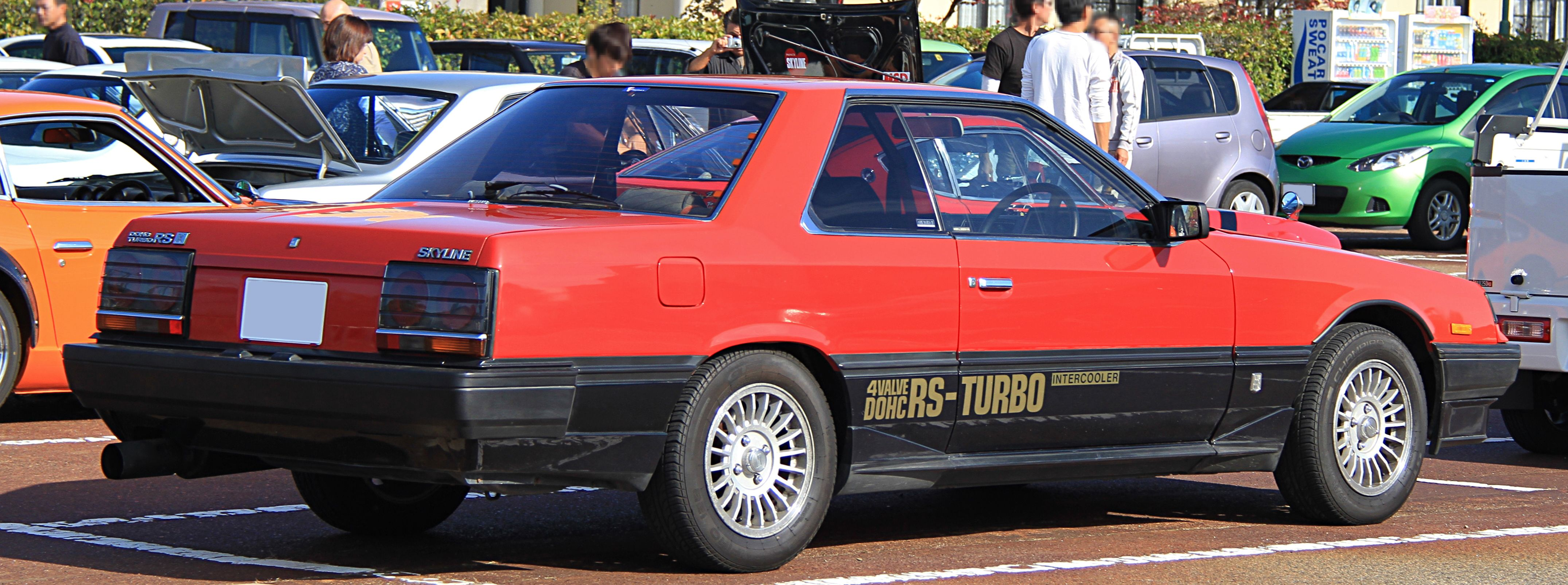
1983–1985 Nissan Skyline 2000 RS-X Turbo coupé (DR30, Japan)

Although making about the same power as the L20ET-powered GT-ES models, the version of the Skyline initially known as the 2000RS was released on 2 October 1981 as more of a stripped-down lightweight racer, without as many luxury extras included (quoted curb weight was only 1,130 kg (2,491 lb)). These were equipped with the naturally aspirated 4-valve-per-cylinder DOHC FJ20E engine generating 110 kW (150 PS; 148 hp) of power at 6,000 rpm and 181 N⋅m (133 lb⋅ft) of torque at 4,800 rpm. The official Nissan chassis designation for all FJ20-powered models was DR30.

In February 1983 the DR30 range received a significant boost in performance with the introduction of the turbocharged FJ20ET engine in the 2000RS-Turbo. Front brakes were also significantly upgraded to cope with the power increase. Now with 140 kW (190 PS; 188 hp) of power at 6,400 rpm (measured on a gross basis) and 225 N⋅m (166 lb⋅ft) of torque at 4,800 rpm on tap, the FJ20ET enjoyed new-found prestige as the most powerful Japanese production engine of its era.

Nissan sought to elevate the status of the DR30 Skyline as their new flagship model in light of this success, and it received a generous amount of changes to distinguish it from lesser Skyline models in August 1983. Interior equipment was significantly upgraded to now include electric windows, air conditioning and power steering as standard in the new RS-X model (for Extra) with an increased curb weight of around 1,235 kg (2,723 lb) it also included a driver's seat with multi-way power lumbar adjustment, anti-skid control, fog lamps, rear deck spoiler and other features such as dimmable instrument cluster lighting; gone were the days of the spartan, stripped-out race interior, although this could still be specified at time of purchase. But by far the most striking change to the RS was the new unique front end treatment, nicknamed Tekkamen (鉄仮面) or Iron Mask by fans for its distinctive look. The headlights were considerably slimmer, and instead of a conventional grille the hood now sloped down to two narrow slits above a facelifted front bumper and airdam.

Further enhancements were made for 1984, most notably the addition of an air-to-air intercooler allowing the compression ratio to be increased from 8.0:1 to 8.5:1 with revised turbocharger exhaust housing to the FJ20ET powered model increasing output to 205 PS (151 kW; 202 hp) of power at 6,400 rpm (gross) and 245 N⋅m (181 lb⋅ft) of torque at 4,400 rpm. The intercooled model was nicknamed the Turbo C. The Turbo C formed the basis for the Super Silhouette race car built by GT-R Works and sponsored by Tomica and run in the All Japan Sports Prototype Championship under FIA Group C regulations.

An automatic transmission option was also added 1984. Changes to the "Plasma Spark" ignition system followed in early 1985 towards the end of R30 production.

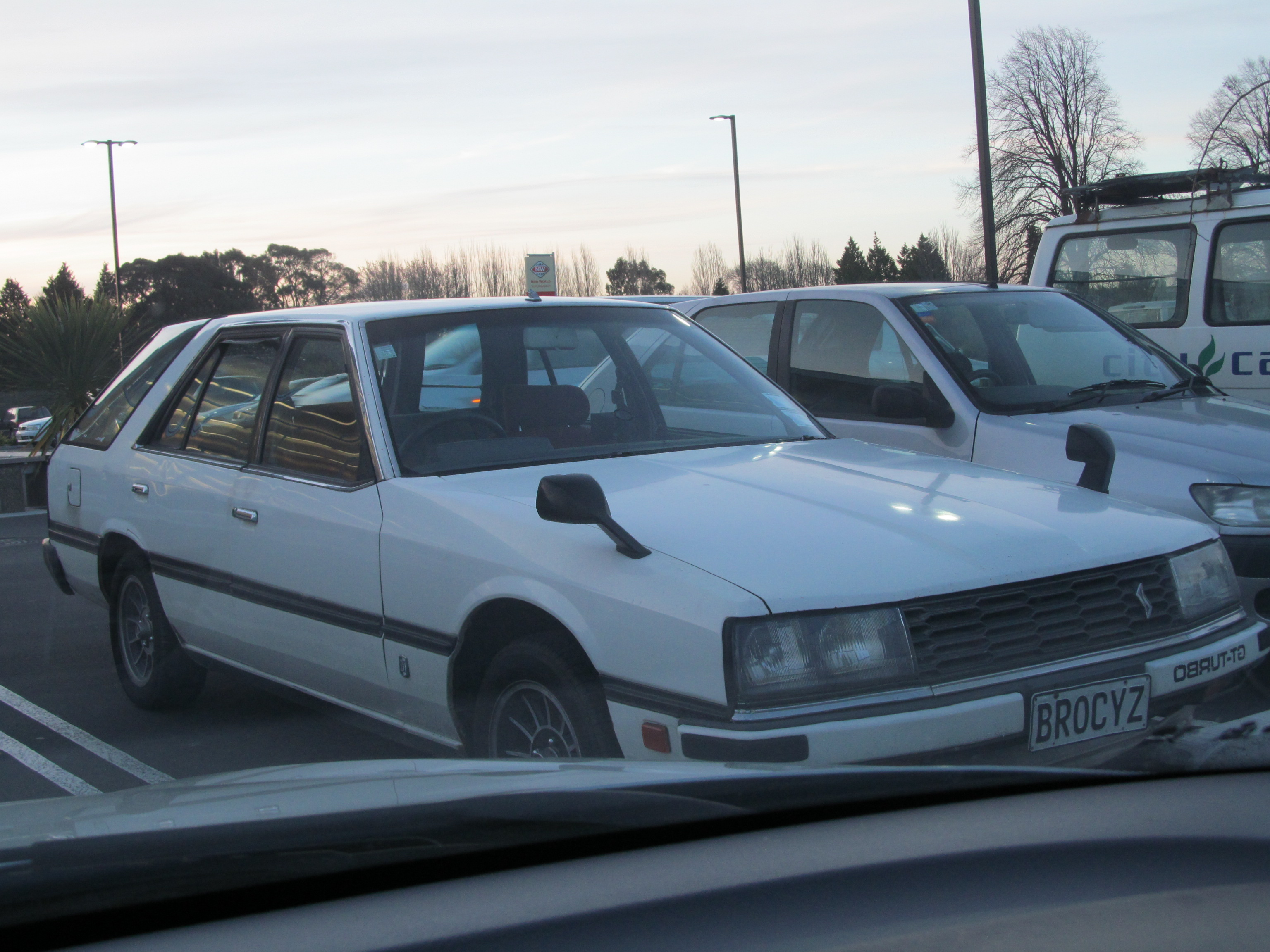
1987 Nissan Skyline 2.0D van (R30, Japan)

To this day the FJ20-powered R30 Skyline remains a cult car both at home and overseas (there are still dedicated "one make" drag racing events for this model in Japan), and is credited with rejuvenating the Skyline brand in the early 1980s. It also paved the way for the eventual re-introduction of the legendary GT-R badge, markedly absent since the end of C110 Skyline production in 1973.

The DR30 achieved success in Australian touring car racing during the mid-1980s. The factory backed Nissan Team made its Group A debut in the opening round of the 1986 Australian Touring Car Championship, and over the 10 round series, lead driver George Fury would win four of the rounds and it was only unreliability in the first two rounds that cost Fury the title, finishing only 5 points behind the Volvo 240T of Robbie Francevic. Fury then went on to finish second to the BMW of Jim Richards in the 1986 Australian Endurance Championship, winning four of the six rounds, though failures to finish in the opening round at Amaroo Park in Sydney, as well as a DNF at the Bathurst 1000 at Bathurst cost him the title. Team driver Garry Scott put the DR30 on pole for the James Hardie 1000 before going on to finish third with young charger Glenn Seton. Despite missing out on the drivers' title, Nissan won the 1986 Australian Manufacturers' Championship from BMW. Fury finished off 1986 by finishing second to the V8 Holden Commodore VK of Allan Grice in the Group A support race for the Australian Grand Prix in Adelaide.

Fury was joined in 1987 Australian Touring Car Championship by Glenn Seton. While Fury had a frustrating first half of the championship, Seton battled it out with the BMW M3 of Richards for the title. The series came down to the last race at Sydney's Oran Park Raceway where Richards used the nimble M3 to defeat Seton and win his second ATCC in three years. With Fury finishing third in the championship, this saw Nissan sharing victory with BMW in the 1987 Australian Manufacturers' Championship. The final competitive race for the Peter Jackson Nissan DR30s came in the Group A support race for the 1987 Australian Grand Prix in Adelaide where Fury again finished second behind the Ford Sierra RS500 of Dick Johnson.

The 340 bhp (254 kW; 345 PS) DR30 continued to be used by privateer racers in Australian touring car racing until 1989.

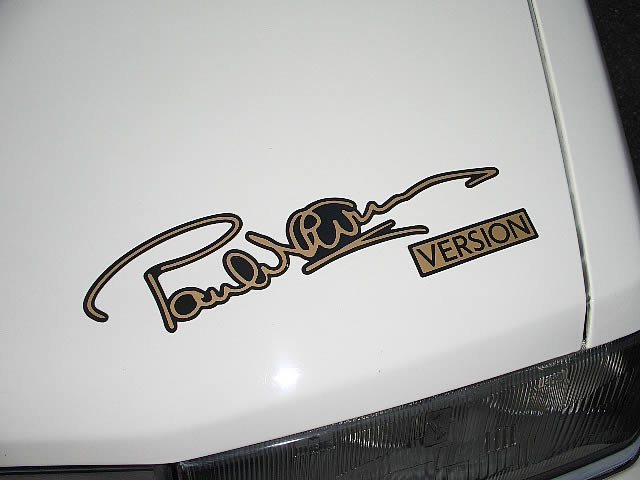
Paul Newman Version hood decal

Models: (Japan)

- 1800TI – 1.8 L Z18S SOHC I4, 105 PS (77 kW; 104 hp), later models 1.8 L CA18E SOHC I4, 115 PS (85 kW; 113 hp)
- 2000TI – 2.0 L CA20E SOHC I4
- 2000TI – 2.0 L Z20E SOHC I4
- 2000GT and Passage – 2.0 L L20E SOHC I6
- 2000GT Turbo, Passage and Paul Newman Version – 2.0 L L20ET turbo I6, 140 PS (103 kW; 138 hp)
- RS – 2.0 L FJ20E DOHC I4, 150 PS (110 kW; 148 hp), 181 N⋅m (133 lb⋅ft)
- RS-X and RS-X Turbo C – 2.0 L FJ20ET DOHC turbo I4, 190–205 PS (140–151 kW; 187–202 hp), 225–245 N⋅m (166–181 lb⋅ft)
- 200D GT – 2.0 L LD20 SOHC I4 diesel
- 280D GT – 2.8 L LD28 SOHC I6 diesel

== Seventh generation (R31; 1985) ==
Seventh generation
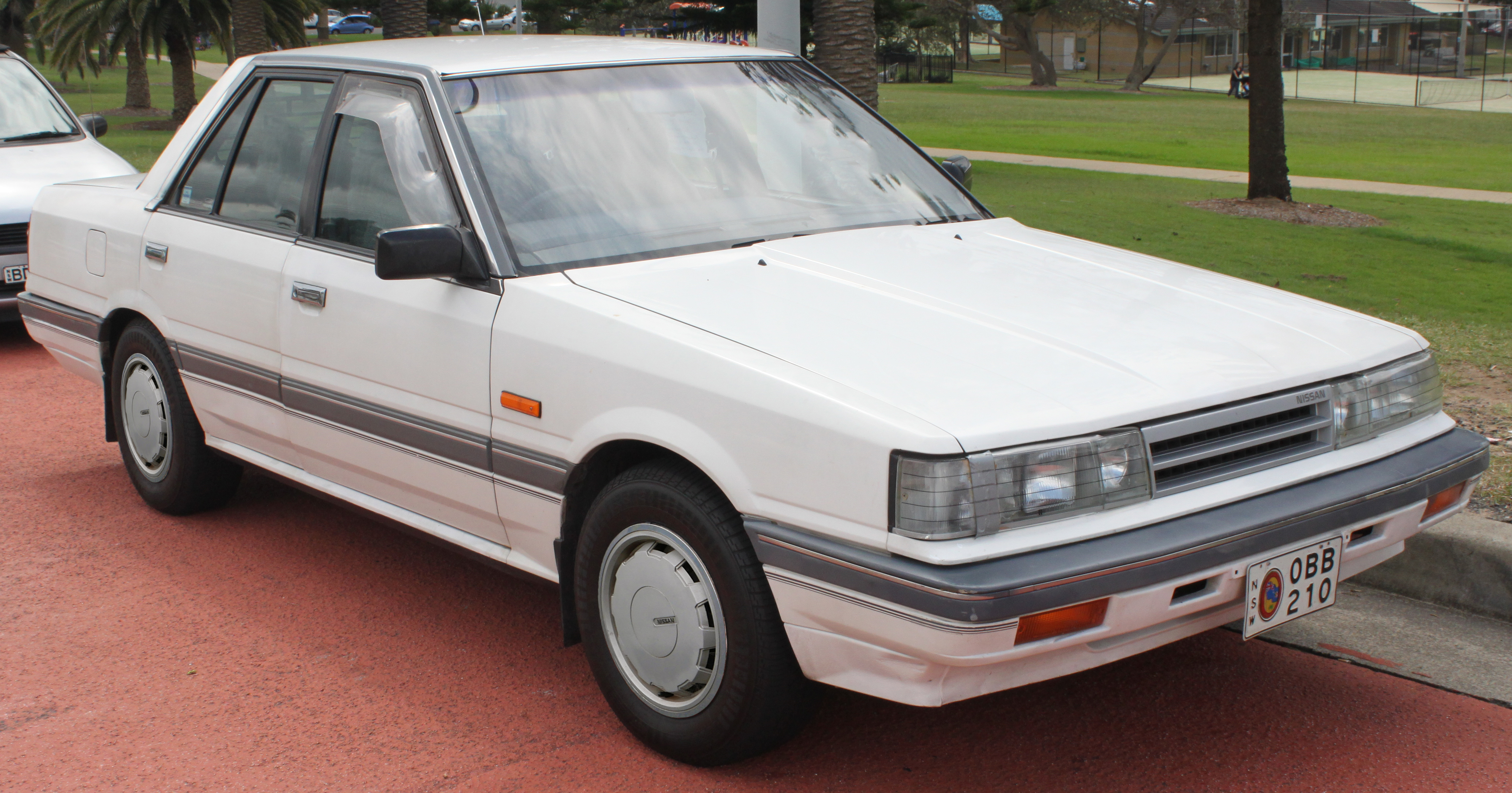
- 1986 Nissan Skyline GXE sedan (Australia)

Overview
- Model code: R31
- Also called: Nissan Pintara (Australian 4-cylinder models)
- Production: July 1985 – April 1989 (Japan); 1986–1990 (Australia); 309,716 units sold
- Assembly: Japan: Musashimurayama; South Africa: Rosslyn, Gauteng (NSA); Australia: Clayton (Nissan Australia)
- Designer: Shinichiro Sakurai; Naganori Ito

Body and chassis
- Body style: 4-door sedan; 4-door hardtop; 2-door coupé (1986–1990); 5-door station wagon (1986–1990)
- Layout: Front-engine, rear-wheel-drive
- Related: Nissan Laurel (C32); Nissan Leopard (F31); Nissan Pintara

Powertrain
- Engine: Gasoline: 1.8 L CA18I I4; 2.0 L CA20E I4; 2.0 L RB20E I6; 2.0 L RB20ET turbo I6; 2.0 L RB20DE I6; 2.0 L RB20DET turbo I6; 2.0 L RB20DET-R turbo I6; 3.0 L RB30S I6; 3.0 L RB30E I6; 3.0 L RB30DE I6; Diesel: 2.8 L RD28 I6
- Transmission: 4-speed automatic; 5-speed manual

Dimensions
- Wheelbase: 2,610 mm (102.8 in)
- Length: 4,590 mm (180.7 in) (pre-facelift sedan/wagon); 4,650 mm (183.1 in) (pre-facelift hardtop); 4,660 mm (183.5 in) (coupé/facelift sedan/hardtop/wagon)
- Width: 1,690 mm (66.5 in)
- Height: 1,365 mm (53.7 in) (coupé); 1,385–1,395 mm (54.5–54.9 in) (hardtop); 1,395–1,435 mm (54.9–56.5 in) (sedan); 1,410 mm (55.5 in) (wagon)
- Curb weight: 1,200–1,420 kg (2,646–3,131 lb)

Chronology
- Successor: Nissan Laurel Altima

The R31 Skyline of 1985 was a natural evolution on the R30 shape, and also this one was loosely based on the Laurel platform (C32). The design was slightly larger and squarer than previous Skylines. It was available as a Sedan, Hardtop sedan, Coupé and station wagon. Affectionately known as the "Seventhsu" or simply "7th Sukairain" by owners, due to it being the 7th-generation Skyline.

The R31 Skyline coupe and wagon were added in 1986.

The R31 Skyline introduced many new technologies and features. The HR31 was the first Skyline to be equipped with the new RB-series of engines. The HR31 RB engines are often referred to as "Red Top" engines because of the red cam covers. There were three variants. The earliest series of DOHC, 24-valve, RB engines used the NICS (Nissan Induction Control System) injection system with 12 very small intake runners, and a butterfly system to divide the intake ports in half for better low RPM performance. Later versions used ECCS (Electronically Concentrated Control System) engine management, discarded the twelve tiny runners for six much larger ones (though the cylinder heads still retained twelve individual intake ports separated by casting), and received a slightly larger turbocharger. Nissan's RD28, a 2.8 straight-six engine, featured for a diesel option. Another technological first for the R31 was the introduction of Nissan's proprietary four-wheel steering system, dubbed HICAS (High Capacity Active Steering). The R31 series were also the only models in the Skyline family to feature a four-door hardtop variation. These models were generally badged as the Passage GT; a luxury approach of this variation was also used by its platform twin Laurel on a shorter wheelbase.

Pre-facelift

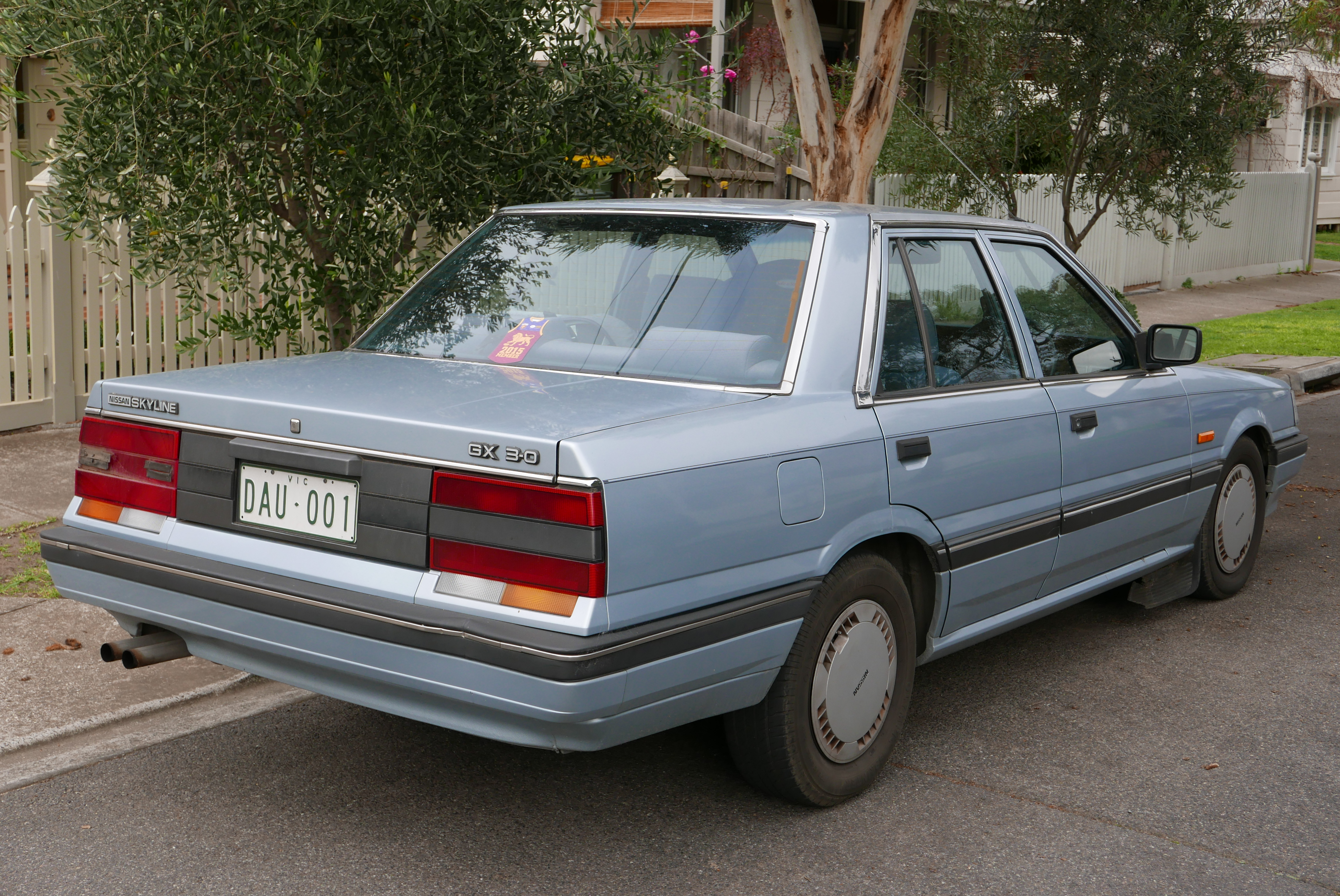
Rear view

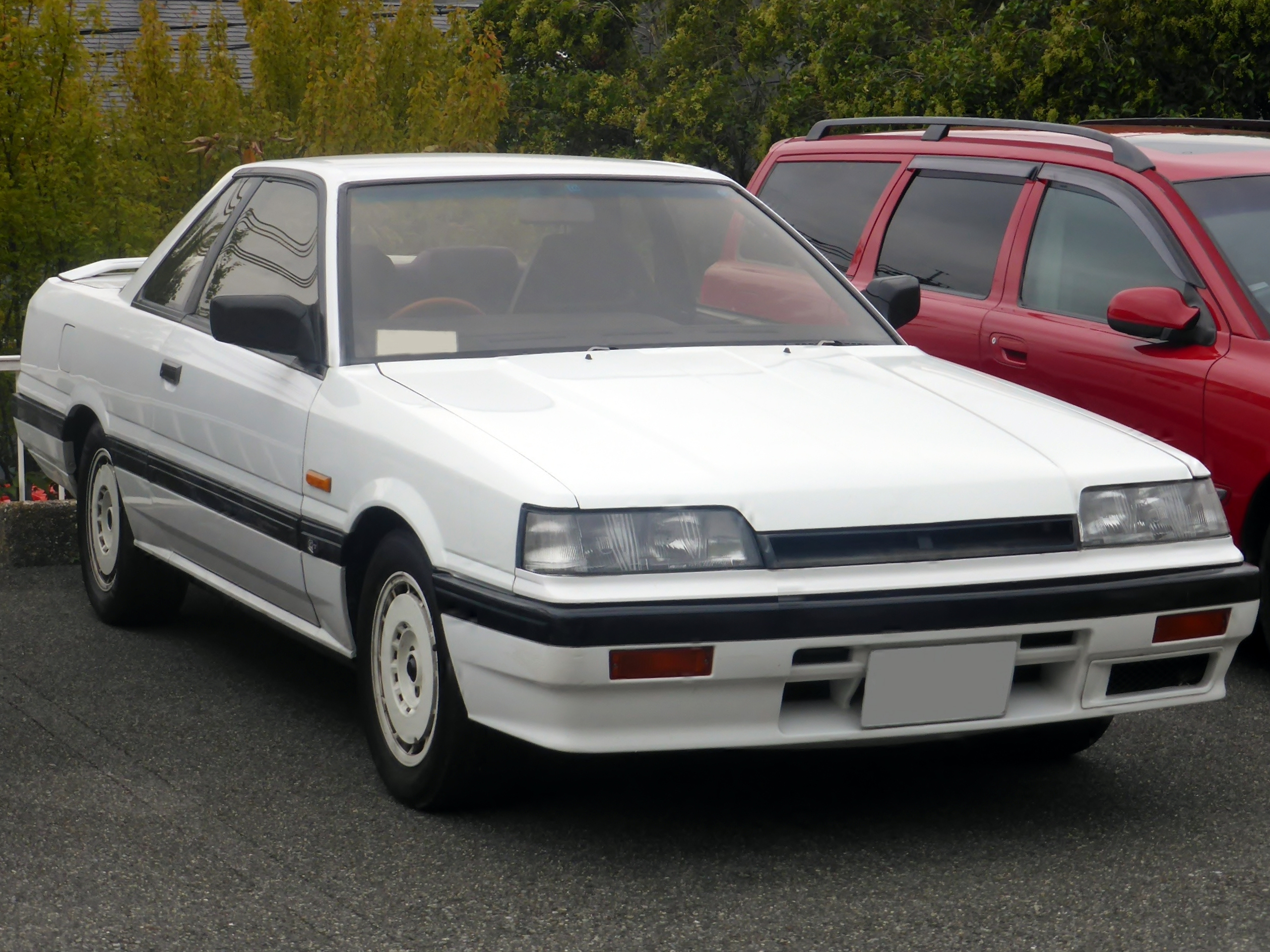
1986–1987 Nissan Skyline GTS-X coupé

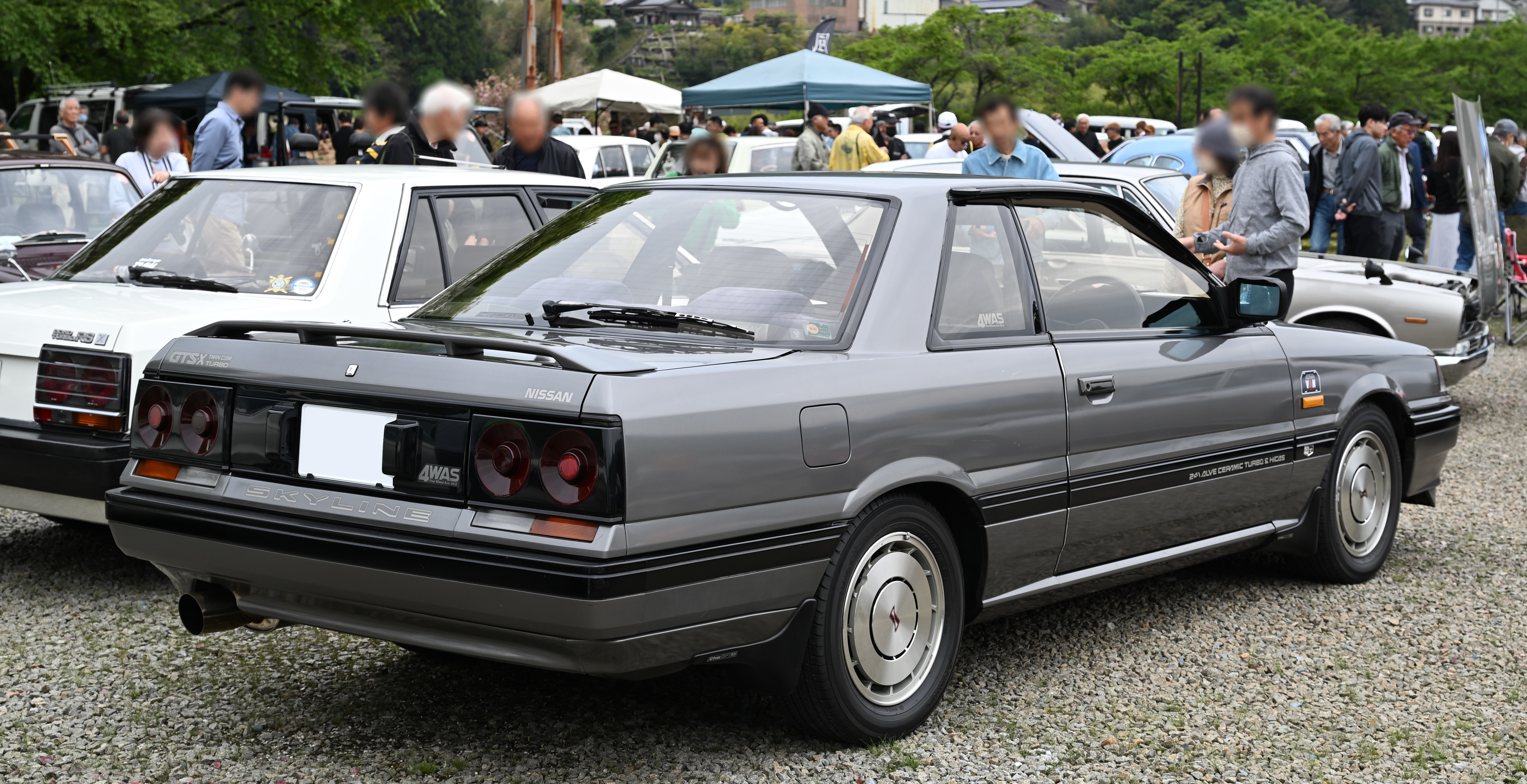
Rear view (coupé)

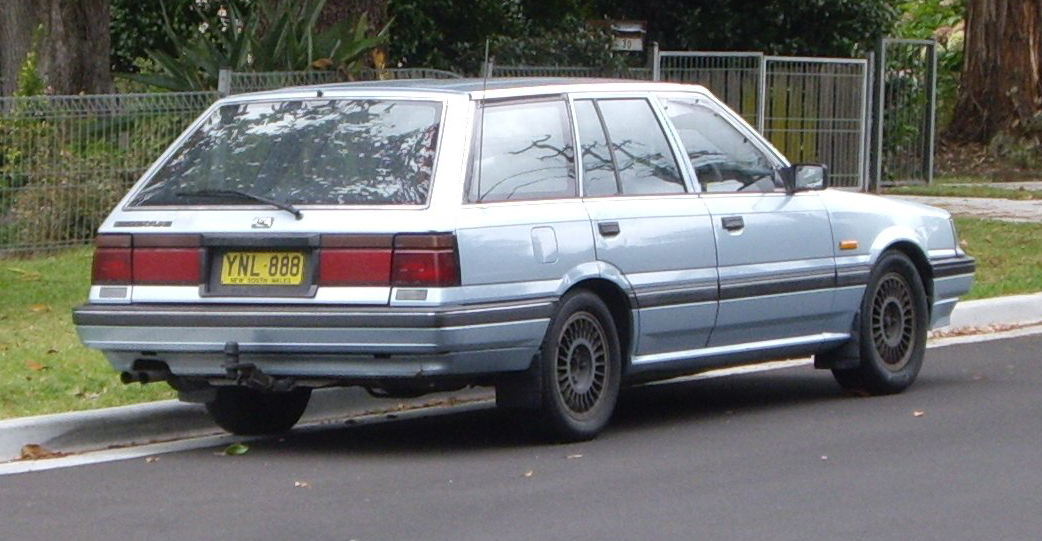
Rear view (wagon)

Facelift

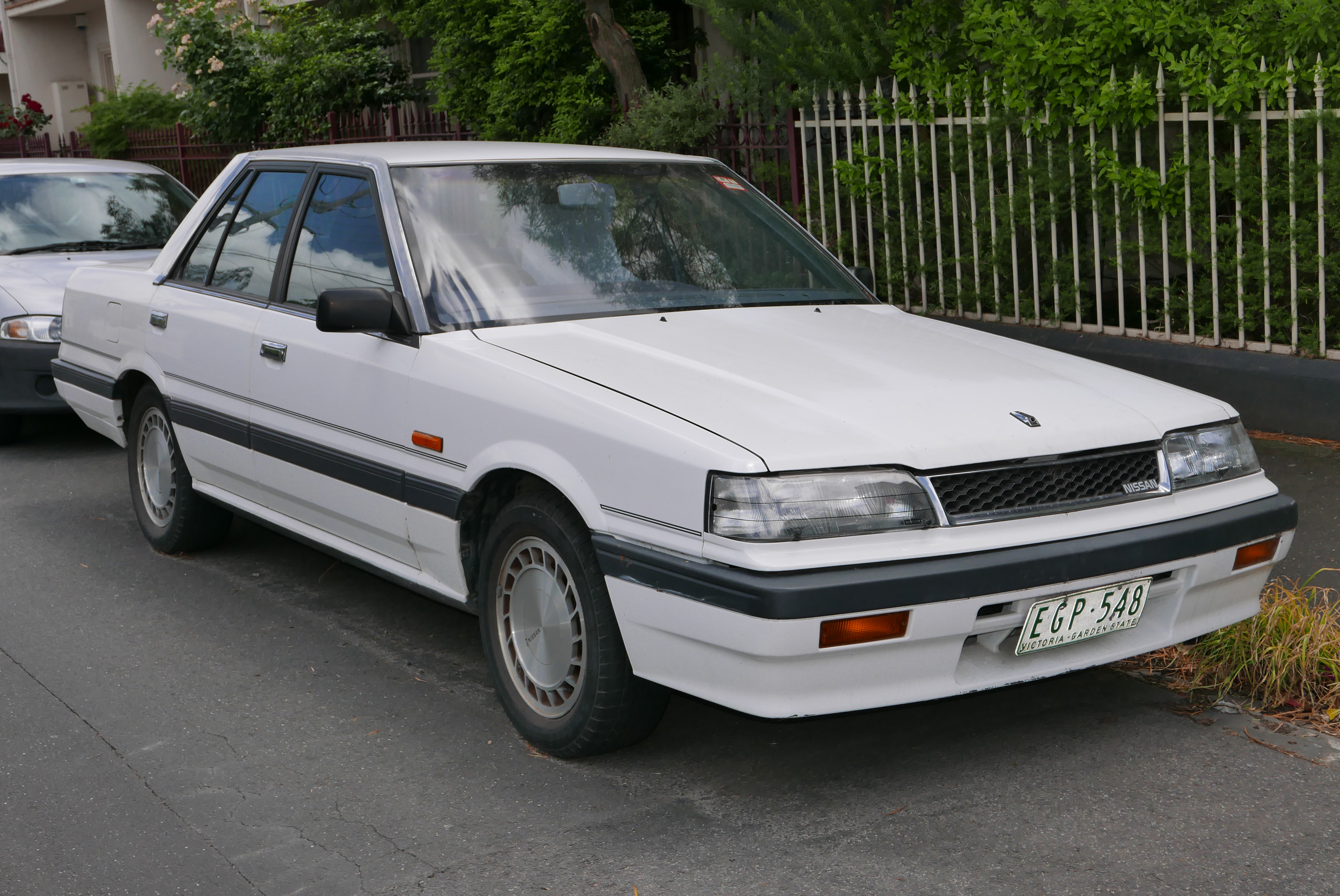
1987–1990 Nissan Skyline Ti sedan (facelift)

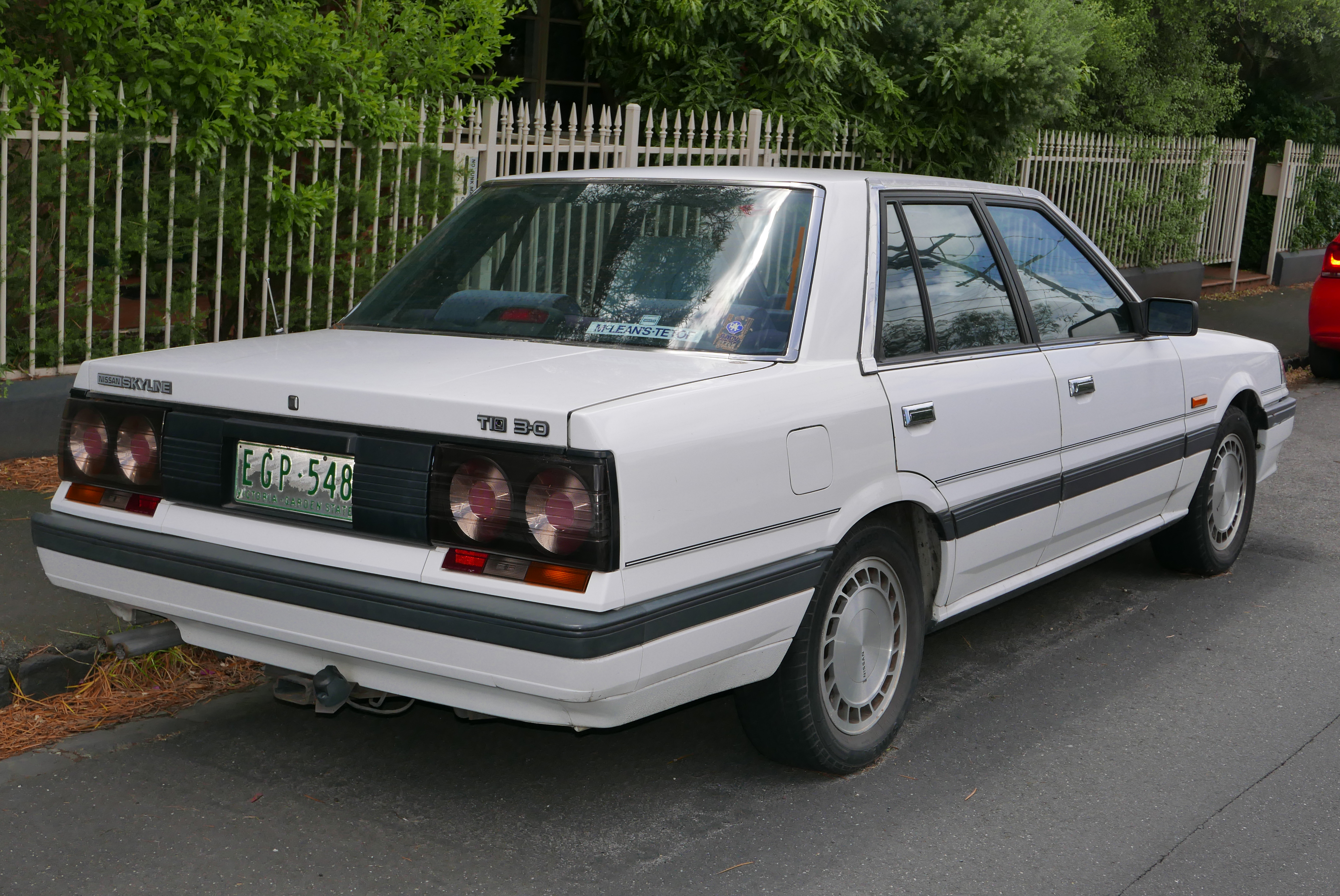
Rear view (sedan; facelift)

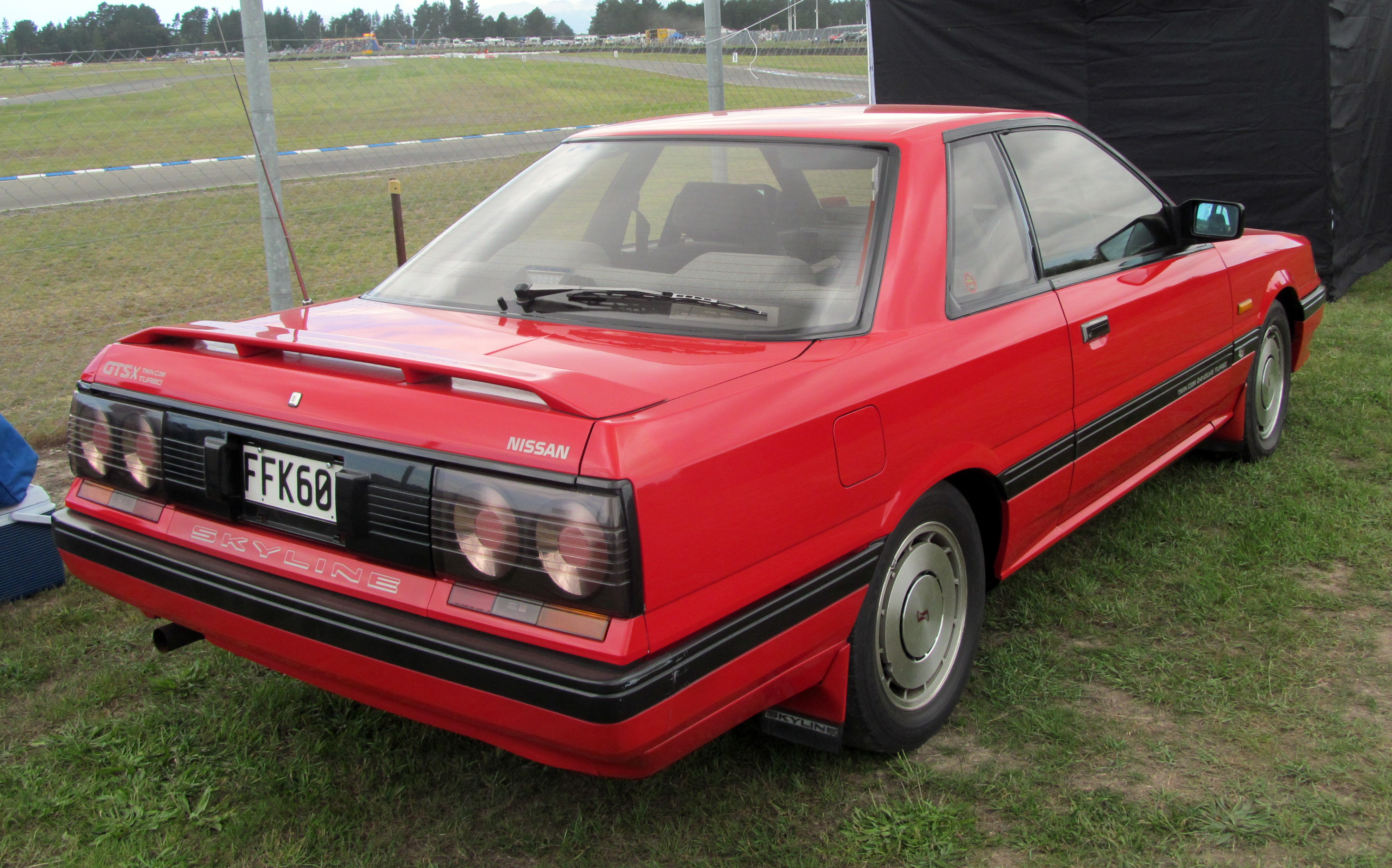
1987 Nissan Skyline GTS-X coupé (facelift)

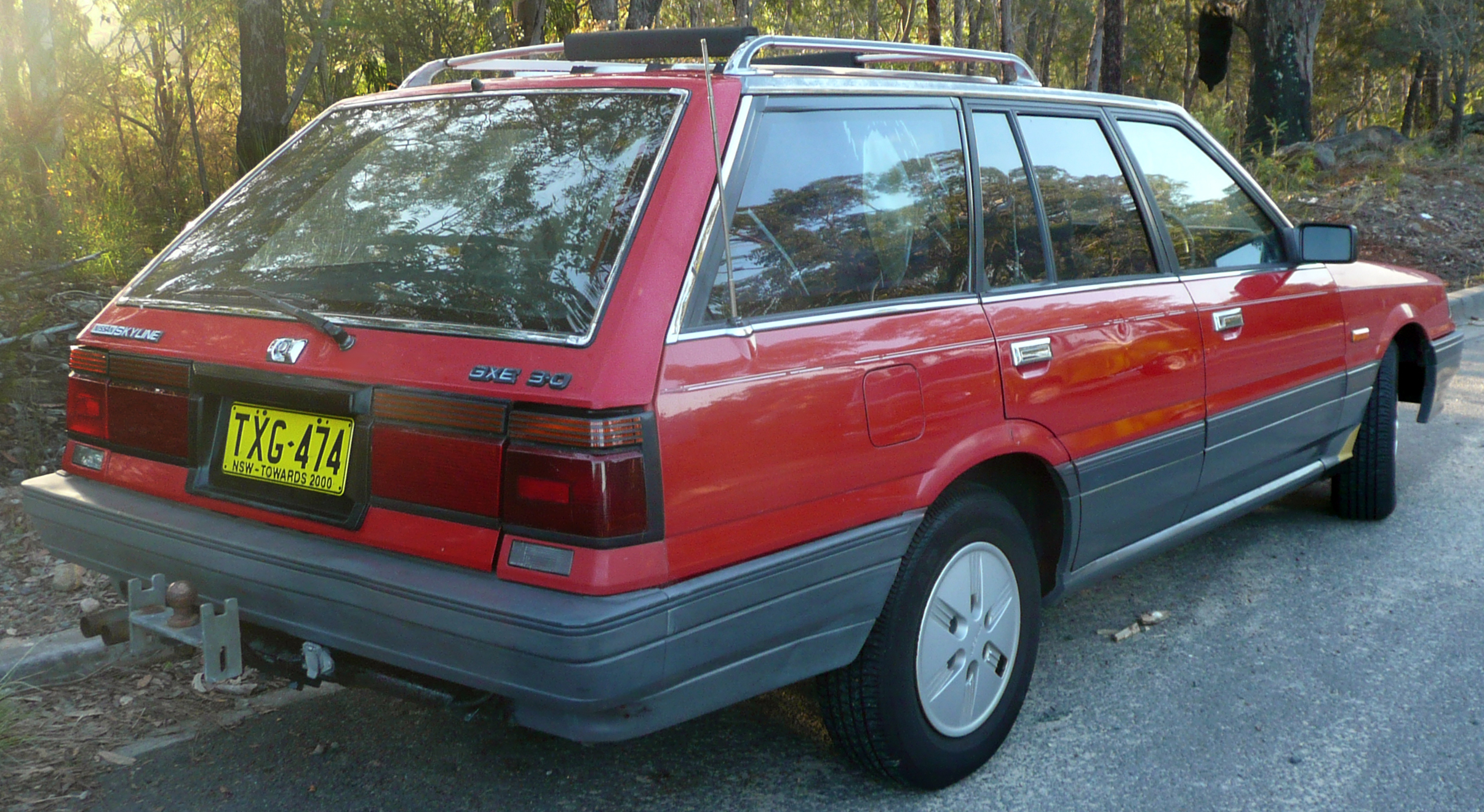
1987 Nissan Skyline GXE station wagon (facelift)

=== Exports and foreign assembly ===
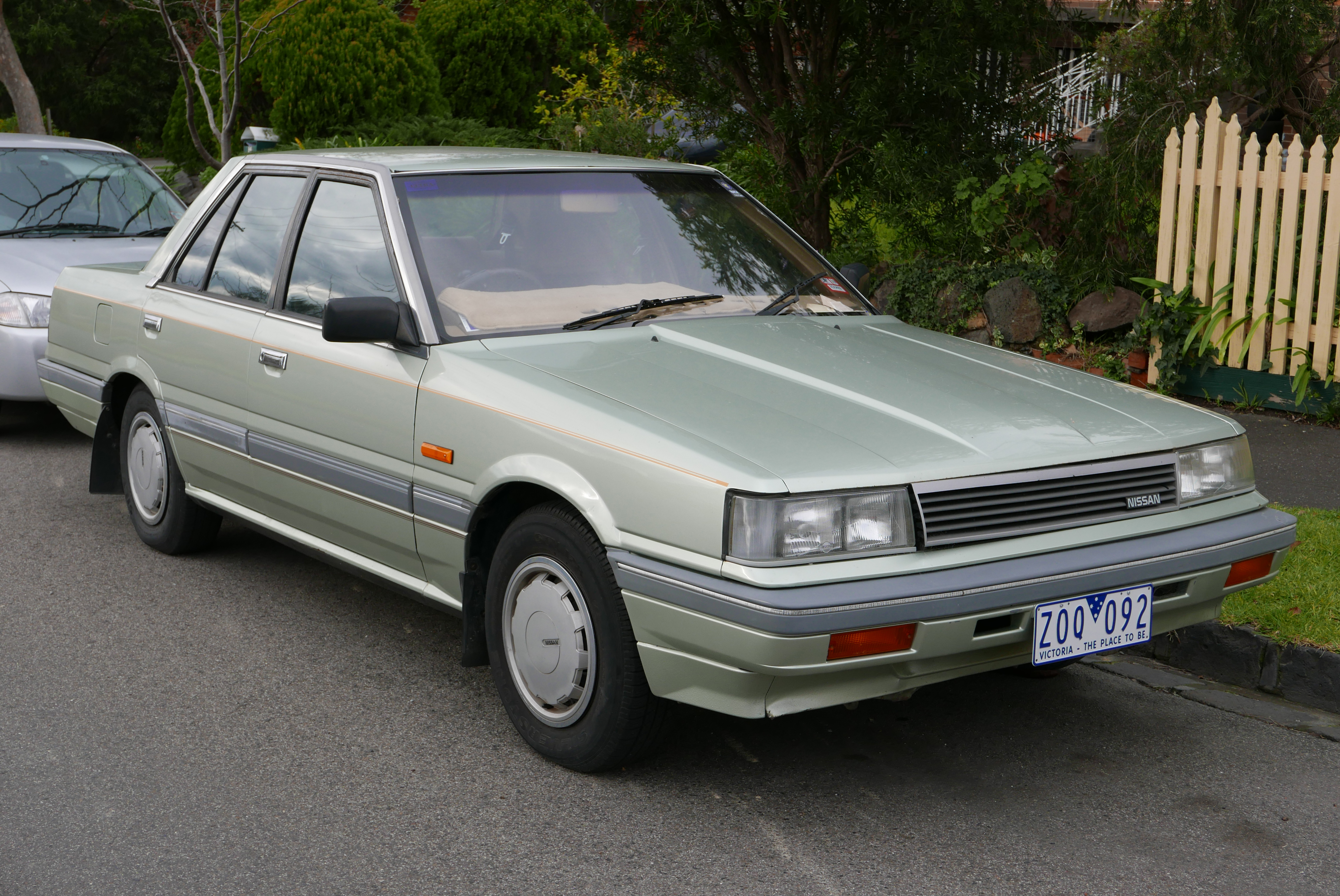
1986 Nissan Pintara GXE sedan (Australia)

The R31 Skyline was also produced in Australia, with a 3.0 L motor (RB30E) available in sedan or wagon form, as well as a four-cylinder version called the Pintara. The wagon had the same front style as the coupé and sedan—the only difference being that it lacked the four round brake lights that had been a consistent element of Skyline design (except for the R31 series one/two which had rectangular taillights with a solid bar through the centre which was also shared by the Pintara). These cars were manufactured in Australia due to the heavy import laws which made it expensive to bring cars into Australia. The engines were also modified to meet Australia's ADR27A emissions standards, leading to lower power outputs than the domestic Japanese models. Australian Skylines built for export to New Zealand were fitted with Japanese-made engines without the emissions controls seen in Australia. The Skyline was manufactured in Australia until the end of 1990, when it was replaced on the production lines by the smaller Pulsar.

Approximately 29,305 R31 Skylines were also manufactured and sold in South Africa in four-door sedan form between 1987 and 1992. These were the last Skylines seen in South Africa. Power came from either the RB30E 3.0 straight-six engine, RB20E 2.0 straight-six, or the CA20S four-cylinder powerplant.

The R31 Skyline were also sold in some Middle Eastern countries such as Kuwait and Oman. Sold in sedan or coupé form, it was available with either a carburetted or fuel injected versions of the RB30 3.0-liter straight-six. This was the final generation of the Skyline to be sold officially in the region until it was reintroduced later with the 11th generation under the Infiniti brand.

=== GTS-R ===
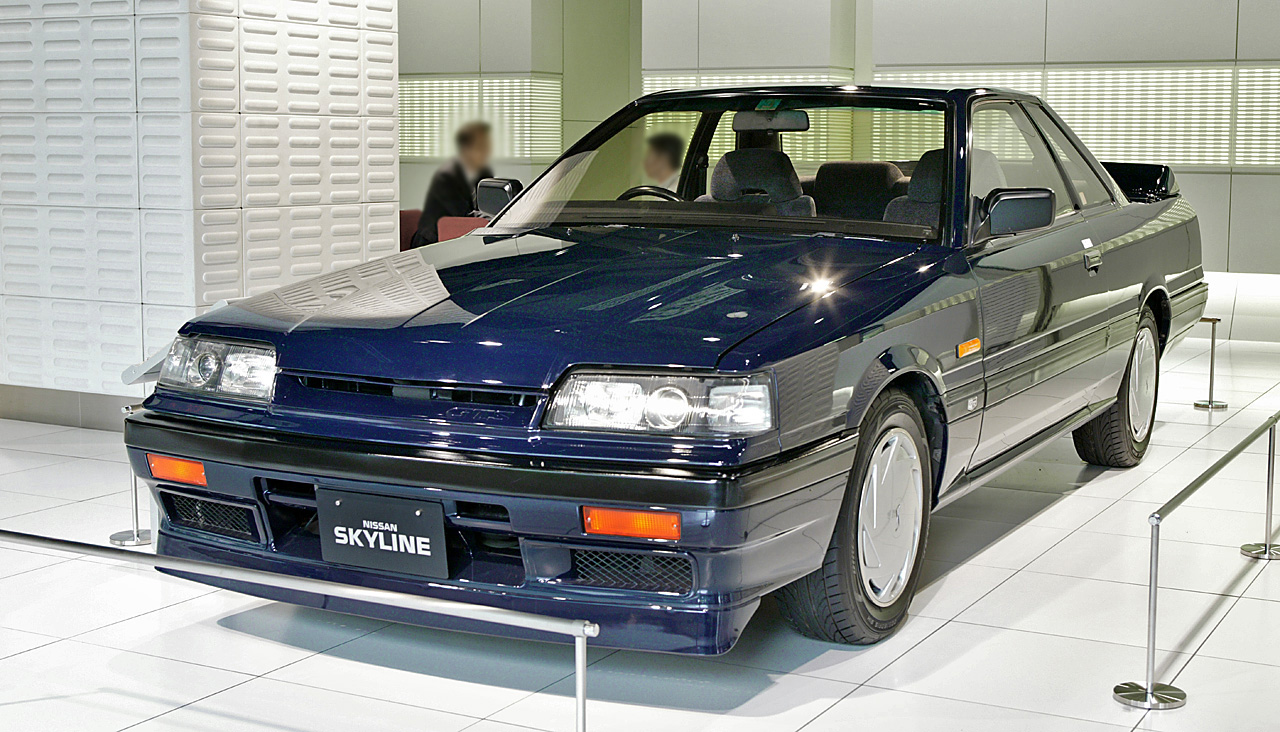

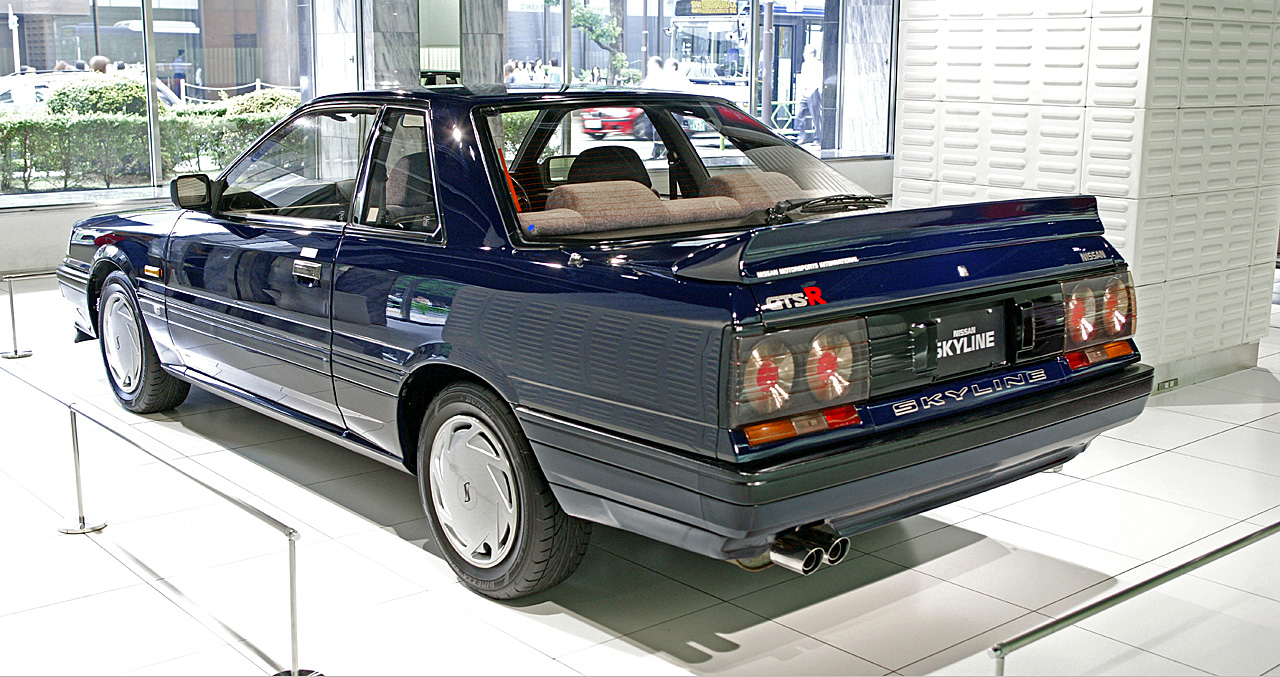
R31 Nissan Skyline Coupé 2000 GTS-R

The ultimate version of the R31 was the RB20DET-R powered HR31 GTS-R Coupé of which 823 units were built to allow an homologation "evolution" mode for Group A Touring Car racing. Introduced in October 1987, it had a reworked version of the normal RB20DET with a much larger turbocharger on a tubular steel exhaust manifold, as well as a much larger front-mounted intercooler. It had a factory-claimed maximum output of 210 PS (154 kW; 207 hp), with racing versions making over 430 PS (316 kW; 424 hp) in Group A trim, though this was still at least 110 PS (81 kW; 108 hp) less than the leading Group A car of the time, the Ford Sierra RS500 (which had approximately the same weight as the Nissan), and around 70 PS (51 kW; 69 hp) less than the heavier (by around 225 kg (496 lb)) V8 Holden Commodore.

Jim Richards and Mark Skaife drove a Gibson Motorsport prepared Skyline GTS-R to win the 1989 Sandown 500 in Australia. Richards also used the GTS-R in 6 of the 8 races to win the 1990 Australian Touring Car Championship (he used the R32 GT-R in the final two rounds of the series). It was the first Australian Touring Car Championship victory for a Nissan driver after George Fury placed second in 1983 and 1986 and Glenn Seton gained second position in 1987.

=== Models ===
Japanese market:

- 1800 C, 1800 Excel and 1800 Passage – 1.8 L CA18S SOHC I4, 90 PS (66 kW; 89 hp)
- GT Excel D, GT Passage D – 2.8 L Diesel RD28 SOHC I6, 91 PS (67 kW; 90 hp), 173 N⋅m (128 lb⋅ft)
- GT Excel, GT Passage – 2.0 L RB20E SOHC I6, 130 PS JIS Gross (96 kW; 128 hp), 181 N⋅m JIS Gross (134 lb⋅ft)

130 PS JIS Net (96 kW; 128 hp), 167 N⋅m JIS Net (123 lb⋅ft)

- GT Excel Twin Cam 24V, GT Passage Twin Cam 24V – 2.0 L RB20DE DOHC I6, 155 PS (114 kW; 153 hp)
- GT Passage Turbo – 2.0 L RB20ET SOHC turbo I6, 167 PS (123 kW; 165 hp), 206 N⋅m (152 lb⋅ft)
- GT Passage Twin Cam 24V Turbo – 2.0 L RB20DET DOHC turbo I6, 180 PS (132 kW; 178 hp), 225 N⋅m (166 lb⋅ft)
- GTS – 2.0 L RB20DE DOHC I6, 155 PS (114 kW; 153 hp)
- GTS Turbo – 2.0 L RB20DET DOHC turbo I6, 180 PS (132 kW; 178 hp), 225 N⋅m (166 lb⋅ft)
- GTS-X – 2.0 L RB20DET DOHC turbo I6, 190 PS (140 kW; 187 hp), 240 N⋅m (177 lb⋅ft)
- GTS-R – 2.0 L RB20DET-R DOHC turbo I6, 210 PS (154 kW; 207 hp), 245 N⋅m (181 lb⋅ft)
- GTS Autech – 2.0 L RB20DET-R DOHC turbo I6, 210 PS (154 kW; 207 hp), 245 N⋅m (181 lb⋅ft)
- Tommykaira M20 – 2.0 L RB20DET DOHC turbo I6, 220 PS (162 kW; 217 hp), 255 N⋅m (188 lb⋅ft)
- Tommykaira M30 – 3.0 L RB30DE DOHC I6, 240 PS (177 kW; 237 hp), 294 N⋅m (217 lb⋅ft)

Australian market:

- Pintara GLi, Executive, GX, & GXE – 2.0 L CA20E I4, 106 PS (78 kW; 105 hp), 160 N⋅m (118 lb⋅ft)
- GX, Executive, GXE, Silhouette, Ti – 3.0 L RB30E SOHC I6, 155 PS (114 kW; 153 hp), 247 N⋅m (182 lb⋅ft) Initially quoted as 117 kW, 252 N⋅m but later revised
- Silhouette GTS1 – 3.0 L RB30E SOHC I6, 177 PS (130 kW; 175 hp) , 255 N⋅m (188 lb⋅ft)
- Silhouette GTS2 – 3.0 L RB30E SOHC I6, 190 PS (140 kW; 187 hp), 270 N⋅m (199 lb⋅ft)

South African market:

- 2.0GL, 2.0GLE – 2.0 L CA20S I4, 106 hp (79 kW; 107 PS), 163 N⋅m (120 lb⋅ft)
- 2.0SGLi – 2.0 L RB20E SOHC I6, 115 hp (86 kW; 117 PS), 174 N⋅m (128 lb⋅ft)
- 3.0SGLi – 3.0 L RB30E SOHC I6, 171 hp (128 kW; 173 PS), 260 N⋅m (192 lb⋅ft)

== Eighth generation (R32; 1989) ==
Eighth generation
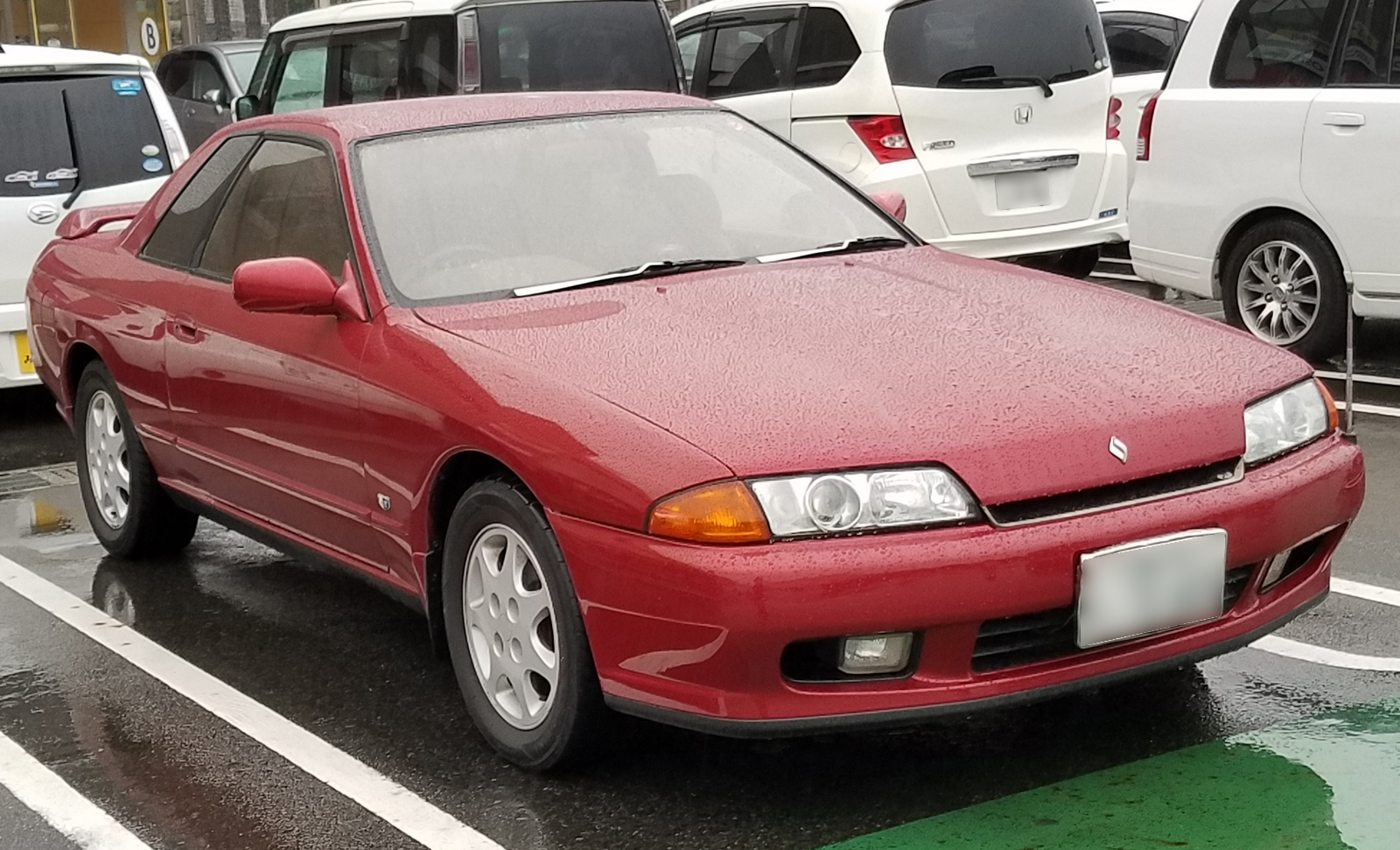
- Nissan Skyline GTS Type-S Coupe (HCR32, facelift)

Overview
- Model code: R32
- Production: May 1989 – July 1993 (standard); August 1989 – November 1994 (GT-R)
- Assembly: Japan: Musashimurayama
- Designer: Naganori Ito (1986)

Body and chassis
- Body style: 4-door sedan; 2-door coupe
- Layout: Front-engine, rear-wheel-drive; Front-engine, four-wheel-drive
- Related: Nissan Laurel (C33); Nissan Cefiro (A31)

Powertrain
- Engine: Gasoline: 1.8 L CA18i I4; 2.0 L RB20E I6; 2.0 L RB20DE DOHC I6; 2.0 L RB20DET DOHC turbo I6; 2.5 L RB25DE DOHC I6; 2.6 L RB26DETT DOHC twin-turbo I6
- Transmission: 4-speed automatic; 5-speed automatic; 5-speed manual

Dimensions
- Wheelbase: 2,615 mm (103.0 in)
- Length: 4,530 mm (178.3 in) (coupe); 4,545 mm (178.9 in) (GT-R); 4,580 mm (180.3 in) (sedan)
- Width: 1,695 mm (66.7 in); 1,755 mm (69.1 in) (GT-R)
- Height: 1,325–1,345 mm (52.2–53.0 in) (coupe); 1,340–1,355 mm (52.8–53.3 in) (GT-R); 1,340–1,360 mm (52.8–53.5 in) (sedan)
- Curb weight: 1,120–1,380 kg (2,469.2–3,042.4 lb) (RWD); 1,390–1,480 kg (3,064.4–3,262.8 lb) (AWD); 1,430–1,500 kg (3,152.6–3,306.9 lb) (GT-R)

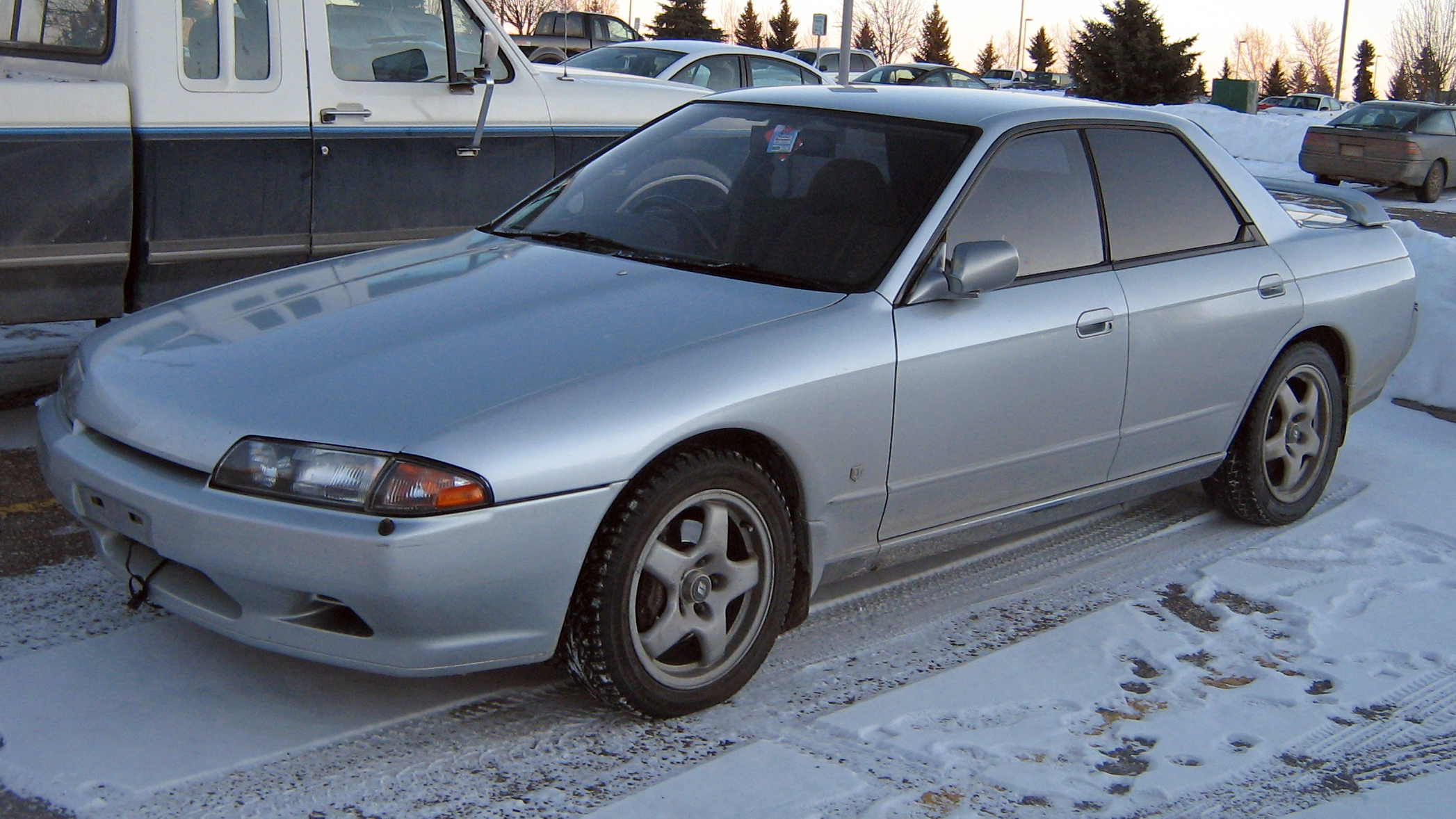
Nissan Skyline GTS-t four-door sedan (pre-facelift)

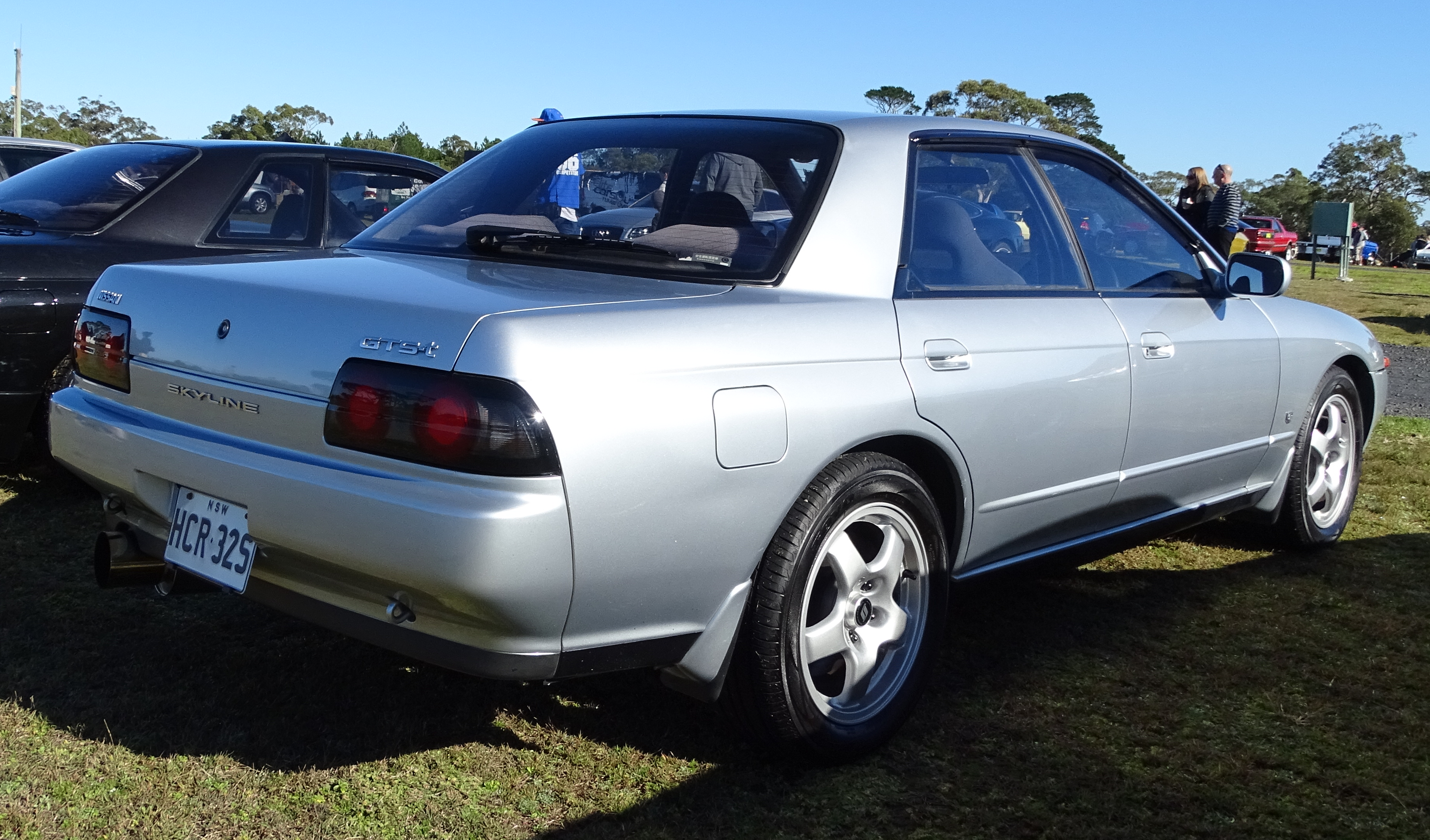
R32 Nissan Skyline GTS-t sedan (Rear view)

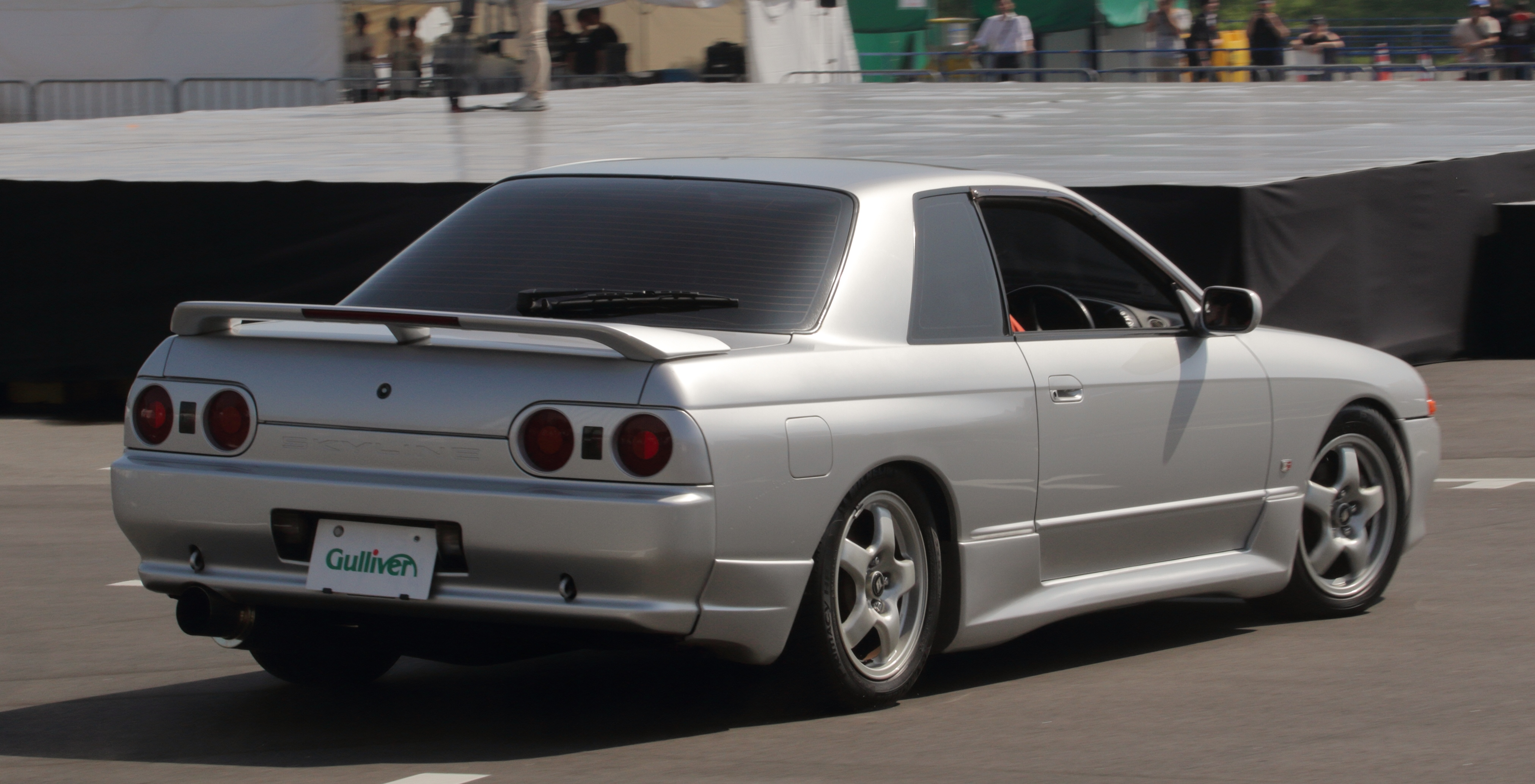
E-HCR32 Nissan Skyline GTS-t coupe (rear view)

Benefiting from Project 901, the R32 Skyline debuted in 1989. It was available as either a 2-door coupe or 4-door hardtop sedan, all other bodystyles were dropped. The R32 featured several versions of the RB-series straight-6 engines, which had improved heads (the twelve port inlet was gone) and used the ECCS (Electronically Concentrated Control System) injection system. Also available was an 1,800 cc 4-cylinder GXi model. Most models had HICAS four-wheel steering, with the rear wheels being hydraulically linked to the front steering. The 2.5-liter GTS-25 became one of the first Japanese production cars to feature a 5-speed automatic transmission. The GTS-t came in standard and Type M configurations, with the Type M having larger five-stud 16-inch wheels, four piston front calipers and twin piston rears plus other minor differences. ABS was optional (except for the GT-R and GTS-4), mechanical LSD was standard on the GT-R and viscous LSD was standard on all turbo models and optional on all but the GXi. Nissan also produced 100 Australian models of the R32. In addition, there was a 4WD version of the GTS-t Type M, called the GTS-4.

This generation was considered a "compact" under Japanese legislation that determined the amount of tax liability based on exterior dimensions. The smaller engines were offered so as to provide Japanese buyers the ability to choose which annual road tax obligation they were willing to pay. The station wagon body style was discontinued, and would not see a replacement (the Stagea) until 1996, by which point the R33 had arrived.

Models:

- GXi, GXi Type-X (FR32) sedan – 1.8 L CA18i SOHC I4, 91 PS (67 kW; 90 hp), 142 N⋅m (105 lb⋅ft) RWD
- GTE, GTE Type-X/X.V, SV/V (HR32) sedan – 2.0 L RB20E SOHC I6, 125 PS (92 kW; 123 hp), 152 N⋅m (112 lb⋅ft) RWD
- GTS, GTS SV/V, Type-J/X, Urban Road (HR32) coupe/sedan – 2.0 L RB20DE DOHC I6 155 PS (114 kW; 153 hp), 154 N⋅m (114 lb⋅ft) RWD
- GTS (HCR32) coupe/sedan – 2.0 L RB20DE DOHC I6, 155 PS (114 kW; 153 hp), 154 N⋅m (114 lb⋅ft) RWD with Super HICAS
- GTS-t, GTS-t Type-M/S (HCR32) coupe/sedan – 2.0 L RB20DET DOHC turbo I6, 215 PS (158 kW; 212 hp), 265 N⋅m (195 lb⋅ft) RWD with Super HICAS
- GTS-4 (HNR32) coupe/sedan – 2.0 L RB20DET DOHC turbo I6, 215 PS (158 kW; 212 hp), 265 N⋅m (195 lb⋅ft) 4WD with Super HICAS
- GTS-25 SV, Type-X (ER32) coupe/sedan – 2.5 L RB25DE DOHC I6, 180 PS (132 kW; 178 hp), 231 N⋅m (170 lb⋅ft) RWD
- GTS-25 Type-S/XG (ECR32) coupe/sedan – 2.5 L RB25DE DOHC I6, 180 PS (132 kW; 178 hp), 231 N⋅m (170 lb⋅ft) RWD with Super HICAS
- Autech Version GTS-4 (HNR32) sedan – 2.6 L RB26DE DOHC I6, 220 PS (162 kW; 217 hp), Autech Version (auto only) 4WD with Super HICAS - only 201 made
- GT-R (BNR32) coupe – 2.6 L RB26DETT DOHC twin-turbo I6, 280 PS (206 kW; 276 hp), 368 N⋅m (271 lb⋅ft) 4WD with Super HICAS

Type-Nismo/N1/V-Spec I/V-Spec I N1/V-Spec II/V-Spec II N1 (Race engine for Nismo (normal output) and N1, no info from Nissan (but no 24U stamp like the later once but most likely the same)

- Tommykaira M20 (based from GTS-t coupe) – tuned 2.0 L RB20DET DOHC turbo I6, 250 PS (184 kW; 247 hp), 275 N⋅m (203 lb⋅ft) RWD
- Tommykaira M30 (based from GTS-t coupe) – tuned 3.0 L (3030 cc) RB30DE DOHC I6, 280 PS (206 kW; 276 hp), 296 N⋅m (218 lb⋅ft) RWD
- Tommykaira R (based from GT-R) – tuned 2.6 L RB26DETT DOHC twin-turbo I6, 350 PS (257 kW; 345 hp), 354 N⋅m (261 lb⋅ft) 4WD with Super HICAS
- HKS EN2-A (based from GTS-t coupe) – tuned 2.0 L RB20DET DOHC turbo I6, 350 PS (257 kW; 345 hp) 2WD with Super HICAS
- HKS Zero-R (based from GT-R) – tuned 2.7 L (2688 cc) RB26DETT DOHC twin-turbo I6, 450 PS (331 kW; 444 hp), 490 N⋅m (361 lb⋅ft) 4WD with Super HICAS
- HKS Zero-R 2006 spec (based from GT-R) – tuned 2.8 L (2771 cc) RB26DETT DOHC twin-turbo I6, 600 PS (441 kW; 592 hp), 647 N⋅m (477 lb⋅ft) 4WD with Super HICAS

Production numbers:

- Standard - 269,554
- GT-R - 43,937
- Total - 313,491

=== GT-R (BNR32) ===
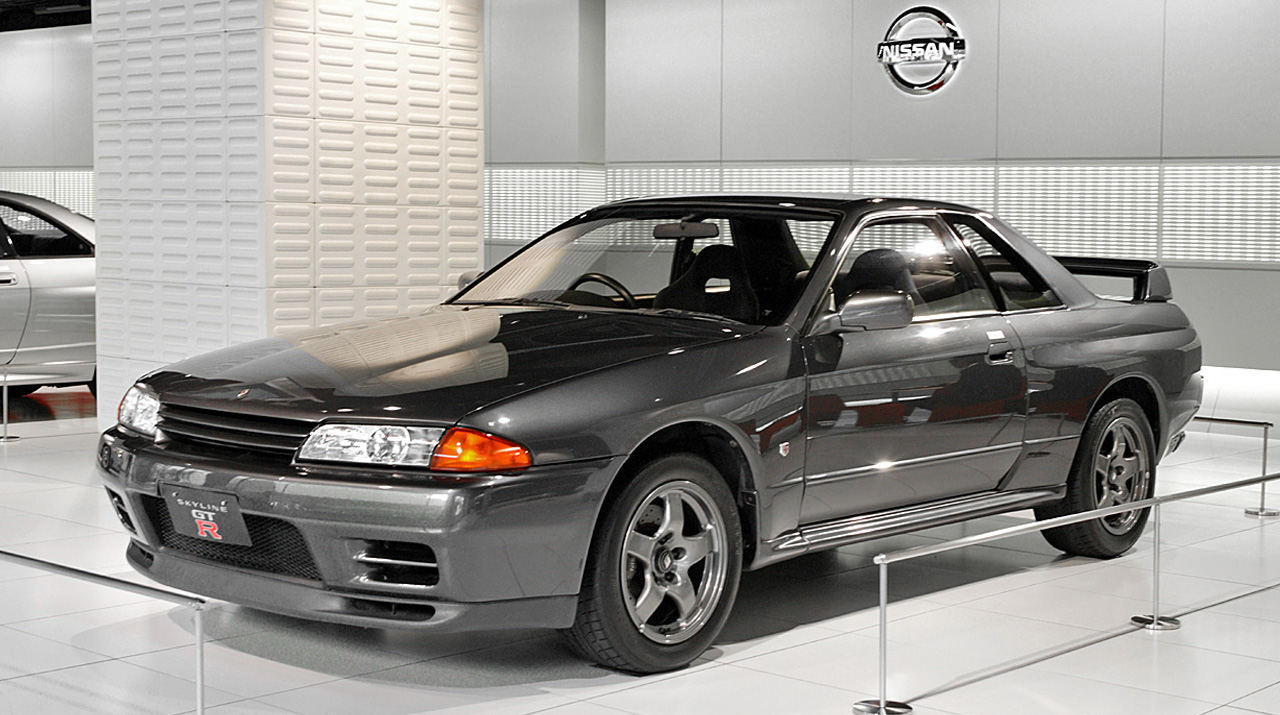
R32 Nissan Skyline GT-R

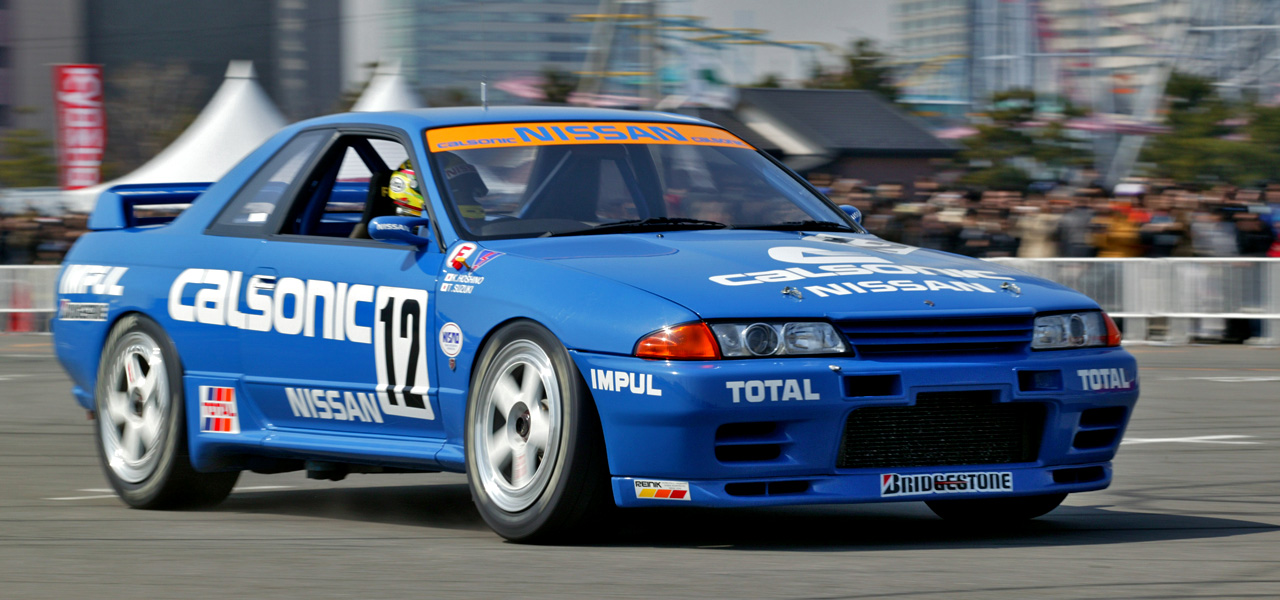
The CALSONIC R32 GT-R from the Group A series

The R32 GT-R was first produced in 1988 including prototype cars. The first six Nismos were built in 1989. The other 554 NISMO GT-Rs were all built in 1990 and were all Gunmetal Grey in color. The RB26DETT engine actually produced ≈320 PS (316 hp), but it was understated due to the Japanese car makers' "gentlemen's agreement" not to exceed 280 PS (276 hp). The engine was designed for ≈500 hp in racing trim, and then muzzled by the exhaust, boost restriction, and ECU. After this increase the car would put out ≈310 hp (≈230 kW) and could do 0–100 km/h (62 mph) in 4.7 seconds and the quarter mile in 12.8 seconds.

The GT-R had a significantly larger intercooler, larger brakes, and aluminum front guards and hood. Other distinguishing features include flared front and rear wheel arches. More supportive seats were fitted, and the turbo boost gauge and digital clock were removed from inside the instrument cluster. The clock was replaced with a torque meter that indicated how much torque was being delivered to the front wheels (0%–50%). Oil temp, voltage, and turbo boost gauges were fitted just above the climate control.

The Porsche 959 was Nissan's target when designing the GT-R. The chief engineer, Naganori Ito, intended to use the car for Group A racing, so the design specification was drawn up in conjunction with a copy of the Group A rules. The Nordschleife production car record at the time of development was 8'45" – set by a Porsche 944. Nissan test driver Hiroyoshi Katoh reset the record with a time of 8'20". Best Motoring managed 8'22"38.

The R32 GT-R dominated Japanese Touring Car Championship (JTCC), winning 29 races from 29 starts, taking the series title every year from 1989 to 1993. It took 50 races from 50 starts from 1991 to 1997 (latterly R33) in the N1 Super Taikyu.

The R32 GT-R was introduced into the Australian Touring Car Championship in 1990 and promptly ended the reign of the previously all-conquering Ford Sierra Cosworth, winning Bathurst 1000 classic in 1991 and 1992. This success led to the Australian motoring press nicknaming the car Godzilla due to it being a "monster from Japan". As Australia was the first export market for the car the name quickly spread. Such was the GT-R's dominance that it was a significant factor in the demise of Group A Touring Car racing, the formula being scrapped soon after. JTCC was similarly blighted by the R32 GT-R, and splintered soon after, leading to the switch to the Supertouring category and also indirectly to the GT500 category of today.

When originally designed, the homologation rulebook mandated 16-inch wheels, so that's what the GT-R got. This limited the size of the brakes, and the four-piston calipers used by Nissan were not competitive. After the rules changed to allow 17-inch wheels, the GT-R V-spec (for Victory) emerged in February 1993 wearing 17" BBS mesh wheels (225/50/17) covering larger Brembo calipers. The clutch actuation changed from a push to a pull system and the car had a standard mechanical rear differential (the electronic rear differential did not show up until the R33 V-Spec). A year later, the V-Spec II appeared with a new sticker and wider tires (245/45 17).

The Nismo Skyline GT-R is a limited (500 street, 60 racing) version of Nissan Skyline with Nissan RB engine with twin steel turbochargers rated 280 PS (206 kW; 276 hp) at 6,800 rpm and 353 N⋅m (260 lb⋅ft) at 4,400 rpm, HICAS all-wheel steering, electronically controlled ATTESA all-wheel drive.

In August 2014, the first R32 Skyline GT-Rs became eligible for US import under the NHTSA "25 year" rule, which allows vehicles that are at least 25 years old (to the month of manufacture) to be imported. These vehicles, due to their age do not have to comply with federal emissions or with federal motor vehicle safety standards.

== Ninth generation (R33; 1993) ==
Ninth generation
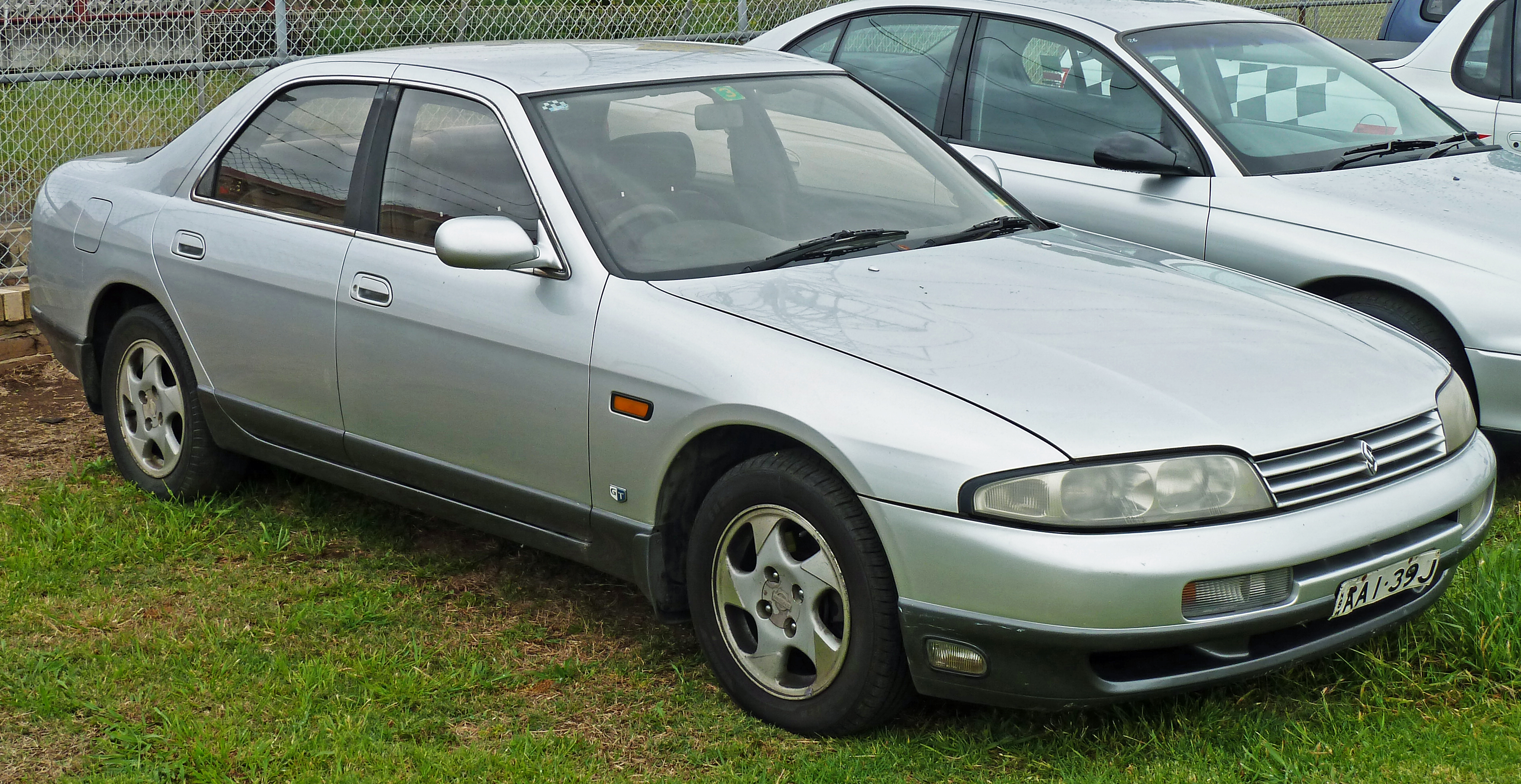
- 1993–1996 Nissan Skyline R33 GTS Sedan

Overview
- Model code: R33
- Production: August 1993 – April 1998 (November 1998 for GT-R); 217,133 units sold
- Assembly: Japan: Musashimurayama
- Designer: Kozo Watanabe (1991)

Body and chassis
- Body style: 4-door sedan; 2-door coupé
- Layout: Front-engine, rear-wheel-drive; Front-engine, four-wheel-drive
- Related: Nissan Laurel (C34); Nissan Stagea

Powertrain
- Engine: Gasoline: 2.0 L RB20E SOHC I6 (GTS); 2.5 L RB25DE I6 (GTS-25, GTS-4); 2.5 L RB25DET turbo I6 (GTS-25t); 2.6 L RB26DETT twin-turbo I6 (GT-R); 2.8 L RBX-GT2 twin-turbo I6 (400R)
- Transmission: 5-speed manual; 5-speed automatic RE5R01A; 4-speed automatic RE4R01A

Dimensions
- Wheelbase: 2,720 mm (107.1 in)
- Length: 4,640 mm (182.7 in) (coupé); 4,675 mm (184.1 in) (GT-R); 4,720 mm (185.8 in) (sedan)
- Width: 1,720 mm (67.7 in); 1,780 mm (70.1 in) (GT-R)
- Height: 1,340–1,360 mm (52.8–53.5 in) (coupé); 1,360–1,375 mm (53.5–54.1 in) (sedan)
- Curb weight: 1,270–1,410 kg (2,799.9–3,108.5 lb) (RWD); 1,430–1,470 kg (3,152.6–3,240.8 lb) (AWD); 1,530–1,540 kg (3,373.1–3,395.1 lb) (GT-R)

The R33 Skyline was introduced in August 1993. Slightly heavier than the R32, it was again available in coupé and sedan body configurations. The R33 was the safest of the models with a rating of 3.8 out of 5.5 accordingly; the airbag system and internal crash bars made this vehicle significantly safer than previous models. All models now used a six-cylinder engine. Nissan took the unusual step of down-grading the GTS model to have only the RB20E, this was mated to either a 5 speed manual or an optional 5 speed automatic. The twin-cam unit of the R32 GTS was discontinued and so was the 2.0 L turbo RB20DET from the GTS-t, this was replaced with the GTS-25t which was equipped with the larger RB25DET and mated to either a 5 speed manual or an optional 4 speed automatic, the 5 speed auto was not used as it wasn't strong enough for the extra power. HICAS was standard in all GTS-25t sub-models except the Type G.

Some models came equipped with a new version of the HICAS four-wheel steering system called Super HICAS. This computer controlled system was first used on the R32 GT-R. Super HICAS used electric actuators to steer the rear, as opposed to the hydraulic HICAS. This generation was no longer considered a "compact" under Japanese legislation that determined the amount of tax liability based on exterior dimensions.

As an option, an active limited-slip differential was available instead of the standard viscous LSD. This new unit locked the rear differential if it detected that traction was lost by one of the wheels. A light on the dash also lit up if the LSD engaged. Active LSD came standard on all V-Spec R33 GT-R Skylines and was also available on some ECR33 GTS-25t models; these can be identified by the A-LSD and SLIP lights on the tachometer.

The RB25DE and RB25DET engines also became equipped with NVCS (variable inlet cam phasing). NVCS equipped RB series engine have a bulge on the front of the cam cover. To celebrate their 40th anniversary, Nissan introduced a very rare four-door GT-R. Two versions of the GT-R sedan were available from Nissan's subsidiaries: the first was produced by Autech, and the second was a joint Autech/Nismo project.

A Nissan Laurel C34-based wagon was released in September 1996, called the Stagea. It is widely regarded as a compatriot of the Skyline, rather than the Laurel it was based on, owing to drivetrain configurations — commonly AWD, using ATTESA ET-S. A common modification on the Stagea is to fit it with an R34 skyline front, in effect making an R34-lookalike wagon. A manual transmission was only available on the RS-Four S and 260RS models. There was also an Autech tuned Stagea, the 260RS; released with full GT-R running gear including the RB26DETT engine and manual transmission, a unique body kit, 17-inch BBS style alloys, and GT-R instrumentation.

Models:

- HR33 GTS – 2.0 L RB20E SOHC I6, 130 PS (96 kW; 128 hp), 172 N⋅m (127 lb⋅ft)
- ER33 GTS-25 – 2.5 L RB25DE DOHC I6, 190 PS (140 kW; 187 hp), 231 N⋅m (170 lb⋅ft)
- ENR33 GTS-4 – 2.5 L RB25DE DOHC I6, 190 PS (140 kW; 187 hp), 231 N⋅m (170 lb⋅ft) 4WD
- ECR33 GTS-25t – 2.5 L RB25DET DOHC turbo I6, 250 PS (184 kW; 247 hp), 294 N⋅m (217 lb⋅ft)
- ECR33 P.Ride 280 Type MR – 2.8L RB28DET DOHC turbo I6, 300 PS (221 kW; 296 hp)
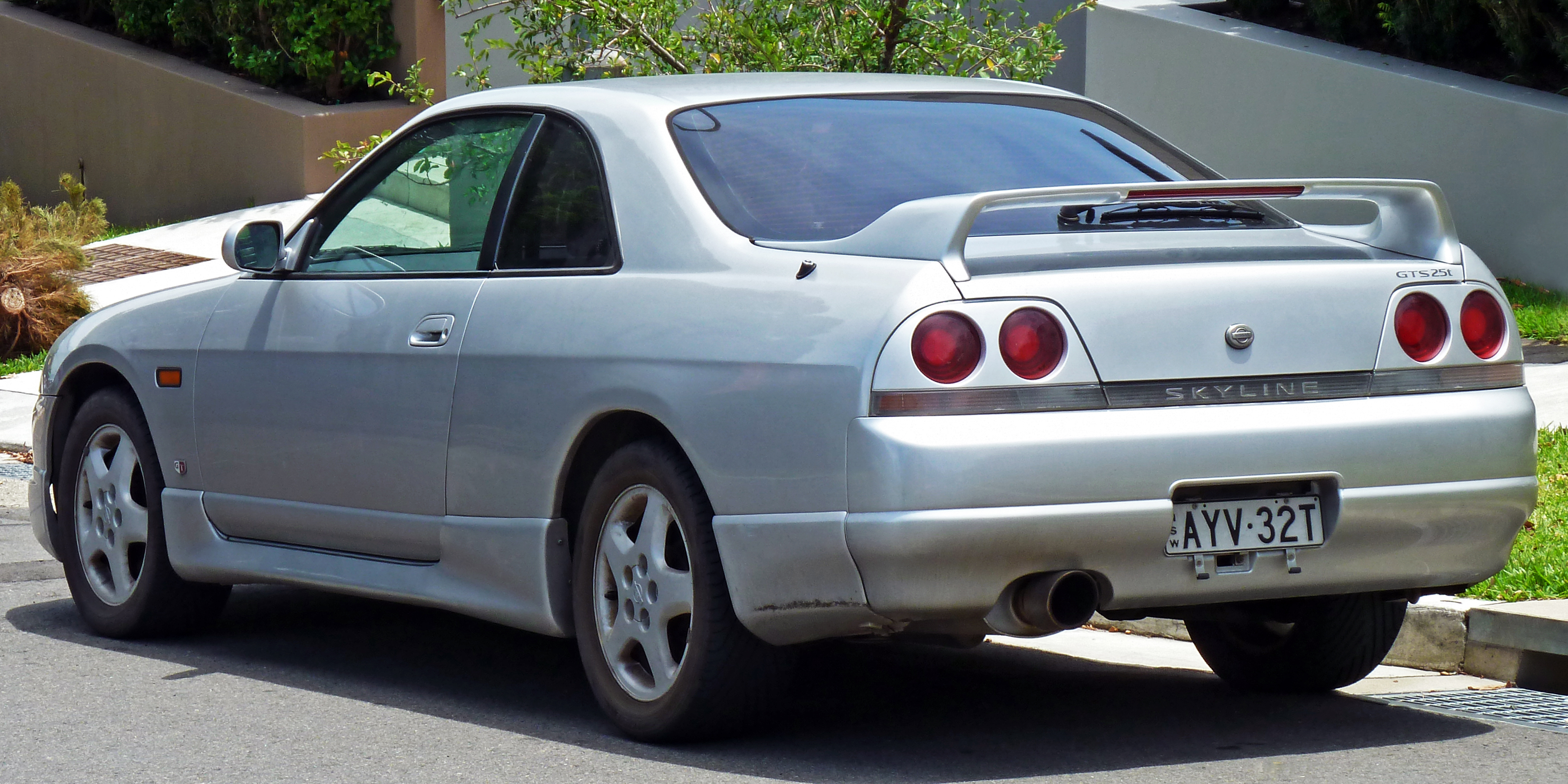
1993–1996 Nissan Skyline (R33) GTS-25t coupé

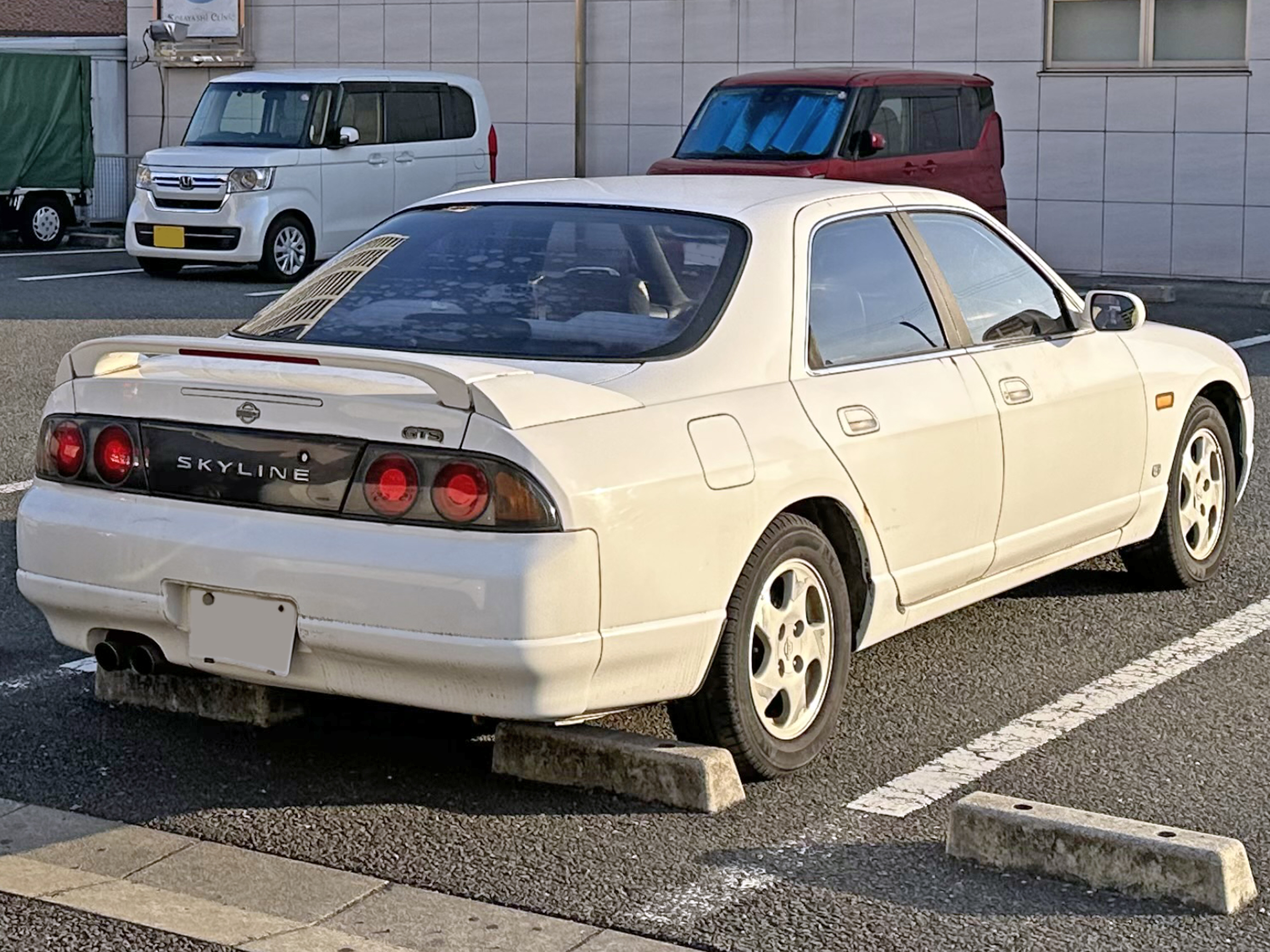
1994 Nissan Skyline GTS Sedan (E-HR33)

=== 1996 facelift ===
The R33 Skyline (Spec 2) continued the concepts introduced in the R32. Driver and Passenger airbags became standard in 1996. As a result, pre-1996 models are barred from being imported into various countries for consumer road use as they do not meet the frontal impact standards. For the RB25DET engine the ignition system was also changed, with the ignition module no longer located on the cam covers and was instead replaced by smart ignition coils (Ignitor built into coil) and ECU. The RB25DET's turbo was also given a nylon compressor wheel to improve response. Throughout the time the R33 was produced there were quite a number of different styled lights and bodykits fitted, the actual body/chassis underwent no changes. Among the cosmetic changes in the spec 2 were, the headlights which tapered down more towards the grille and were fitted with improved reflectors, the grille (which was longer on the Spec 1), the hood which had a re-shaped leading edge to fit the new lights and front bumper changing shape in the smallest amount to match the lower edge of the new headlights. Later models of the Spec 2 also had the option of having an Active-LSD fitted.

The R33 ceased production in February 1998, the production run ending with the 40th Anniversary R33.

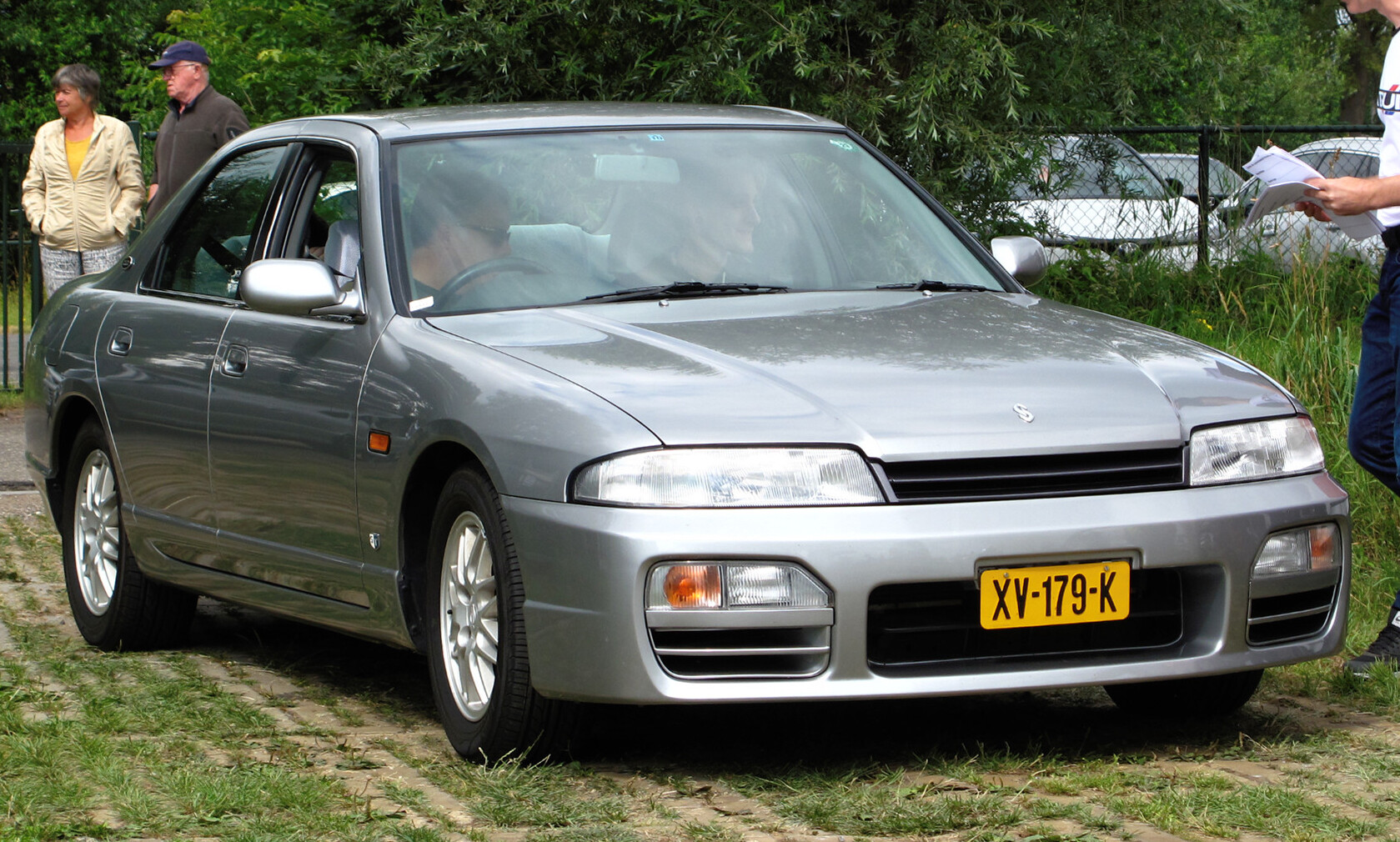
1997 Skyline GTS (facelift)

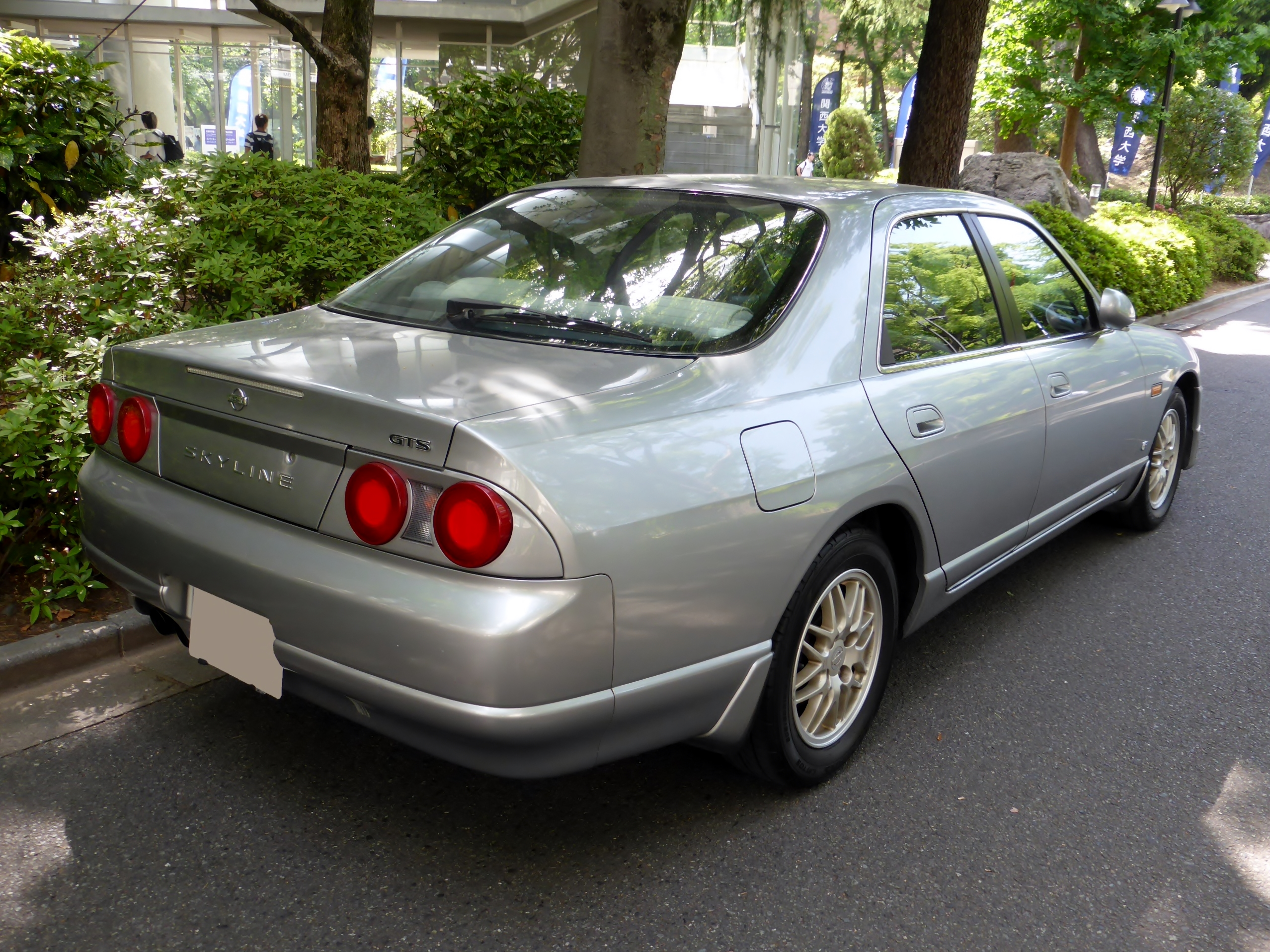
Rear view (sedan; facelift)

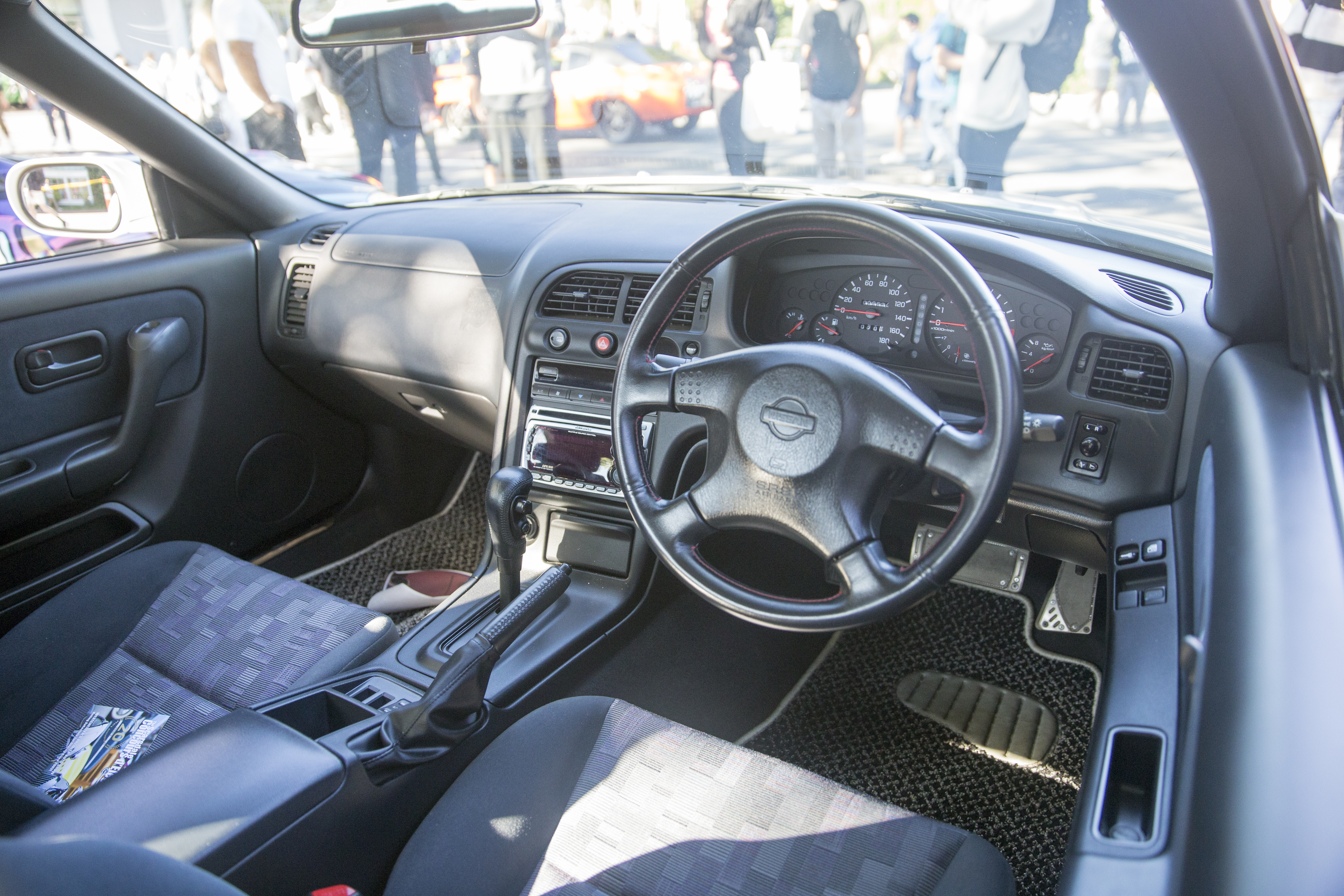
Skyline interior (GTS-25t Type M)

=== GT-R (BCNR33) ===
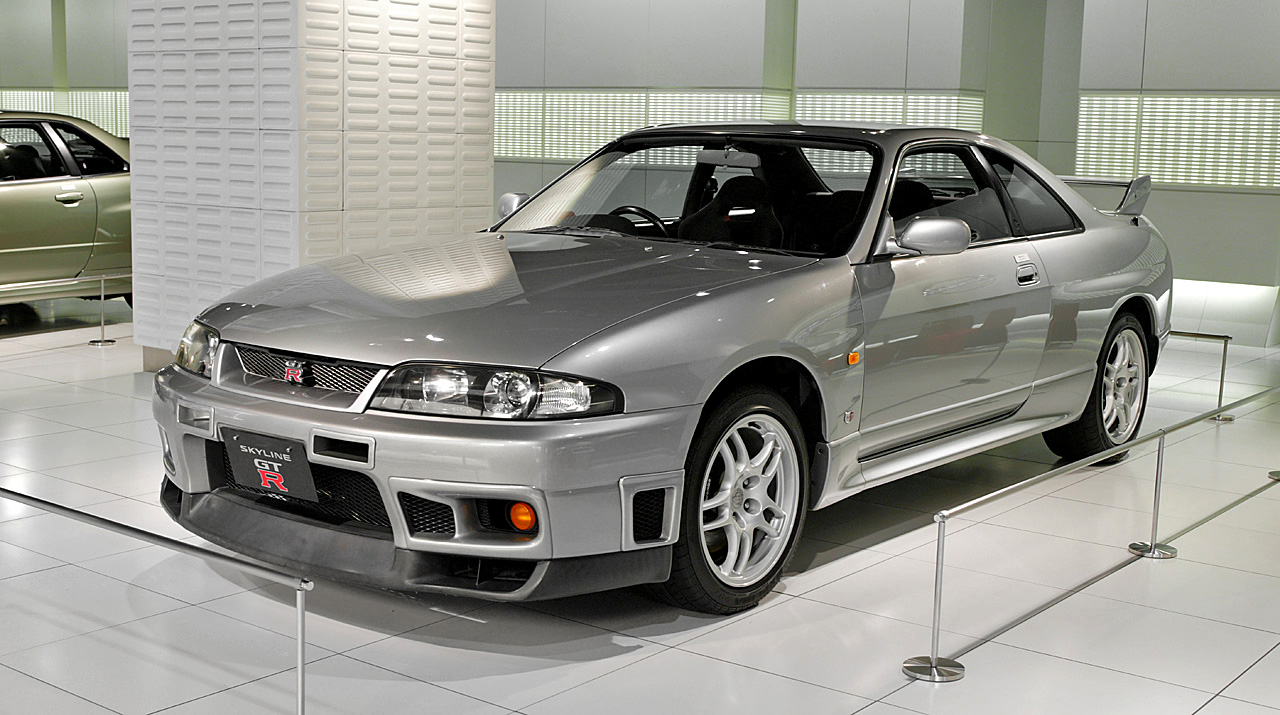
Nissan Skyline R33 GT-R

The previous R32 model was a well proven build, but the R32 wasn't without faults and suffered with uplift and balance issues. Along with that, Nissan was, as other Japanese companies were, under strict restrictions on power gains. So, to combat all those areas, Nissan created the sophisticated strength Programme. Nissan increased the width by about one inch on the R33 to the R32 and made it about 4 inches longer. This gave the R33 a longer wheelbase overall and lower stance mixed with new technology now from the computer aerodynamic age. Each line on the R33 was intended to give the car ultimate aerodynamics with wider gaps in the bumper and angles of air movement which allowed better cooling, in addition to the fuel tank lifted; the battery moved to the trunk. Rigidity points were added mixed with improvements on the Attessa and Hicas all now offered the R33 with the best aerodynamics, balance, and handling. Nissan engineers also found other ways to reduce weight, even by a few grams.

This includes: Hollowing out the side door beams. Using high tensile steel on body panels. Reduction in sound deadening materials. Super HICAS becoming electric. Hollowing out of rear stabilizer bar. Use of high tensile springs front and rear. Shrinking the ABS actuator. Light aluminum wheels with higher rigidity The front and rear axles were made of aluminum (as in the BNR32), but so were engine mount insulators and brackets. New plastics were used for: fuel tank, head lamps, super high strength "PP" bumpers, air cleaner, changing the headlining material, changing material of rear spoiler. All this put together meant we saw an improved time against the R32 of 21 seconds faster around the Nürburgring and 23 seconds faster in V spec trim, still making the R33 the fastest Skyline around the Nürburgring. The BCNR33 GT-R version also had the same RB26DETT engine that the BNR32 was equipped with, although torque had been improved, due to changes in the turbo compressor aerodynamics, turbo dump pipe, and intercooler. The turbo core changed from a sleeve bearing to a ball bearing, but the turbine itself remained ceramic, except on N1 turbos (steel turbine, sleeve bearing). From the R33 onward, all GT-Rs received Brembo brakes. In 1995 the GT-R received an improved version of the RB26DETT, the ATTESA-ETS four-wheel-drive system, and Super HICAS 4-wheel steering.

A limited-edition model was created in 1996, called the NISMO 400R, that produced 406 PS (298 kW; 400 hp) from a road-tuned version of Nissan's Le Mans engine. A stronger six-speed Getrag gearbox was used.

An R33 GT-R driven by Dirk Schoysman lapped the Nordschleife in less than 8 minutes. The Skyline GT-R R33 is reported to be the first production car to break 8 minutes, at 7 minutes and 59 seconds. Other manufacturers had caught up since the R32 was released, and the R33 never dominated motorsport to the extent of the R32. The R33 saw victory in the JGTC GT500 dominating the class and taking victory each year until its final racing year in which it was finally beaten by the McLaren F1 GTR.

The R33 saw huge favour in the tuning world with it being a popular model on the Wangan and top tuning companies building heavily tuned version from Top Secret ran by Smokey Nagata to Jun etc. and later by companies like Sumo. HKS GT-R would hold a drag series record for several years in their drag series, making a record win of 7.671-second pass at Sendai Hi-Land Raceway with Tetsuya Kawasaki behind the wheel and taking it to be the world's fastest AWD car.

Models:

- GT-R – 2.6 L RB26DETT DOHC twin-turbo I6, 280 PS (206 kW; 276 hp), 375 N⋅m (277 lb⋅ft) 4WD
- GT-R LM – 2.6 L RB26DETT DOHC twin-turbo I6, 305 PS (224 kW; 301 hp) FR
- NISMO 400R – 2.8 L RBX-GT2 DOHC twin-turbo I6, 400 PS (294 kW; 395 hp), 478 N⋅m (353 lb⋅ft) 4WD - intended to be produced in a limited run of just 100 cars, although only 44 were ever built.
- 4Dr. GT-R Autech Version – 2.6 L RB26DETT DOHC twin-turbo I6, 280 PS (206 kW; 276 hp), 375 N⋅m (277 lb⋅ft) 4WD - only 447 made

== Tenth generation (R34; 1998) ==
Tenth generation
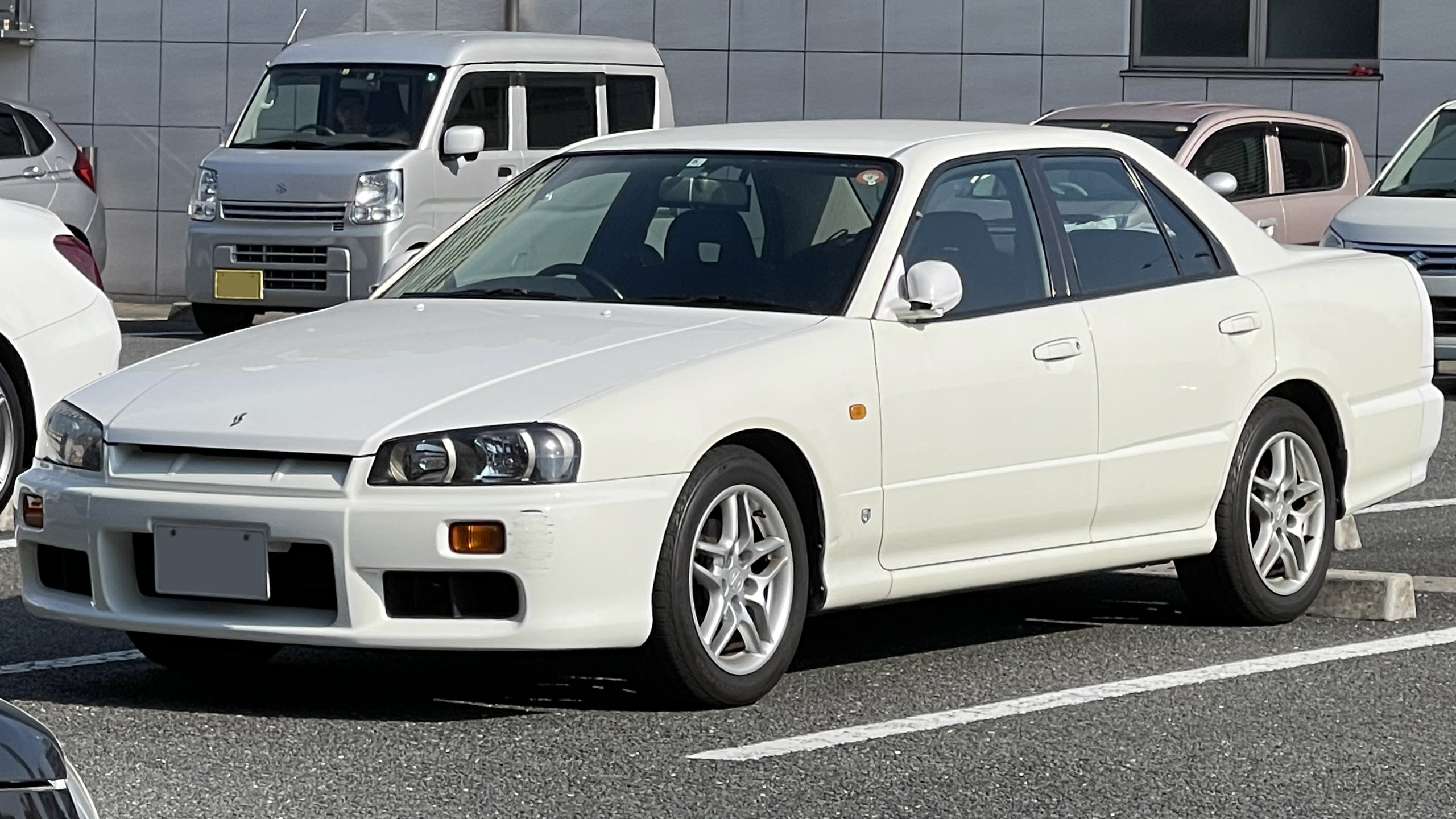
- Nissan Skyline R34 25GT Sedan

Overview
- Model code: R34
- Production: May 1998 – June 2002 (up to August 2002 for the GT-R and up to 2005 for the NISMO Z-Tune); 64,623 units sold
- Assembly: Japan: Musashimurayama
- Designer: Kozo Watanabe (1996)

Body and chassis
- Body style: 4-door sedan; 2-door coupe
- Layout: Front-engine, rear-wheel-drive (ER/HR34); Front-engine, four-wheel-drive (BNR/ENR34)
- Related: Nissan Laurel (C35); Nissan Stagea

Powertrain
- Engine: Gasoline: 2.0 L RB20DE I6; 2.5 L RB25DE I6; 2.5 L RB25DE NEO I6; 2.5 L RB25DET turbo I6; 2.6 L RB26DETT twin-turbo I6
- Transmission: 4-speed automatic (E-ATx) RE4R01A; 4-speed automatic (M-ATx) RE4R01B; 5-speed manual (5MT) FS5W71C; 5-speed manual (5MT) FS5R30A; 6-speed manual (6MT) Getrag 233 (GT-R)

Dimensions
- Wheelbase: 2,665 mm (104.9 in)
- Length: 4,580 mm (180.3 in) (coupe); 4,600 mm (181.1 in) (GT-R); 4,705 mm (185.2 in) (sedan)
- Width: 1,720 mm (67.7 in) (coupe); 1,725 mm (67.9 in) (sedan); 1,785 mm (70.3 in) (GT-R)
- Height: 1,340–1,350 mm (52.8–53.1 in) (coupe); 1,360 mm (53.5 in) (GT-R); 1,375–1,385 mm (54.1–54.5 in) (sedan)
- Curb weight: 1,330–1,460 kg (2,932.1–3,218.7 lb) (coupe); 1,360–1,490 kg (2,998.3–3,284.9 lb) (sedan); 1,540–1,580 kg (3,395.1–3,483.3 lb) (GT-R)

Chronology
- Successor: Nissan GT-R (R35) (for GT-R models)

The R34 Skyline was introduced in May 1998. The HR34, ER34, and ENR34 marked the introduction of the more fuel-efficient RB25DET NEO engine. The RB20E engine was discontinued in the R34 base model (GT), and the RB20DE, after last being used in the R32 Skyline, was reintroduced in the updated NEO guise. The HR34 GT, powered by the RB20DE NEO and coupled with a five-speed gearbox, became the most fuel-efficient straight-six Skyline (of any shape) to date. This was the last Skyline to have its platform shared with the luxury-oriented, longer wheelbase Laurel, which was due to be discontinued in 2002 after the closure of the Musashimurayama plant that year.

The 4-speed automatic transmission available on some models was retained, and was upgraded with tiptronic-style manual controls. An export-market 25GT Turbo coupe variant (often abbreviated as GT-T) was sold in Singapore and Hong Kong from 1998 to 2000, while the facelift 25GT Turbo was sold in New Zealand between 2001 and 2002 alongside the GT-R V-Spec. These were the only three countries outside of Japan that sold the R34 25GT Turbo model Skylines new. All Japanese Nissan Prince Store locations that sold the Skyline were renamed Nissan Red Stage.

In February 1999, Nissan introduced two new models for the base vehicle, the 25GT-X and the 25GT-V. The 25GT-X was only available as a sedan and included optional extras over the base-model 25GT and 25GT Turbo such as tinted rear windows and pop-up liquid-crystal display that replaced the triple cluster on the turbo models. Another version, the 25GT-V, was a naturally aspirated variation powered by the RB25DE, came standard with the upgraded 4-piston front and 2-piston rear Sumitomo calipers, limited-slip differential and 17" alloy wheels only found on the turbo models.

In August 2000, the R34 received a facelift which changed the front bumper to a new, sleek design and Xenon headlights were standard across the entire range along with side-airbags built into the driver and passenger outer seat bolsters. For the interior, pedals were changed from rubber to aluminum while the gear shift knob and steering wheel were now made of genuine leather in a 2-tone design, the latter branded with the Skyline "S" badge as opposed to the Nissan logo. The centre console and dials now had an iridium-silver appearance; previously they were a gunmetal-grey look. Optional exterior extras for the R34 included exterior aero which consists of redesigned front and rear bumpers, side skirts and a wrap-around spoiler on the rear which was only available for the coupe. Optional tuning Nismo parts for the R34 included shock absorbers, a variable sports exhaust system, aluminum intercooler, sway bars, oil cooler, and limited-slip differential.

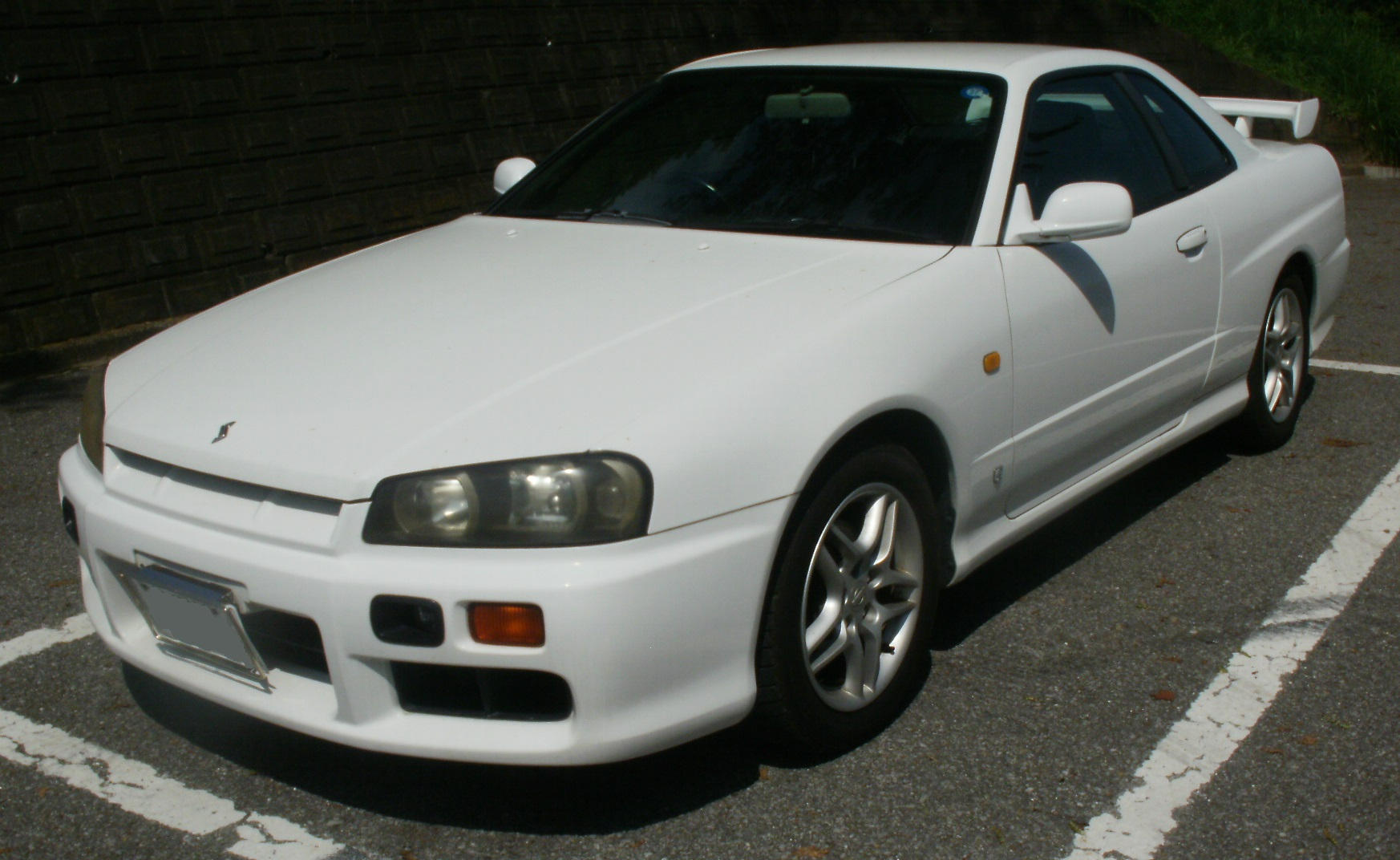
Nissan Skyline 25GT Coupe

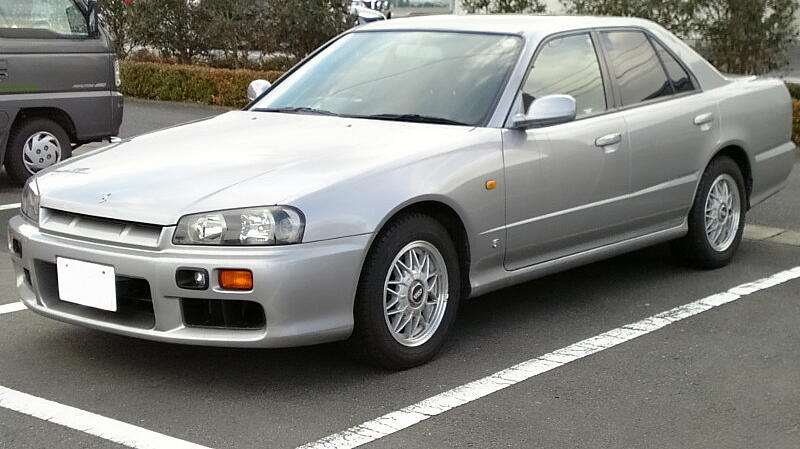
1998 Nissan Skyline sedan (Japan)

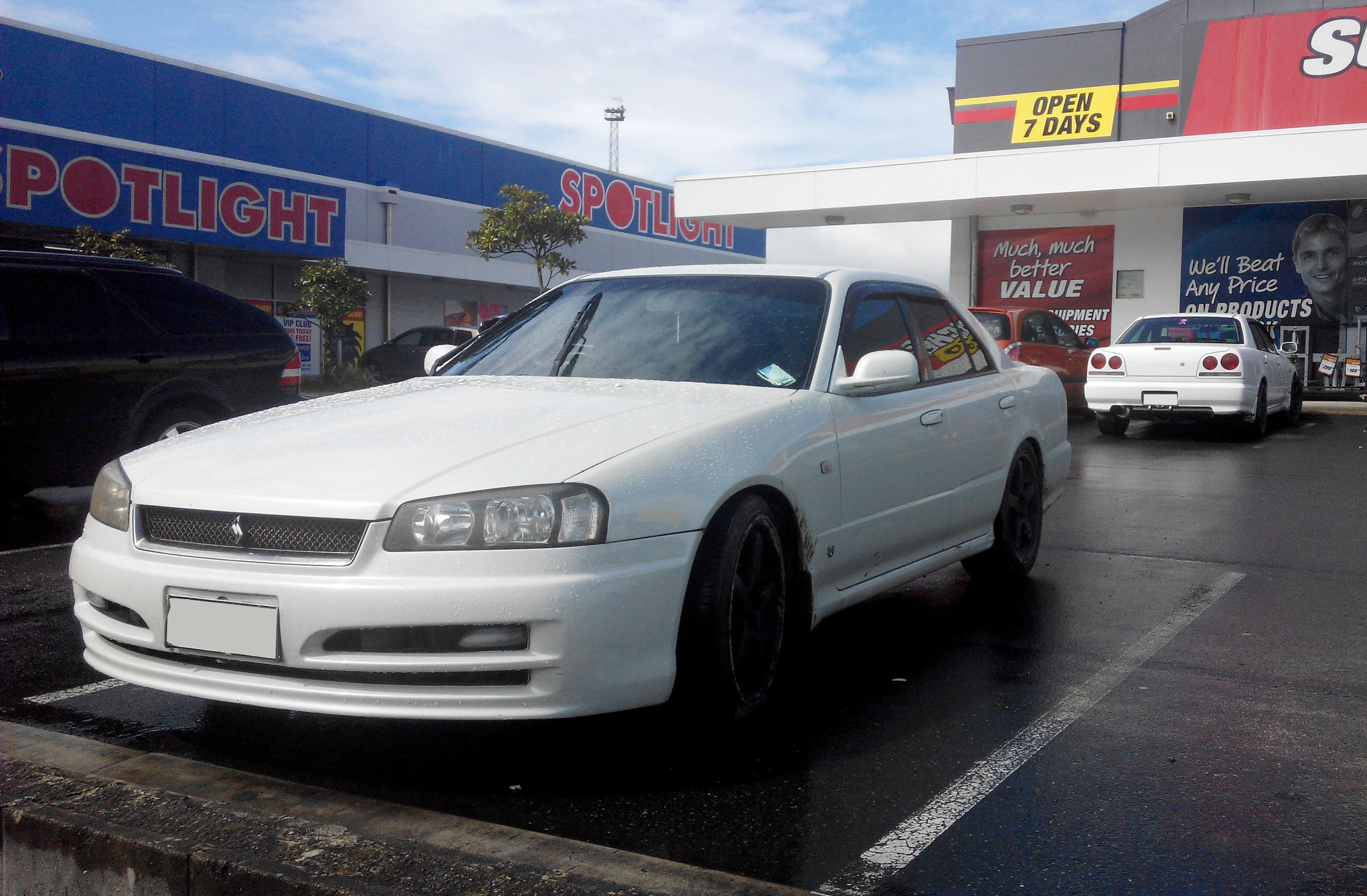
2001 Nissan Skyline GT facelift sedan (New Zealand)

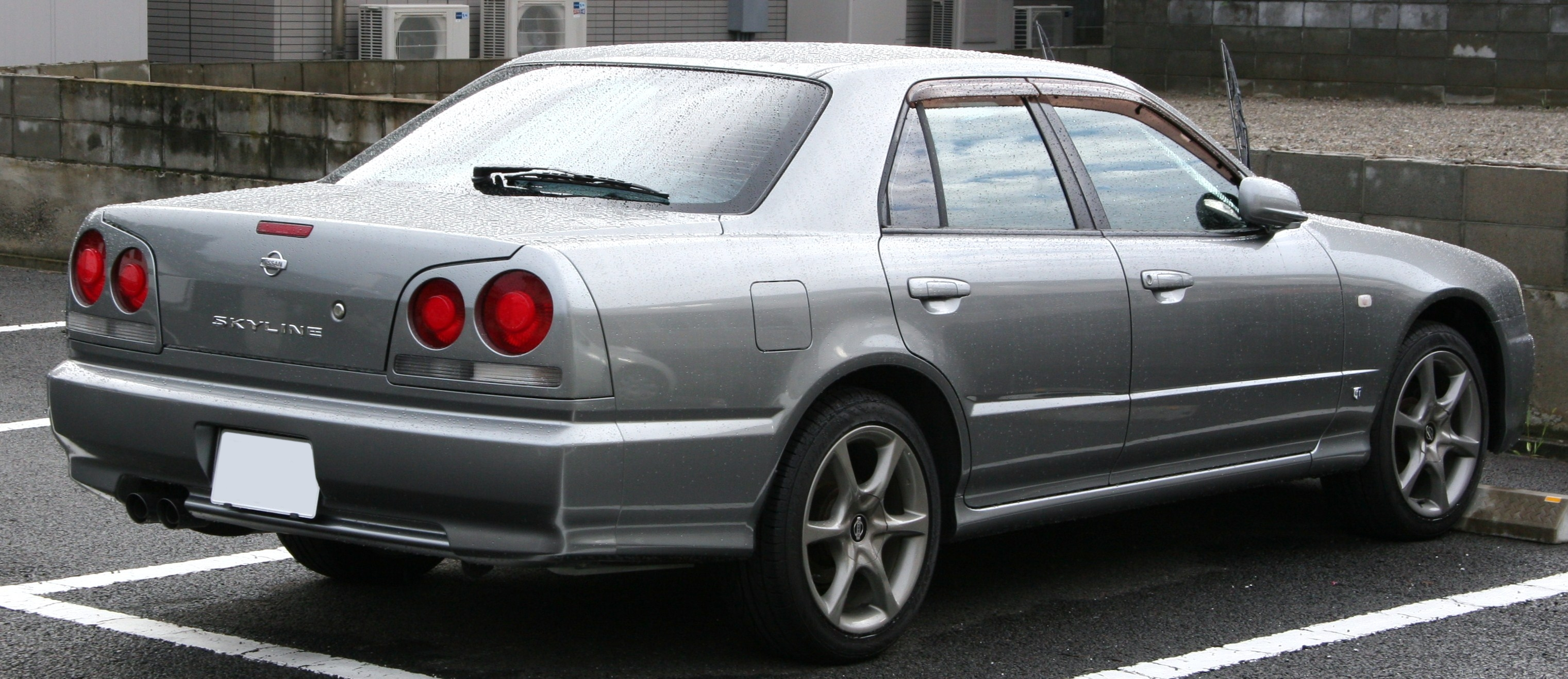
Rear view Skyline 25GT-V sedan

=== Models ===
4 Door Variants
Grade Model	Model Code	Engine	Power Torque	Transmission	Engine Layout
GT GT Special Edition	HR34	RB20DE 2.0L	155 PS (114 kW; 153 hp), 186 N⋅m (137 lb⋅ft)	E-ATx; 5MT	RWD
25GT 25GT-V 25GT-X	ER34	RB25DE NEO 2.5L	200 PS (147 kW; 197 hp), 255 N⋅m (188 lb⋅ft)	M-ATx; 5MT	RWD
25GT-FOUR 25GT-FOUR L selection 25GT-X FOUR	ENR34	RB25DE 2.5L	190 PS (140 kW; 187 hp), 255 N⋅m (188 lb⋅ft)	E-ATx; 5MT	4WD
25GT Turbo 25GT-X Turbo	ER34	RB25DET 2.5 L	280 PS (206 kW; 276 hp), 343 N⋅m (253 lb⋅ft)	M-ATx; 5MT	RWD
2 Door Variants
Grade Model	Model Code	Engine	Power Torque	Transmission	Engine Layout
GT	HR34	RB20DE 2.0L	155 PS (114 kW; 153 hp), 186 N⋅m (137 lb⋅ft)	E-ATx	RWD
25GT 25GT-V	ER34	RB25DE NEO 2.5L	200 PS (147 kW; 197 hp), 255 N⋅m (188 lb⋅ft)	M-ATx; 5MT	RWD
25GT-FOUR	ENR34	RB25DE 2.5L	190 PS (140 kW; 187 hp), 255 N⋅m (188 lb⋅ft)	E-ATx	4WD
25GT Turbo	ER34	RB25DET 2.5 L	280 PS (206 kW; 276 hp), 343 N⋅m (253 lb⋅ft)	M-ATx; 5MT	RWD

=== GT-R (BNR34) ===
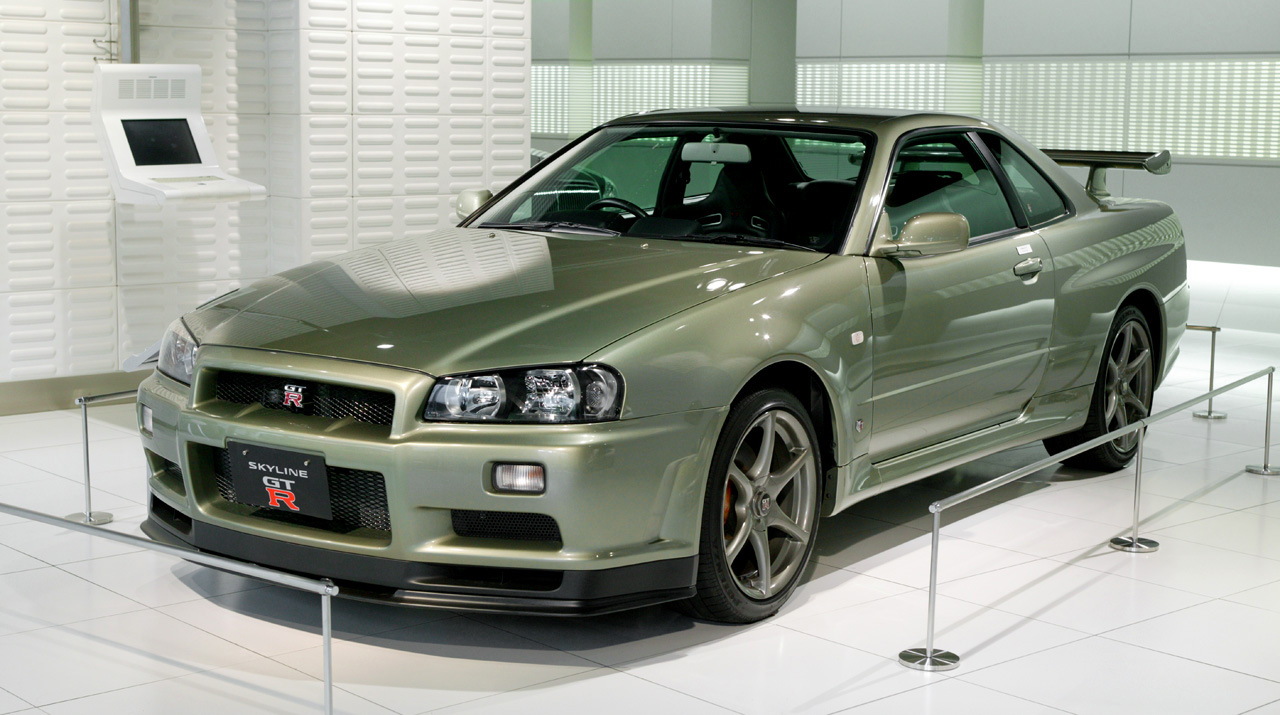
Nissan Skyline R34 GT-R M-Spec Nür finished in Millennium Jade

The GT-R reappeared in January 1999, with a revised chassis and other updates. The R34 turbos received a ball bearing core. The R34 N1 turbos had a metal exhaust wheel, and ball bearing center section. The turbo outlet pipes were changed from cast to formed metal outlets. The intercooler outlet side and rear turbo dump pipe had temperature probes fitted in the V-spec models.

Models: (all ATTESA E-TS Pro AWD)

- GT-R – 2.6 L RB26DETT twin-turbo I6, 280 PS (206 kW; 276 hp) advertised
- GT-R V·spec – Additional aero parts, brake ventilation ducts, diffuser, ALSD.
- GT-R V·spec UK – V·spec with three additional oil coolers, an extra measurement on the MFD, leather interior, speedometer with mph, new features on the display (Only 80 made).
- GT-R V·spec N1 - V·spec with Blueprinted N1 motor, no A/C, no stereo, no rear wiper, basic interior trim. (only 45 made)
- GT-R V·spec II – As V·spec + carbon fiber hood with NACA duct.
- GT-R V·spec II N1 – V·spec II with N1 motor, no A/C, no stereo, no rear wiper, basic interior trim. (only 18 made)
- GT-R M·spec – Leather interior, softer suspension with "Ripple Control" dampers, heated seats.
- GT-R V·spec II Nür – As above V·spec II + N1 motor, 300 km/h speedometer. (only 750 made)
- GT-R M·spec Nür – As above M·spec + N1 motor, 300 km/h speedometer. (only 253 made)
- GT-R NISMO S-tune- The S-tune - Tuning package from Nismo, targeting street drivers that want to bring out the "potential" of their GT-R. (Only 14 made)
- GT-R NISMO R-tune- Same as the S-tune, the R-tune is further modified with more emphasize towards circuit racing. (Only 3 made)
- GT-R NISMO Z-tune – 2.8 L (bored and stroked) 'RB28DETT' twin-turbo I6, 500 PS (368 kW; 493 hp), 540 N⋅m (398 lb⋅ft) Z1 and Z2 (Only 20 made)
- GT-R NISMO Clubman Race Spec : this special edition of the R34 Skyline GT-R is a mix of R-Tune, S-Tune and Z-Tune variants. (Only 19 made)

=== Skyline GT-R M·spec (2001–02) ===
The M·spec is a version of the Nissan Skyline GT-R with ripple control shock absorbers, M·spec-specific leather seat (front/rear seat, with front seat heater), 3-spoke leather wrapped steering wheel, and a choice of four body colors (including Silica Breath (RPM/multi flex color)).

The vehicle went on sale on 8 May 2001.

=== Skyline GT-R M·spec Nür, V·spec II Nür (2002) ===
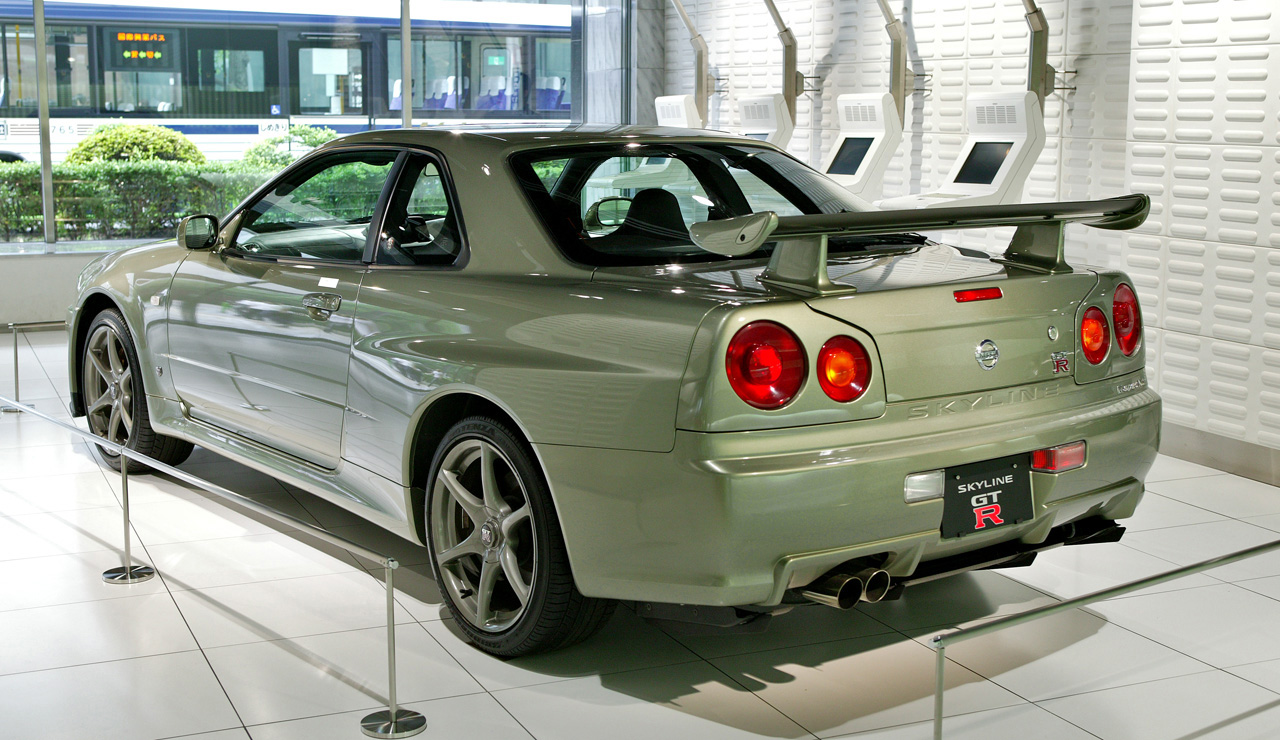
Nissan Skyline GT-R M·spec Nür (BNR34)

The M·spec Nür and V·spec II Nür are limited (1000 units) versions of the Nissan Skyline GT-R with Super Taikyu N1 spec engine, for the Japanese market. It includes a 300 km/h speedometer, 3d grade name emblem, and an additional body color option (Millennium Jade Metallic).

The vehicles went on sale on 26 February 2002.

=== Production ===
Production of the Skyline R34 GT-R ended on 29 August 2002.

Since the beginning of Skyline GT-R M·spec Nür and V·spec II Nür sales, 25% of vehicles sold were M・spec Nür, 75 of vehicles sold were V·spec II Nür. Millennium Jade, White Pearl, and White body colors have been used on 28%, 22%, 16% of M·spec Nür and V·spec II Nür vehicles respectively.

=== Marketing ===
As part of the Type R34 GT-R final campaign, all Skyline GT-R customers received an official GT-R photo album before 24 January 2002.

=== United States ===
A small number of R34 GT-Rs are legal in the United States despite not being compliant with the NHTSA 25-year import law prior to 2024. A California-based importer called Motorex crash-tested an R33, submitted emissions paperwork and certification to the Environmental Protection Agency, and modified others to meet US approval. The company ran into legal trouble after importing R32 and R34 models, but telling the government they were R33s. Motorex also stopped making the required modifications (safety, US-spec gauges and reflectors, etc.) needed in order for the cars to be sold in the US. After a 2005 raid on the company, Motorex was shut down. The government then sent letters to the owners of the disputed cars and made them US legal, since the cars were imported under false pretenses. An estimated twelve R34 GT-Rs are US-legal as a result of this.

In 2018, the first R34 GT-R was legally imported under the FMVSS's "Show & Display" exemption. Currently, only the first 282 V-Spec GT-Rs produced for 1999, finished in LV4 Midnight Purple II paint, and the 285 M-Spec Nür models, as well as the 38 V-Spec N1 models and the 18 V-Spec II N1 models finished in QM1 White are eligible under this exemption. However, only a minimum of 199 of the 11,578 models of the R34 GT-R produced from 1999 to 2004 had been painted in LV4 Midnight Purple II according to GT-R Registry claims.

The R34 GT-R would eventually become legally importable in the United States starting in 2024 in accordance to the 25-year rule. The first R34 GT-Rs legally imported into the United States were the initial 1999 models manufactured from January 1999, which had turned 25 years old by January 2024. These vehicles, due to their age, do not need to comply with any federal safety and emissions regulations. R34 GT-Rs that were previously imported under the FMVSS's "Show & Display" exemption will also become fully legal for road use under the 25-year rule as well, and other R34 GT-Rs manufactured from 2000 to 2004 will also become legal for US import from 2025 up to 2029.

== Eleventh generation (V35; 2001) ==
Eleventh generation
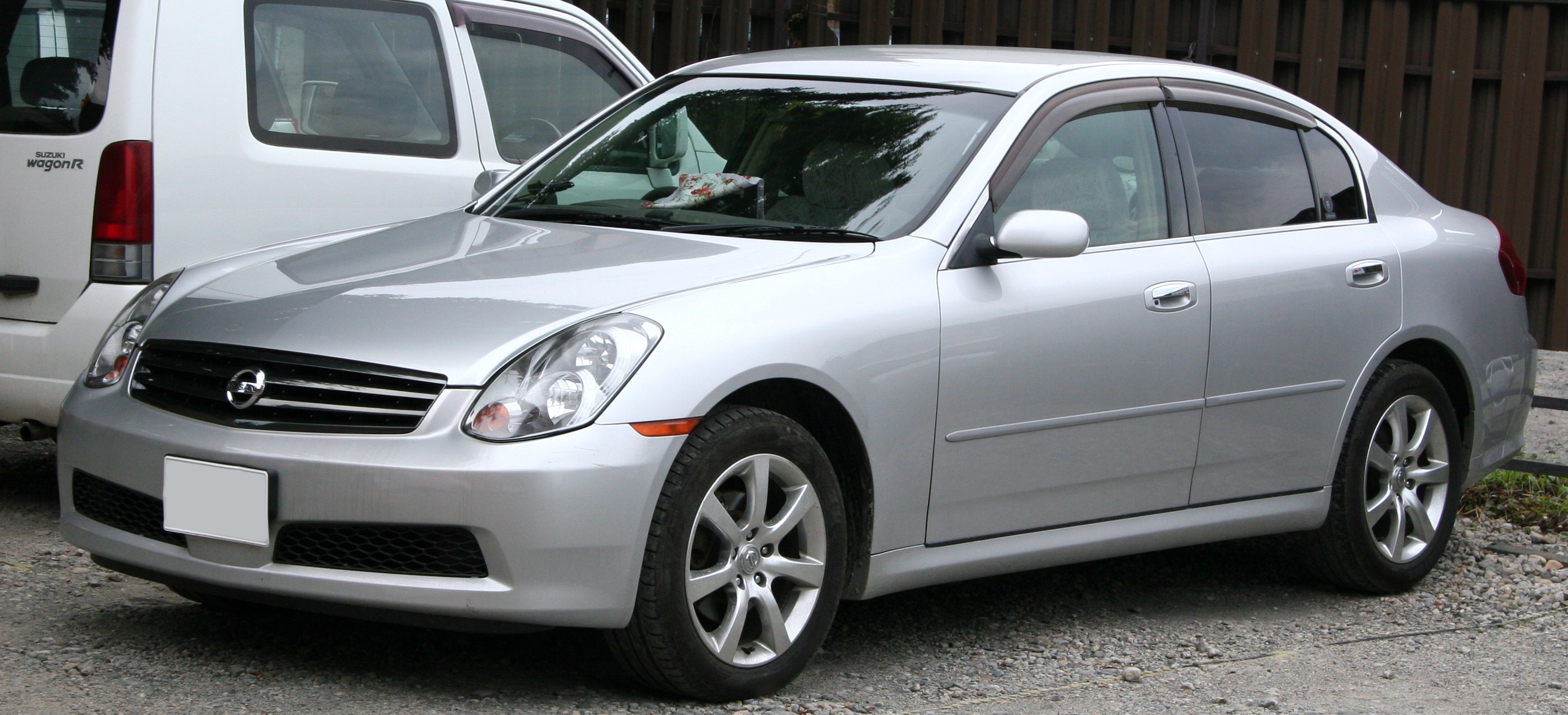
- 2004–2006 Nissan Skyline Sedan 250GT Four (V35, Japan)

Overview
- Model code: V35
- Also called: Infiniti G35
- Production: June 2001– November 2006 (sedan); January 2003 – October 2007 (coupe)
- Assembly: Japan: Kaminokawa, Tochigi
- Designer: Hiroshi Hasegawa (1998, 2000)

Body and chassis
- Body style: 4-door sedan; 2-door coupe
- Layout: Front-engine, rear-wheel-drive; Front-engine, four-wheel-drive
- Platform: Nissan FM platform
- Related: Nissan Stagea (MC35); Nissan 350Z

Powertrain
- Engine: Gasoline: 2.5 L VQ25DD V6; 3.0 L VQ30DD V6; 3.5 L VQ35DE V6
- Transmission: 4/5-speed automatic; 5/6-speed manual; 8-speed Jatco JR006E: Toroidal CVT (Nissan Skyline 350GT-8)

Dimensions
- Wheelbase: 2,850 mm (112.2 in)
- Length: 4,630 mm (182.3 in) (coupe); 4,735 mm (186.4 in) (sedan)
- Width: 1,815 mm (71.5 in) (coupe); 1,750 mm (68.9 in) (sedan)
- Height: 1,390 mm (54.7 in) (coupe); 1,465 mm (57.7 in) (sedan)
- Curb weight: 1,517 kg (3,344 lb) (coupe 6MT); 1,537.0 kg (3,388.4 lb) (coupe 5AT); 1,540 kg (3,395 lb) (sedan 6MT); 1,447–1,597 kg (3,190–3,520 lb) (sedan 4/5AT); 1,617 kg (3,564 lb) (sedan CVT-8)

The 11th-generation (V35) Nissan Skyline was introduced in June 2001. It was the first Skyline since the C10 series not to be based on the platform shared with its former luxury twin, the Laurel (which was due to be discontinued in 2002), and instead was based on the then-new FM platform that was shared with the Z33 series Fairlady Z. The all-new Skyline used a front-midship engine (VQ35DE and others as below), rear-wheel-drive layout (four-wheel drive was available for the sedan) to achieve a 52%/48% weight distribution. It was sold at reorganized Nissan Japanese dealerships called Nissan Red Stage alongside the Fairlady Z, the latter of which was sold exclusively at Nissan Blue Stage Japanese dealerships.

The vehicles went on sale on 18 June 2001. Early models included the 250GT, 250GTe, and 300GT. Early Skyline Driving Helper model includes 250GT. The Skyline 250GT FOUR sedan includes ATTESA E-TS all wheel drive with 50:50 synchro mode, VQ25DD (NEO Di) engine, and a five-speed automatic transmission, which went on sale on 26 September 2001. The Skyline 250GTm sedan went on sale on 13 January 2002, while the Skyline 350GT-8 sedan went on sale on 19 February 2002.

Beginning in 2002, the Skyline sedan was sold in North America, where it was marketed as the Infiniti G35. The V35 was also the first Skyline made for export to the United States, being sold under the aforementioned brand name alongside its platform-mate twin, the Nissan 350Z.

The V35 broke with previous Skyline tradition - it offered no straight-six engine, no turbocharger since the R30, and no GT-R version, a decision which extended to all later Skylines. The intention had been for the model to use a different name, a decision reversed by Renault/Nissan CEO Carlos Ghosn, who choose to gear the V35 towards the luxury-sport market. Billing the 350Z as a pure sports car, Nissan put a slightly more powerful VQ35DE in the 350Z, and while both the Skyline and the 350Z shared the same platform, the 350Z had additional bracing, under-body aero parts, and weighed 100 kg (220 lb) less. As of 1 July 2001 (two weeks after launch), total domestic Japanese Skyline orders had reached 4200 units.

When the V35 Skyline sedan was announced in June 2001, it was announced that a coupe would be released one year later. However, the CPV35 coupe was actually released in January 2003, about a year and a half later, six months later than planned.

Some fans refer to the V35 as the "New Generation Skyline" due to drastic changes between its R34 predecessor and the new V35. Japanese tuners mostly ignored the V35 Skyline; the 2006 Tsukuba Super Lap Battle had not a single V35 entrant. Tuners such as Mines, Amuse, Hosaka, Garage Defend, M Speed, Nagisa, MCR, HKS, & Top Secret continued developing R32-R34 GT-Rs as time attack cars. Top Secret did tune a V35 but replaced the original VQ35DE V6 engine with a twin-turbo VK45DE V8 engine. Signal USA also entered a V35 in Formula D but replaced the original six-cylinder VQ35DE engine with the turbocharged four-cylinder SR20DET engine.

While this generation (and the next generation) did not have any turbocharged engines, they later returned with the V37 series when the 2.0 L Mercedes-Benz M274 turbo I4 engine was introduced; twin-turbo engines returned with the 2019 update of the same generation with the introduction of a 3.0 L VR30DDTT twin-turbo V6 engine, which replaced the previous M274 turbo engine.

Models:

- 250GT (V35) – 2.5 L VQ25DD V6, 215 PS (212 hp; 158 kW), 270 N⋅m (199 lb⋅ft)
- 250GT Four (NV35) – 2.5 L VQ25DD V6, 215 PS (212 hp; 158 kW), 270 N⋅m (199 lb⋅ft) 4WD
- 300GT (HV35) – 3.0 L VQ30DD V6, 260 PS (256 hp; 191 kW), 324 N⋅m (239 lb⋅ft)
- 350GT-8 (PV35) – 3.5 L VQ35DE V6, 272 PS (268 hp; 200 kW), 353 N⋅m (260 lb⋅ft)
- 350GT Coupe (CPV35) – 3.5 L VQ35DE V6, 280 PS (276 hp; 206 kW), 363 N⋅m (268 lb⋅ft)
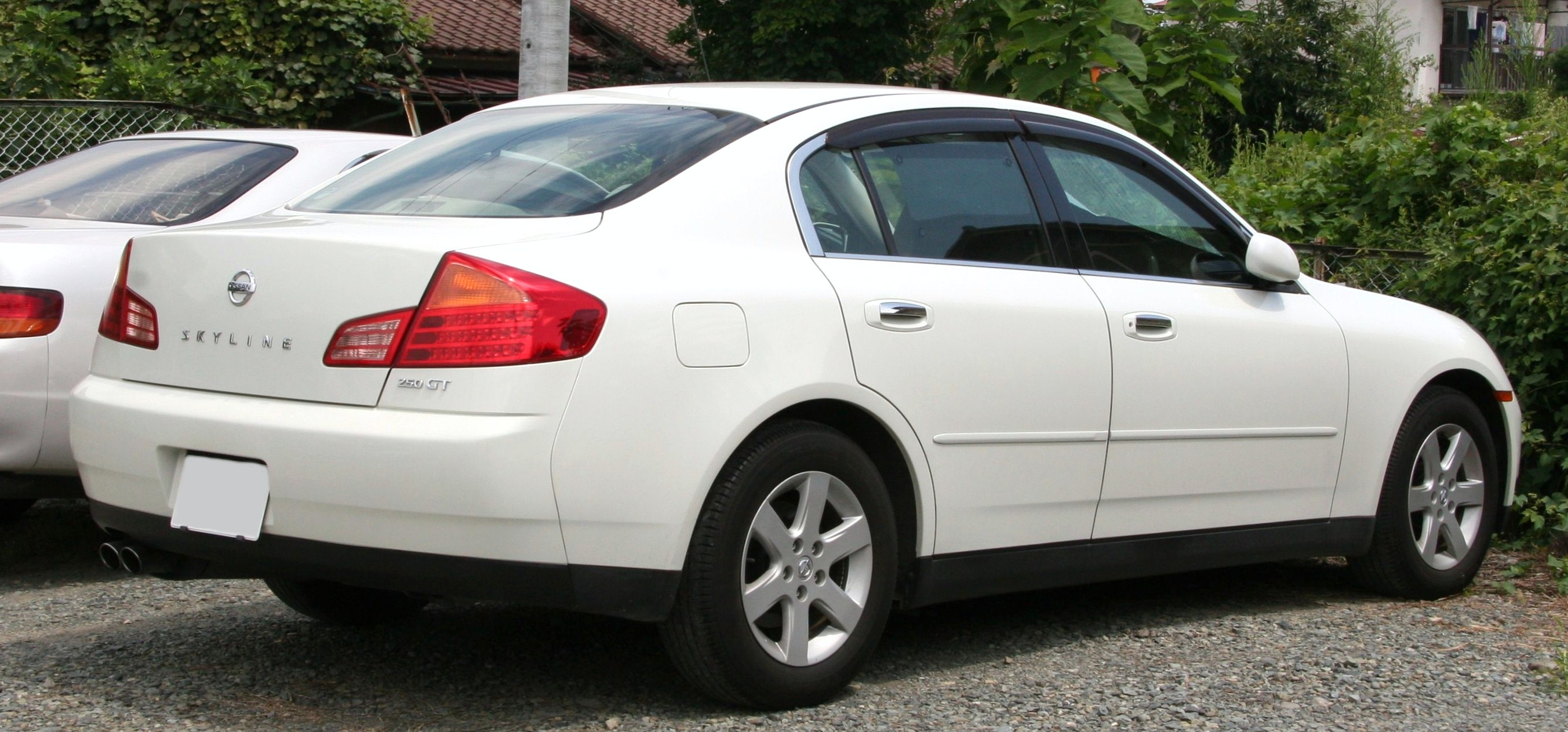
2003–2004 Nissan Skyline Sedan 250GT (V35, Japan)

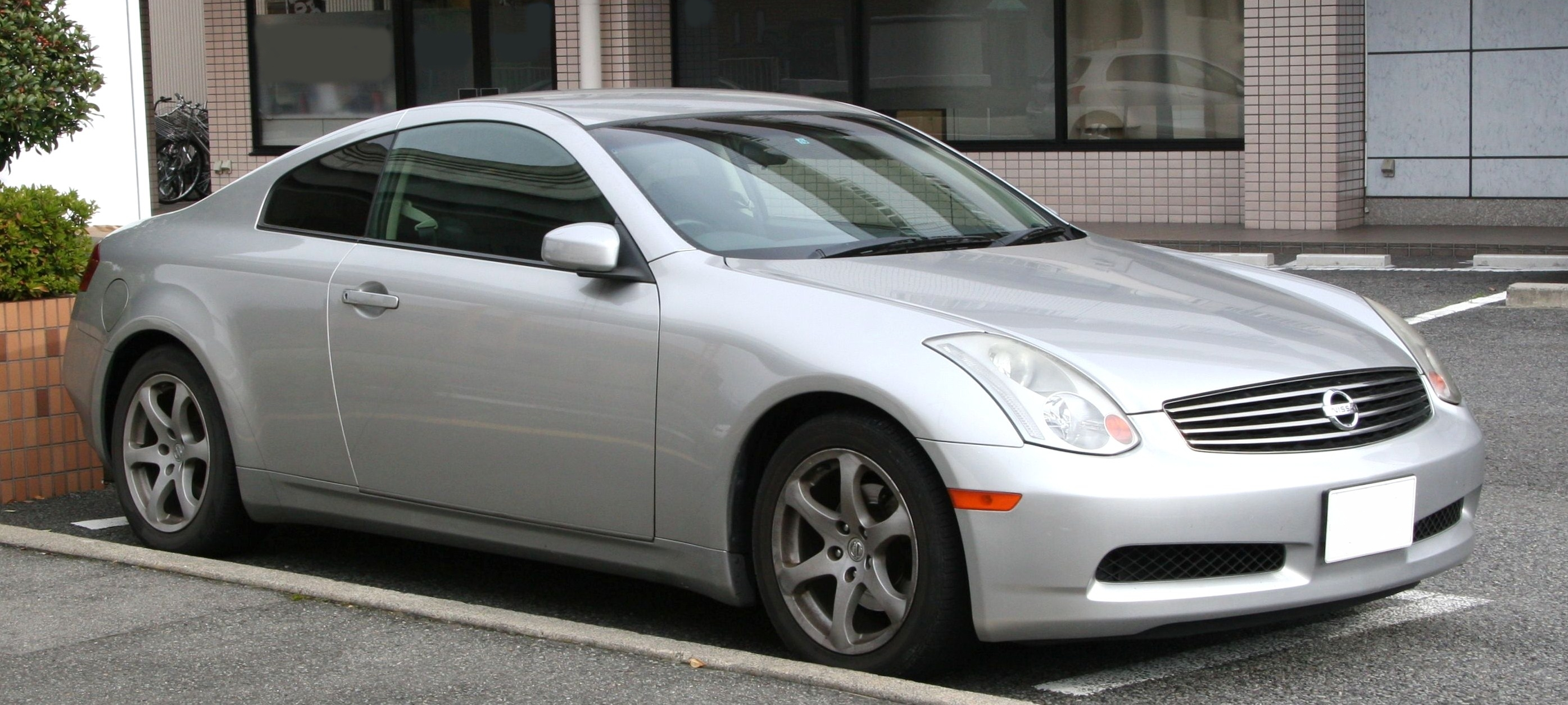
2003–2005 Nissan Skyline Coupe 350GT (CPV35, Japan)

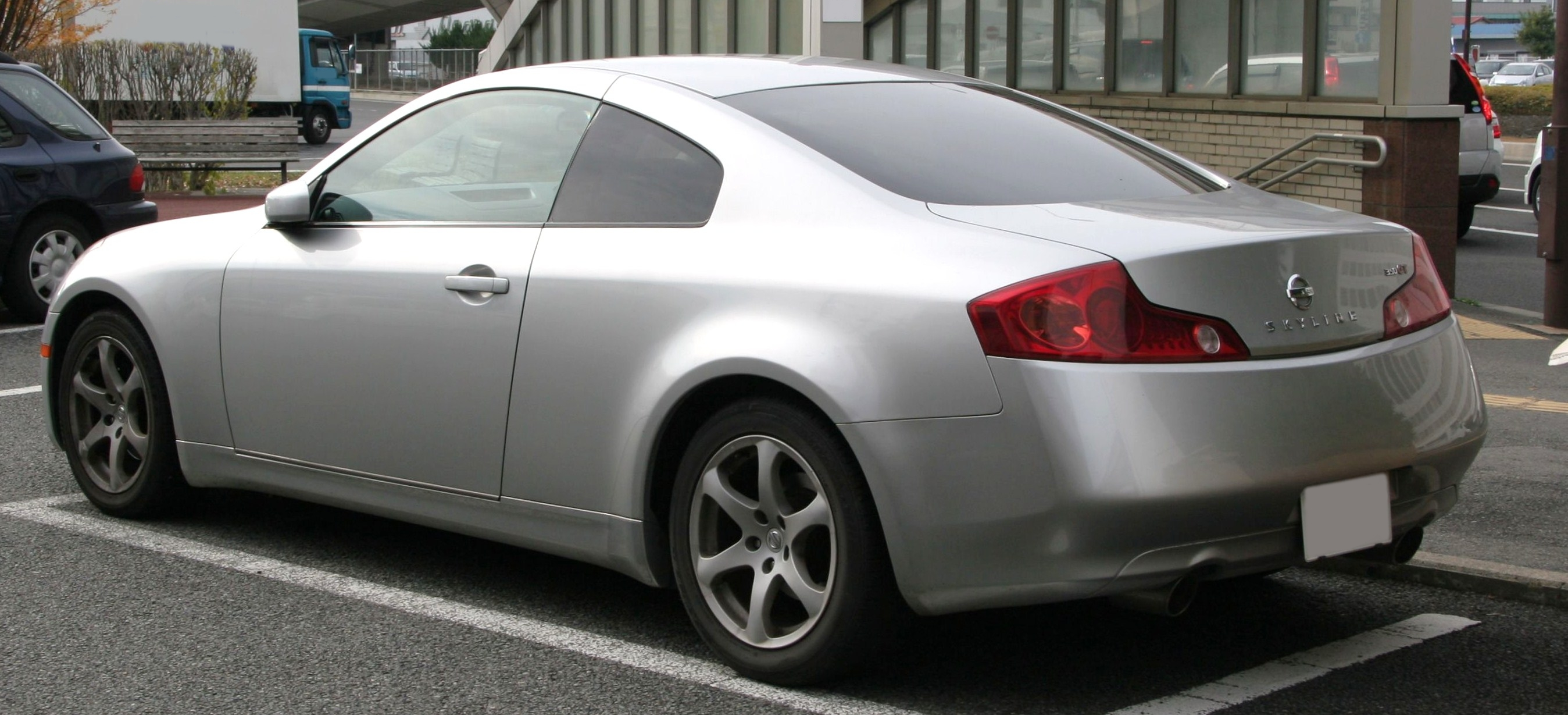
2003–2005 Nissan Skyline Coupe 350GT (CPV35, Japan)

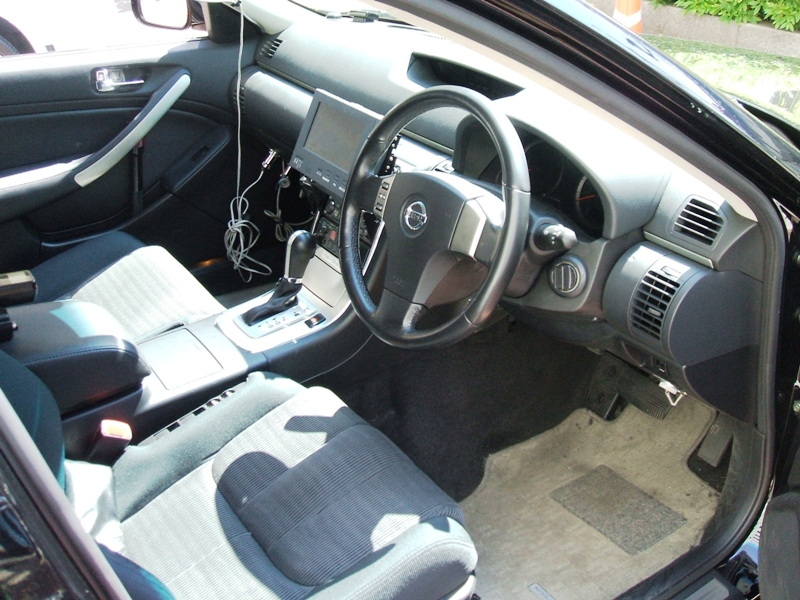
Interior

=== XVL concept (1999) ===
The XVL is a concept car unveiled at the 1999 Tokyo Auto Show, demonstrating the FR L-class platform. It uses a 4-door sedan body style and includes a 3.0L V6 direct-injection gasoline engine.

=== Changes ===
For 2003 the design of the radiator grille, headlamp inner panels, and sills were altered. The interior and mirrors were altered, while the suspension and braking systems were also refined. The Skyline Coupe was introduced as a version of Nissan Skyline Sport Coupe for Japanese market. Also, the Skyline 350GT went on sale. It is a version of the Skyline V35 sport sedan with a six-speed manual transmission for the Japanese market, only available with the 3.5-liter engine. The Skyline 350GT and Skyline 350GT Premium sedan went on sale on 3 June 2003.

For 2004 both coupe and sedans were altered, with updated interiors and improved transmissions. The five-speed automatic transmission on the 350GT Premium now included synchro rev control, while the 6-speed manual transmission was made to vibrate less. For the sedan, the front grille/bumper, foot panel, head lamp, rear bumper, and rear combination lamps were changed. The front seats received active headrest, while the rear middle seat now have a three-point seat belt as standard. There were also some new wheels and a 19-inch option for the coupé. The Skyline's 2005 update again included changes to the head and rear lamps, front bumper, and side sill protectors. Also, 19-inch aluminum alloy wheel became standard for automatic transmission cars. A "plasma cluster ion" full air conditioner with left/right independent temperature settings, heated door mirrors, headlamp auto levelizer (compliant with new legislation) was made standard equipment.

=== Body styles ===
Chassis code	V35	CV35
Body style	sedan	coupe
250GT	2001–06	n/a
250GT FOUR	2001–06	n/a
250GTe	2001	n/a
250GTm	2002–04	n/a
250GTm FOUR	2003–06	n/a
300GT	2001–04	n/a
350GT	2003–04	2003–07
350GT-8	2002–06	n/a
350GT Premium	2003–06	2003–07

== Twelfth generation (V36; 2006) ==
Twelfth generation
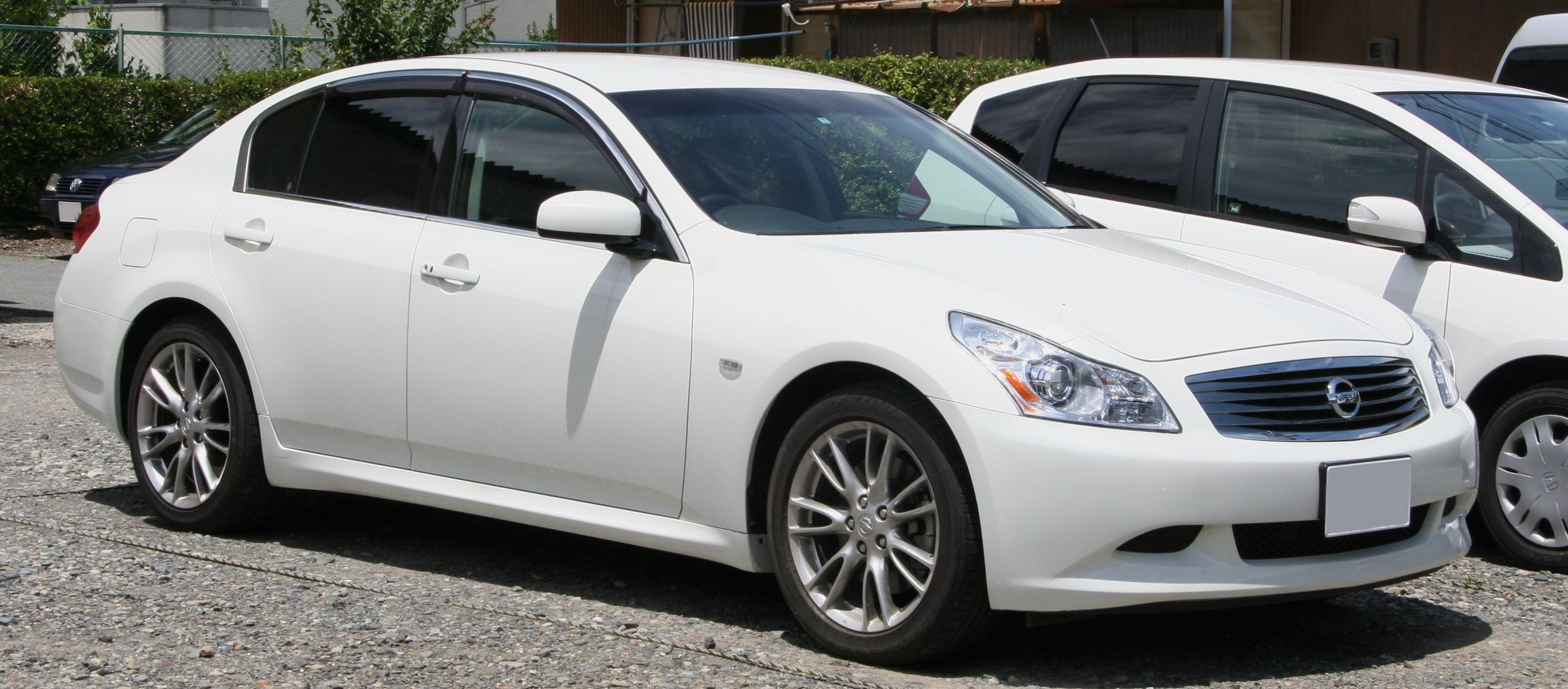
- 2006 Nissan Skyline sedan

Overview
- Model code: V36 (sedan, coupe); J50 (Crossover)
- Also called: Infiniti G35 (2007–2008); Infiniti G37 (2008–2014); Infiniti Q40 (2015); Infiniti Q60 coupe (2014–2016)
- Production: 2006–2014 (sedan); 2007–2016 (coupè); 2009–2016 (crossover)
- Assembly: Japan: Kaminokawa, Tochigi
- Designer: Hideo Komuro (2004); Shinichiro Irie (2005, 2007)

Body and chassis
- Body style: 4-door sedan; 2-door coupe; 5-door crossover SUV
- Layout: Front-engine, rear-wheel-drive; Front-engine, four-wheel-drive
- Platform: Nissan FM platform
- Related: Infiniti FX; Infiniti M; Infiniti Q60; Nissan 350Z; Infiniti G37; Infiniti EX; Nissan 370Z

Powertrain
- Engine: Gasoline: 2.5 L VQ25HR V6; 3.5 L VQ35HR V6; 3.7 L VQ37VHR V6
- Transmission: 6-speed manual; 5-speed automatic; 7-speed automatic

Dimensions
- Wheelbase: 2,850 mm (112.2 in)
- Length: 4,651 mm (183.1 in) (coupe); 4,750 mm (187.0 in) (sedan); 4,656 mm (183.3 in) (convertible)
- Width: 1,852 mm (72.9 in) (convertible); 1,824 mm (71.8 in) (coupe); 1,773 mm (69.8 in) (sedan)
- Height: Convertible: 1,400 mm (55.1 in); Coupe: 1,392 mm (54.8 in) (AT); 1,394 mm (54.9 in) (MT); Sedan: 1,453 mm (57.2 in) (RWD); 1,468 mm (57.8 in) (xAWD sedan); 1,463 mm (57.6 in)

The V36 Skyline was unveiled in November 2006. It was also sold in some markets as the Infiniti G35.

The V36 series basically inherited the concept from the V35, and its predecessor had received high praise from both the market and experts in North America as a D-segment car. To maintain that reputation, development costs were significantly higher than when the Skyline was a car sold exclusively in Japan.

The exterior design basically maintained the same concept as its predecessor, with features such as the double arch grille and round rear combination lamps being carried over, but with a more dynamic design. The front of the V36 also bears a resemblance to the Fuga.

=== Initial release ===
The Skyline Sedan went on sale on 11 November 2006, with an update to the Skyline Coupe beginning in late 2007. The available trim levels includes the "250GT" equipped with the VQ25HR engine and the "350GT" equipped with the VQ35HR engine. The model ditched the round headlights of the V35 for sharper looking units.

The 250GT sedan is sold as the Infiniti G25 sedan outside of Japan. All 250GT models, except the "Type S" and "Type SP," were offered with four-wheel drive using the ATTESA E-TS system. The 17-inch wheels are standard for all model ranges, except for the 250GT Type S, which has 18-inch wheels.

As previously, the 350GT sedan is sold as the Infiniti G35 sedan outside of Japan. Four-wheel active steering is available in Type S and Type SP as option. The 3.5-litre engine variant was discontinued in December 2008 replaced with the 3.7-litre engine. The 370GT formed the basis of the export-market Infiniti G37.

On 13 May 2008, Nissan announced that a convertible variant of the Infiniti G37 would be produced for the 2009 model year. The convertible version was not offered in Japan, built exclusively for the European and North American markets.

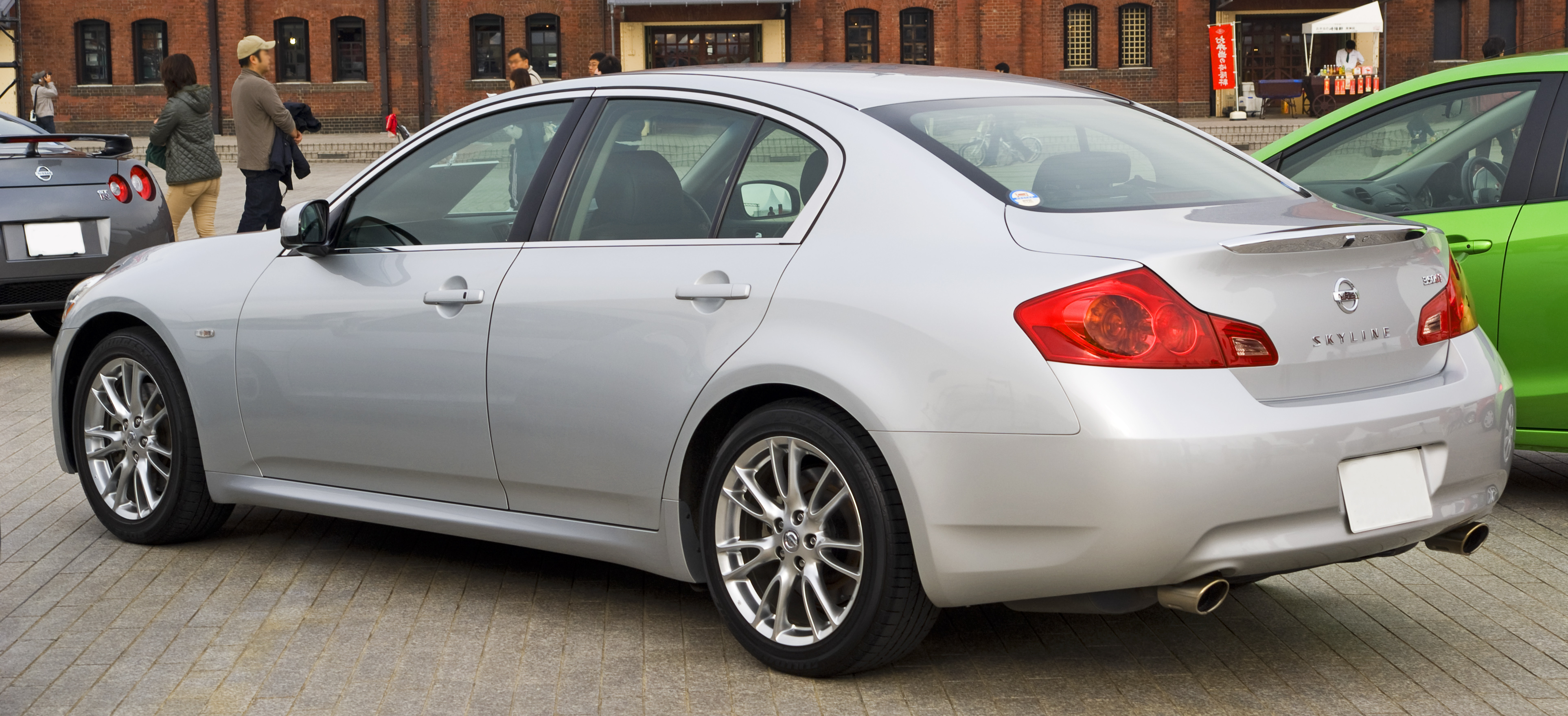
2007 Nissan Skyline Sedan (V36, Japan)

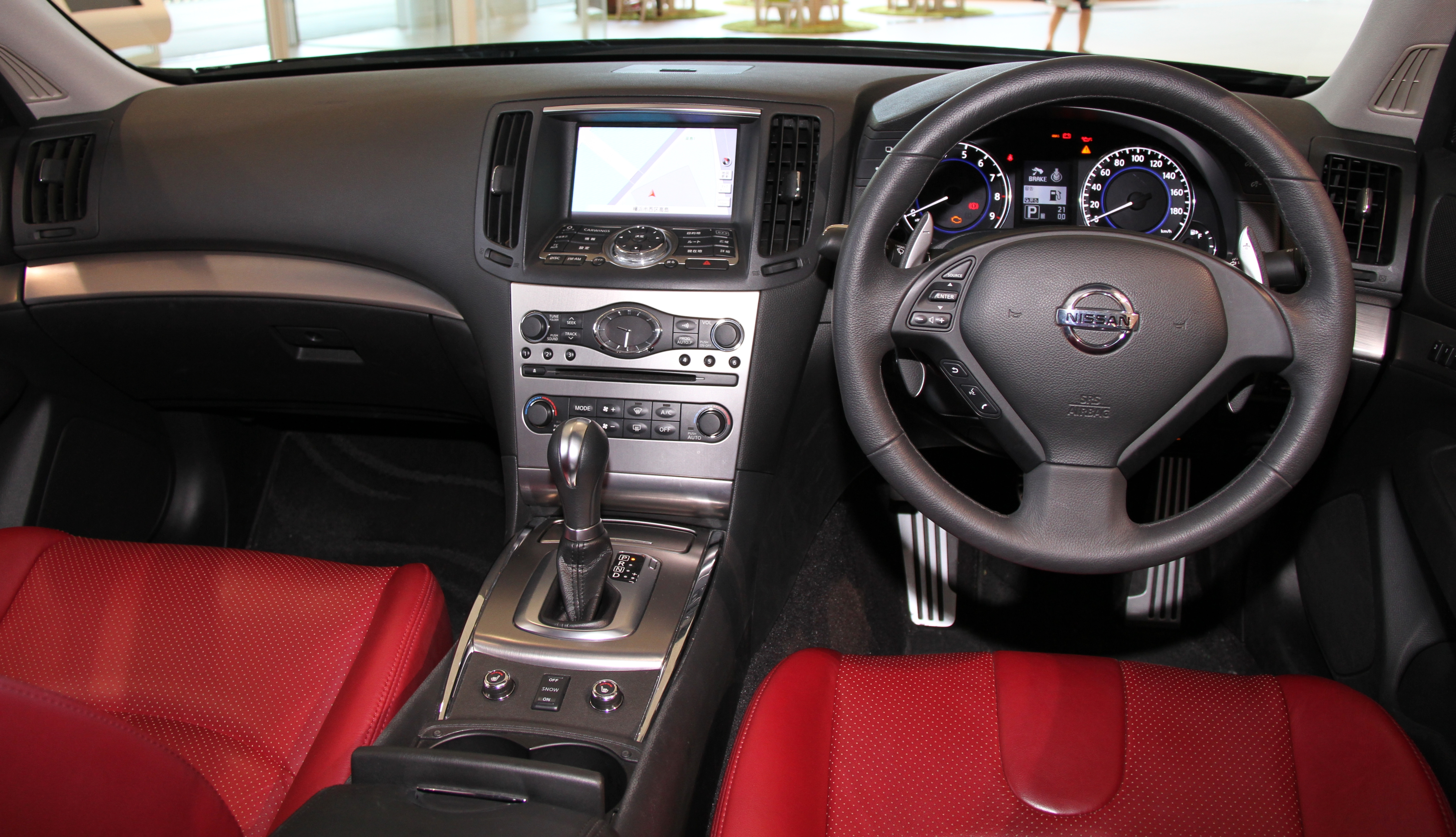
Interior

=== Skyline Coupe ===
It was unveiled at the New York International Auto Show in April 2007 as an Infiniti and was first introduced to the North American market in August of the same year as the Infiniti G37 Coupe. In Japan, it was released in October 2007, almost a year after the release of the V36 sedan. All production, including the G37 Coupe, was carried out at Nissan Motor's Tochigi Plant.

The Skyline Coupe went on sale on 2 October 2007. It was offered in 370GT, 370GT Type P, 370GT Type S and 370GT Type SP. All models was equipped with the 3.7-litre VQ37VHR V6 motor has a power output of 330 hp (246 kW; 335 PS).

Two types of transmissions were available: automatic and manual. Initially, the automatic transmission was a JATCO JR507E full-range electronically controlled 5-speed automatic transmission with manual mode, which was almost identical to the one used in the Fuga.

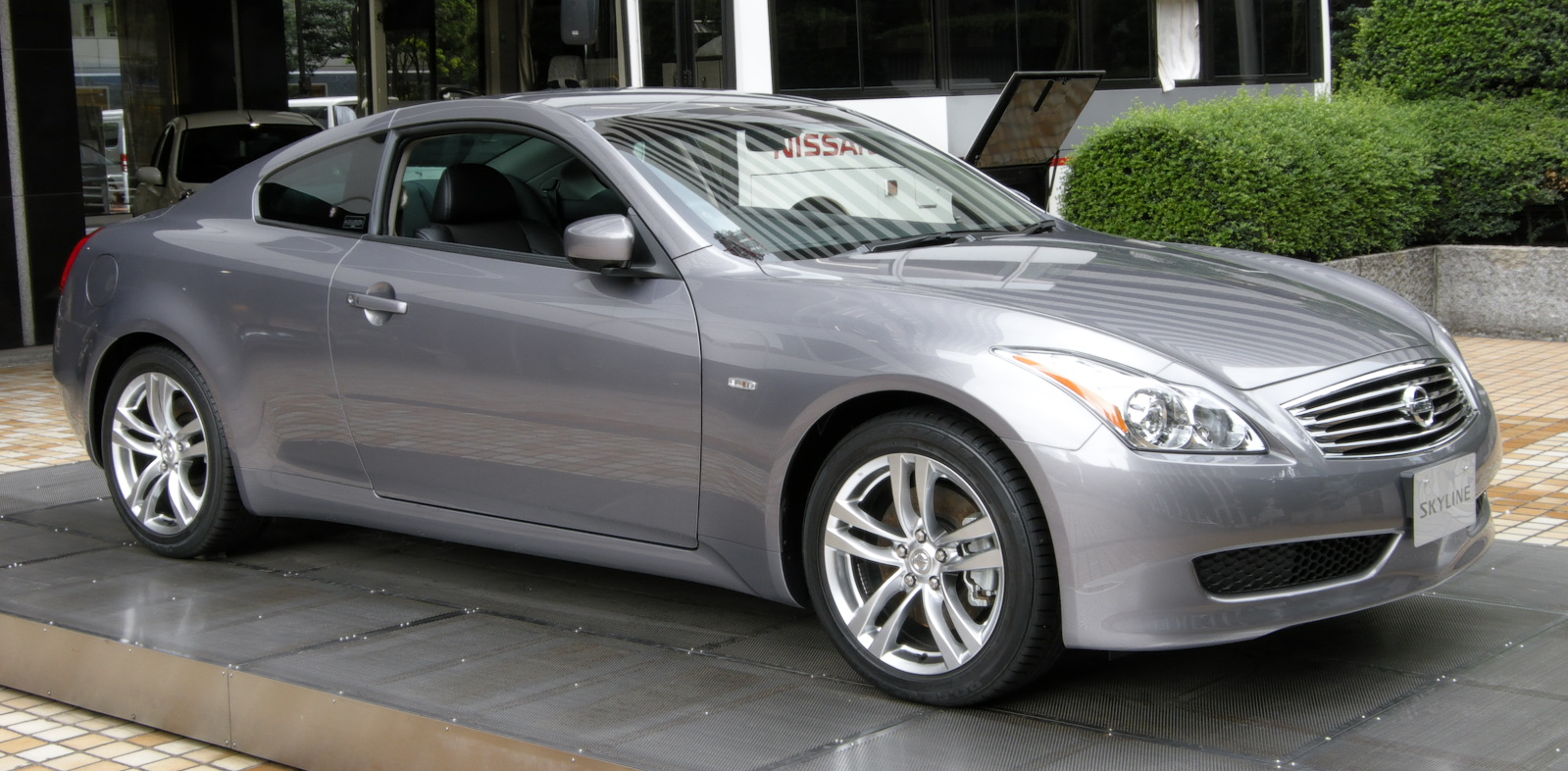
2007 Nissan Skyline Coupe 370GT (CV36, Japan)

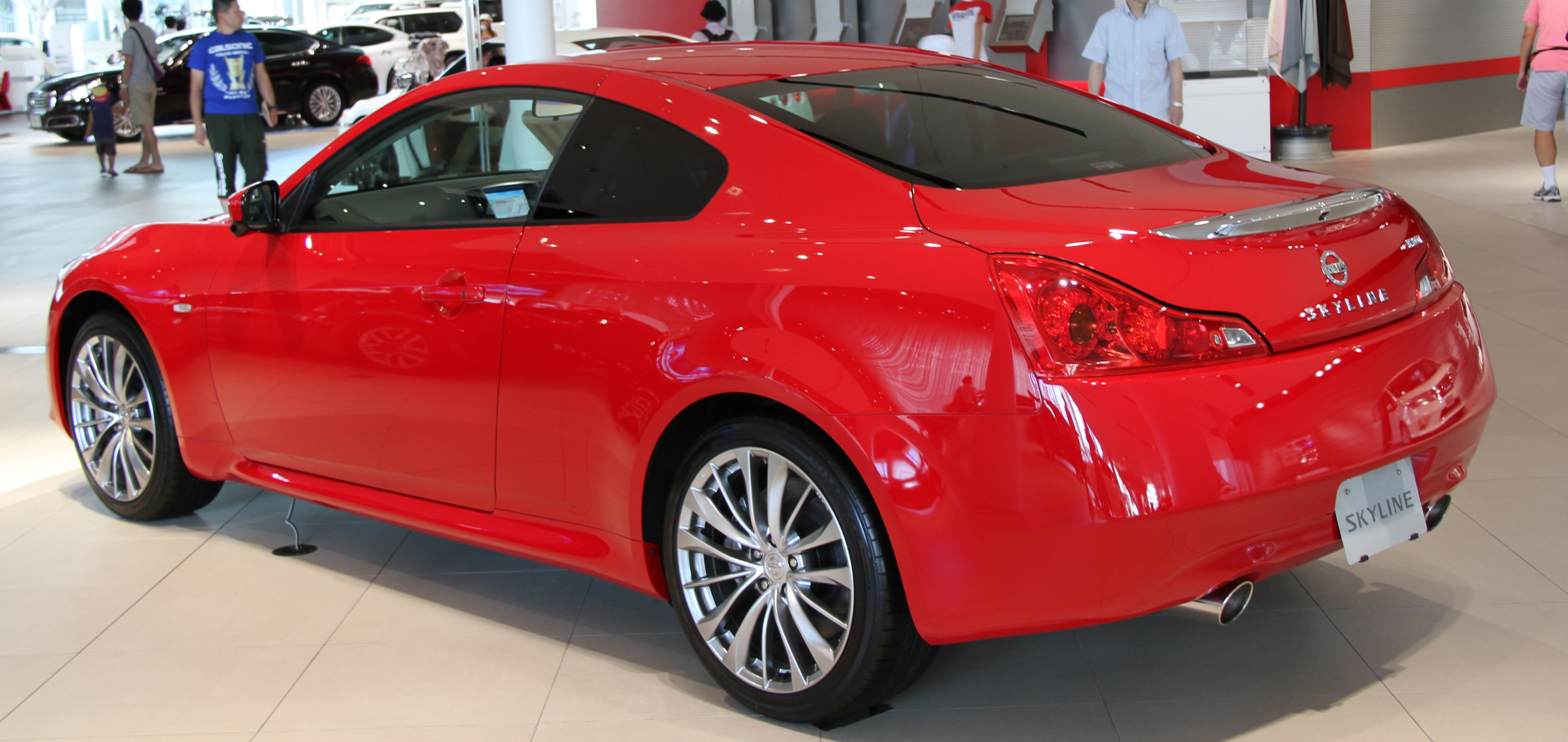
2012 Nissan Skyline Coupe 370GT Type S (CV36, Japan)

==== 50th Limited (2007–2008) ====
The 50th Limited is an option for Skyline Sedan models 250GT Type P, 350GT Type P, 350GT Type SP, and 250GT FOUR Type P, commemorating the 50th anniversary of the Nissan Skyline. The interior is marked with anniversary red leather seats and serial-numbered front glass. The 50th Limited was unveiled in the 2007 Tokyo Motor Show. The 50th Limited models, along with 250GT Type S, went on sale from 27 November 2007 until 31 March 2008.

==== Skyline Coupe Aero-Sports Concept, Skyline Aero Package Concept (2008) ====
The Skyline Aero Package Concept is a version of the Skyline Sedan 350GT Type SP with dynamic front and rear spoilers, re-designed sporty front grille and chromed alloy wheels.

The Skyline Coupe Aero-Sports Concept is a version of the Skyline Coupe 370GT Type SP with new exterior and interior looks with new aero parts and seat materials.

The vehicles were unveiled at the 2008 Tokyo Auto Salon, followed by the 2008 Nissan Customize Car Show.

==== Marketing ====
As part of the Nissan Skyline's 50th anniversary, information on Nissan Skyline could be found in the PlayStation 3 version of the Gran Turismo video game.

As part of the Nissan Skyline's launch event, a Touch&Feel - New SKYLINE event began in Nissan Gallery.

As part of the Nissan Skyline's 50th anniversary, a Grand Touring Japan event took place starting on 10 March 2007. Following the event, the Grand Touring ~ Legend & Future event was staged at Tokyo Midtown, showcasing 12 generations of the Nissan Skyline. The event continued in Nissan Gallery at Ginza with a chance of winning a Skyline postcard.

As part of the Nissan Skyline's 50th anniversary, Warner Music Japan published Skyline 50th Anniversary CD, featuring music from Nissan Skyline commercials. Skyline model cars had also been produced.

As part of the Nissan Skyline Coupe launch, a series of 15 accessories under the SKYLINE collection label, including wallet, card case, key ring (leather, engine cover, and 370GT), intelligent key case, Zippo lighter, Skyline Coupe T-shirt (grey), SKYLINE COUPE pins (in vibrant red, brilliant silver, strafia blue, white pearl, super black, fountain blue, and lunar mare silver) went on sale at Nissan online shop beginning October 2007.

=== 2007 update ===
Sedan changes include:

- New body color crystal white pearl (3-coat pearl) is added for a total of six color choices
- Uses Skyline Coupe mirror
- Aluminum finisher color change
- Rear middle seat includes adjustable headrest, door lower soft touch material
- V6 engine model uses VQ35HR engine, 5-speed automatic transmission
- Intelligent air conditioner as standard equipment (except 250GT, 250GT FOUR)
- Active ABS as standard equipment
- curtain airbag, side airbag at front seats as standard equipment

=== 2008 update ===
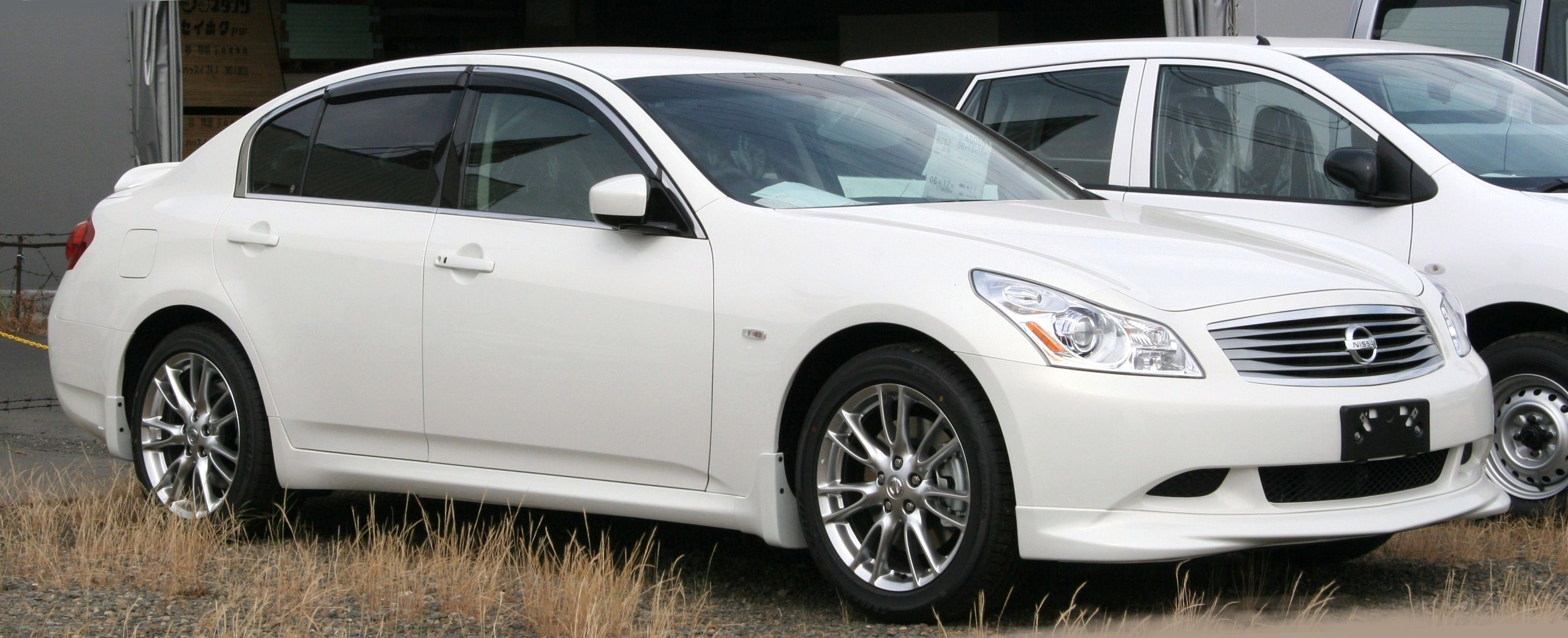
2008–2010 Nissan Skyline sedan (with optional aero parts)

The revised Skyline went on sale on 2 December 2008. It was sold as the 250GT, 250GT Four and 370GT variants. The Coupe models were only offered as the 370GT.

The 370GT sedan was introduced in December 2008, the 370GT sedan is a Japanese version of the Infiniti G37 sedan. It replaced the 350GT sedan. 7-speed automatic transmission. The 18-inch wheels are standard for all model grades, except for the 370GT Type P, which has 17-inch wheels.

=== 2010 Facelift ===
On 8 January 2010, the Skyline sedan and coupe were revised. The 7-speed automatic transmission option for 2-wheel drive Skyline Sedan with the 2.5-liter V6 engine.

The 250GT models (except the type S) receive appearance enhancements designed to create a sharper. In front are a new grille, bumper and headlamps. The fog lights are moved down to the bumper (previously, the fog lights were integrated into the headlights), offering a more aggressive feel. The rear bumper has also been redesigned and there is also a new 17-inch aluminum-alloy wheel design.

The sportier sedan versions (370GT Type SP, 370GT Type SP, 250GT Type S) received a special wider, low-centered body design for a more dynamic, sporty appeal. Changes include a new unique grille, front bumper, headlights, rear bumper and use of black trim for the inner headlamp panels.

Both Sedan and Coupe come with the HDD Carwings navigation system, which had previously been an option on all grades, became standard equipment, and a lower-priced, and navigation-less grade "A Package" was added.

Another minor change was applied to the Coupe and Crossover models and went on sale on 15 November 2010.

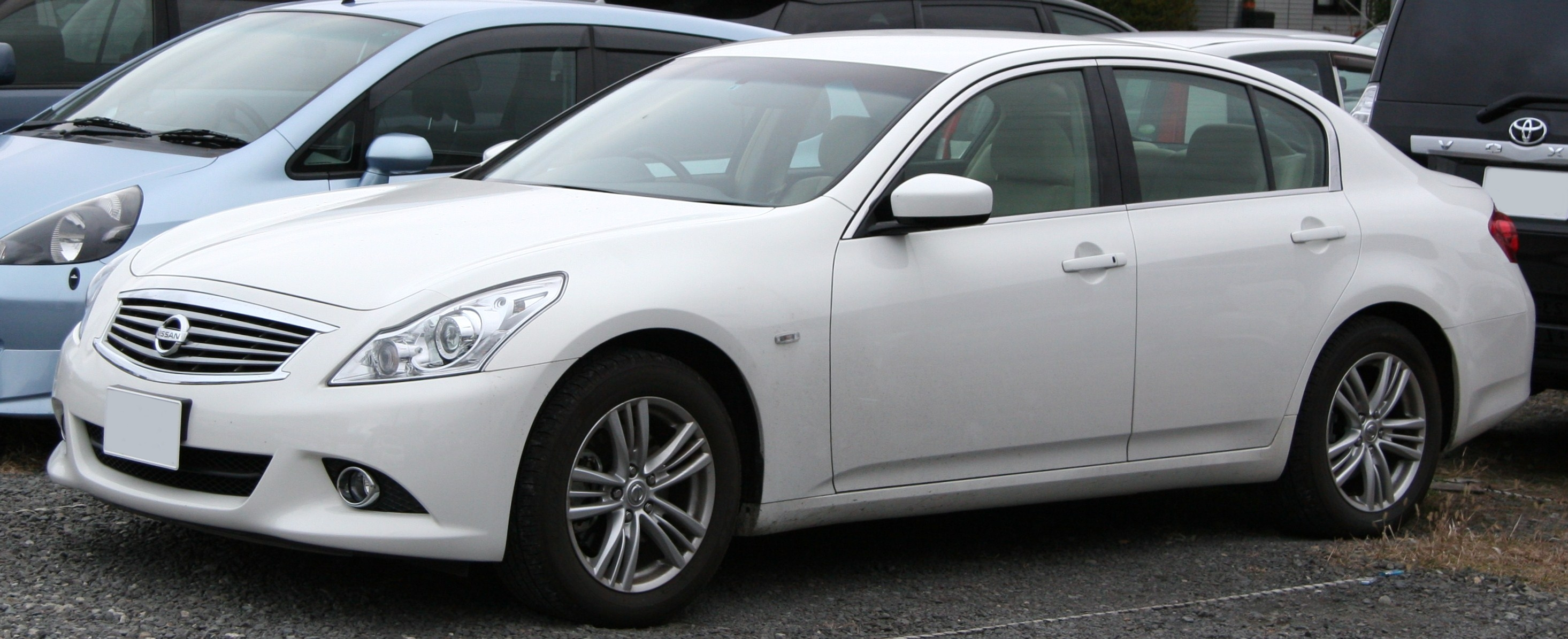
2010 Nissan Skyline Sedan 250 GT (facelift)

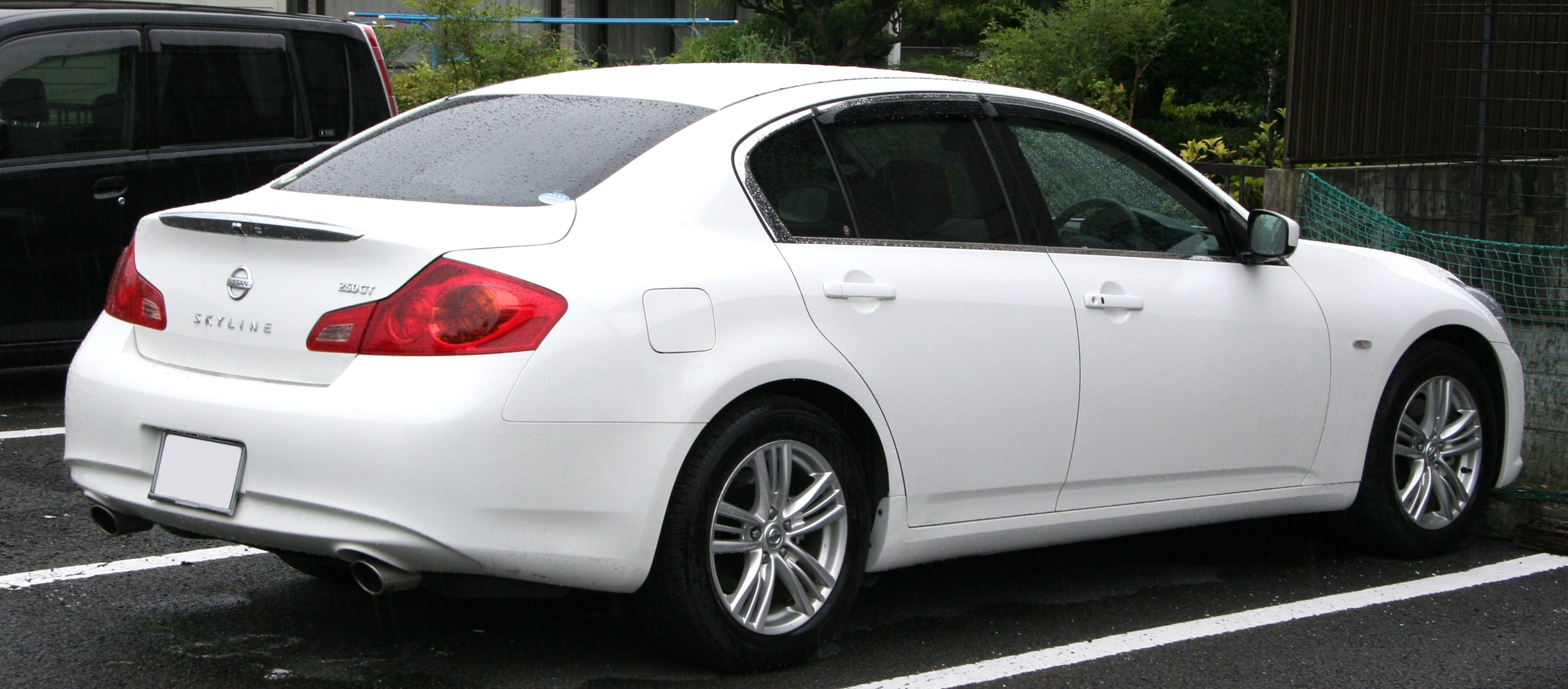
Rear view

==== Skyline 55th Limited Edition (2011–2013) ====
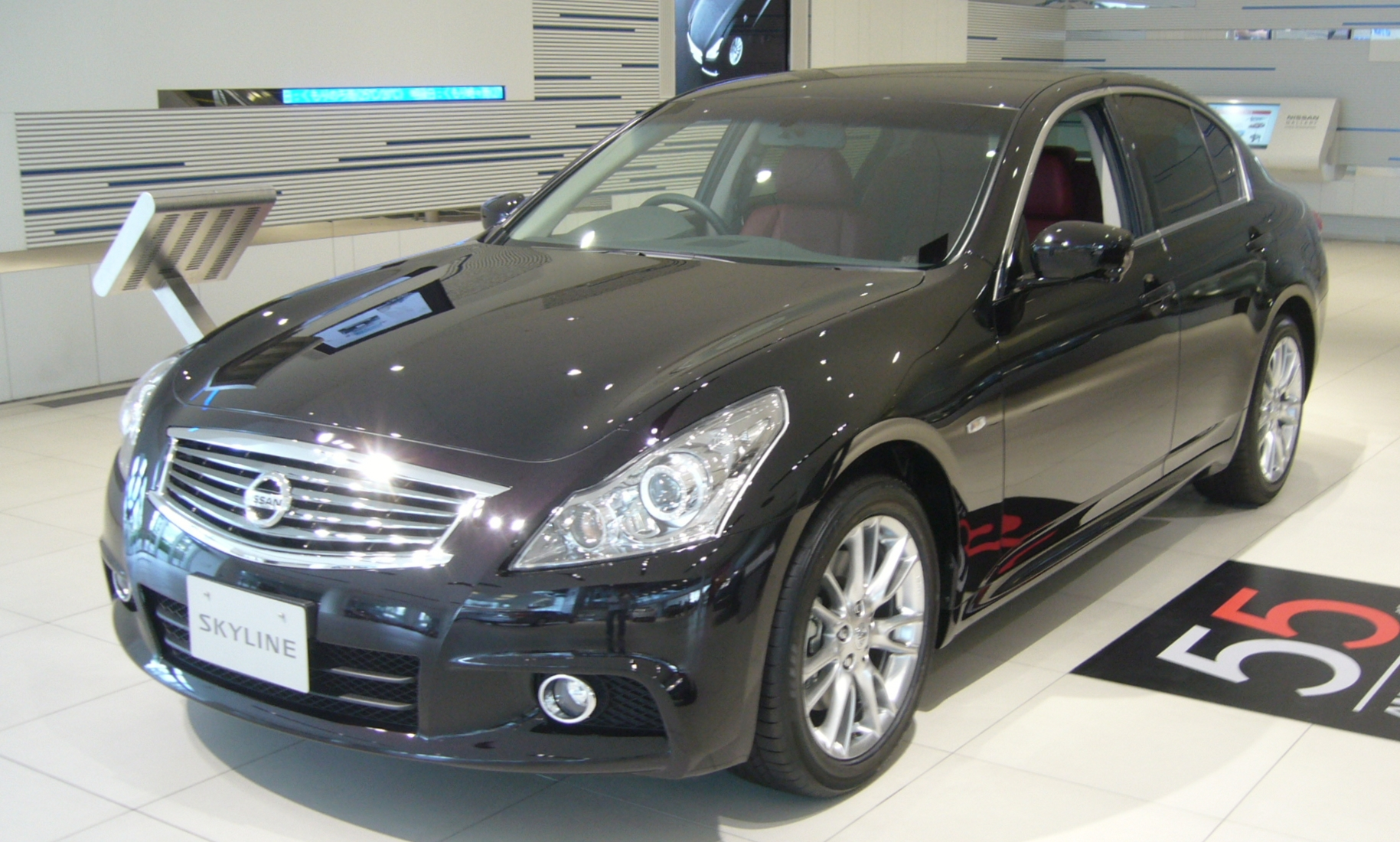
Nissan Skyline 55th Limited Edition

The sedan version of 55th Limited is a limited (555 units) edition of Skyline sedan, commemorating 55th anniversary of Nissan Skyline. Changes include anniversary edition red leather seats with front seat heater, 55th anniversary embroidering at front seats, black interior and garnet black (pearl) exterior.

Sedan version, covering the 250GT Type P, 250GT FOUR Type P, and 370GT Type SP, went on sale between 19 December 2011 and 30 April 2013 for ¥3,990,000, ¥4,221,000, and ¥4,515,000, respectively.

The Coupe version is a limited (55 units) edition of Skyline 370GT coupe, commemorating 55th anniversary of Nissan Skyline. Changes are the same as the 55th Limited Edition Skyline Sedan. Covering 370GT Type P and 370GT Type SP, the Coupe version went on sale between 10 February 2012 and 30 April 2013.

A customized version of Skyline Sedan (with high intensity LEDs and S-tune items, wide, low-center-of-gravity optional parts) was unveiled in the 2012 Tokyo Auto Salon.

=== 2013 Update ===
In November 2013, sales of all 370GT series grades was discontinued, and the lineup was consolidated into three 2.5 L grades ("250GT", "250GT Type S", and "250GT FOUR"), with additional equipment. This 2013 update also coincided with the announcement of the next generation model, the V37 Skyline.

==== Skyline Crossover (J50) ====
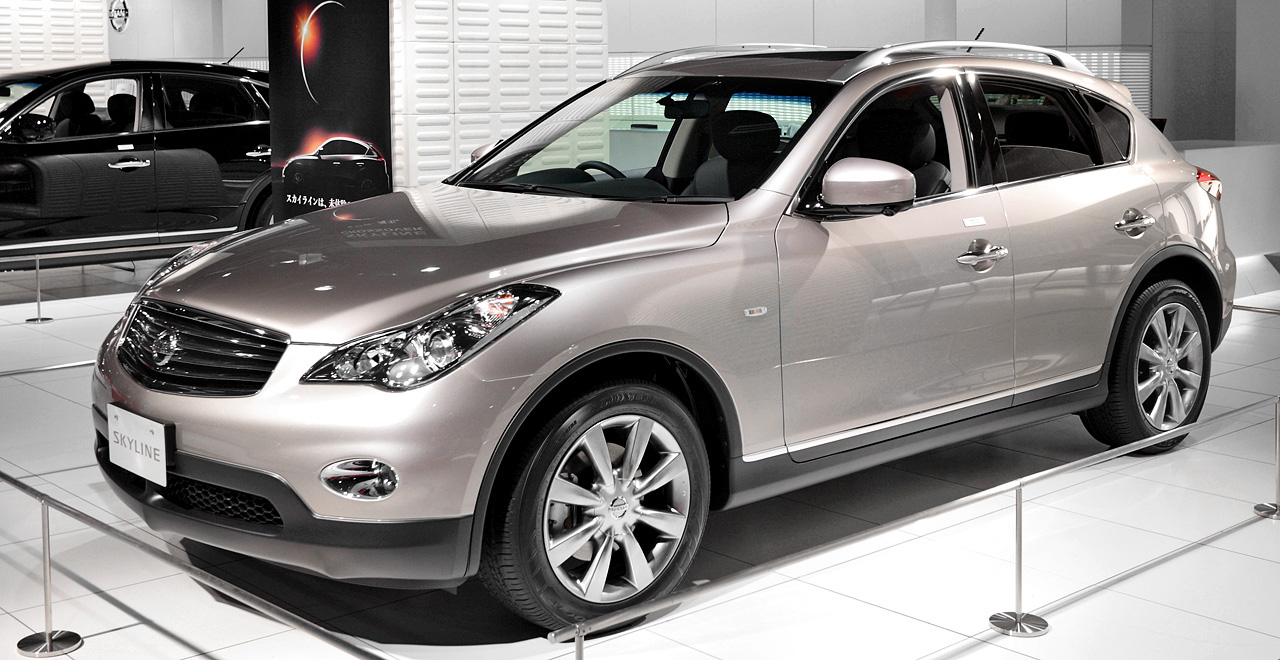
Nissan Skyline Crossover

Introduced in 16 April 2009, the Skyline Crossover is based on the Infiniti EX37, for Japan market. The vehicle was unveiled at Nissan Galleries nationwide beginning on 18 April 2009, and later with all seven body color variants at Nissan Galleries.

Sales of the Skyline Crossover began on 13 July 2009. It is offered in 2 variants: the 370GT (Type P) and 370GT FOUR (Type P). The Type P is the high-end grade and comes standard with features such as an around-view monitor, and an aero package including front, side sill, and rear under protectors can be selected as an option.

Four-wheel drive is standard on 370GT FOUR models. The 18-inch wheels are standard for all model ranges.

The Skyline Crossover was updated in October 2012. Changes include: intelligent cruise control, lane departure prevention, lane departure warning, forward collision warning, front seat emergency brake sensing pre-crash seat belt, intelligent brake assist, steering wheel switches (audio navigation, voice command, hands-free phone, intelligent cruise control, lane departure prevention) become standard equipment.

=== Technical specifications ===
==== Body styles ====
Chassis code	V36	CV36	J50
Body style	sedan	coupe	crossover
250GT	2010–2014	n/a	n/a
250GT FOUR	2010–2014	n/a	n/a
350GT	2006–2008	n/a	
370GT	2010–2014	2010–2016	2010–2014
370GT FOUR	n/a	n/a	2009–2016

==== Models ====
Model	Years	Engine Type/code	Power, torque@rpm	Drive
250GT sedan (DBA-V36)	2010–2014	2,495 cc (2.495 L; 152.3 cu in) V6 (VQ25HR)	225 PS (165 kW; 222 hp)@6400, 263 N⋅m (194 lb⋅ft)@4800	RWD
250GT FOUR sedan (DBA-NV36)	2010–2014	2,495 cc (2.495 L; 152.3 cu in) V6 (VQ25HR)	225 PS (165 kW; 222 hp)@6400, 263 N⋅m (194 lb⋅ft)@4800	AWD
350GT sedan (DBA-PV36)	2006–2008	3,498 cc (3.498 L; 213.5 cu in) V6 (VQ35HR)	315 PS (232 kW; 311 hp)@6800, 358 N⋅m (264 lb⋅ft)@4800	RWD
370GT coupe (DBA-CKV36)	2010–2014	3,696 cc (3.696 L; 225.5 cu in) V6 (VQ37VHR)	333 PS (245 kW; 328 hp)@7000, 363 N⋅m (268 lb⋅ft)@5200	RWD
370GT sedan (DBA-KV36)	2010–2014	3,696 cc (3.696 L; 225.5 cu in) V6 (VQ37VHR)	330 PS (243 kW; 325 hp)@7000, 361 N⋅m (266 lb⋅ft)@5200	RWD
370GT crossover (DBA-J50)	2009–2016	3,696 cc (3.696 L; 225.5 cu in) V6 (VQ37VHR)	330 PS (243 kW; 325 hp)@7000, 361 N⋅m (266 lb⋅ft)@5200	RWD
370GT FOUR crossover (DBA-NJ50)	2009–2016	3,696 cc (3.696 L; 225.5 cu in) V6 (VQ37VHR)	330 PS (243 kW; 325 hp)@7000, 361 N⋅m (266 lb⋅ft)@5200	AWD

==== Transmissions ====
Model	Years	Standard	Optional
250GT sedan	2006–2010 2010–2014	5-speed automatic 7-speed automatic	—
250GT FOUR sedan	2010–2014	5-speed automatic	—
350GT sedan	2006–2008	5-speed automatic	—
370GT coupe	2010–2016	7-speed automatic	6-speed manual (Type S, Type SP)
370GT sedan	2010–2014	7-speed automatic	—
370GT crossover	2009–2016	7-speed automatic	—
370GT FOUR crossover	2009–2016	7-speed automatic	—

=== Marketing ===
Nissan Motor Co., Ltd. and Minami Kanto Regional Office, Japan Post Network Co., Ltd. announced the sales of original frame stamps titled History of Cars "Nissan (Skyline)" (5000 units) and History of Cars "Nissan (Electric Vehicles)" (1000 units). The designs of these original frame stamps are based on Nissan's successive Skylines and electric vehicles. The frame stamps went on sale from 1 February to 31 August 2010.

King Records published the Nissan Skyline CM collection, featuring a compilation of Nissan Skyline commercials. As part of the 55th anniversary of the Nissan Skyline, a draw of 500 Skyline meets Eizin Suzuki 2013 calendars were distributed in December 2012.

== Thirteenth generation (V37; 2014) ==
Thirteenth generation
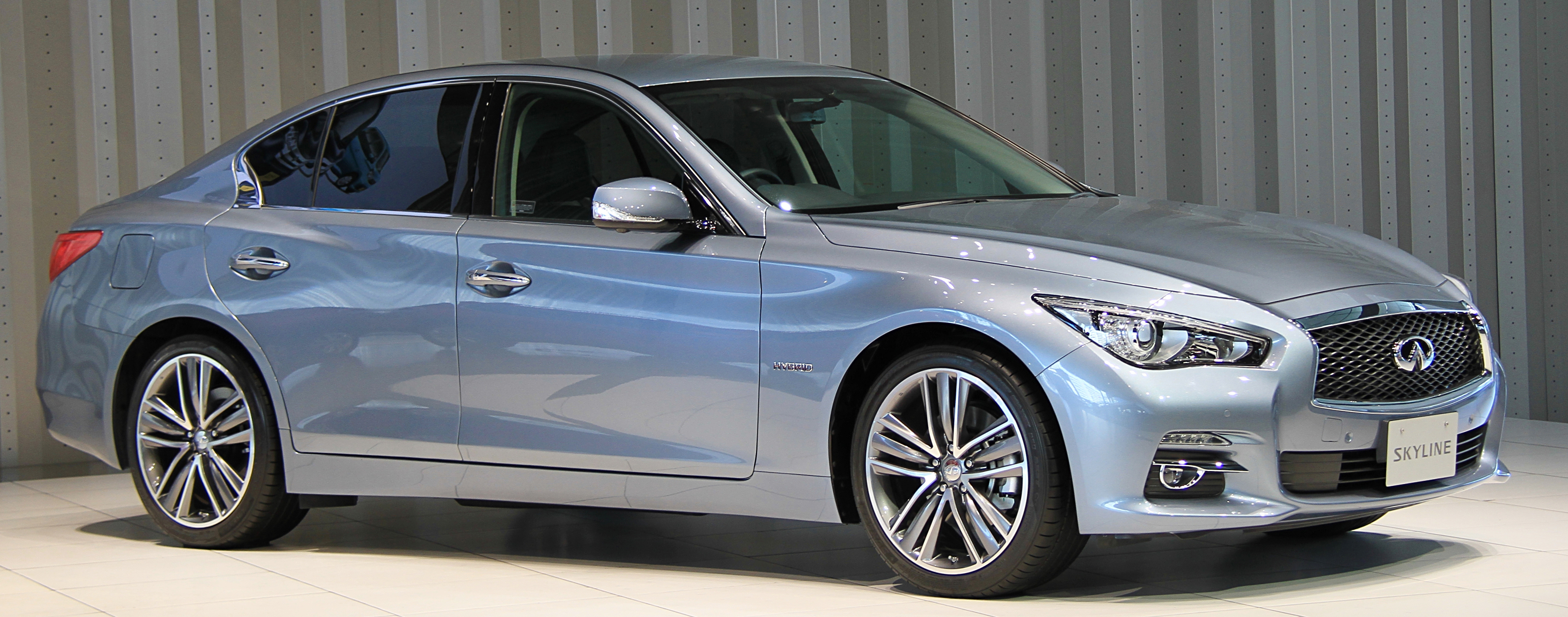
- 2014–2017 Nissan Skyline 350GT Type P (V37, Japan)

Overview
- Model code: V37
- Also called: Infiniti Q50 (2014–2024)
- Production: February 2014 – 2022 (hybrid); May 2014 – present (gasoline)
- Assembly: Japan: Kaminokawa, Tochigi
- Designer: Joel Baek, Hirohisa Ono and Koichi Ishizuka (pre-facelift)

Body and chassis
- Body style: 4-door sedan
- Layout: Front-engine, rear-wheel-drive; Front-engine, four-wheel-drive (3.5 L models only)
- Platform: Nissan FM platform
- Related: Infiniti Q60; Nissan Fairlady Z Z34

Powertrain
- Engine: Gasoline: 2.0 L Mercedes-Benz M274 I4 (2014–2019); 3.0 L VR30DDTT twin turbo V6 (2019–present); Gasoline hybrid: 3.5 L VQ35HR hybrid V6 (until 2022)
- Electric motor: HM34 (3.5 L models only)
- Power output: 155 kW (208 hp; 211 PS) (M274); 224–309 kW (300–414 hp; 305–420 PS) (VR30DDTT); 225 kW (302 hp; 306 PS) (VQ35HR)
- Transmission: 7-speed automatic
- Hybrid drivetrain: Intelligent Dual Clutch Control
- Battery: 1.4 kWh Li-ion

Dimensions
- Wheelbase: 2,850 mm (112.2 in)
- Length: 4,790–4,800 mm (188.6–189.0 in) (2014–2017); 4,815 mm (189.6 in) (2017–2019); 4,810 mm (189.4 in) (2019–present)
- Width: 1,820 mm (71.7 in)
- Height: 1,440 mm (56.7 in) (RWD); 1,450 mm (57.1 in) (AWD)
- Curb weight: 1,650–1,690 kg (3,637.6–3,725.8 lb) (2.0 L models); 1,700–1,760 kg (3,747.9–3,880.1 lb) (3.0 L models); 1,760–1,810 kg (3,880.1–3,990.4 lb) (3.5 L RWD models); 1,840–1,910 kg (4,056.5–4,210.8 lb) (3.5 L AWD models)

The thirteenth-generation was unveiled in November 2013. The thirteenth-generation Skyline was identical to the Infiniti Q50 sedan, aside from rear badging and minor trim differences. Until 2019, it retains the Infiniti badges from the Q50. One major changes was the debut of an electric-gasoline hybrid powertrain in the range and the revival of four-cylinder engines and turbocharged models.

In a major departure from previous generations, the V37 Skyline is only available as a four-door sedan. However, the US market received a coupé based on the V37 Skyline as the Infiniti Q60 in August 2016. The Skyline Coupe is not offered due to declining sales.

Japan models went on sale in February 2014. Early models include 350GT Hybrid, 350GT Hybrid Type P, 350GT Hybrid Type SP, 350GT Four Hybrid, 350GT Four Hybrid Type P, 350GT Four Hybrid Type SP. The 200GT-t, 200GT-t Type P, 200GT-t Type SP went on sale on 5 May 2014 through Nissan dealers.

Beginning with 18 April 2016, 350GT Hybrid, 350GT Four Hybrid, 200GT-t models include all-direction support system in the emergency brake.

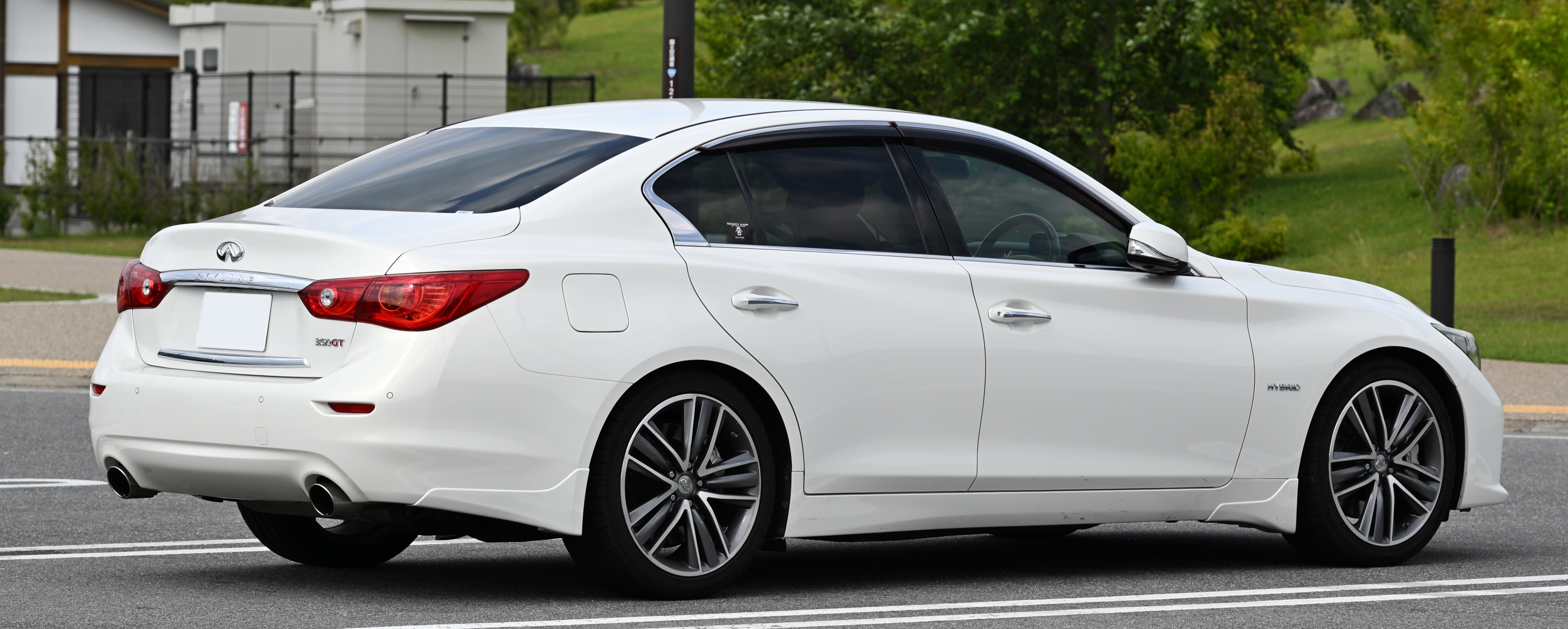
Skyline 350GT Hybrid rear view

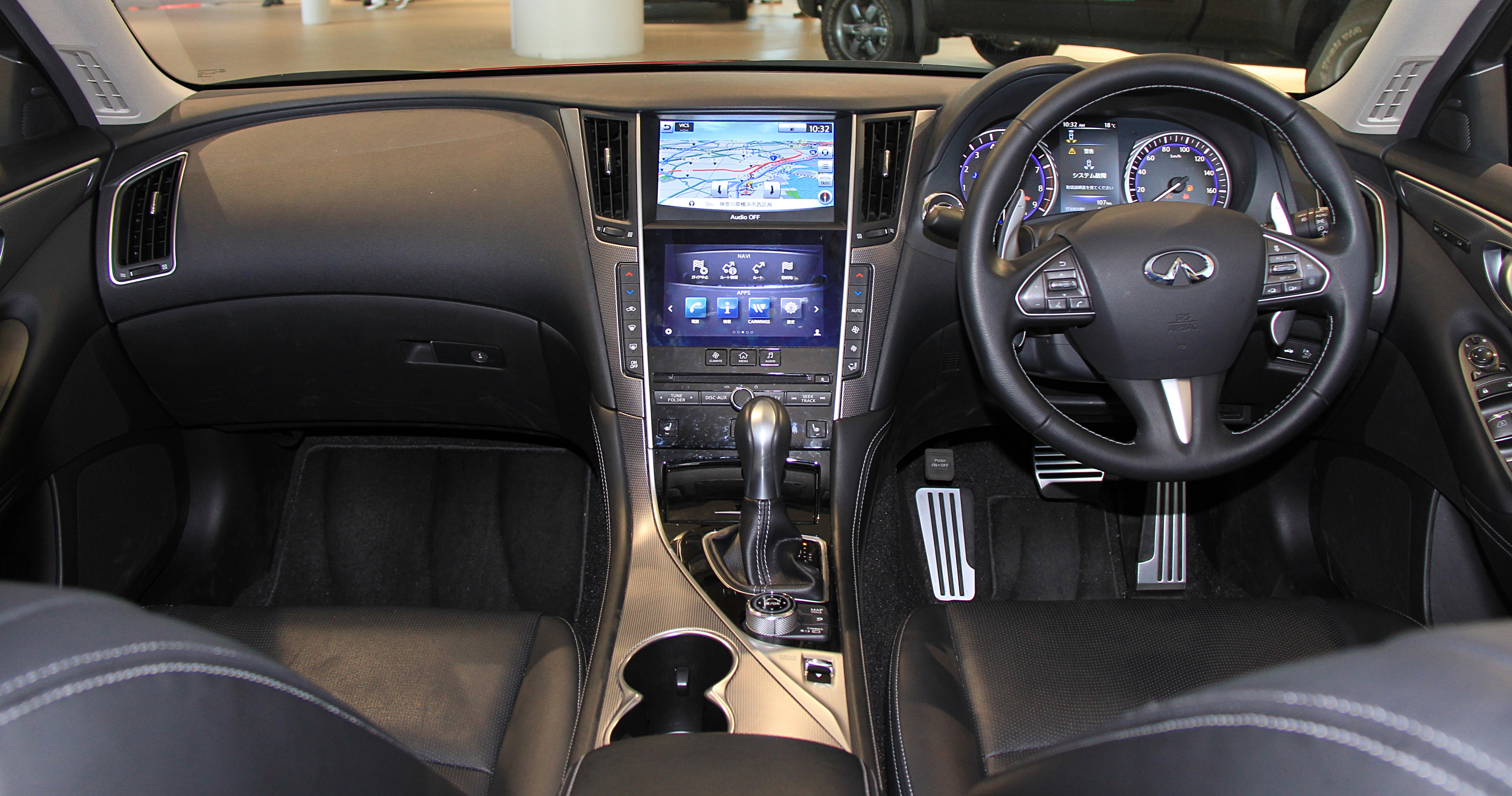
Interior

=== Skyline Cool Exclusive (2015–2016) ===
The Skyline Cool Exclusive went on sale on 21 December 2015 in Japan. Based on Skyline sedan models 200GT-t Type P, 200GT-t Type SP, 350GT Hybrid Type P, 350GT Hybrid Type SP, 350GT Four Hybrid Type P, and 350GT Four Hybrid Type SP, it included Stone White high contrast interior (Stone White leather seats, Cool Exclusive door trim in high contrast color, Cool Exclusive console lid in Stone White), aluminum finisher, Midnight Black grille and a BOSE audio system.

=== Skyline 60th Limited (2016–2017) ===
The Skyline 60th Limited is a version of Skyline sedan commemorating the 60th anniversary of the Nissan Skyline. Japan models went on sale on 7 November 2016. Available for models 200GT-t Type SP, 350GT Hybrid Type SP, 350GT Four Hybrid Type SP, it included semi-aniline leather upholstery in all seats, an optional BOSE Performance Series sound system (new tweeters at rear doors, 16 speakers, new front door tweeter) and an aurora flare blue pearl (2-coat pearl) body color option for a total of 9 color choices.

=== 2017 update ===
The 2017 update went on sale on 20 December 2017 in Japan. Changes include redesigned bumper for Type SP, Type P, 350 GT Hybrid models, 9 body colors (including Imperial Amber), new standard Cutting brilliant 19-inch aluminum wheel for Type SP and 18-inch aluminum wheel with chrome color coat for Type P models, reduced size of the horn pad, stitches added to the instrument panel, ring lighting of the analog meter is changed to gray and new Ambient Light System option.

=== 2019 update ===
The 2019 update went on sale on 16 July 2019 in Japan. Changes include redesigned front fascia to be more similar to the R35 GT-R, reuse of Nissan logo emblems, rounded taillamps akin to older Skyline models, addition of 3.0 L VR30DDTT twin turbo V6 engine option and discontinuation of Mercedes-Benz 274930 engine option, and introduction of ProPilot 2.0 safety system. This update also reintroduced the "400R" moniker, which is equivalent to the US market Q50 Red Sport 400 grade. The 400R grade has a power output of 405 PS (298 kW; 399 hp) from its VR30DDTT engine.

On 16 May 2022, production of the Skyline Hybrid was discontinued.

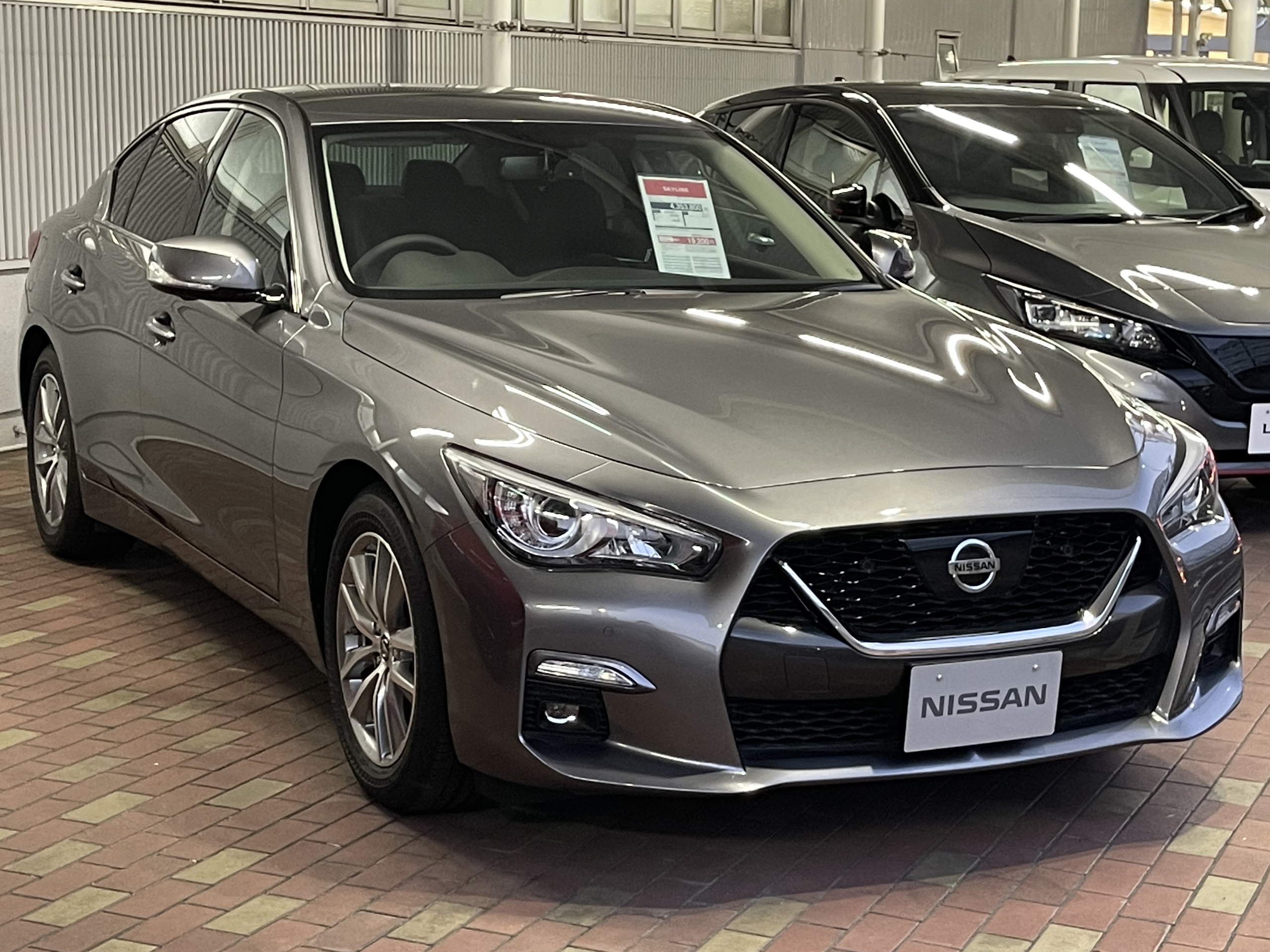
Nissan Skyline GT (RV37, Japan)

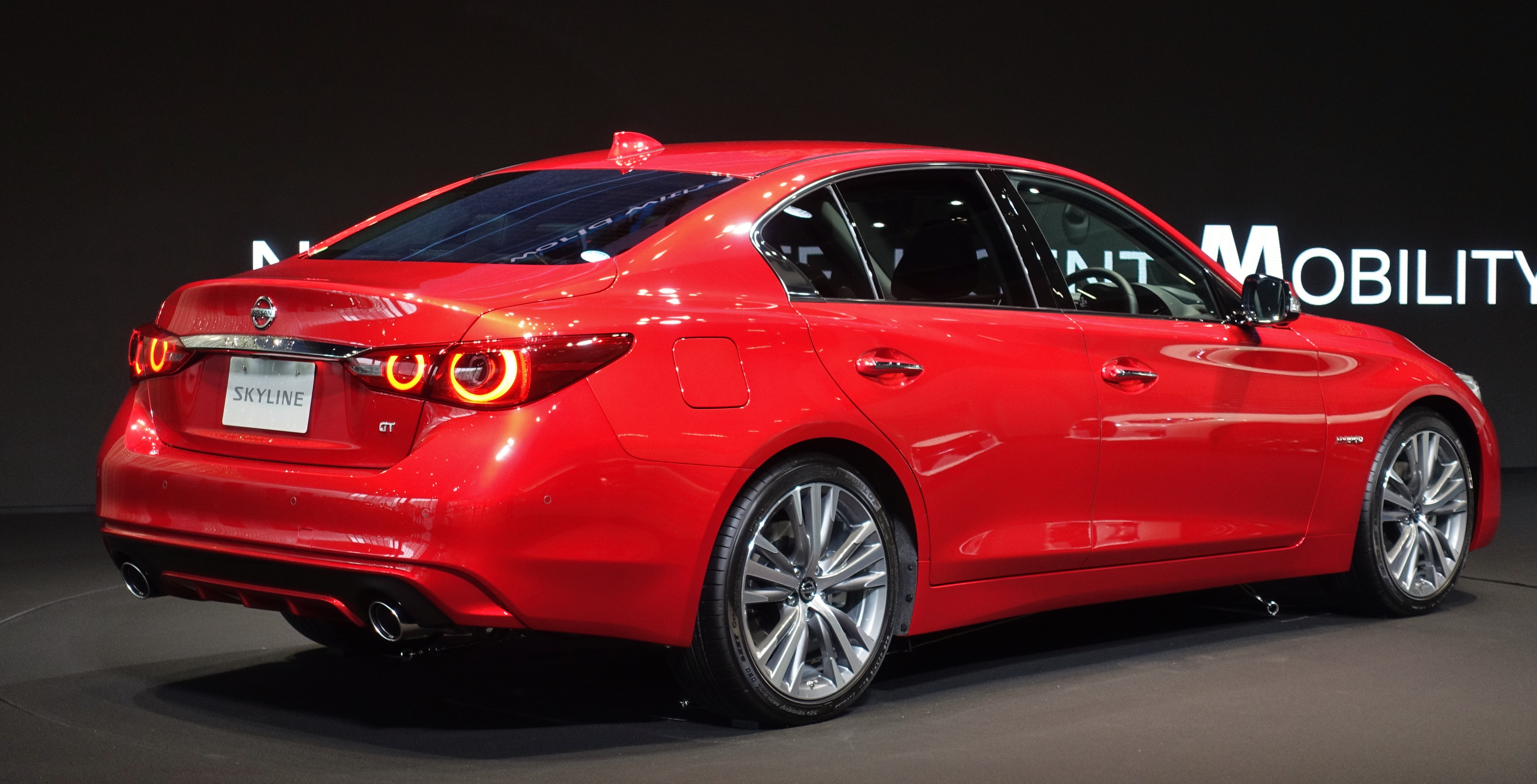
2019 Nissan Skyline Hybrid GT Type SP (HV37, Japan)

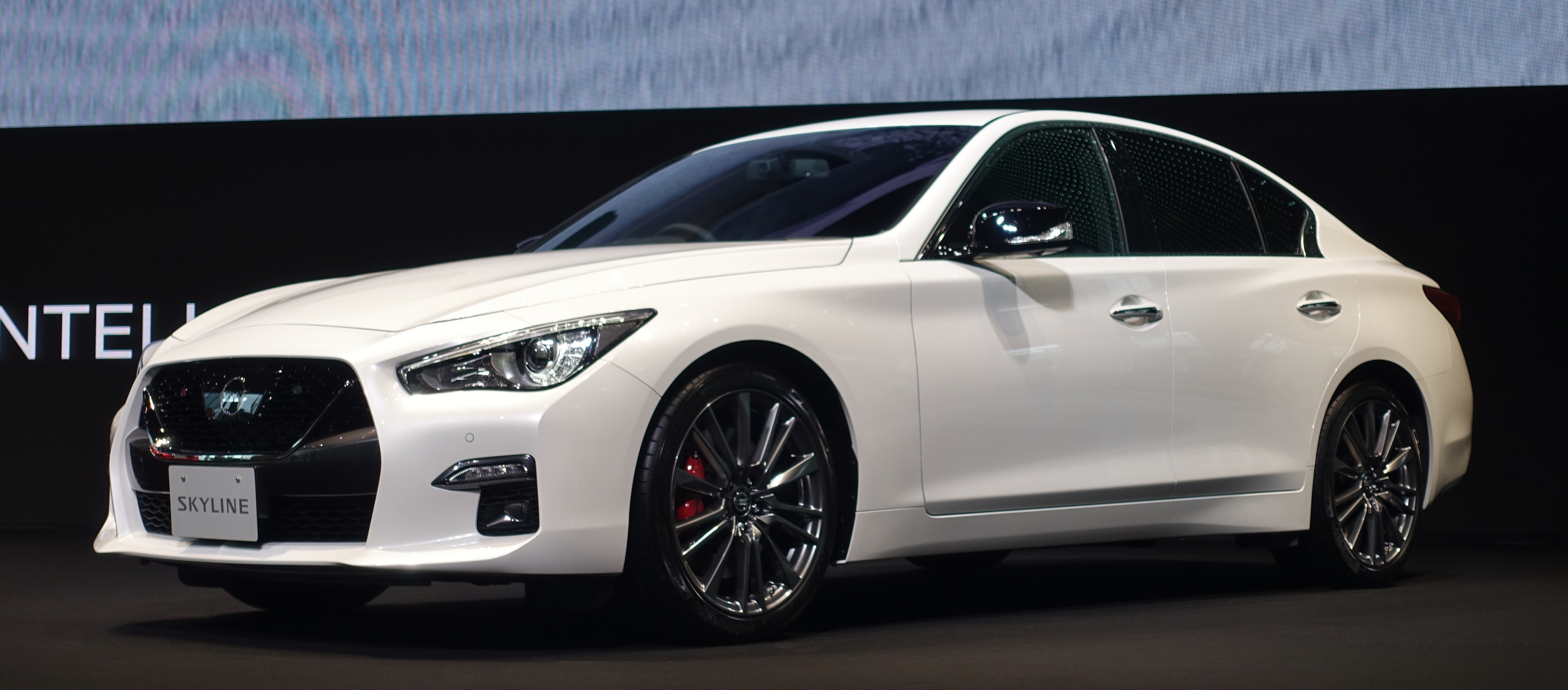
2019 Nissan Skyline 400R (RV37, Japan)

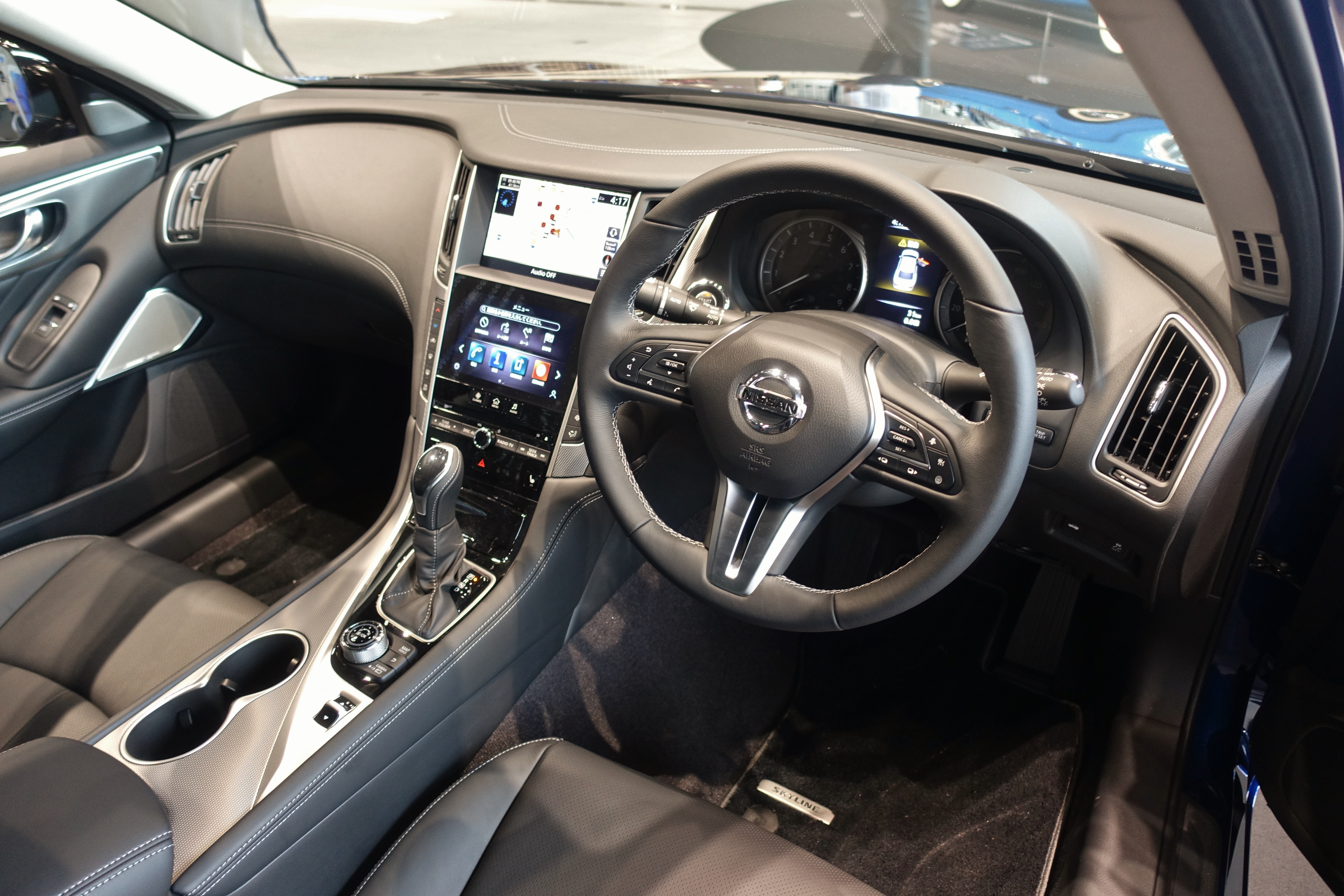
2019 Interior

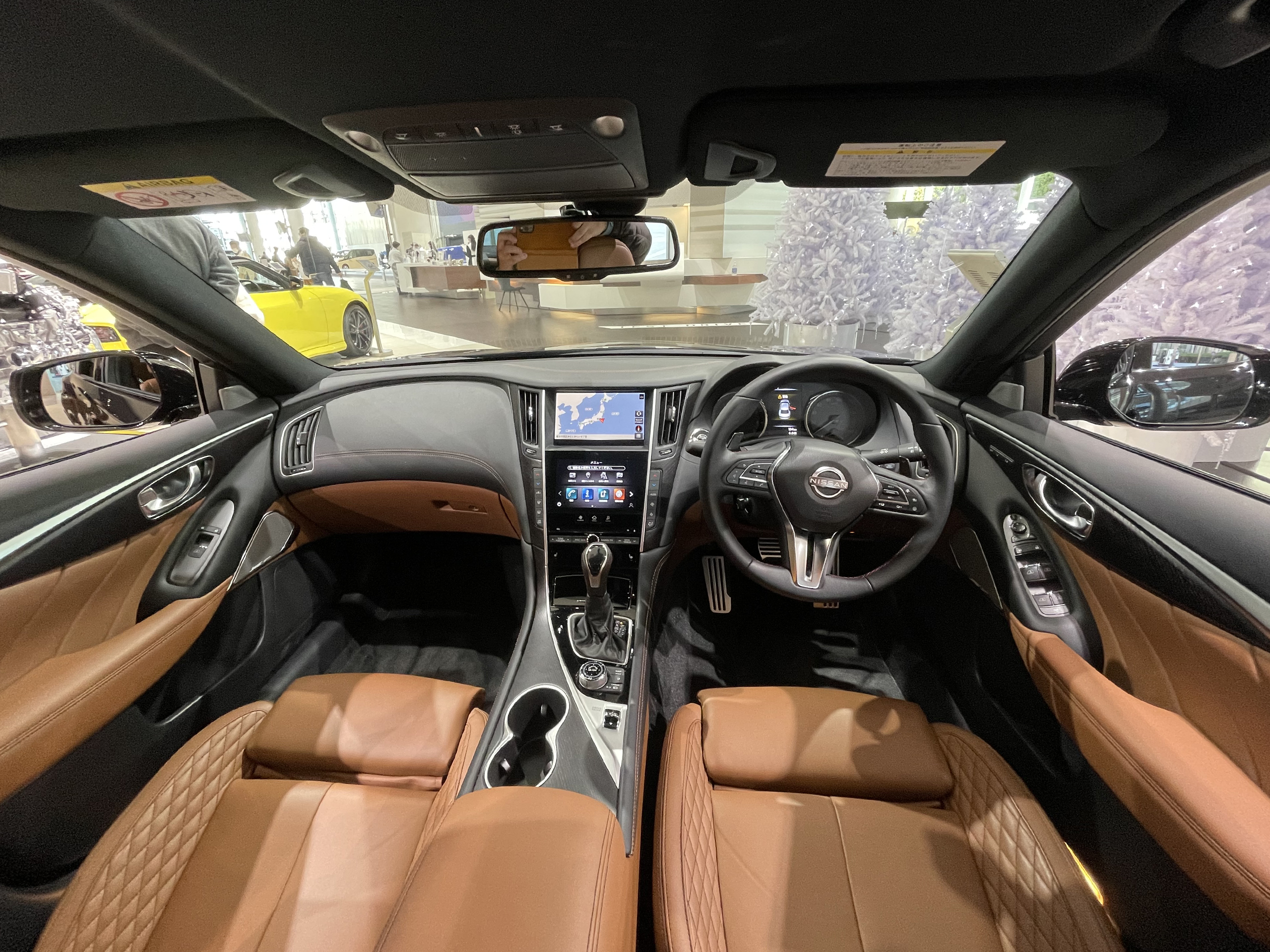
2022 Interior

=== Skyline Nismo (2023) ===
The Skyline Nismo and Skyline Nismo Limited were unveiled on 8 August 2023. The Nismo version is limited to 1,000 units, while the Nismo Limited is limited to 100 units. These two versions were on sale in early September in Japanese market. It uses the same engine as 400R but tuned by the engineers involved in the development of the GT500 racing class engine. The engines of the 100 Limited were handbulit by the legendary "Takumi", that already built the VR38 engine of the R35 GT-R and so their name-plates are on those engines.

The Nismo model was availible with leather seats, with optional Nismo Recaro seats and carbon interior package. The Nismo Limited got the seats and carbon by default. For the Nismo model five colors were availible: Sealth Grey (around 500 cars), Brilliant White (around 300 cars), Black, Dark Metal Gray and Carmine Red (remaining around 200 cars). The Limited was only availible in Sealth Grey, Brilliant White and Dark Metal Grey. Numbers are not known.

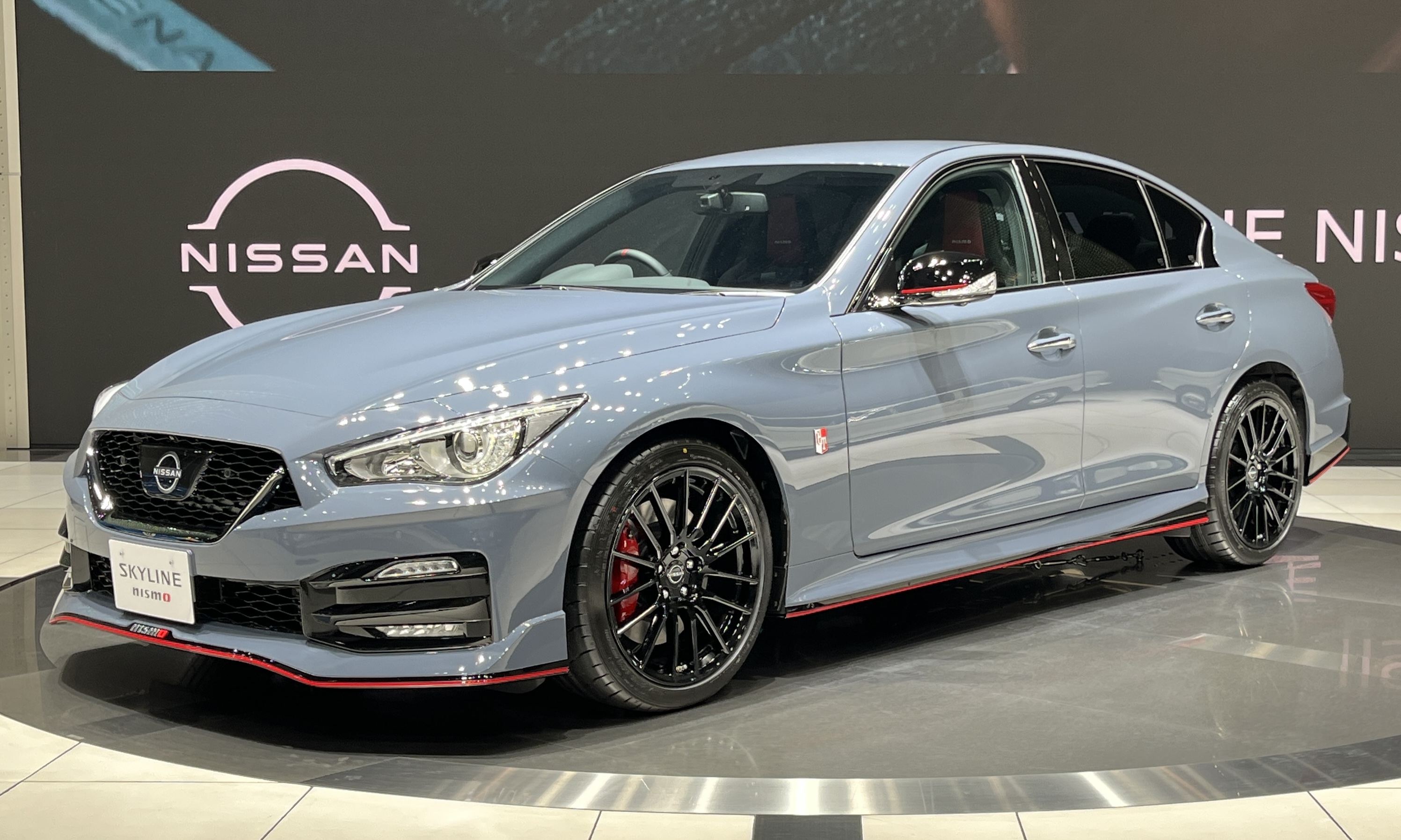
Nissan Skyline Nismo (RV37, Japan)

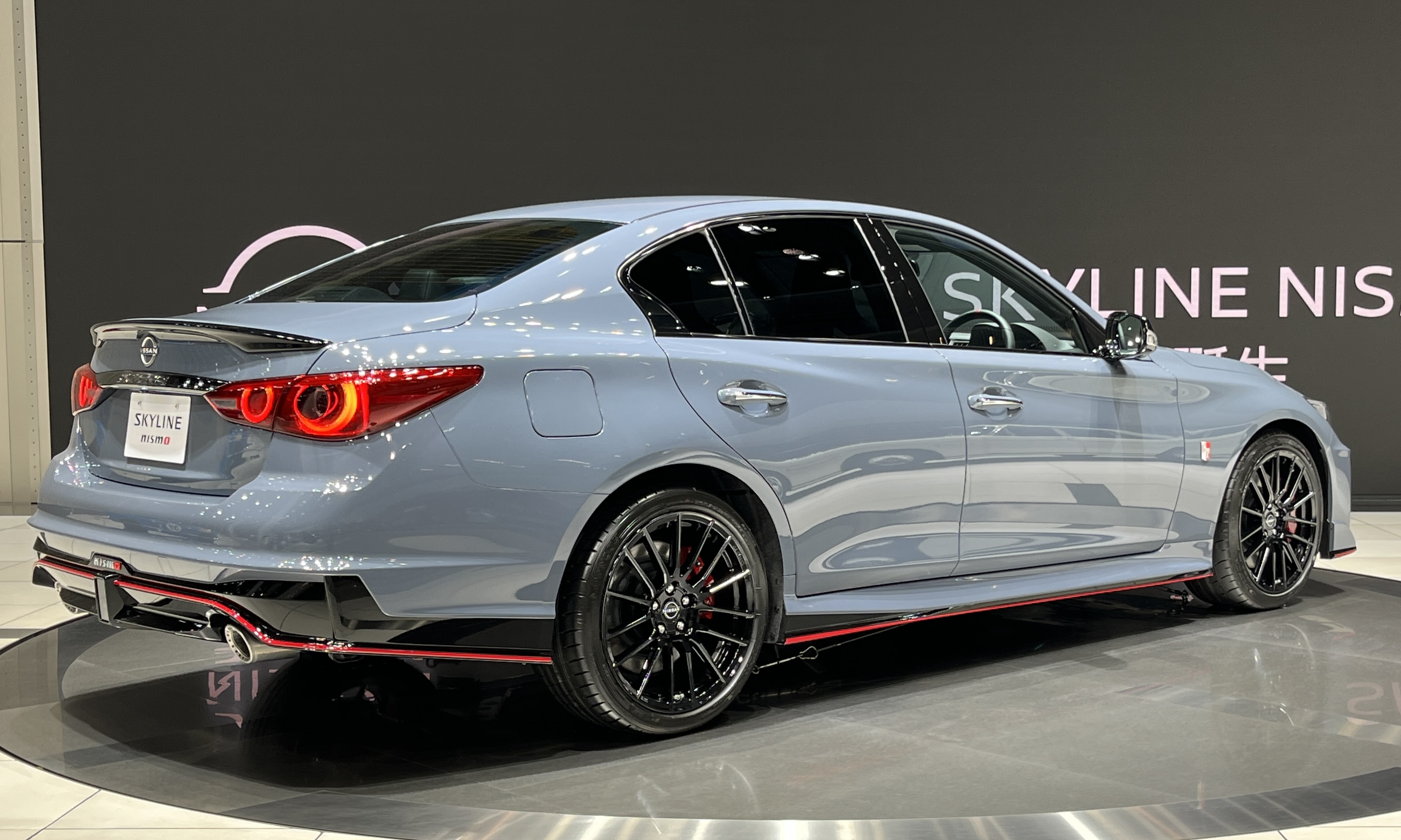
Nissan Skyline Nismo (RV37, Japan)

=== Body styles ===
Chassis code	HV37/ZV37/RV37
Body style	Sedan
200GT-t	2014–2019
350GT Hybrid	2014–
350GT Four Hybrid	2014–
GT	2019–
400R	2019–
Nismo	2023–

=== Engines ===
Gasoline engines
Model	Years	Engine Type/code	Power, torque@rpm
200GT-t DBA-ZV37	2014–2019	1,991 cc (121 cu in) I4 turbo (Mercedes-Benz 274930)	211 PS (155 kW; 208 hp)@5500, 350 N⋅m (258 lb⋅ft)@1250–3500
200GT-t DBA-YV37	2016–2019	1,991 cc (121 cu in) I4 turbo (Mercedes-Benz 274A)	211 PS (155 kW; 208 hp)@5500, 350 N⋅m (258 lb⋅ft)@1250–3500
GT 5BA-RV37	2019–	2,997 cc (183 cu in) V6 twin turbo (VR30DDTT)	304 PS (224 kW; 300 hp)@6400, 400 N⋅m (295 lb⋅ft)@1600–5200
400R 5BA-RV37	2019–	2,997 cc (183 cu in) V6 twin turbo (VR30DDTT)	405 PS (298 kW; 399 hp)@6400, 475 N⋅m (350 lb⋅ft)@1600–5200
Nismo 5BA-RV37	2023–	2,997 cc (183 cu in) V6 twin turbo (VR30DDTT)	420 PS (309 kW; 414 hp)@6400, 550 N⋅m (406 lb⋅ft)@1600–5200
350GT Hybrid DAA-HV37	2014–	3,498 cc (213 cu in) V6 (Nissan VQ35HR)	306 PS (225 kW; 302 hp)@6800, 350 N⋅m (258 lb⋅ft)@5000
350GT Hybrid DAA-HV37	2014–	electric motor (Nissan HM34)	68 PS (50 kW; 67 hp)@1650-2000, 290 N⋅m (214 lb⋅ft)@1650
350GT Hybrid DAA-HV37	2014–	combined	364 PS (268 kW; 359 hp)@?, 546 N⋅m (403 lb⋅ft)@?
350GT Four Hybrid DAA-HNV37	2014–	3,498 cc (213 cu in) V6 (Nissan VQ35HR)	306 PS (225 kW; 302 hp)@6800, 350 N⋅m (258 lb⋅ft)@5000
350GT Four Hybrid DAA-HNV37	2014–	electric motor (Nissan HM34)	68 PS (50 kW; 67 hp)@1650–2000, 290 N⋅m (214 lb⋅ft)@1650
350GT Four Hybrid DAA-HNV37	2014–	combined	364 PS (268 kW; 359 hp)@?, 546 N⋅m (403 lb⋅ft)@?

350GT Four Hybrid models include ATTESA-ETS four-wheel-drive system.

=== Transmissions ===
Model	Years	Types
200GT-t	2014–2019	7-speed automatic with manual mode (7G-TRONIC PLUS)
200GT-t	2016–2019	7-speed automatic with manual mode (7M-ATx)
350GT Hybrid	2014–	7-speed automatic with manual mode
350GT Four Hybrid	2014–	7-speed automatic with manual mode
GT	2019–	7-speed automatic with manual mode (7M-ATx)
400R	2019–	7-speed automatic with manual mode (7M-ATx)
Nismo	2023–	7-speed automatic with manual mode (7M-ATx)

=== Production ===
Skyline sedan was built in Tochigi Plant (Kaminokawa-machi, Kawachi-gun, Tochigi prefecture).

The turbocharged engine and automatic transmission used by Skyline 200GT-t sedan were built by Daimler.

11,673 Skyline sedans were recalled due to faulty direct adaptive steering program leading to steering wheel fail to return to neutral position, which can be triggered by steering a parked vehicle when starting engine.

=== Marketing ===
The Skyline sedan was targeted towards males over the age of 40. Also, Nissan branding was not used on this generation of the Skyline before the facelift; therefore, it is neither referred to as a Nissan or an Infiniti, but simply "Skyline."

On 6 August 2015 and 1 March 2016, Japan Post released a personalized stamp set based on Nissan Skyline 2000GT-R (Type KPGC10), including 10 stamps and a model car for the featured vehicle.

On 16 June 2017, Japan Post released Skyline 60th Anniversary original goods collection for catalogue, and Skyline 60th anniversary original goods for net shop. The catalogue collection includes pin badge set, Skyline 60th Anniversary and Nissan Skyline 2000GT (GC10) posters, set of 6 tumbler cups in RB26 engine-theme case, Skyline round table lamp with 8 plates, Duralumin card cases in Skyline 60th Anniversary and Skyline Hardtop 2000 Turbo RS stylings, Artket cloth/cushion in Skyline 60th Anniversary and Skyline 2000GT-R (KPGC110) designs. Net shop items include Skyline 60th Anniversary pure gold plaque with ALSI Skyline deluxe made by Ginza Tanaka, 1/6th scale GT-R S20 engine model.

== Fourteenth generation (V38; Upcoming) ==
The fourteenth-generation Skyline was officially teased on 14 April 2026. On the same day, Nissan's official YouTube channel released a teaser video featuring the silhouette of a C10 Skyline racing against a new generation of the Skyline. The video also confirmed that this generation would once again feature four round taillights used in previous Skyline models. According to Nissan, by utilizing generative artificial intelligence and digital simulation tools in design and manufacturing process, the model's development time has been cut to 26 months, down from its predecessor's time of 55 months. Nissan has confirmed that it will debut in December 2026. It will initially launch only in Japan .
