= Prince Sedan =

Prince Sedan AISH/AMSH
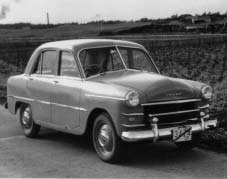
- 1952 Prince Sedan AISH-I

Overview
- Manufacturer: Prince Motor Company
- Production: 1952-1957
- Assembly: Mitaka, Japan
- Designer: Takuya Himura

Body and chassis
- Body style: 4-door sedan
- Layout: FR layout

Chronology
- Predecessor: Tama Senior EMS-49-III (Electric vehicle)
- Successor: Prince Skyline

The Prince Sedan was a Japanese compact executive car made from 1952 until 1957 by the Tama Motor Company (renamed the Prince Motor Company in November 1952), which was one of the successors of the Tachikawa Aircraft Company. It was replaced by the first generation Prince Skyline ALSI in 1957.

The Prince Sedan AISH had live axles in front and the back.

In March 1956, the Prince Sedan Special AMSH was added to the line-up. It had a double wishbone suspension in front.

== Background ==
The Tama Electric Car Company was producing several kinds of electric vehicles. Before the Korean War, the supply of gasoline was controlled by the GHQ and was expensive. In June 1950, the Korean War broke out. The price of batteries became extremely high (approximately ten times). On the other hand, the price of gasoline became cheaper. Tama Electric Car could not continue to produce electric vehicles.

In September 1950, they decided to produce new gasoline vehicles instead of electric vehicles. In November 1950, they officially ordered the Fuji Precision Industries, one of the successors of disbanded Nakajima Aircraft Company, to design and produce a new gasoline engine for Tama.

Tama finally stopped building electric vehicles in September 1951. In the next month, Fuji Precision completed the new gasoline engine named FG4A. This engine was based on the engine of the Peugeot 202 which was owned by Shojiro Ishibashi, the Bridgestone founder and the owner of the Tama Motors and the Fuji Precision.

This engine (later renamed as G-1) was improved and modified gradually and was used until 1968 for the basic version of Prince Skyline S50, and was shared with the Subaru 1500 the first Subaru manufactured. (The upper version S57 used the new G15 SOHC engine in 1967 and 1968.) Around ten people belonged to Tama's development team headed by the design manager Jiro Tanaka. His assistant manager Takuya Himura, who would become the direct boss of Shinichiro Sakurai in October 1952, was in charge of the development of the Prince Sedan and other vehicles.

== AISH-1 ==
AISH-1
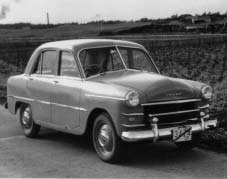

Overview
- Production: 1952-1953

Body and chassis
- Related: Prince AFTF Truck

Powertrain
- Engine: 1.5L FG4A-10 I4
- Transmission: 4-speed manual

Dimensions
- Wheelbase: 2,460 mm (96.9 in)
- Length: 4,290 mm (168.9 in)
- Width: 1,588 mm (62.5 in)
- Height: 1,590 mm (62.6 in)
- Curb weight: 1,116 kg (2,460 lb)

In 1952 the AISH-1 was introduced. An evolution of the previous Tama Senior sedan, the front end resembled Russian cars of the era and the side had a European look. The engine was the new 45 hp (46 PS; 34 kW) 1.5L FG4A-10, an enlarged and modified version of the Peugeot 202 engine. There was also a truck version based on the AISH-1, the AFTF-1, which was also available in double cab and van versions. The AISH-1 was in production until June 1953, when it was replaced by the AISH-2.

== AISH-2 ==
AISH-2
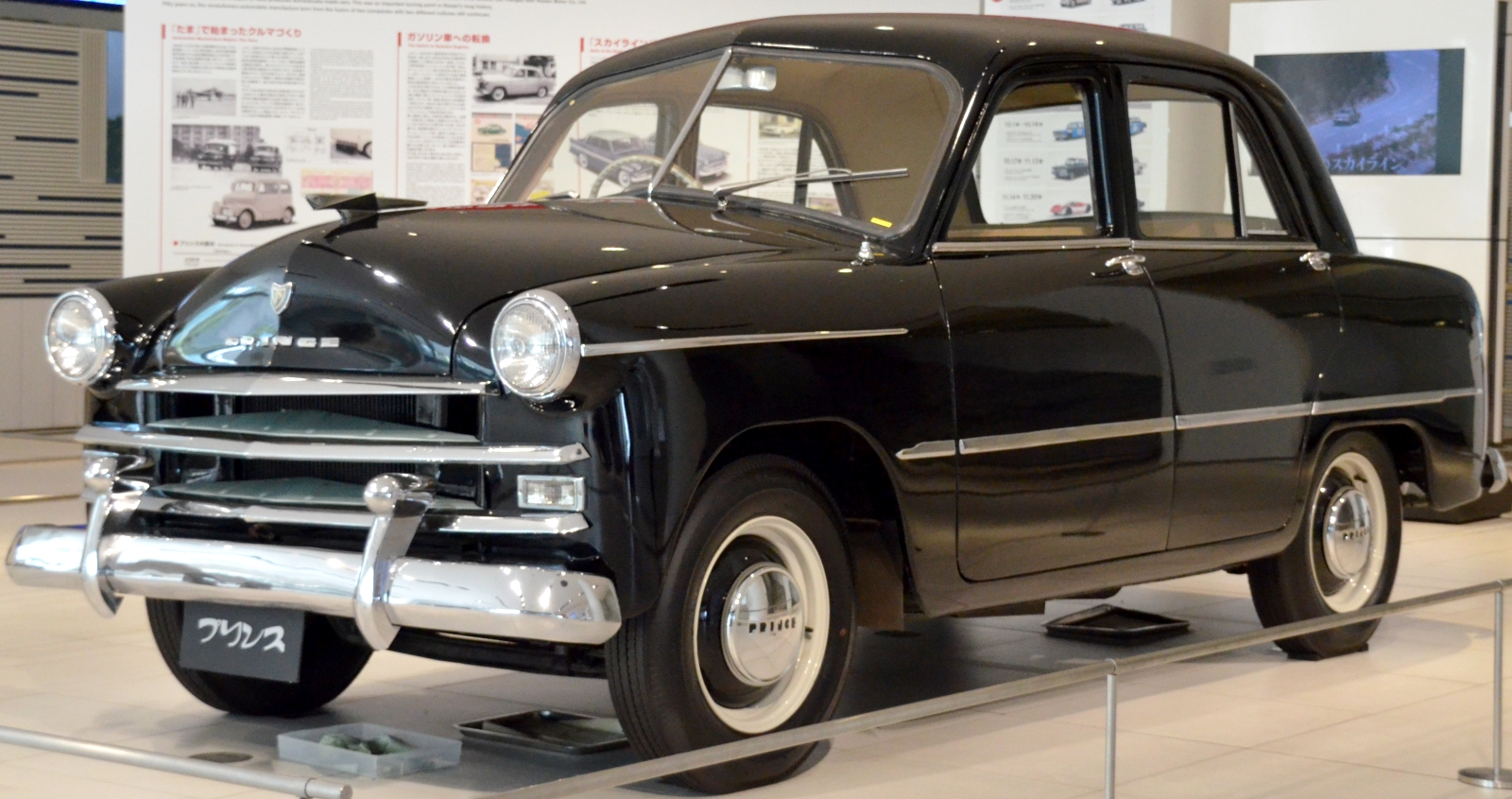
- 1954 Prince Sedan AISH-2 (Crown Prince Akihito's vehicle)

Overview
- Production: 1953-1955

Body and chassis
- Related: Prince AFTF Truck

Powertrain
- Engine: 1.5L FG4A-10 I4
- Transmission: 4-speed manual

Dimensions
- Wheelbase: 2,460 mm (96.9 in)
- Length: 4,290 mm (168.9 in)
- Width: 1,655 mm (65.2 in)
- Height: 1,633 mm (64.3 in)
- Curb weight: 1,254 kg (2,765 lb)

The AISH-2 was released in 1953 and was in production until November 1954. Although the styling was nearly identical to the previous model, the AISH-2 was both wider and slightly taller, thanks to changes in legislature in Japan in late 1952 that allowed the production of slightly larger passenger cars. The only other change was to the wheels, which were changed from 16 inches on the AISH-1 to more modern 15-inch ones. The engine and transmission were carried over unchanged from the previous model.

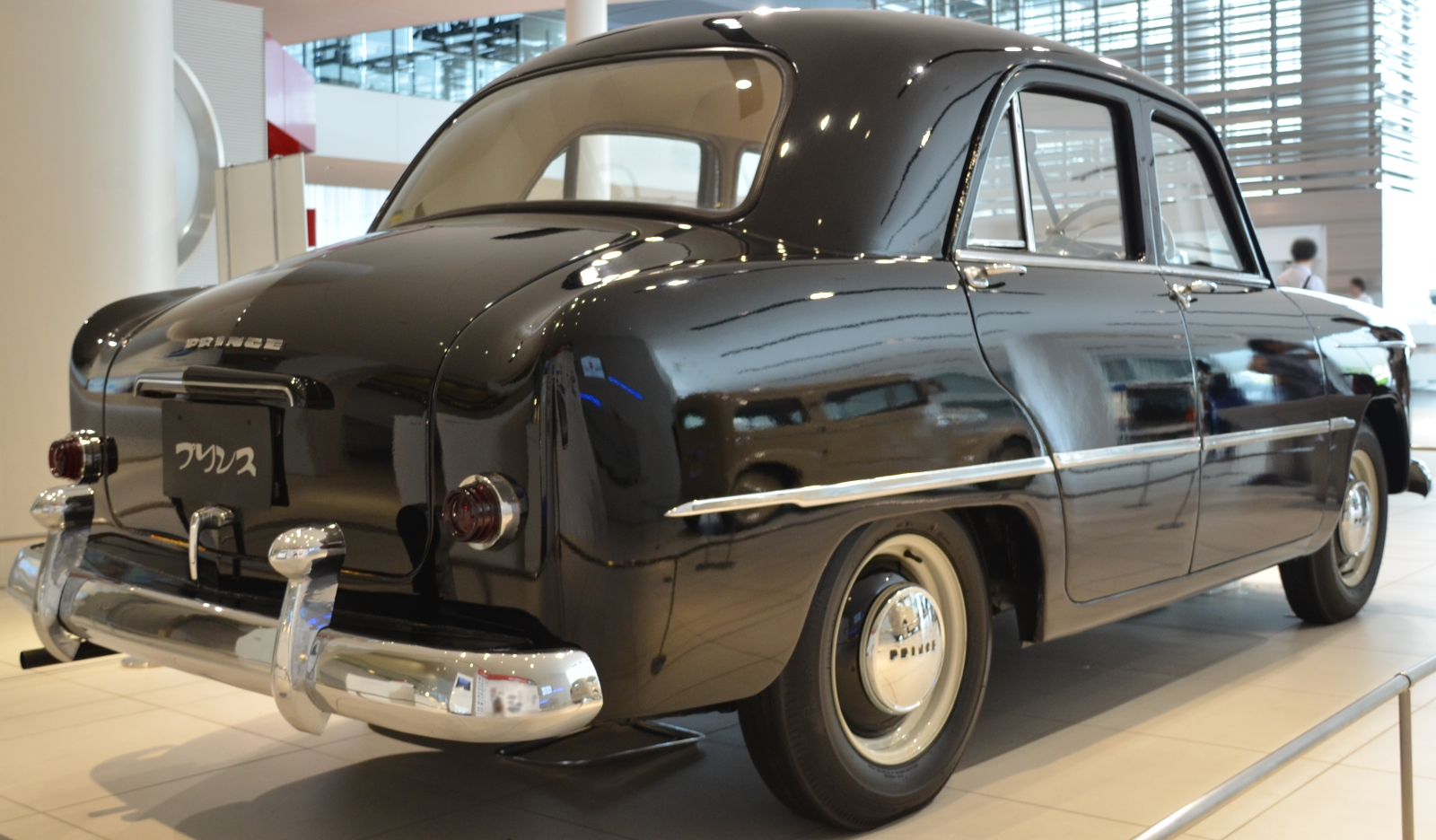
Rear view of Prince Sedan AISH-2

== AISH-3 ==
AISH-3

Overview
- Production: 1955

Body and chassis
- Related: Prince AFTF Truck

Powertrain
- Engine: 1.5L FG4A-10 I4
- Transmission: 4-speed manual

Dimensions
- Wheelbase: 2,460 mm (96.9 in)
- Length: 4,290 mm (168.9 in)
- Width: 1,655 mm (65.2 in)
- Height: 1,633 mm (64.3 in)
- Curb weight: 1,254 kg (2,765 lb)

The AISH-3 was released in November 1954. The changes to the AISH-3 were cosmetic, with a new grille design as well as a new side strip design. Engine and transmission remained the same. The AISH-3 was short-lived as it was replaced by the AISH-4 after only two months in production.

== AISH-4 ==
AISH-4

Overview
- Production: 1955-1956

Body and chassis
- Related: Prince AFTF Truck

Powertrain
- Engine: 1.5L FG4A-20 I4
- Transmission: 4-speed manual

Dimensions
- Wheelbase: 2,460 mm (96.9 in)
- Length: 4,290 mm (168.9 in)
- Width: 1,655 mm (65.2 in)
- Height: 1,633 mm (64.3 in)
- Curb weight: 1,254 kg (2,765 lb)

The AISH-4 was released in February 1955 and was identical to the AISH-3 except for the engine, which was modified with a new cylinder head design that raised compression, increasing power to 52 hp (53 PS; 39 kW) and top speed to 115 km/h (71 mph).

== AISH-5 ==
AISH-5
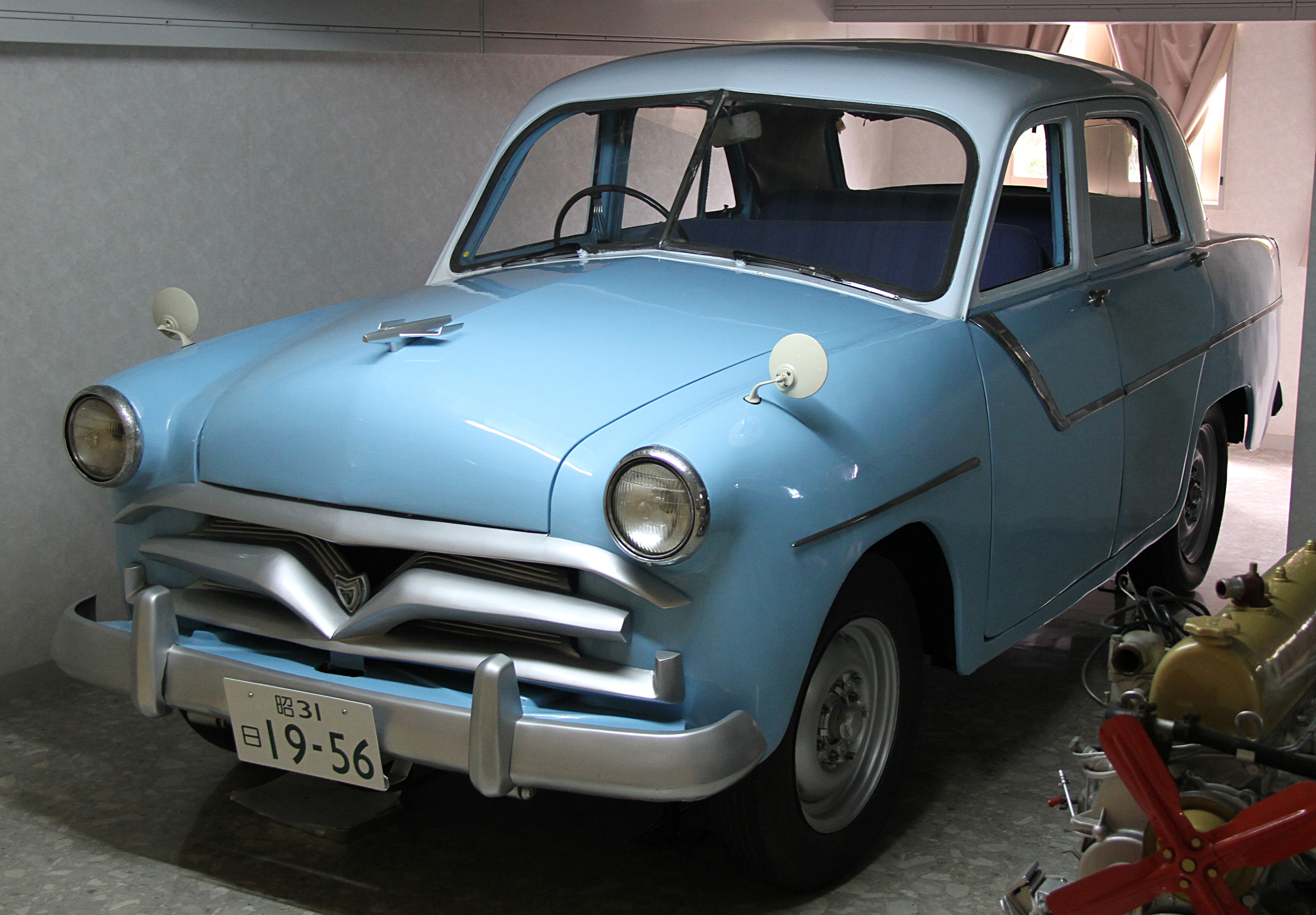
- 1956 Prince AISH-5 Sedan

Overview
- Production: 1956-1957

Powertrain
- Engine: 1.5L FG4A-20 I4
- Transmission: 4-speed manual

Dimensions
- Wheelbase: 2,460 mm (96.9 in)
- Length: 4,290 mm (168.9 in)
- Width: 1,655 mm (65.2 in)
- Height: 1,633 mm (64.3 in)
- Curb weight: 1,300 kg (2,866 lb)

The AISH-5 was released in October 1955. The engine and transmission remained the same, but the exterior was redesigned. The grille was changed and now featured a "V" cast in the middle bar. The side strips were redesigned with a 45 degree bend in the front portion. Two-tone paint, a popular option, was introduced with the AISH-5. In addition to the Sedan Standard there was also a Deluxe model, featuring extra equipment such as a radio, white sidewall tires, and an exterior sun visor.

In 1955 two commercial vehicles based on the AISH-5 were released: the AIPC-1 double cab pickup and the AIVE-1 delivery van.

In March 1956 the AMSH-1 was released. This model was nearly identical to the AISH-5 except for the double wishbone independent front suspension which provided improved ride quality.

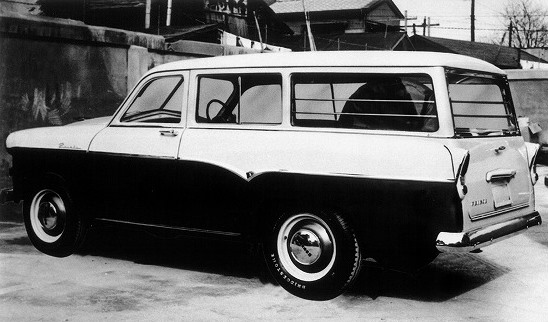
Prince Commercial Van AIVE-1

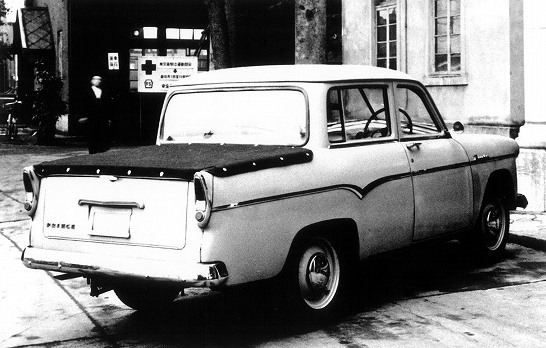
Prince Commercial Pickup AIPC-1

== AISH-6 ==
AISH-6

Overview
- Production: 1957

Powertrain
- Engine: 1.5L FG4A-30 I4
- Transmission: 4-speed manual

Dimensions
- Wheelbase: 2,486 mm (97.9 in)
- Length: 4,290 mm (168.9 in)
- Width: 1,655 mm (65.2 in)
- Height: 1,633 mm (64.3 in)
- Curb weight: 1,300 kg (2,866 lb)

The AISH-6, the final model in the AISH series, was released in October 1956. The grille was the same as the previous model, but the side strips were changed, now running horizontally the length of the car, except for a small V-shaped dip near the back of the rear doors. Two-tone paint remained available, but the colors were reversed: the dominant color was on the top section of the car and the contrast section on the bottom, opposite that of the previous model. Engine power increased again to 60 hp (61 PS; 45 kW) thanks to higher compression as improved quality fuel was becoming available in Japan.

The commercial variants were upgraded as well and were redesignated AIPC-2 and AIVE-2. An upmarket model with independent front suspension, the AMSH-2, was also available.

== History ==
- November 1951 - The prototype of Tama's new gasoline-engine truck AFTF was completed.
- November 1951 - Tama Electric Car Company changed its name to Tama Motor Company.
- February 1952 - The prototype of Tama's new passenger car AISH sedan was completed. (Both AFTF truck and AISH sedan used Fuji Precision's FG4A engine. Both of them were named "Prince" after the upcoming ceremonial investiture of Crown Prince Akihito in November 1952.)
- March 1952 - The Prince Sedan AISH and the Prince Truck AFTF debuted at the exhibition show held at the Bridgestone building in Kyobashi, Tokyo.
  - Surprisingly, the Prince Sedan AISH was not tested enough before the debut. And the second prototype car of AISH was recklessly sold to the Tokyo Institute of Technology as a product. Thus, Tama/Prince customers (mainly taxicab companies) would experience many troubles for a while.

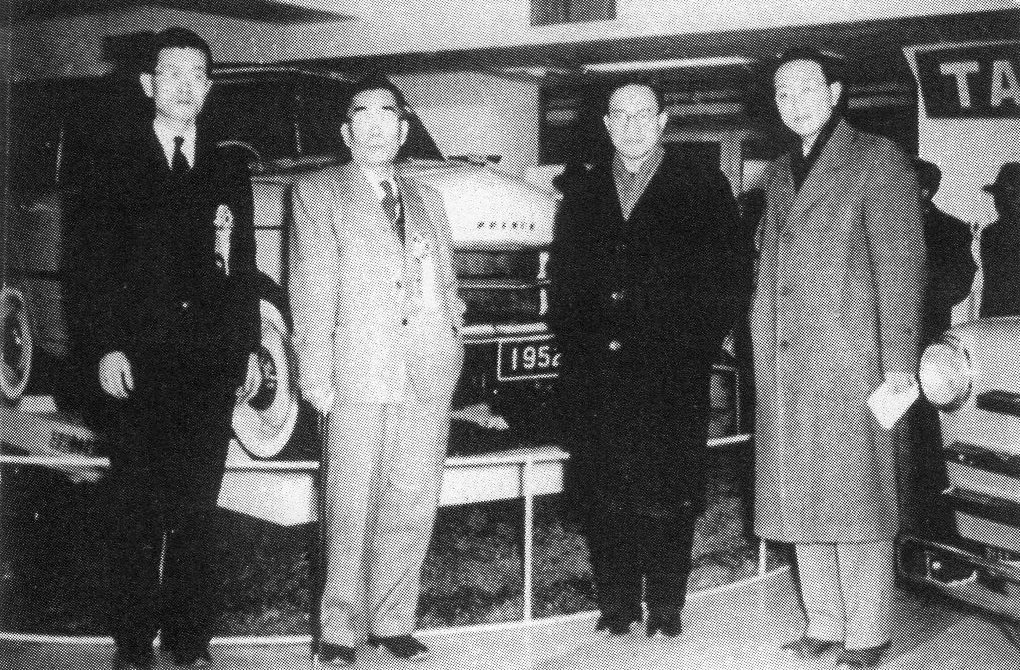
Tama Motor Company executives at the exhibition show of the Prince vehicles held at the Bridgestone headquarters in Kyobashi, Tokyo in March 1952. From left to right, Tamotsu Toyama (executive director. Former prototype aircraft workshop manager of Tachikawa Aircraft Company), Satoichiro Suzuki (president), Shojiro Ishibashi (chairman of Tama Motors and the president of Bridgestone) and Kanichiro Ishibashi (executive director. Son of Shojiro Ishibashi).

- August 1952 - Tama Motors hold the Mount Fuji Climbing Campaign. Two Prince Sedans and two Prince Trucks participated to show their durability. They climbed up to the fifth station of Mount Fuji without troubles.

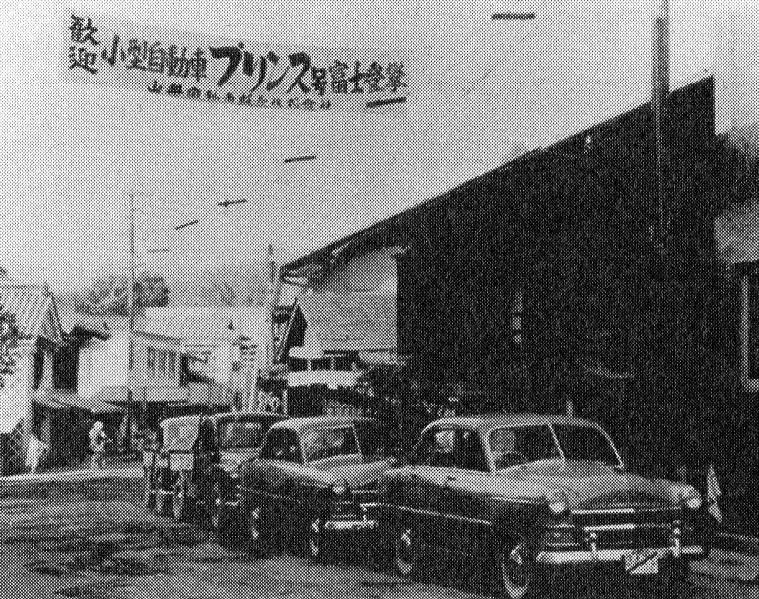
Prince Sedan AISH's and Prince Truck AFTF's at the Mount Fuji Climbing Campaign in August 1952.

- November 1952 - Tama Motor Company changed its name to the Prince Motor Company.
- April 1954 - Prince Motor Company was merged with Fuji Precision Industries. (The name "Prince Motor Company" disappeared in the meantime.)
- June 1954 - Prince Motors gave a Prince Sedan AISH to the Crown Prince as a gift.

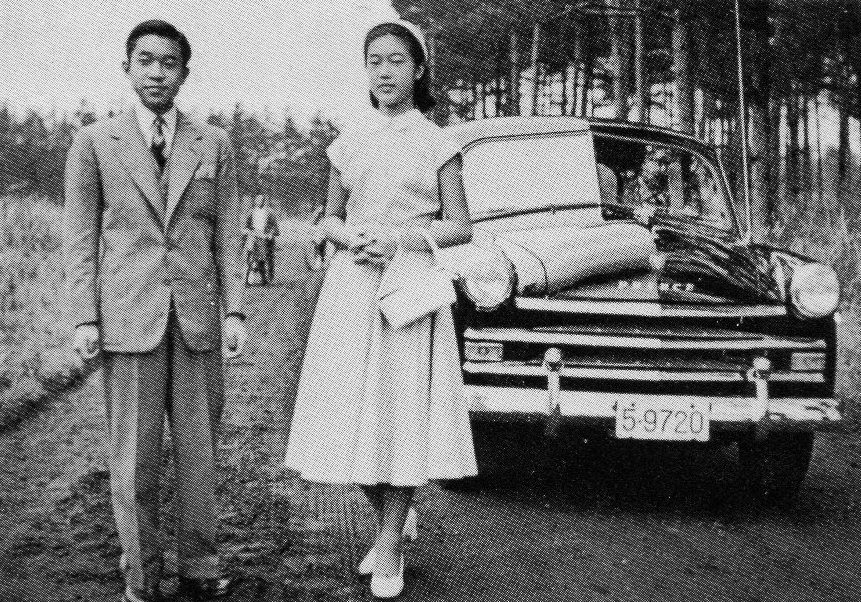
Crown Prince Akihito and his younger sister Princess Suga in front of his Prince Sedan AISH-II in 1954.

- March 1955 - The Prince Sedan Special AMSH debuted and was added to the Prince Sedan line-up along with the AISH. The Sedan Special AMSH had an independent front suspension.
- June 1956 - The variants Prince Commercial Van AIVE (station wagon) and the Prince Commercial Pickup AIPC (double cab) debuted and were added to the Prince Sedan line-up.
- April 1957 - The first generation Prince Skyline ALSI debuted and replaced the Prince Sedan AISH and AMSH.
- April 1959 - The Prince Commercial Van AIVE and the Prince Commercial Pickup AIPC were replaced by the Prince Skyway Light Van ALVG (station wagon) and the Prince Skyway Pickup ALPE (double cab).

== See also ==
- Shojiro Ishibashi
- Jiro Tanaka
- Shinichiro Sakurai
