= Prince G engine =

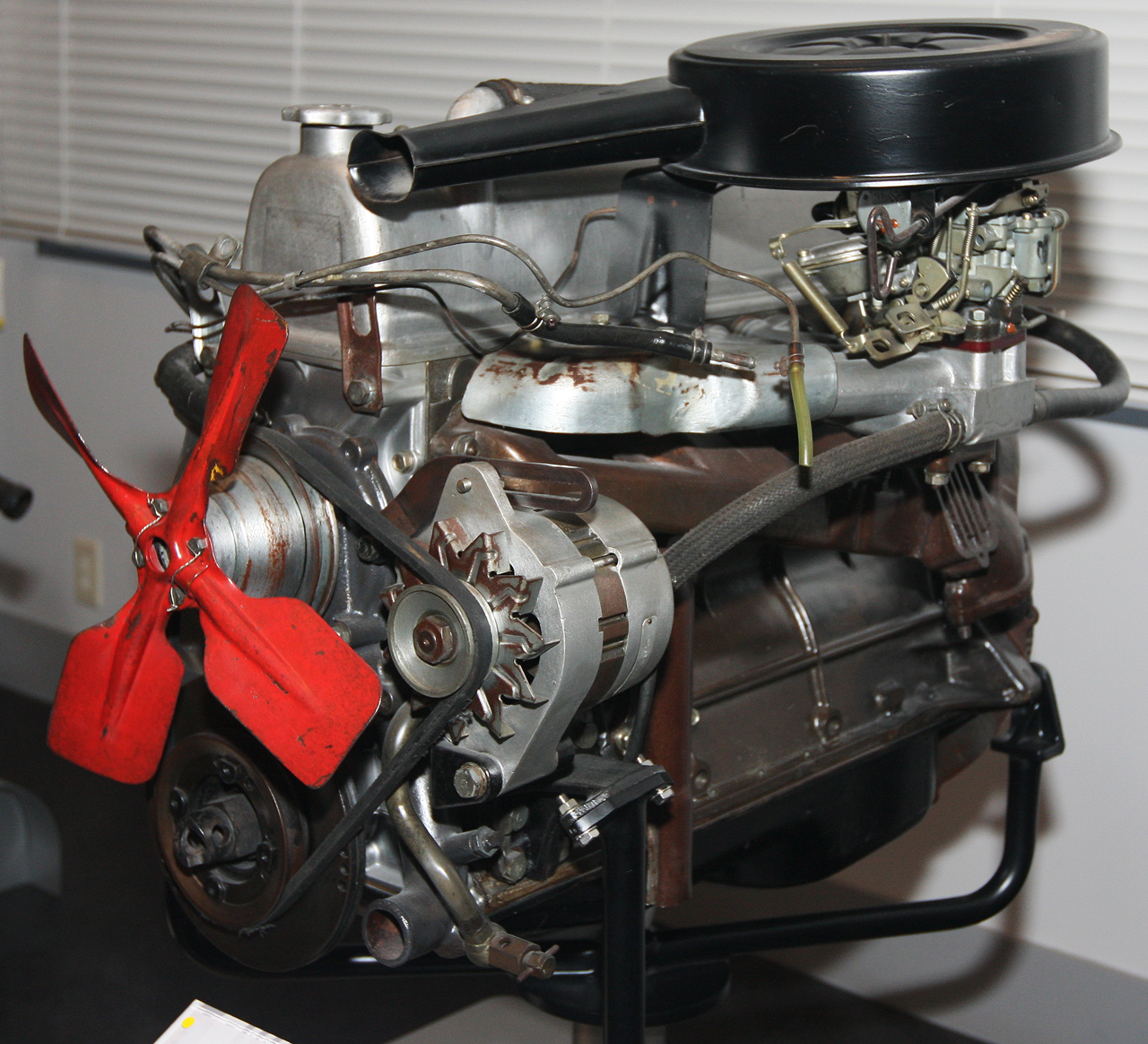

Overview
- Manufacturer: Prince Motor Company
- Production: 1955-1975

Layout
- Configuration: Inline 4 & Inline 6
- Displacement: Four-cylinder: 1.5 L (1,484 cc); 1.6 L (1,593 cc); 1.8 L (1,815 cc); 1.9 L (1,862 cc); 2.0 L (1,990 cc); Six-cylinder: 2.0 L (1,988 cc); 2.5 L (2,494 cc)
- Cylinder bore: 75 mm (2.95 in); 80 mm (3.15 in); 82 mm (3.23 in); 84 mm (3.31 in); 89 mm (3.5 in)
- Piston stroke: 63 mm (2.48 in); 70.2 mm (2.76 in); 80 mm (3.15 in); 84 mm (3.31 in); 85 mm (3.35 in)
- Valvetrain: OHV (GA30, GA4, GB30); SOHC (all except GR-8, GA30, GA4, GB30); DOHC (GR-8)
- Compression ratio: 8.3:1, 9.3:1, 9.7:1, 11.0:1

Combustion
- Fuel system: SU or Weber carburetors Mechanical fuel injection
- Fuel type: Gasoline, Diesel
- Cooling system: Water cooled

Output
- Power output: 46–223 PS (34–164 kW; 45–220 bhp)
- Torque output: 10–19.9 kg⋅m (98–195 N⋅m; 72–144 lb⋅ft)

Chronology
- Predecessor: FG4A
- Successor: L16 (G-16); L18 (G-18); S20 (GR-8)

The Prince G-series engine was the company's only straight-four and straight-six engines which began production in 1955. A number of variations were made, with both OHV and OHC heads. A diesel four-cylinder with 1.9 L (1,862 cc) was also built, called the D-6. The G series was used in the Skyline, the Laurel, and the Gloria from the 1950s to the early 1970s.

Note that, prior to its merger with Prince, Nissan also made a G series of engines. These are unrelated engines and are documented at the Nissan G engine page.

The source of the listed information is the corresponding article at Japanese Wikipedia.

== Flat-2 ==
In 1956, Prince developed a flat-2 engine, the FG2D, for their DPSK (later CPSK) concept car. It displaced 601 cc and produced 24 hp (24 PS). The engine suffered excessive vibration and noise issues and was replaced with the FG4C engine.

== Flat-4 ==
Prince developed the FG4C, a flat-four displacing 599 cc and producing 38 hp (39 PS), as a replacement for the FG2D. The FG4C was used in the 1957 CPSK concept.

== Straight-4 ==
=== FG4A-10 ===
1.5 L (1,484 cc) diameter X stroke: 75 mm × 84 mm (2.95 in × 3.31 in), OHV

- Maximum output (gross) 46 PS (34 kW; 45 bhp) @ 4000 rpm
- Maximum torque (gross) 10 kg⋅m (98 N⋅m; 72 lb⋅ft) @ 2000 rpm
- 1952-1955 Prince Sedan AISH
- 1952-1954 Prince Truck AFTF

=== FG4A-20 ===
1.5 L (1,484 cc) diameter X stroke: 75 mm × 84 mm (2.95 in × 3.31 in), OHV

- Maximum output (gross) 53 PS (39 kW; 52 bhp) @ 4000 rpm
- Maximum torque (gross) 10.4 kg⋅m (102 N⋅m; 75 lb⋅ft) @ 2000 rpm
- 1955-1956 Prince AIPC-1
- 1955-1956 Prince AIVE-1
- 1955-1957 Prince Sedan AISH
- 1955-1956 Prince Truck AFTF
- 1955-1956 Prince Truck AKTG
- 1956 Prince BNSJ concept (increased to 1.9L)

=== FG4A-30 ===
1.5 L (1,484 cc) diameter X stroke: 75 mm × 84 mm (2.95 in × 3.31 in), OHV

- Maximum output (gross) 61 PS (45 kW; 60 bhp) @ 4000 rpm
- Maximum torque (gross) 10.75 kg⋅m (105 N⋅m; 78 lb⋅ft) @ 2000 rpm

Renamed GA-30 in 1958

Applications:

- 1957 Prince AIPC-2
- 1957 Prince AIVE-2
- 1957 Prince Sedan AISH-6
- 1957 Prince Truck AFTF-8
- 1957 Prince Miler AOTH-1
- 1957 Prince Miler AOVH-1
- 1957 Prince ALPE-1
- 1957 Prince ALVG-1
- 1957 Prince AKTG-4

=== GA-30 ===
1.5 L (1,484 cc) diameter X stroke: 75 mm × 84 mm (2.95 in × 3.31 in), OHV

- Maximum output (gross) 61 PS (45 kW; 60 bhp) @ 4400 rpm
- Maximum torque (gross) 10.75 kg⋅m (105 N⋅m; 78 lb⋅ft) @ 3200 rpm
- 1957 Prince Skyline ALSI-1
- 1957-1961 Prince Skyline ALSI-2
- 1957-1958 Prince Truck ALPE
- 1958-1959 Prince Miler ARTH-1 (New Miler)
- 1958-1960 Prince Truck AQTI-1

=== GA-4 ===
1.5 L (1,484 cc) diameter X stroke: 75 mm × 84 mm (2.95 in × 3.31 in), OHV

- Maximum output (gross) 71 PS (52 kW; 70 bhp) @ 4000 rpm
- Maximum torque (gross) 11.5 kg⋅m (113 N⋅m; 83 lb⋅ft) @ 2000 rpm

1959 improvement on the GA-30; also known as FG4A-40

- Mechanical similarities with engine used in Subaru 1500

Applications:

- 1957-1959 Prince Skyway ALVG
- 1959-1963 Prince Miler ARTH-2
- 1958 Prince Miler Van ARVH-1
- 1958-1961 Prince Skyline ALSI-2
- 1959-1961 Prince Skyway
- 1959 Prince ALPE-2
- 1959 Prince ALVG-2
- 1960 Prince Truck AQTI-2
- 1962-1964 Prince Light Miler T430

=== GB-30 ===
1.9 L (1,862 cc) diameter X stroke: 84 mm × 84 mm (3.31 in × 3.31 in), OHV

- Maximum output (gross) 81 PS (60 kW; 80 hp) @ 4800 rpm
- Maximum torque (gross) 14.9 kg⋅m (146 N⋅m; 108 lb⋅ft) @ 3600 rpm

Also known as FG4B-30

Applications:

- 1957-1961 Prince Miler Van BRVF
- 1958 Prince Miler BRTH-1
- 1959-1960 Prince Gloria BLSIP-1
- 1960-1961 Prince Gloria BLSIP-2
- 1962 Prince BQTI-2
- 1963 Prince T631

=== GB-4 ===
1.9 L (1,862 cc) diameter X stroke: 84 mm × 84 mm (3.31 in × 3.31 in), OHV

- Maximum output (gross) 95 PS (70 kW; 94 bhp) @ 4800 rpm
- Maximum torque (gross) 15.6 kg⋅m (153 N⋅m; 113 lb⋅ft) @ 3600 rpm

Also known as FG4B-40

Applications:

- 1961-1963 Prince Gloria BLSIP-3
- 1961-1963 Prince Skyline BLSI-3
- 1959-1962 Prince Miler BRTH-2
- 1961 Prince Skyline Sport BLRA-3 Coupe & Convertible
- 1962 Prince Skyline S21
- 1962 Prince BLPE-3
- 1962 Prince BLVG-3

=== G-1 ===
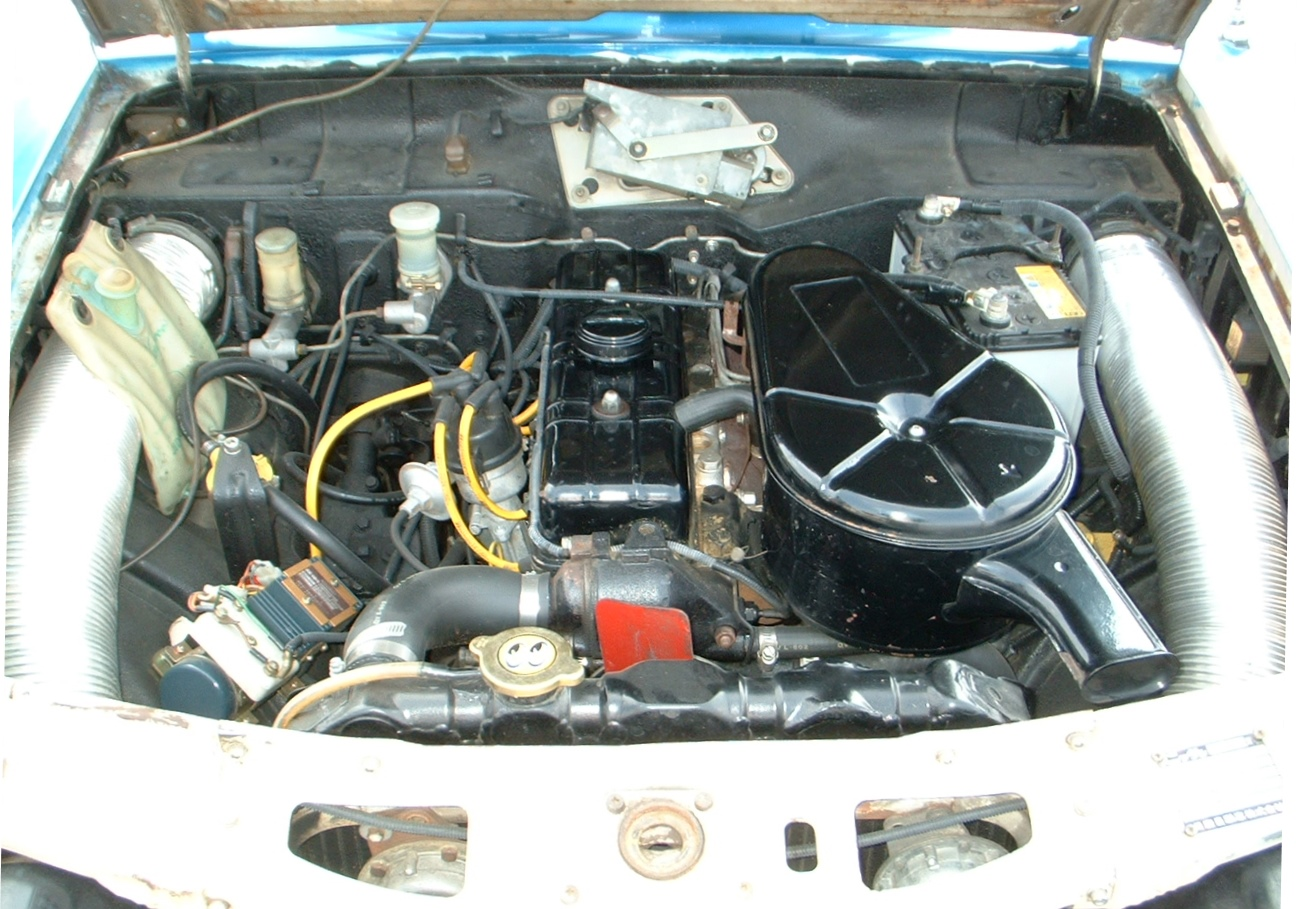
Prince G-1 engine of Nissan Prince Skyline 1500 Van Deluxe V51B

The Prince G-1 was the improved GA-4, and was rated at 1.5 L, but displaced 1.5 L; 90.6 cu in (1,484 cc) thanks to an entirely different 75 by 84 mm (2.95 by 3.31 in) bore and stroke. This undersquare arrangement was similar to the designs Nissan licensed from Austin Motor Company, though this is probably coincidental. This engine was also an OHV design and power output was similar to the Nissan G at 73 hp (54 kW; 74 PS) and 12 kg⋅m (118 N⋅m; 87 lb⋅ft).

Applications:

- 1958-1963 Prince Clipper AQTI
- 1961-1968 Prince Homer T64/T640
- 1962-1965 Prince Miler T430
- 1963 Prince Skyway V51A
- 1963-1965 Prince Clipper T630
- 1963-1967 Prince Skyline S50
- 1963-1968 Prince Skyway V51 (renamed as "Nissan Prince Skyline Van" in 1966 after the merger with Nissan)
- 1965-1966 Prince Light Miler T440

=== G-2 ===
The G-2 is a 1.9 L; 113.6 cu in (1,862 cc) version used by Prince. Bore and stroke were square at 84 mm (3.31 in), and output was 96 hp (72 kW; 97 PS) and 15.7 kg⋅m (154 N⋅m; 114 lb⋅ft) with a 2 barrel carburetor. It was an improved version of the GB-4 and was introduced in 1962 and was installed in the S40 series Prince Gloria as well as the Clipper and Super Miler commercial vehicles. The G-2 was an OHV design.

Applications:

- 1962 Prince Skyway P23/V23
- 1962-1965 Prince Gloria S40
- 1962-1965 Prince Super Miler T431
- 1963 Prince 1900 Sprint concept
- 1963-1967 Prince Clipper T631
- 1964-1967 Prince Super Miler T441
- 1965 Prince T65

=== G-15 ===
The SOHC G-15 was a 1.5 L; 90.5 cu in (1,483 cc) engine produced in 1967 for the Skyline. Bore and stroke was 82 mm × 70.2 mm (3.23 in × 2.76 in). With a 2 barrel carburetor equipped, the engine produced 88 PS (65 kW; 87 hp) and 12.2 kg⋅m (120 N⋅m; 88 lb⋅ft). With a crossflow cylinder head, a V-shaped canted valve arrangement and a multi-spherical combustion chamber design, the G-15 was the most technologically advanced Japanese car engine of its day, eclipsing even Nissan's L series engine in their design. The Nissan G engine was not related to the Prince engine; the Nissan version was OHV and slightly smaller displacement. The G-15 was discontinued in 1972 when the C110 Skyline was introduced.

Applications:

- 1967 Prince Skyline S57D
- 1968-1972 Nissan Skyline 1500 (C10)

=== G-16 ===
1.6 L (1,593 cc) inside diameter x stroke: 85 mm × 70.2 mm (3.35 in × 2.76 in) mmin, SOHC

- maximum output (gross) 100 PS (74 kW; 99 bhp) @ 6000 rpm
- Maximum torque (gross) 13.8 kg⋅m (135 N⋅m; 100 lb⋅ft) @ 4000 rpm

The G-18 was de-stroked to 70.2 mm (2.76 in) to form the G-16. Adapting the engine to more stringent US emissions was deemed too expensive, and it was replaced by the Nissan L16 engine in 1975.

Applications:

- 1972-1975 Nissan Skyline 1600 (C110)

=== G-18 ===
The G-18 was a 1.8 L; 110.8 cu in (1,815 cc). Its 85 mm (3.35 in) bore was the largest in the range (except for the G20 mentioned in the next paragraph), and the 80 mm (3.15 in) stroke gave it good oversquare dimensions. It was an SOHC cross flow cylinder head design like the G-15 and produced 105 hp (78 kW; 106 PS) and 15.9 kg⋅m (156 N⋅m; 115 lb⋅ft).

This engine was discontinued in 1975 due to tightening emission regulations and replaced with the L18.

Applications:

- 1968-1972 Nissan Skyline 1800 (PC10)
- 1968-1972 Nissan Laurel C30
- 1972-1975 Nissan Skyline 1800 (PC110)
- 1972-1975 Nissan Laurel C130

=== G-20 ===
2.0 L (1,990 cc) inside diameter x stroke: 89 mm × 80 mm (3.50 in × 3.15 in), SOHC

Twin Barrel single Carburetor

- compression ratio 8.3:1
- maximum output (gross) 110 PS (81 kW; 108 bhp) @ 5600 rpm
- maximum torque (gross) 16.5 kg⋅m (162 N⋅m; 119 lb⋅ft) @ 3200 rpm

Twin SU carburetor regular gasoline

- compression ratio 8.3:1
- maximum output (gross) 120 PS (88 kW; 118 bhp) @ 5800 rpm
- maximum torque (gross) 17 kg⋅m (167 N⋅m; 123 lb⋅ft) @ 3600 rpm

Twin SU carburetor high octane gasoline

- compression ratio 9.7:1
- maximum output (gross) 125 PS (92 kW; 123 bhp) @ 5800 rpm
- maximum torque (gross) 17.2 kg⋅m (169 N⋅m; 124 lb⋅ft) @ 3600 rpm

This engine was only used in the 1968-1975 C30 & C130 Laurel, and was discontinued in 1975 due to tightening emission regulations.

== Straight-6 ==
Prince used a straight-6 version of the G family in their famous Skyline cars. All of the Prince straight-6 engines used single overhead cam heads. Engine displacement was kept below 2000cc to limit the amount of Road tax to be paid yearly in addition to other Japanese Government mandated expenses.

=== G-7 ===
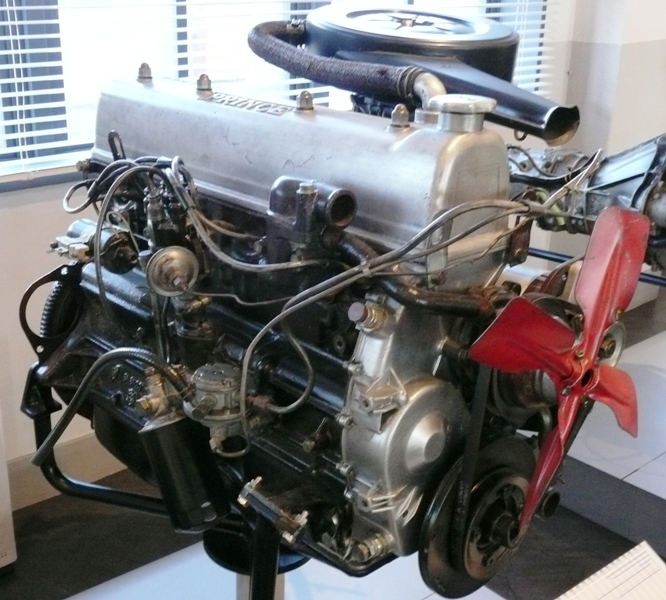
Prince G-7 engine

The G-7 is a straight-6 version displacing 2.0 L; 121.3 cu in (1,988 cc). It was the engine of the GT-model Prince Skylines and was an OHC engine unlike the mainly-OHV family that spawned it. Bore and stroke were square at 75 mm (2.95 in) and power output varied with the carburetor equipped. Plain versions featured a 2 barrel carb and 8.8:1 for 106 hp (79 kW; 107 PS) and 16 kg⋅m (157 N⋅m; 116 lb⋅ft), while the 1965 Skyline GT-B used 3 twin-barrel Weber carburetors and 9.3:1 compression for 127 hp (95 kW; 129 PS) and 17 kg⋅m (167 N⋅m; 123 lb⋅ft). It was influenced by the Mercedes-Benz M180 straight six engine. The intake and exhaust manifolds are on the left side of the engine because Japanese drivers sit on the right side and the steering column would interfere, while the Mercedes-Benz engine places the intake and exhaust on the right side due to left hand driving conditions.

Applications:

- 1963-1967 Prince Gloria S41
- 1965-1968 Prince Skyline 2000 GT-A S54AE
- 1965-1968 Prince Skyline 2000 GT-B S54BE (3 Weber 40 DCOE carburetors)
- 1967-1969 Nissan (Prince) Gloria PA30

=== G7B-R ===
2.0 L (1,988 cc) inside diameter x stroke: 75 mm × 75 mm (2.95 in × 2.95 in)

An improvement on the G7 using a cross-flow cylinder head and was converted into racing use during 1965 - 1966 in the S54 Skyline GT used for racing. Was not commercially available.

=== GR-8 ===
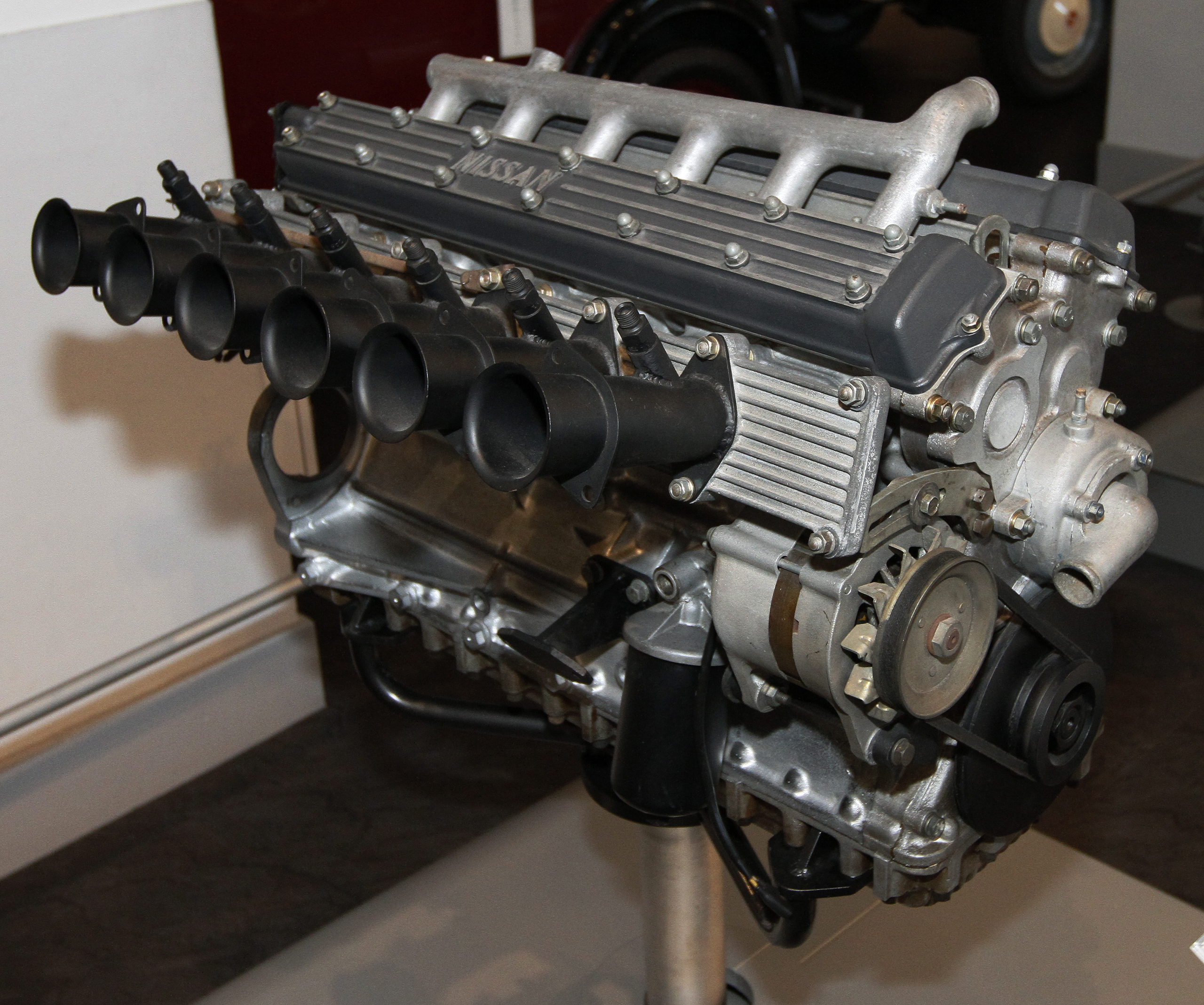
Prince/Nissan GR-8 engine displayed at Nissan's engine museum

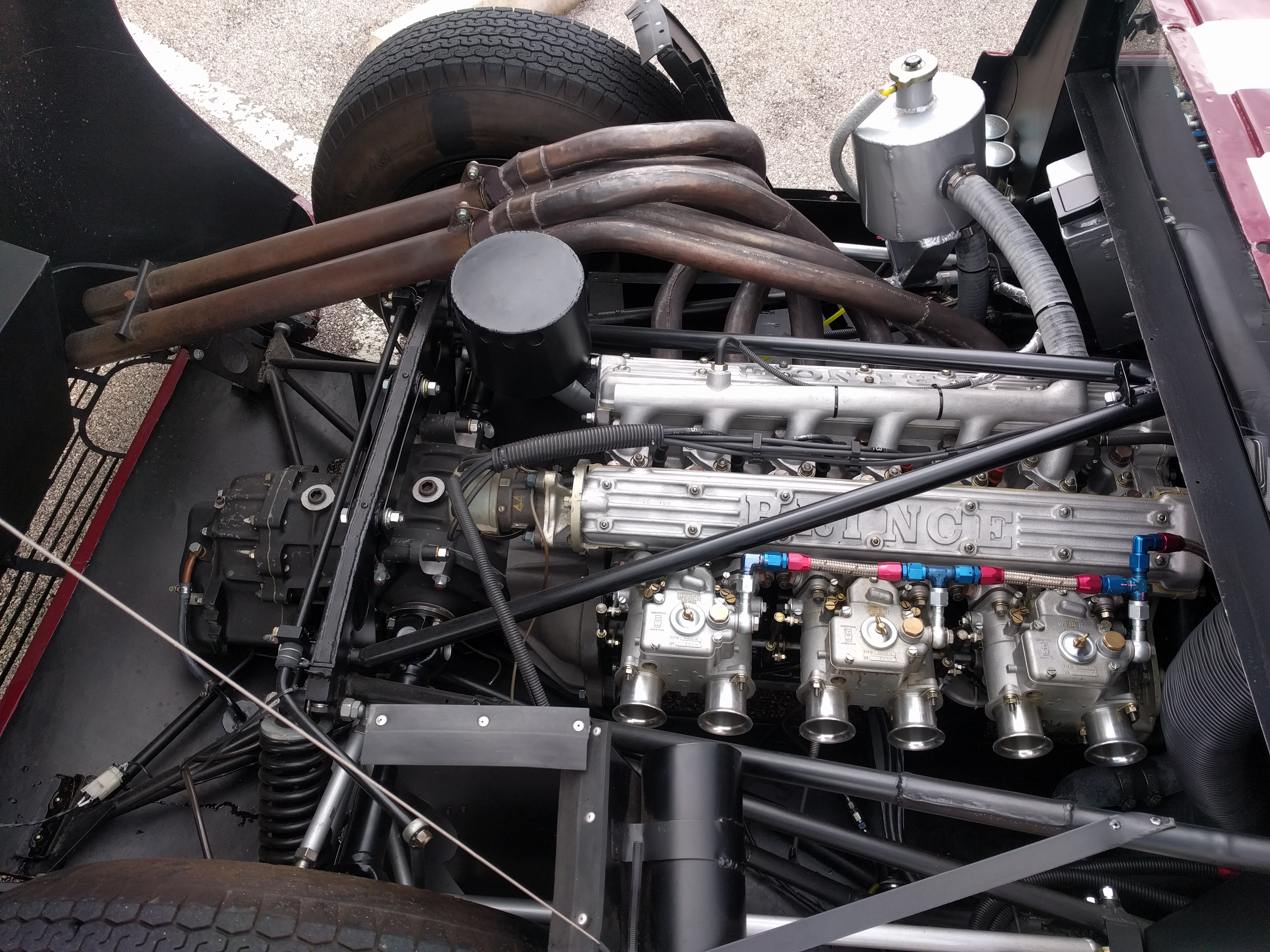
Prince/Nissan GR-8 engine in a R380 race car

2.0 L (1,996 cc) inside diameter x stroke: 82 mm × 63 mm (3.23 in × 2.48 in), DOHC

- compression ratio 11.0:1
- maximum output (gross) more than 200 PS (147 kW; 197 bhp) @ 8400 rpm
- maximum torque (gross) 17.5 kg⋅m (172 N⋅m; 127 lb⋅ft) @ 6400 rpm

	R380-I 1965	R380A-I 1966	R380A-II 1967	R380A-III 1968	R380A-III 1969
Fuel delivery	3× Weber 42 DCOE		3× Weber 45 DCOE	Lucas fuel injection	
Power (gross)	200 PS (147 kW; 197 bhp) @ 8000 rpm	over 200 PS (147 kW; 197 bhp) @ 8000 rpm	220 PS (162 kW; 217 bhp) @ 8500 rpm	245 PS (180 kW; 242 bhp) @ 8400 rpm	250 PS (184 kW; 247 bhp) @ 8400 rpm

Racing engine used in the Prince R380 and Nissan R380-II, based on the G7 engine. It used 4 valves per cylinders and DOHC, used 3 Weber carburetors model 42DCOE-18, producing a claimed 200 hp (149 kW; 203 PS) for the R380 and 220 hp (164 kW; 223 PS) for the R380-II. The GR-8 used in the R380-III featured mechanical fuel injection.

The Nissan S20 engine was derived from the GR-8.

=== G-11 ===
The G-11 is another straight-6 OHC version, displacing 2.5 L; 152.2 cu in (2,494 cc). Bore was up to 84 mm (3.31 in) like the G-2 4-cylinder, while stroke remained at 75 mm (2.95 in) as on the G-7. Power output with a 4 barrel carburetor was 134 hp (100 kW; 136 PS) with 19.9 kg⋅m (195 N⋅m; 144 lb⋅ft) of torque.

Applications:

- 1964-1967 Prince Grand Gloria S44P

== See also ==
- List of Nissan engines
- Nissan G engine
