= Nissan S20 engine =

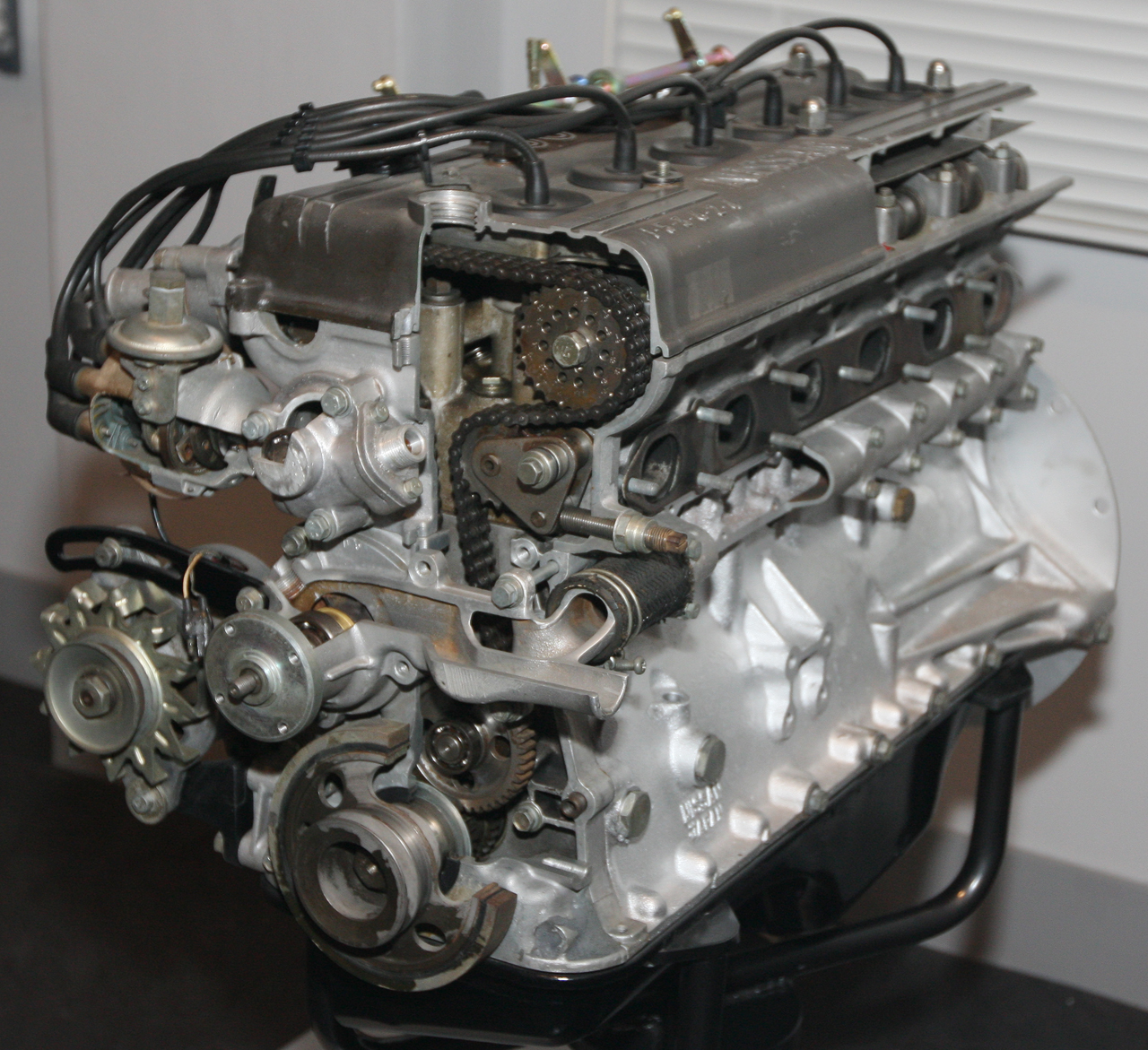

Overview
- Manufacturer: Nissan Motors
- Designer: Yuji Sakakibara
- Production: 1968–1973

Layout
- Configuration: Straight-6
- Displacement: 2.0 L; 121.4 cu in (1,990 cc)
- Cylinder bore: 82 mm (3.23 in)
- Piston stroke: 62.8 mm (2.47 in)
- Valvetrain: DOHC 4 valves × cyl.
- Valvetrain drive system: Timing chain

Combustion
- Fuel system: 3× Mikuni-Solex N40PHH-A24 carburetors Lucas mechanical fuel injection
- Fuel type: Gasoline
- Cooling system: Water-cooled

Output
- Power output: 160 hp (119 kW; 162 PS)
- Specific power: 80.4 hp (60.0 kW; 81.5 PS) per liter
- Torque output: 177 N⋅m; 130 lbf⋅ft (18 kg⋅m)

Dimensions
- Dry weight: 199 kg (439 lb)

Chronology
- Predecessor: Prince GR-8

The Nissan S20 engine 2.0 L (1,989 cc) (Note: Nominally, with a bore and stroke of 82×62.8 mm, the S20 has a swept displacement of 1989.9 cc. However, Nissan considers the displacement to be 1,989 cc.) is a straight-6 four-valve DOHC internal combustion engine produced by Nissan from 1969 to 1973, originally designed by engineers of the former Prince. It was the first mass-produced Japanese engine with more than two valves per cylinder.

Essentially a revised production variant of the 1966 Prince GR-8 engine from Prince/Nissan's R380 racecar, it produces 160 hp (119 kW; 162 PS) at 7000 rpm and 177 N⋅m; 130 lbf⋅ft (18 kg⋅m) of torque at 5600 rpm and weighs 199 kg (439 lb). The S20 powered Nissan's Skyline GT-R (C10 and C110) and Fairlady Z432 models.

While the engine code is similar, the S20 should not be confused with the SR20 engine family (consisting of the SR20Di, SR20DE, SR20DET, SR20VE, and SR20VET engines), which are unrelated straight-4 DOHC petrol engines based on the SR series used in other Nissan models.

== History ==
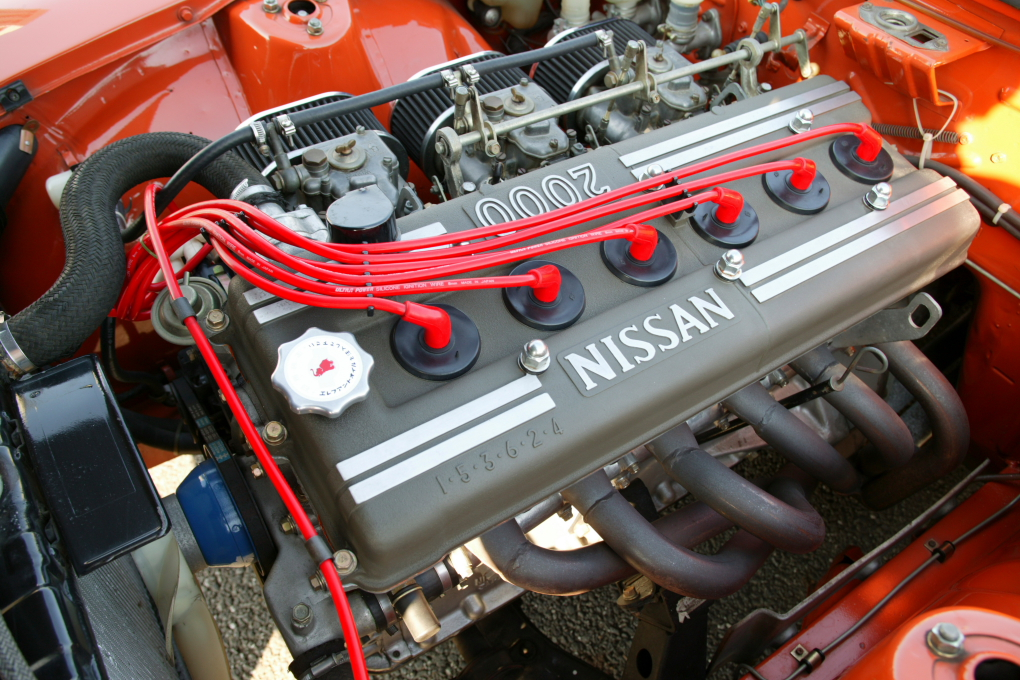
S20 engine installed in Fairlady Z432

The S20 was one of the technical carryovers to the Nissan brand from Prince technology. Prince had been producing the Skyline since the model's inception in the 1950s; following the merger of the two companies, Nissan took over production of the Skyline, which received the new engine in the late 1960s.

The third generation Skyline was exhibited at the 1968 Tokyo Motor Show in October, which included a special "Skyline 2000GT Racing" model equipped with the S20; it was promoted as being equipped with the same engine as the R380. The production Skyline 2000GT-R (chassis code PGC10 for the four-door saloon) was introduced in February 1969, followed by the Skyline Hardtop 2000GT-R coupe (chassis code KPGC10, with a shortened wheelbase and 2 fewer doors) in 1970. The two models (PGC10/KPGC10) would later collectively win 49 straight Japan touring car victories between 1969 and 1971.

Aside from its use in the PGC10/KPGC10 Skylines, the S20 also was fitted to the Nissan Fairlady Z432, a sports racing model of the Nissan Fairlady Z (S30) line, starting in fall 1969. The Z432 designation was derived from the design of the S20: four valves per cylinder, three carburetors, and two overhead camshafts. In addition to the S20, changes in the Z432 version included a 5-speed manual transmission and a limited-slip differential. A special lightened variant of the Z432 was designated as Z432R, built for homologation purposes. The cost of the Z432 was nearly double the price of a standard Fairlady Z.

In September 1972, Nissan introduced the fourth generation Skyline (chassis code C110) powered by the L series of engines. A KPGC110 "Skyline 2000GT-R Racing Concept" powered by the S20 was shown at the 1972 Tokyo Motor Show after the commercial models were introduced; although the concept's number (73) hinted at Nissan's racing efforts for 1973, Nissan dropped its factory team that year in favor of developing anti-pollution technology and improving fuel efficiency in response to increasingly stringent emissions laws. In addition, the contemporary oil crisis of that year created a wasteful perception of auto racing and high-performance vehicles by many people, which led to the introduction of smaller and more economical cars from various manufacturers. Less than 200 examples of the KPGC110 GT-R would be built from January through April 1973 as a result of this. Because of its rarity and Nissan's withdrawal from touring car races at the time, the KPGC110 Skyline GT-R has been dubbed as the "Phantom GT-R".

== Engine specifications ==
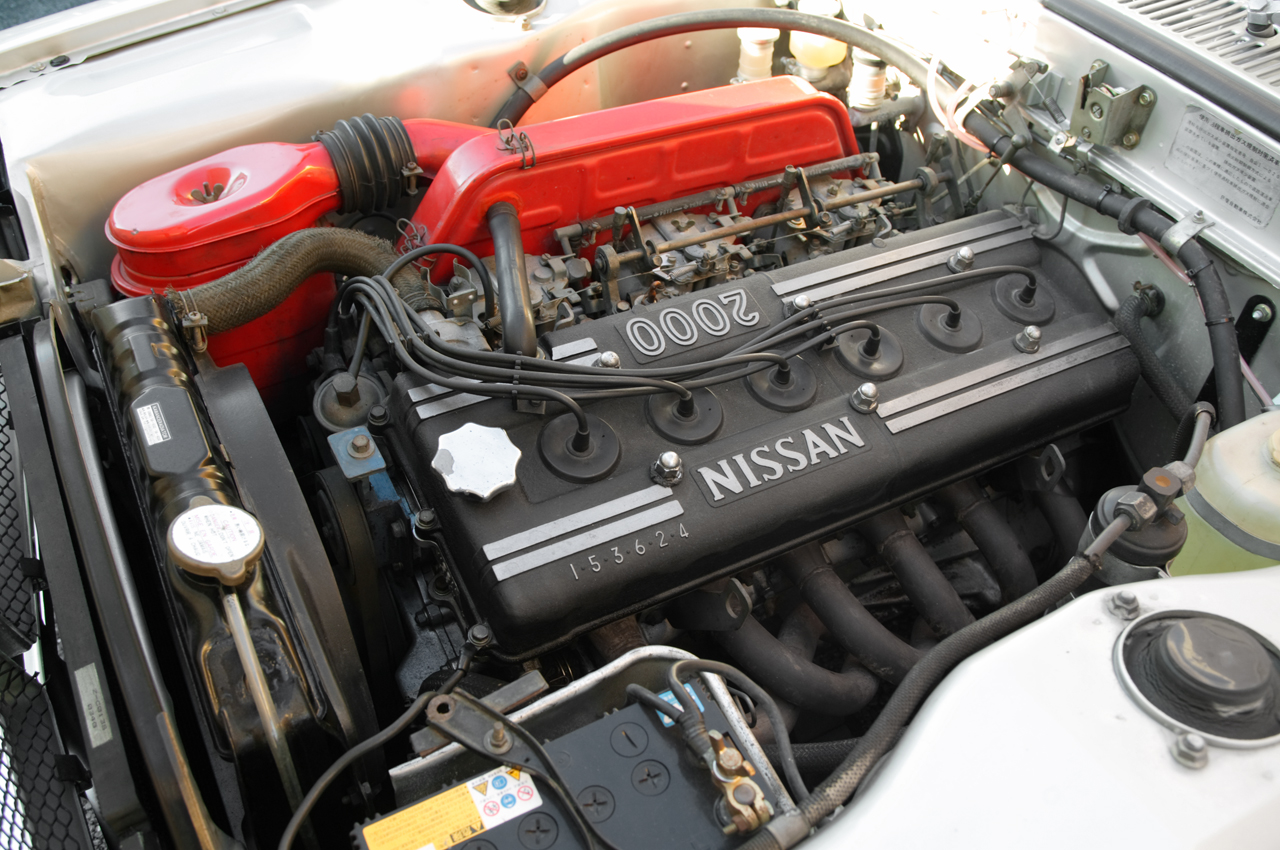
S20 Engine installed in C10 Skyline GT-R.

The S20 is an inline-six with a cast iron block and aluminum head, using a 7-bearing crankshaft. It features a dual overhead cam, cross-flow head with pent-roof combustion chamber and four valves per cylinder. Heads were ported and polished manually, and the motors were bench tested for consistent power production before installation.

Compared to the preceding GR-8, the 82 millimetres (3.2 in) bore was retained but the stroke was reduced from 63 to 62.8 millimetres (2.48 to 2.47 in) in order to ensure that displacement would not exceed 2 litres if slight errors were made during manufacturing. In addition, the valvetrain was driven by timing chains, rather than gears.

Most engines utilized triple Mikuni-Solex 40PHH dual-choke carburetors; models after 1969 offered optional Lucas mechanical fuel injection. As fitted to Shinohara's No. 39 racing car (1969), the S20 was tuned for higher output, generating 154 kW (209 PS; 207 bhp) at 8000 rpm and 196 N⋅m (20 kg⋅m; 145 lb⋅ft) at 6000 rpm. In racing trim, the fuel-injected motors reportedly produced over 225 bhp (168 kW), with 250 bhp (186 kW) for larger tracks like Fuji Speedway; custom tuning yielded race engines with 265 PS (195 kW; 261 bhp) output at 12,000 rpm.

Parameter	Value	
Type	water-cooled gasoline inline-six engine	
Displacement	1,990 cc (2.0 L; 121.4 cu in)	
Bore × Stroke	82 mm × 62.8 mm (3.23 in × 2.47 in)	
Valvetrain	DOHC 4 valves per cylinder, lifter valve direct-driven	
Fuel system	Triple Mikuni-Solex N40PHH-A24 2-barrel carburetors	fuel injection
Power (gross)	160 bhp (119 kW; 162 PS) @ 7,000 rpm	227 bhp (169 kW; 230 PS) @ 8,400 rpm
Torque (gross)	177 N⋅m; 130 lbf⋅ft (18 kg⋅m) @ 5,600 rpm	?
Lubricating oil capacity	6 L (1.3 imp gal; 1.6 US gal)	
Dry weight	199 kg (439 lb)	

== Applications ==
This engine was used in the following vehicles:

- Skyline GT-R (PGC10 type) 4-door sedan 1969–1970. (832 units)
- Skyline GT-R (KPGC10 type) 2-door coupe 1970–1972. 70 mm (2.8 in) shorter wheelbase than the PGC10. (1,197 units)
- Skyline GT-R (KPGC110 type) January–April 1973. (197 units)
- Fairlady Z432 (PS30) 1969–1972. (419 or 420 units)
- Fairlady Z432R (PS30SB) Z432 race car-based for homologation nearly 100 kg (220 lb) lighter than production Z432. (30 to 50 units)

== Motorsports ==
The first win for the S20-powered Skyline 2000GT-R was on May 3, 1969, at the TS-b race of the 1969 JAF Grand Prix held at Fuji Speedway, using the four-door PGC10; the winning car (No. 39, driven by T.Shinohara) has been preserved in the Nissan Heritage Collection. The racing saloons were joined by the hardtop coupe KPGC10 in March 1971 at the All Japan Suzuka Automobile Race. The PGC10/KPGC10 went on to win 49 consecutive races held at Fuji, Suzuka, Tsukuba, and Hokkaido; although the streak ended after the 49th win on October 10, 1971, the GT-R won its next race for its 50th victory on March 20, 1972, also held at the Fuji Circuit.

== Comparison with the L-series ==
Compared to the two-valve single overhead camshaft L-series straight-six engines used in the Fairlady Z and other models of the Skyline at the time, the S20 was just too small and complex to use, despite having dual overhead camshafts with four valves per cylinder. In the 1970 All-Japan Fuji 1000km race, seven S30 Fairlady Z models were entered; six of them were S20-powered Z432R homologation models and one of them was a production-ready L24-powered HS30 model. The HS30 model easily won over its Z432R counterparts despite having less power and slightly more weight distribution than the S20-powered Z432R models. Due to the more simpler and robust design of the L-series, it became one of the most favored engines in motorsport and tuning while the S20 remains in relative obscurity to this day.

== See also ==
- Prince Motor Company
- Nissan Skyline GT-R
- List of Nissan engines
