= Nissan L engine =

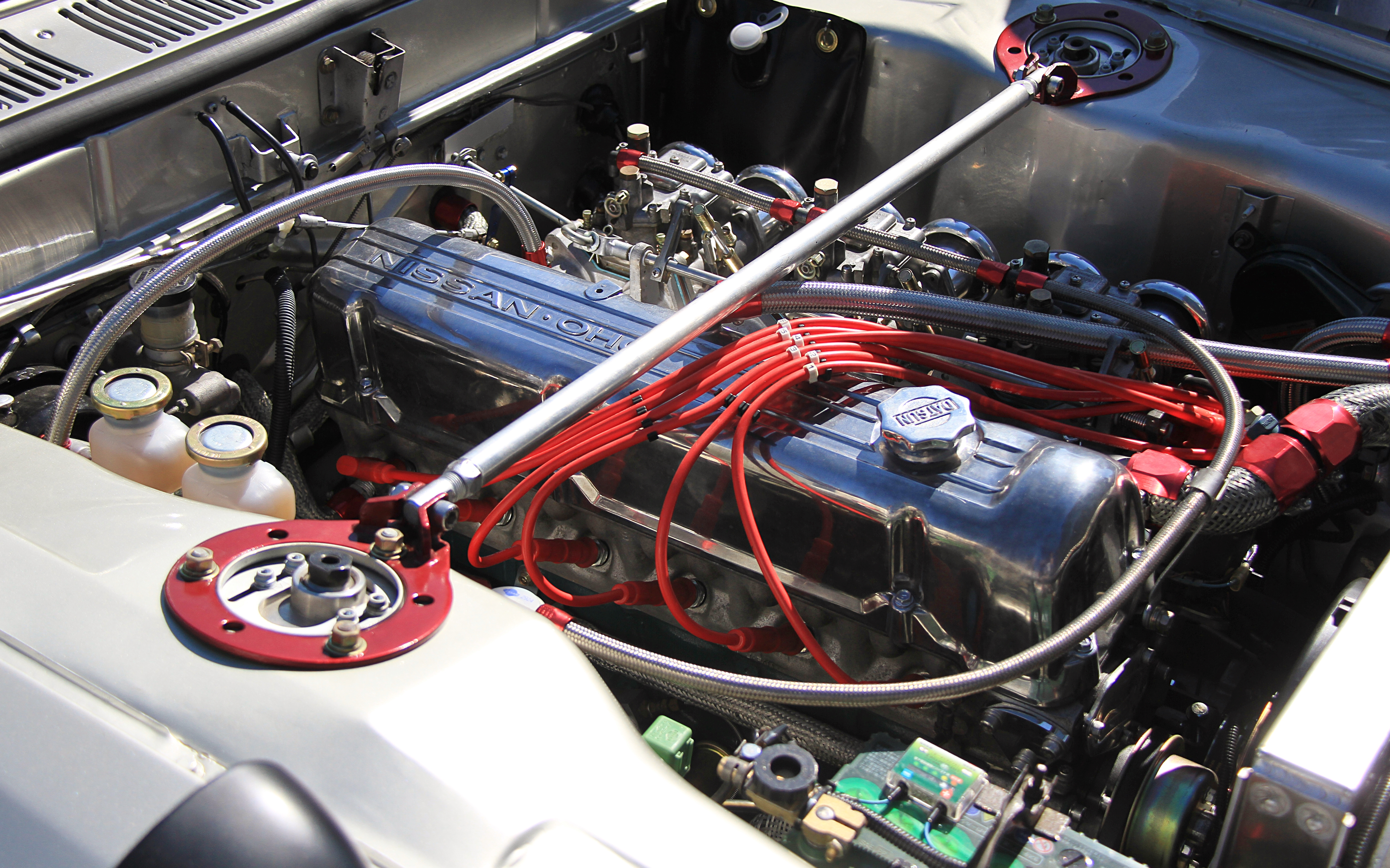
- 1971 Skyline 2000GT engine bay

Overview
- Manufacturer: Nissan (Nissan Machinery)
- Production: 1966–1986

Layout
- Configuration: Straight-4, Straight-6
- Displacement: 1.3 L (1,296 cc; 79.1 cu in); 1.4 L (1,428 cc; 87.1 cu in); 1.6 L (1,595 cc; 97.3 cu in); 1.6 L (1,598 cc; 97.5 cu in); 1.8 L (1,770 cc; 108.0 cu in); 2.0 L (1,952 cc; 119.1 cu in); 2.0 L (1,998 cc; 121.9 cu in); 2.3 L (2,262 cc; 138.0 cu in); 2.4 L (2,393 cc; 146.0 cu in); 2.6 L (2,565 cc; 156.5 cu in); 2.8 L (2,753 cc; 168.0 cu in); 2.8 L (2,792 cc; 170.4 cu in)
- Cylinder bore: 78 mm (3.07 in); 83 mm (3.27 in); 84.5 mm (3.33 in); 85 mm (3.35 in); 86 mm (3.39 in); 87.8 mm (3.46 in); 89 mm (3.50 in)
- Piston stroke: 59.9 mm (2.36 in); 66 mm (2.60 in); 67.9 mm (2.67 in); 69.7 mm (2.74 in); 73.7 mm (2.90 in); 78 mm (3.07 in); 79 mm (3.11 in); 83 mm (3.27 in); 86 mm (3.39 in)
- Cylinder block material: Cast iron
- Cylinder head material: Aluminium
- Valvetrain: SOHC, DOHC (LZ, aftermarket heads)
- Compression ratio: 7.4:1, 8.3:1, 8.8:1

Combustion
- Fuel system: Carburetor, Fuel injection
- Fuel type: Gasoline, Diesel
- Cooling system: Water-cooled

Output
- Power output: 65–570 PS (48–419 kW; 64–562 hp)
- Torque output: 103–170 N⋅m; 76–125 lbf⋅ft (10.5–17.3 kg⋅m)

Chronology
- Predecessor: G
- Successor: Z, CA (Straight-4); RB (Straight-6); VG (V6)

The Nissan L series of automobile engines was produced from 1966 through 1986 in both inline-four and inline-six configurations ranging from 1.3 L to 2.8 L. It is a two-valves per cylinder SOHC non-crossflow engine, with an iron block and an aluminium head. It was most notable as the engine of the Datsun 510, Datsun 240Z sports car, and the Nissan Maxima. These engines are known for their reliability, durability, and parts interchangeability.

The four-cylinder L series engines were replaced with the Z series and later the CA series, while the six-cylinder L series engines were replaced with the VG series and RB series.

== History ==
The L series started with the production of the six-cylinder L20 in 1966. This engine was rushed into production by Datsun and was designed prior to the Prince merger using the Mercedes overhead cam engine as a model. It was discontinued two years later.

Learning lessons from the first L20, the four-cylinder L16 was developed in 1967. The L16 four-cylinder design was influenced by the Mercedes-Benz M180 engine that the Prince Motor Company developed in four- and six-cylinder displacements called the Prince G engine. This engine was given a full design and development cycle in Nissan's Small Engine Division to prevent repeating the same mistakes made from the original L20 engine. With this new engine design, the L16 went through rigorous testing and proved to be a much more superior design over the original L20. This engine set the standard for later L series engines, with the original L20 being replaced by the L16-based L20A.

== Straight-four ==
=== L13 ===
The L13 was a 1.3 L (1,296 cc; 79.1 cu in) engine with a bore × stroke of 83 mm × 59.9 mm (3.27 in × 2.36 in) that appeared in 1967. It was not available in the United States, but Canada received it in 1968 only. It produces 77 hp (57 kW; 78 PS) SAE at 6,000 rpm (export models). In the Japanese market, the gross JIS rating was used and the figure is 72 PS (53 kW) JIS at the same engine speed. Torque is 109 N⋅m (80 lb⋅ft) SAE or 103 N⋅m (76 lb⋅ft) JIS at 3,600 rpm. The L13 was essentially a short-stroke L16.

Applications:

- Nissan Bluebird (510)

=== L14 ===
The 1.4 L (1,428 cc; 87.1 cu in) L14 was destined for most of the world, but was never offered in the US.

Specifications

Bore × stroke (83 mm × 66 mm (3.27 in × 2.60 in).

85 PS JIS (63 kW) at 6,000rpm, 116 N⋅m (85 lb⋅ft) at 3,600rpm (single carburetor)

95 PS JIS (70 kW) at 6,400rpm, 122 N⋅m (90 lb⋅ft) at 4,000rpm (twin SU carburetors)

Applications:
- 1968–1973 Nissan Bluebird (510)
- Nissan Violet/140J (J710/J711)
- 1971–1973 Datsun Sunny Excellent (PB110)
- 1971–1973 Datsun Sunny Excellent - Coupé (KPB110) (April 1971)
- 1973–1976 Nissan Sunny Excellent (PB210)
- 1973–1974 Datsun 140Z (PB210) L14 with twin Dell'Orto carburetors and performance cam (South Africa special)
- 1975 Nissan GR-1 concept

=== L16 ===
The L16 is a 1.6 L (1,595 cc; 97.3 cu in) straight-four engine, typically fed by a 2-barrel Hitachi-SU carburettor, produced from 1967 through 1973 for the Nissan Bluebird, sold as the Datsun 510 in North America. It replaced the Prince G-16 in 1975. Bore and stroke were 83 mm × 73.7 mm (3.27 in × 2.90 in).

Learning lessons from the original L20, the L16 was given a full design and development cycle in Nissan's Small Engine Division. Influenced by the design of the Mercedes-Benz M180 engine that Prince Motor Company developed in four- and six-cylinder displacements called the Prince G engine, this resulted in a superior design that proved itself over time and served as the basis for the later L24 and L20A. It also serves as the basis of Nissan's "Modular L Series" lineup well into the 1980s.

In US trim, it produces 96 hp (72 kW; 97 PS) at 6,000 rpm and maximum torque of 135 N⋅m (100 lb⋅ft) at 3,600 rpm.

When this engine was installed in a 1972 Canadian 510 sedan model with manual transmission, two sets of points were installed in the distributor and this second set of points was in circuit only in third gear and under certain throttle-opening angles to obtain a different dwell angle. A similar arrangement exists in the US-spec 510/610 cars and 521/620 pickup trucks for the years 1970 –1973.

Applications:

- 1967–1973 Nissan Bluebird (P510)
- 1968–1973 Datsun 510
- 1970–1972 Datsun 521 pick-up
- 1971–1977 Nissan Bluebird/Datsun 160B) (P610)
- 1972–1973 Datsun 620 pick-up
- 1973–1977 Nissan Violet/Datsun 160J (P710/P711)
- 1977–1978 Nissan Violet/Auster/Stanza/160J (A10)

=== L16S ===
The L16S was an engine that was used in the 910 Bluebird sedan and van/wagon. This engine was equipped with an electronically controlled carburetor.

Applications:

- Nissan Bluebird (910)

=== L16T ===
The L16T was basically the same as the L16 but had twin SU carbs, flat top pistons (same as ones used in 240Z) and a slightly different head. It produces 109 PS (80 kW; 108 hp).

Applications:

- Nissan Bluebird (510) - At least in European version, where it was known as Datsun 1600SSS (P(L)510), 1968 –1972.
- Nissan Violet SSS/Datsun 710 SSS/Datsun 160J SSS (P710/P711)1973–1977
- Datsun 160Z (B210), specific to the South African market where it was assembled.
- Nissan Skyline (C210), offered in the 1600TI model. Replaced by the Z16 in late 1978.

Note the L in PL was for left hand drive models.

=== L16E ===
The L16E was fuel injected version of L16, components provided by Bosch. It was available only in Japan; in brochures it is rated 10 horsepower more than the L16T engine.

Applications:

- Nissan Bluebird SSS-E (610)1971–1976
- Nissan Violet SSS-E (P710/P711)1973–1977
- Nissan Stanza (A10/A11)1977–1981

=== L16P ===
The L16P is the LPG version of the L16.

Applications:

- Nissan Bluebird (510)
- Nissan Violet (710)

=== L18 ===
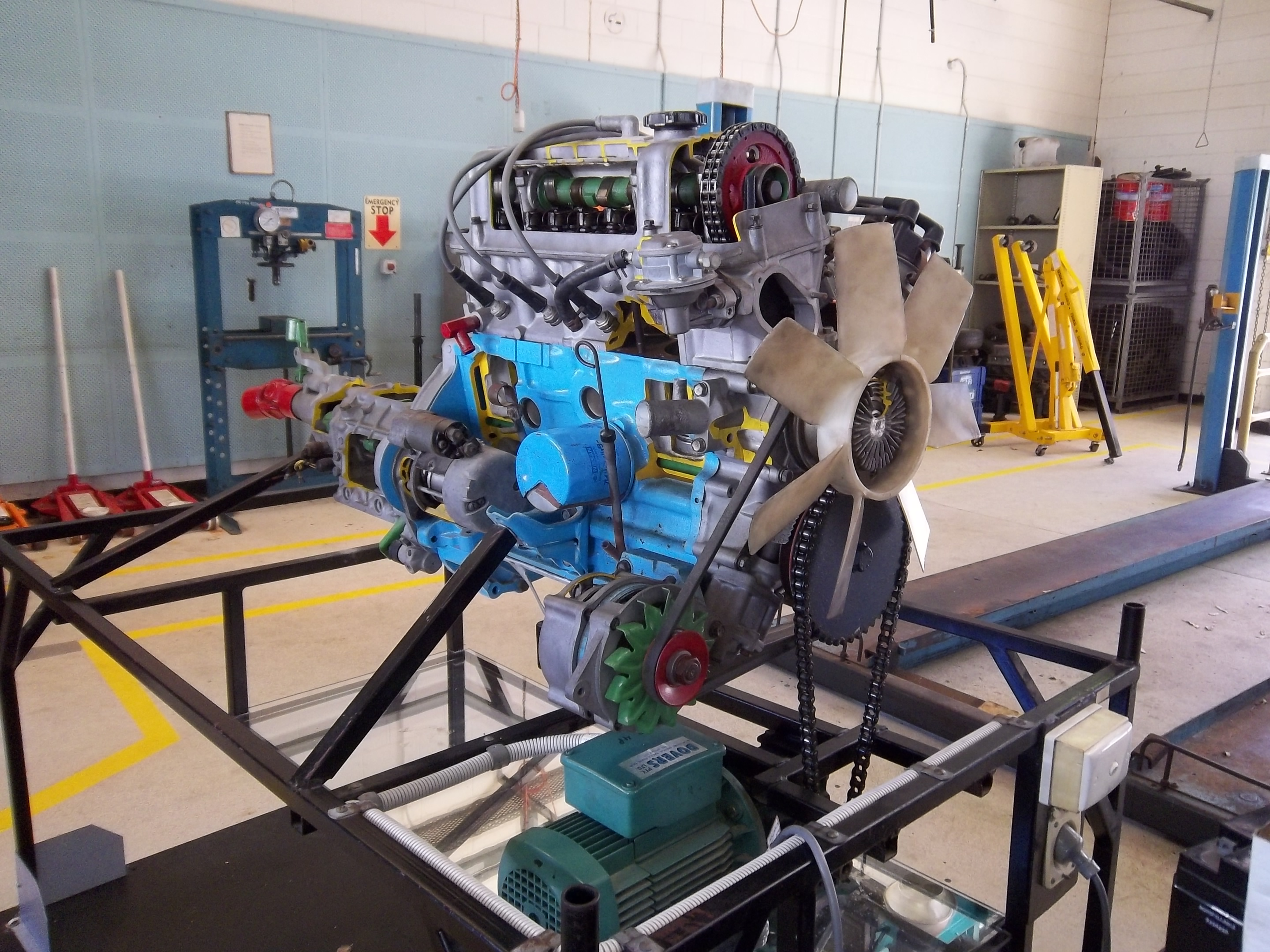
Cutaway of an L18 engine

The L18 was a 1.8 L (1,770 cc; 108.0 cu in) with a bore and stroke of 85 mm × 78 mm (3.35 in × 3.07 in) engine produced from 1972 through 1976. It produces 105 PS (77 kW; 104 hp) at 5,000 rpm in the most common trim. The L18 replaced the Prince G-18 in 1975. All variants used the same camshaft lobe lift. The L18 was a popular powerplant in many non-USA markets due to its under-2-liters displacement, which made it exempt from many fuel and classification tariffs.

Applications:
- 1971–1976 Nissan Bluebird/Datsun 180B
- 1973 Nissan Bluebird/Datsun 1600 SSS (P510)
- 1973 Datsun 610
- 1974 Datsun 620 truck
- 1974 Datsun 710
- 1979–1981 Nissan Silvia/Datsun 180SX (S110)
- 1980–1986 Datsun 720 (Middle East)
- Datsun 810

=== L18S ===
The L18S was an 1.8 L (1,770 cc; 108.0 cu in) engine that was used in the 910 Bluebird and S10 Silvia.

Applications:

- 1979 Nissan Bluebird (910)
- 1975–1979 Nissan Silvia/Datsun 180SX (S10)

=== L18E ===
The L18E was a 1.8 L (1,770 cc; 108.0 cu in) engine that was used in the S11 Silvia. The L18E is an upgraded version of the L18S, but with electronic fuel injection rather than a carburetor. It produces 115 PS (85 kW; 113 hp) at 6,200 rpm. The L18E was added in the S11 Silvia's 1976 upgrade for the "Type-LSE" trim level.

Applications:

- 1976–1979 Nissan Silvia/Datsun 180SX (S10)
- 1980–1983 Datsun 180SX (S110) (Europe)

=== L18T ===
The L18T was basically the same as the L18 but had twin SU carbs, higher compression pistons, and lower volume combustion chambers. A high lift cam, 2 mm (0.079 in) bigger inlet valves and 1 mm (0.039 in) bigger exhaust valves were also fitted. It was installed into the 610-series Bluebird 180B SSS and UK market 910 Bluebird 1.8 GL coupé. It produces 110 PS (81 kW). Also used in the Bluebird SSS Hardtop Coupé (910) for General LHD markets.

=== L18P ===
The L18P is the LPG version of the L18 engine; it was mainly installed in cars intended for taxi use.

Applications:

- Datsun Bluebird (810)
- Datsun Violet 710

=== L20B ===
The L20B is a 2.0 L (1,952 cc; 119.1 cu in) with a bore and stroke of 85 mm × 86 mm (3.35 in × 3.39 in) engine produced from 1974 through 1985. In US spec, it produces 110 hp (82 kW) in 1974–75 form with 112 lb⋅ft (152 N⋅m) of torque as installed in the Datsun 610 and 97 hp (72 kW) in 1977 –78 form with 102 lb⋅ft (138 N⋅m) of torque as installed in the 200SX. The L20B engine introduced larger-diameter 60 mm (2.4 in) main bearings while retaining a fully counterweighted crankshaft. The forged U60 crankshaft also ushered in the use of a six-bolt flywheel boss. The block introduced a taller deck height to accommodate the longer stroke and connecting rods. This specification would also be used later in the Z20 and Z22 engines. The bigger powerplant even helped spawn an important new offering from Datsun's competition department 50 mm (2.0 in) Solex twin-choke carburetor kits- complete fuel systems that help produce nearly double the power from the ubiquitous L20B. The legendary robustness and nearly square configuration have made this engine a popular choice among tuners for turbocharging.

The engine used a carburetor but switched to fuel injection (and round instead of square exhaust ports) in some non-USA markets in 1977. Carburetors were used in all US L20B applications for both cars and trucks. In the US, the L20B was used in six different model families -A10, 610, 710, S10, 620, and 720 models- making it the most versatile powerplant in the company's US history. To avoid confusion with the six-cylinder L20, Nissan designated this engine the L20B.

Applications:
- 1974–1976 Datsun 610
- 1975–1977 Datsun 710
- 1975–1979 Datsun 620 110 hp (82 kW)
- 1975–1979 Datsun 200SX (S10)
- 1977–1981 Datsun 200B
- 1978–1981 Datsun 510 (HA10)
- 1979.5–1980 Datsun 720
- 1981 –198? Nissan/Datsun Skyline R30 (South Africa)

=== LD20/LD20T ===
There was also a diesel version of the four-cylinder L-series, used in models including the Bluebird 910 and the Vanette. It was not installed in the 720 pickup (which has the SD22/25 when diesel powered) although the gas versions most often has the L-series engine. However, in case of a conversion of a gas powered 720 to diesel, it will be much easier to use a LD20 because it fits on the original gearbox and engine mounts.) The N/A version produced 65 PS (48 kW) at 4600 rpm and 12.5 kg⋅m (123 N⋅m; 90 lb⋅ft) of torque at 2400 rpm, later 67 PS (49 kW) and 13 kg⋅m (127 N⋅m; 94 lb⋅ft) of torque. The turbo version has 79 PS (58 kW) at 4400 rpm and 17 kg⋅m (167 N⋅m; 123 lb⋅ft) of torque at 2400 rpm.

LD20

- 1,952 cc (2.0 L) diesel engine pre-combustion chamber

65 PS (48 kW; 64 hp) at 4600 rpm and 12.5 kg⋅m (123 N⋅m; 90 lb⋅ft) of torque at 2400 rpm

Models:

- Vanette (C120)
- Vanette Largo (GC120)

LD20 II

Introduced in 1986, the LD20 II has a differently shaped combustion chamber. The camshaft is driven by a timing belt instead of a chain as in the LD20. 67 PS (49 kW; 66 hp) at 4600 rpm and 13 kg⋅m (127 N⋅m; 94 lb⋅ft) of torque at 2400 rpm

Models:

- Bluebird (910 and U11)
- Vanette (C22)
- Vanette (GC22; export markets)
- Ebro/Nissan Trade

LD20T/LD20T II

79 PS (58 kW; 78 hp) at 4400 rpm and 17 kg⋅m (167 N⋅m; 123 lb⋅ft) of torque at 2400 rpm (LD20T II)

Models:

- Bluebird (U11)
- Vanette Largo (GC120 & GC22)
- Homy / Caravan (E23 & E24)

=== LZ (competition) ===
The "LZ" twin cam head was designed to give a power boost to the Datsun L series engines. It was built purely for Datsun/Nissan competition use. Engine size can vary between 1400 cc (LZ14) in the PB110 "1200", 1600 cc in the PB210, 1800 CC in the 710 2.0 litres in the PA10 Stanza, to 2.2 liter in the 910 bluebird rally cars. The naturally aspirated LZ engines used 44 or 50 mm (1.73 or 1.97 in) Solex carburettors depending on capacity. The LZ engine found its way into many categories, from "Datsun Works" rally cars, Formula Pacific, Group 4 (racing), Group 5 (racing) and Group C.

The LZ engine uses a standard L series engine block but mounted with a DOHC cylinder head. It uses four valves per cylinder instead of two valves for a total of 16 valves. Usually the bottom end is dry sumped using a Tsubakimoto dry sump pump. The crankshaft used is a Nismo chrome moly "8 bolt flywheel" type. Connecting rods are of various length (Cosworth style) to suit the engine stroke. The rod caps have aircraft grade rod bolts and are dowelled. Pistons are thin ring forged units.

There are two different LZ cylinder heads. The early head is the same thickness as a normal L series head. The engine using the first head was simply named as the L14 twin cam with no mention of the "Z" in the name. This L14 twin cam head engine has flat exit side exhaust ports, the early 12 bolt rocker cover and the coolant discharge on the inlet side of the head. All early twin cam engines appear to have the 14 bolt rocker cover (6 for the cover and 8 for the bolt-in plug holders). Later engines (with the LZ14 designation) use the full flat cover with six bolts to secure it.

The head was available for purchase from Nissan (Nismo) and was sanctioned by the FIA. The LZ14 1.6 L (1,598 cc; 97.5 cu in) was used during the 1973 Japanese GP, taking the top three positions. In open wheeler "Formula Pacific" racing the LZ14 engine dominated competition in most events it was entered in. It received multiple top rankings in some events.

The LZ14 is naturally aspirated and has a bore and stroke of 87.8 mm × 66 mm (3.46 in × 2.60 in) 1.6 L (1,598 cc; 97.5 cu in). For qualifying and non endurance events the LZ14 can be tweaked to produce 240 PS (177 kW; 237 hp) at 11,000 rpm. The LZ14 engine used in "Formula Pacific" race cars produces 205 PS (151 kW; 202 hp) at 10,200 rpm.

In some Japanese racing classes the LZ engine is fitted with low compression pistons and a "T05B" turbocharger. These engines are electronically fuel injected instead of carburetted. The LZ turbo engine was tuned to produce 570 PS (419 kW; 562 hp) at 7,600 rpm and 539 N⋅m (398 lbf⋅ft) at 6,400 rpm. A very successful example of the LZ turbo was in the famous Japanese "White Lightning" Silvia and "Tomica" R30 Skyline, both driven by Hoshino in the mid–1980s. The LZ turbo engine was also used in the 1986 Nissan March 85G Le Mans car. The original LZ20B turbo engine used in the 1983 Nissan Silvia (S12) "White Lightning" Group 5 race car, produced 500 PS (368 kW; 493 hp) at 8,000 rpm.

=== Aftermarket DOHC heads for the four-cylinder L-series ===
The four-cylinder L-series engines have no official production twin-cam DOHC versions made; only the LZ engine made for competition purposes was produced as the only L-series based DOHC inline-four cylinder engine produced. However, there are aftermarket modifications to the four-cylinder L-series engines that utilized DOHC heads.

==== 16-valve DOHC head by OS Giken ====
In 1974, Osamu Okazaki designed a dual overhead cam, 16-valve cylinder head as an upgrade to the four-cylinder variant of the L-series engines, manufacturing it via his automotive performance company, OS Giken. This cylinder head also significantly improved the performance of the engine by using a more modern crossflow cylinder head design rather than the reverse flow design of the original. The naturally aspirated version of the engine with the OS Giken DOHC head produced 230 hp (170 kW; 230 PS).

== Straight-six ==
=== L20/L20A ===
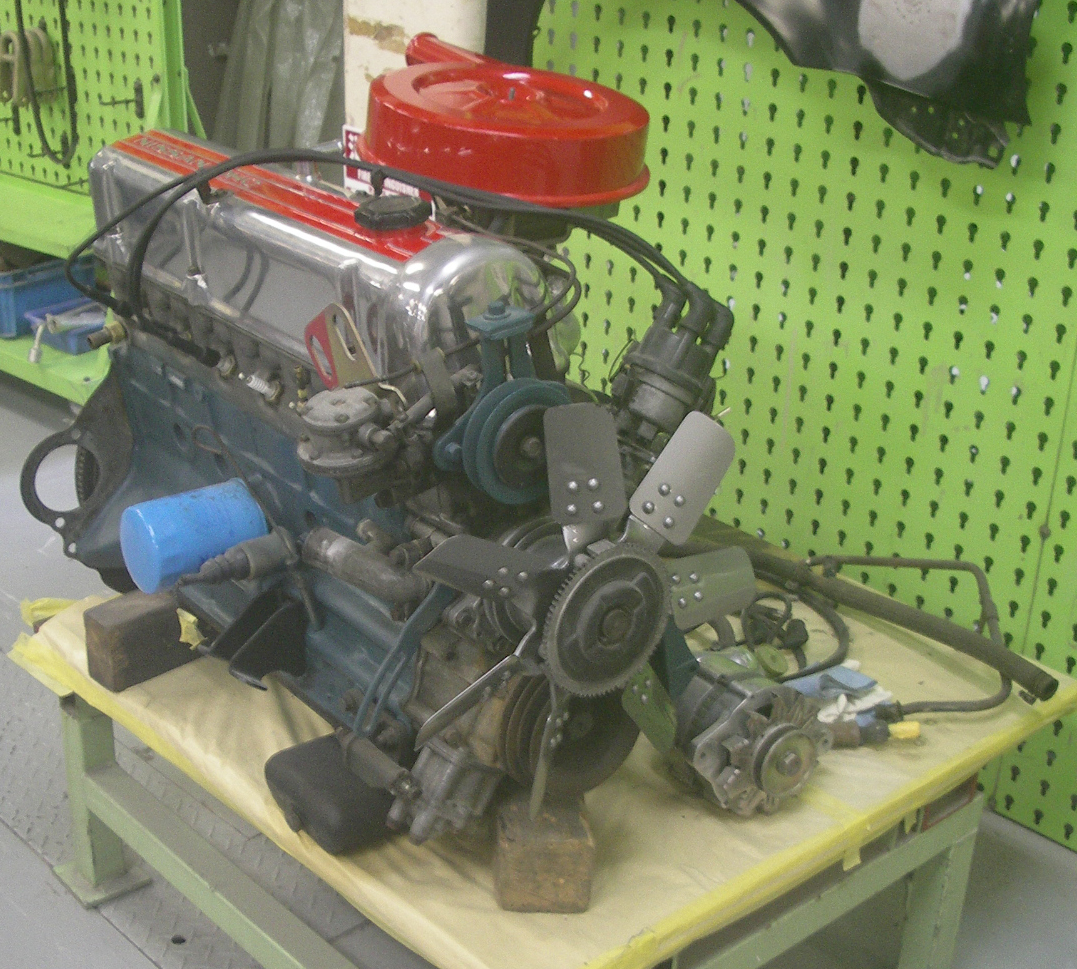
Nissan L20 engine

The L20 is a SOHC 12-valve engine produced from 1966. A bore and stroke of 78 mm × 69.7 mm (3.07 in × 2.74 in) meant a displacement of 2.0 L (1,998 cc; 121.9 cu in). It was used in the Nissan Skyline 2000 GT and Nissan Cedric 130, producing 109 hp (81 kW) for the 2000 GT and 123 hp (92 kW) for the Cedric. This engine was plagued by problems caused by its rushed development and was short lived, with the engine being discontinued two years later.

A new L20, designated L20A, was introduced in 1970 to replace the original L20 and was based on the design of the L16. It used the same bore and stroke as the original L20 and produces 115 PS (85 kW). It was used in HLC210 (Nissan Laurel/Datsun 200L, 75 –77), G610 Bluebird U 2000 GT and GTX, 230/330 Series Cedrics, HIJC31 (Laurel, 81 –85), and Fairlady Z (1970–1983).

There was also the fuel injected L20E, which produced 130 PS (96 kW).

=== L20ET ===
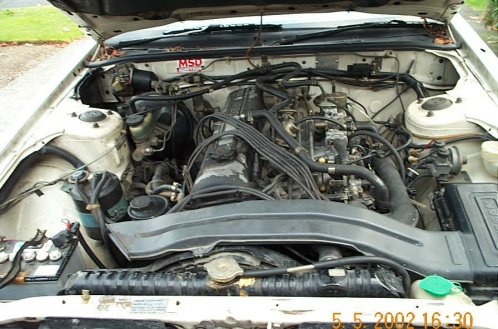
L20ET engine in an R30 Skyline

The L20ET is a turbo engine developed from the L20E. It was the first engine out of Japan to ever receive a turbo. It was released in the late 1970s and fitted to the Skyline C210 and R30, Laurel, Leopard, Cedric, Gloria, and early Fairlady Z lines of automobiles. It is a 12-valve, six-cylinder, fuel-injected engine with a single chain driven cam, turbo (non intercooled), and a non crossflow head. It produces 145 PS (107 kW; 143 hp).

=== L20P ===
The L20P is the LPG version of the L20 engine.

Applications:

- Nissan Cedric (330, 430 and Y30)
- Nissan Gloria (330, 430 and Y30)

=== L23 ===
The L23 was a 2.3 L (2,262 cc; 138.0 cu in) engine produced in 1968. It produces 123 hp (92 kW). This engine was produced in limited numbers and was replaced by the L24 the following year. Bore and stroke were 83 mm × 69.7 mm (3.27 in × 2.74 in). The L23 was based on the design of the original L20.

Applications:

- 1968-69 Nissan Cedric Personal Six, Special Six and Super Six

=== L24 ===
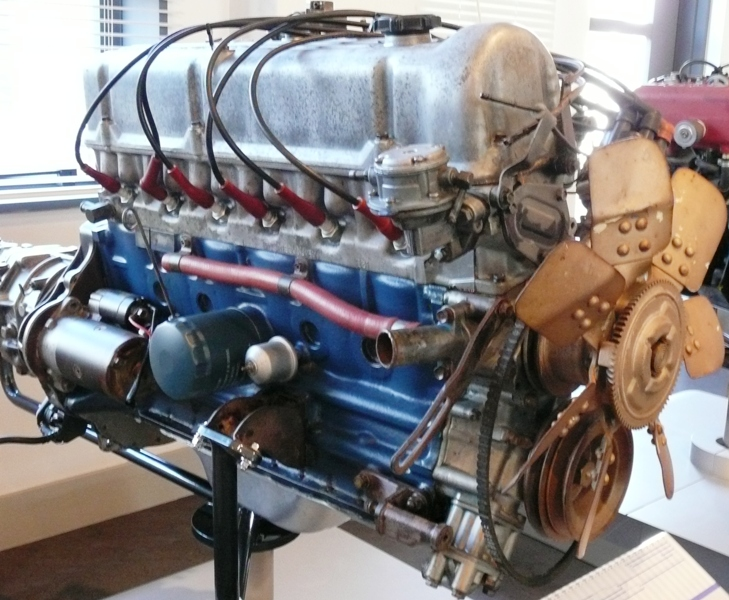
Nissan L24 engine

The L24 was a 2.4 L (2,393 cc; 146.0 cu in) engine produced from 1969 through 1984. Like the L20A, it was based on the design of the L16. It produces 130 PS (128 bhp; 96 kW) and the version with twin side draught SU Carburettors produces 150 PS (148 bhp; 110 kW). Bore and stroke is 83 mm × 73.7 mm (3.27 in × 2.90 in).

A single carburetor version of the same engine was also standard in the Laurel sedan (240L) for various export markets, in the years 1982 –1984. While the last generation Cedric to use this engine in Japan was the 230-series (1971–1975), Yue Loong of Taiwan installed it in 430-series Cedrics at least as late as 1984.

Applications:
- 1970–1973 Datsun 240Z—150 PS (148 bhp; 110 kW)
- 1970–1971 Nissan Cedric/Gloria 130
- 1970–1972 Nissan Skyline 2400GT (C10)
- 1971–1972 Nissan Cedric/Gloria 230
- 1972–1977 Datsun 240K (C110)
- 1978–1981 Datsun 240K-GT (C210)
- 1979–1980 Nissan Laurel C230
- 1980–1984 Nissan Laurel C31 (export)

=== L24E ===
Electronic fuel injection was added for the L24E, produced from 1977 through 1986. It produces 138 hp (103 kW; 140 PS) and 180 N⋅m (133 lb⋅ft) of torque. This engine was used in export market cars only and was never sold in Japan.

Applications:
- 1977–1980 Datsun 810
- 1981 Datsun 810
- 1981–1985 Nissan Skyline R30
- 1982–1983 Datsun Maxima
- 1984 Nissan Maxima
- 1984–1990 Nissan Laurel C32

=== L26 ===
The L26 is the larger 2.6 L (2,565 cc; 156.5 cu in). Bore and stroke is 83 mm × 79 mm (3.27 in × 3.11 in). It was produced from 1973 through 1978. It produces 140–162 PS (138–160 bhp; 103–119 kW). In 1975, the L26 replaced the Prince G-20. The L26 makes around 165 bhp (167 PS; 123 kW).

Applications:

- 1972–1975 Nissan Cedric (230 Series)
- 1974–1977 Nissan Laurel (C130)
- 1974 Datsun 260Z 1974 for North America. 260Z sold in other countries until 1978
- 1976–1978 Nissan Cedric (330 Series)

=== L28 ===
The L28 is a 2.8 L (2,753 cc; 168.0 cu in) 12-valve engine. Bore and stroke is 86 mm × 79 mm (3.39 in × 3.11 in). The basic L28 is carbureted. As fitted to the 160-series Nissan Patrol, the L28 produces 120 PS (88 kW) at 4800 rpm and has a torque of 201 N⋅m (148 lb⋅ft) at 3,200 rpm.

Applications:

- 1975–1977 Nissan Laurel C130
- 1977–1979 Nissan Gloria 330
- 1978 Dome Zero
- 1978–1979 Nissan Cedric 330
- 1980–1989 Nissan Patrol 160
- 1982–1987 Datsun/Nissan Skyline R30 (South Africa)
- 1986–2002 Nissan Patrol 260

=== L28E ===
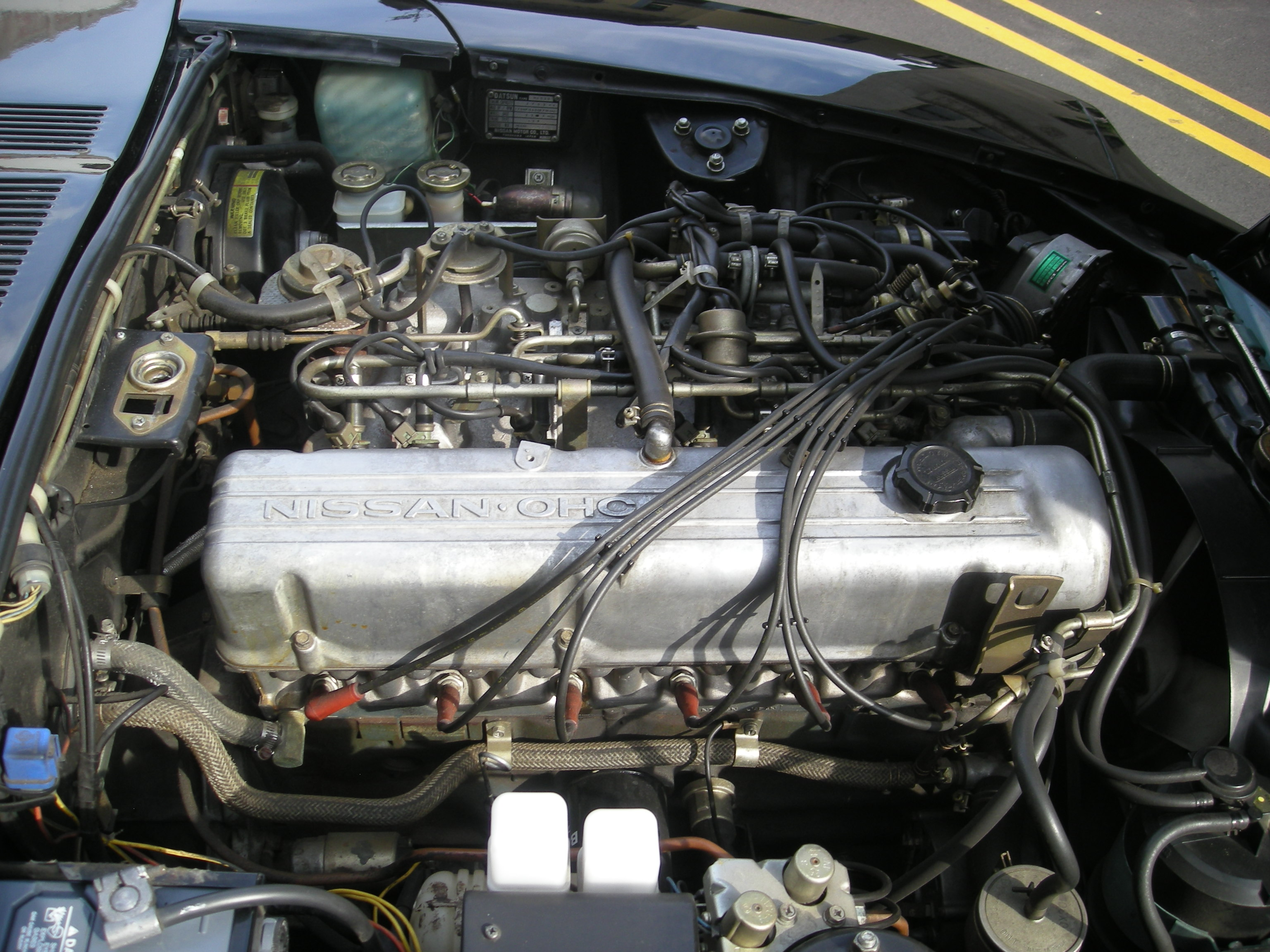
Nissan L28E engine in a Datsun 280Z

The L28E is the enlarged 2.8 L (2,753 cc; 168.0 cu in) engine produced from 1975 to 1984 equipped with dish-top pistons from 1975 to 1978 and 1979 to 1983 with flat top pistons and a resulting compression ratio of 8.3:1. The E stands for electronic multiport fuel injection, provided by Bosch using the L-Jetronic system, and is one of the first Japanese produced vehicles to introduce the technology. For model year 1981 through model year 1983, the L28E received flat-top pistons and a high quench head, raising the compression ratio to 8.8:1, and thus increasing the power rating from 135 PS (99 kW; 133 hp) (1975–1980) to 145 PS (107 kW; 143 hp) (1981–1983).

Applications:
- 1975–1978 Datsun 280Z (150 PS (110 kW; 148 hp))
- 1975–1986 Dome Zero
- 1979–1983 Datsun 280ZX
- 1980–1982 Nissan Leopard F30
- 1980–1989 Nissan Patrol 160
- Nissan Cedric
- Nissan Gloria
- Nissan AD-2 concept

=== L28ET ===
The L28E was turbocharged in December 1980 to produce the L28ET for the 280ZX Turbo. The L28ET was produced through June 1983. The early versions had adjustable mechanical rockers though these were phased out after September 1982 in favor of hydraulic rockers. The L28ET produces 180 bhp (182 PS; 134 kW) at 5,600 rpm and 203 lb⋅ft (275 N⋅m) of torque at 2800 rpm. This engine was considered too powerful by Japan's Ministry of Transportation, who would only allow turbochargers to be installed in sub 2 litre-engined cars, and was therefore never sold in its homeland.

The L28ET used a single Garrett AiResearch TB03 internally wastegated turbocharger and no intercooler. Boost was limited to 6.8 psi (0.47 bar). Other modest changes were made to the turbo model, with static compression reduced to 7.4:1, and automatic transmission models were given a higher-volume oil pump. The most significant change aside from the turbocharger itself was the introduction of a new engine control system, Nissan's Electronic Concentrated Control System (ECCS).

Applications:

- Datsun 280ZX Turbo

=== LD28 ===
The LD28 is the diesel-version of the L28 engine. Robust 7-main bearing block design, like all L-series six-cylinder engines. Bore and stroke are 84.5 mm × 83 mm (3.33 in × 3.27 in) respectively.

- LD28
- 2.8 L (2,792 cc; 170.4 cu in)
- pre-combustion chamber

Power outputs: 91 PS (67 kW; 90 bhp) at 4,600 rpm and 17.3 kg⋅m (170 N⋅m; 125 lbf⋅ft) of torque at 2,400 rpm

Applications:

- Nissan Gloria 430 and Y30 (1980 - 1985)
- Nissan Cedric 430 and Y30
- Nissan Laurel C31 and C32 (1980 - 1987)
- Nissan Skyline C210 and R30
- Datsun 810 G910 (1980 - 1981)
- Datsun Maxima G910 (1981 - 1983)
- Albin 27 boats from 1982 to 1992/3

=== LD28T (turbocharged) ===
A turbocharged version of the LD28 diesel engine. It is only found in Japan, Australasia/New Zealand, southern Africa and parts of Europe. There are no factory turbocharged LD28 engines available in the US market, nor has Nissan ever equipped any of its US-market cars/light trucks with a turbo-diesel engine.

Nissan also marketed LD28Ts as bare engines for genset and stationary engine uses and may be also found in maritime version.

Applications:

- Nissan Patrol (Y60 & Y61 Safari export version)
- Nissan Laurel (Euro only)

=== Aftermarket DOHC heads for the straight-six L-series ===
The six-cylinder L-series engines have no official production twin-cam DOHC versions made; an equivalent DOHC inline-six cylinder engine produced around the same time period was the S20 engine. However, there are aftermarket modifications to the straight-six L-series engines that utilized DOHC heads.

==== 24-valve DOHC head by OS Giken ====
Shortly after producing the 16-valve version of the DOHC cylinder heads for the four-cylinder version of the L-series engines, Osamu Okazaki also released a 24-valve version of the DOHC cylinder head for the six-cylinder version of the L-series engines, again manufactured by his company OS Giken. Known as the TC24-B1, these engines produced 320 PS (235 kW) in naturally aspirated form with a maximum redline of 9,000 rpm. Very few of these original TC24-B1 engines exist.

In 2013, a redesigned version of the 24-valve DOHC cylinder head by OS Giken was released. As stated by Osamu Okazaki, he redesigned every component with more modern technology and materials, and includes revisions such as switching the chain driven timing system into a gear driven one, the option of fuel injection and a coil pack ignition system alongside carburetors, and improved valvetrain and bottom end components that are better suited for higher RPM speeds. This iteration produces 420 hp (310 kW; 430 PS) in naturally aspirated form and has a maximum redline of 10,000 rpm.

==== Other aftermarket 24-valve DOHC heads ====
In recent years, several other aftermarket DOHC heads for the L-series engines have emerged. Derek Minetti, founder of Datsunworks in Florida, has designed a DOHC head based on the straight-four Honda K20 engine, utilizing factory K20 components in the valvetrain. The head, however, is a bespoke design.

In 2024, Nismo released a one-off DOHC head of their own design for the L-series. Named the "TLX", it uses coil pack ignition, fuel injection, and individual throttle bodies, is said to have a bore and stroke of 89 mm × 79 mm (3.50 in × 3.11 in) with a 2.9 L (2,949 cc) displacement, and will produce horsepower figures in the 300 hp (224 kW; 304 PS) range with a redline of 7,500 rpm. On June 19, 2025, Nismo announced production of the TLX, being manufactured under Nissan's Nismo Motorsports & Customization Co., Ltd (abbreviated to NMC) division and noting its availability for purchase in the fall.

In 2025, Pams Labo showcased their LZ6 engine at Tokyo Auto Salon in collaboration with actor Sung Kang and Veilside for their Veilside '73 project. It was displayed alongside Sung Kang's S30 Fairlady Z during the event. The LZ6 engine has its origins with the LZ engine, a specially-developed engine based on the straight-four L-series engines designed exclusively for competitive use, which utilizes a unique twin-cam head. Pams had planned to design a similar twin-cam head based on the LZ twin-cam head but never came to fruition, however Ken Yoshioka, the current owner of the company, has collaborated with JMC to develop the LZ6 head with guidance from the original designer of the LZ twin-cam head, Yoshimasa Hayashi. It uses a gear driven timing system instead of a chain driven one, with a displacement of 3.1 L. Bore and stroke is 89 mm × 84 mm (3.50 in × 3.31 in), and produces over 400 hp (298 kW; 406 PS) with a redline of 9,500 rpm.

==== RBL cylinder head modification ====
The RBL engine is a unique modification of the L-series engines that combines an RB-series DOHC head with an L-series block. These engines required extensive modifications in order to achieve desirable results, such as modifying oil and coolant passages to support the new design and reworking the RB-series cylinder head to use a chain driven timing system. Allegedly, they are said to be rated at around 300 hp (224 kW; 304 PS) to 400 hp (298 kW; 406 PS) with a 9,000 rpm redline.

The YouTube channel Vintage Garage has published videos dedicated to the RBL engines, with channel owner spark88 developing a blog dedicated to the RBL engines where more information on the RBL twin-cam head modifications can be found. Only a handful of RBL engines have been made.

== See also ==
- List of Nissan engines
