= Prince Skyway =

Motor vehicle

The Prince Skyway was a commercial delivery van and coupe utility produced by the Prince Motor Company from 1957 to 1967. It was based on the various Prince Skyline models of the period.

In 1966, after the merger with Nissan, the V51A Skyway was renamed as "Skyline Van".

Prince Skyway models included the following:

- ALVG-1 Van - based on the 1957 Prince Skyline ALSI-1 Series
- ALPE-1 Pickup - based on the 1957 Prince Skyline ALSI-1 Series
- ALVG-2 Van - based on the 1959 Prince Skyline ALSI-2
- ALPE-2 Pickup - based on the 1959 Prince Skyline ALSI-2
- ALVG-2 Van - based on the 1960 Prince Skyline ALSI-2-1
- ALPE-2 Pickup - based on the 1960 Prince Skyline ALSI-2-1
- BLVG-3 Van - based on the 1961 Prince Skyline BLSI-3
- BLPE-3 Pickup - based on the 1961 Prince Skyline BLSI-3
- V23 Van - based on the 1962 Prince Skyline S21 Series
- P23 Pickup - based on the 1962 Prince Skyline S21 Series
- V51-1 Van - based on the 1963 Prince Skyline S50-1 Series
- V51A-2 Van - based on the 1965 Prince Skyline S50-2 Series

The commercial van variant of the Skyline was discontinued with the Nissan Prince Skyline S50- 3 which was introduced in August 1967.

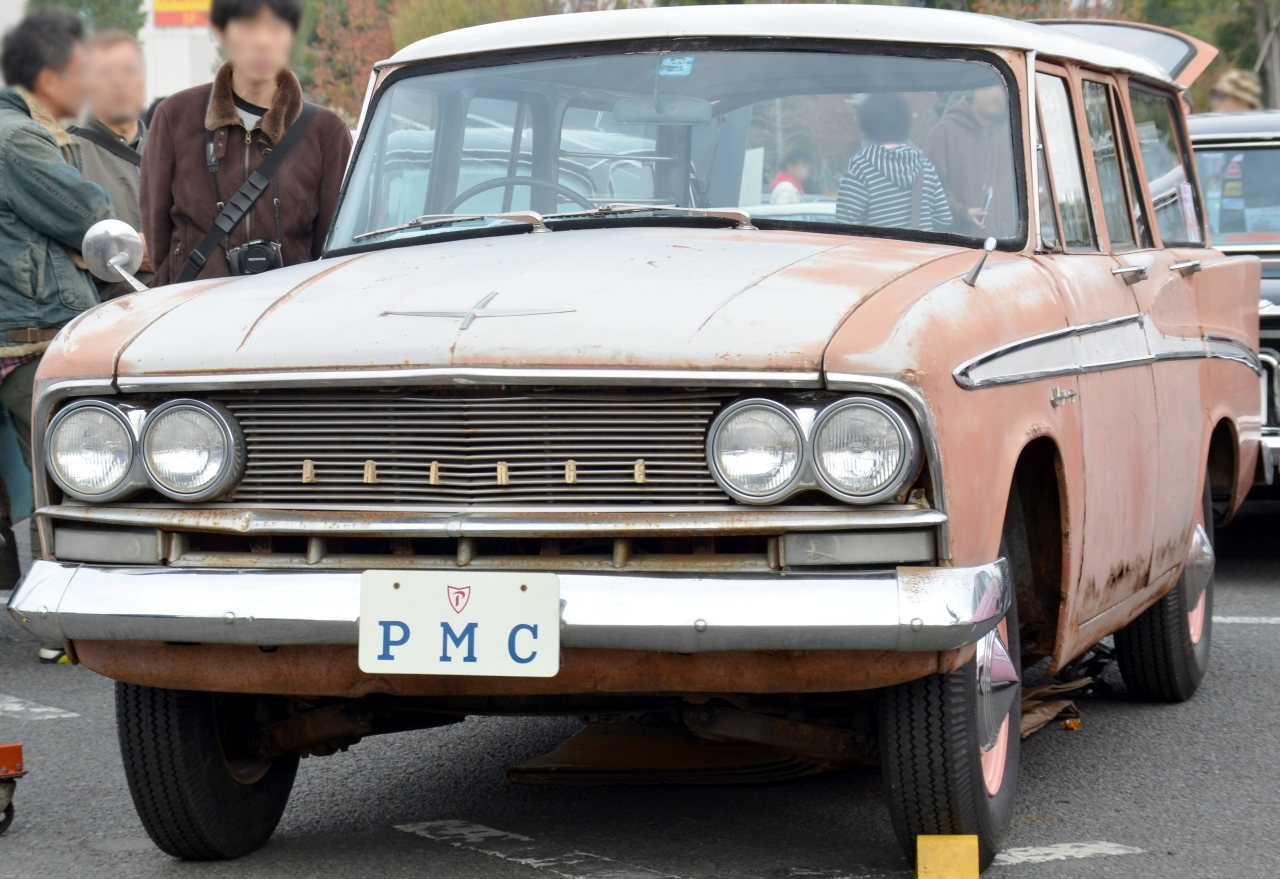
Prince Skyway V23

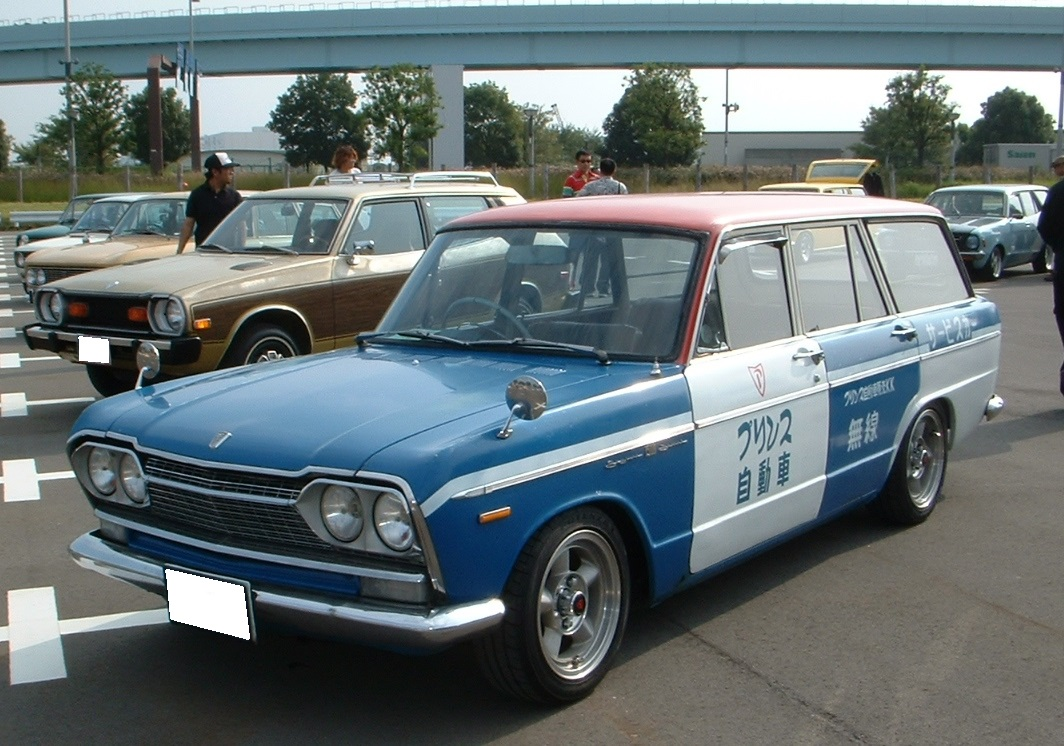
The second generation Nissan Prince Skyline 1500 Van DeLuxe V51B (formerly known as “Prince Skyway 1500” until October 1966)

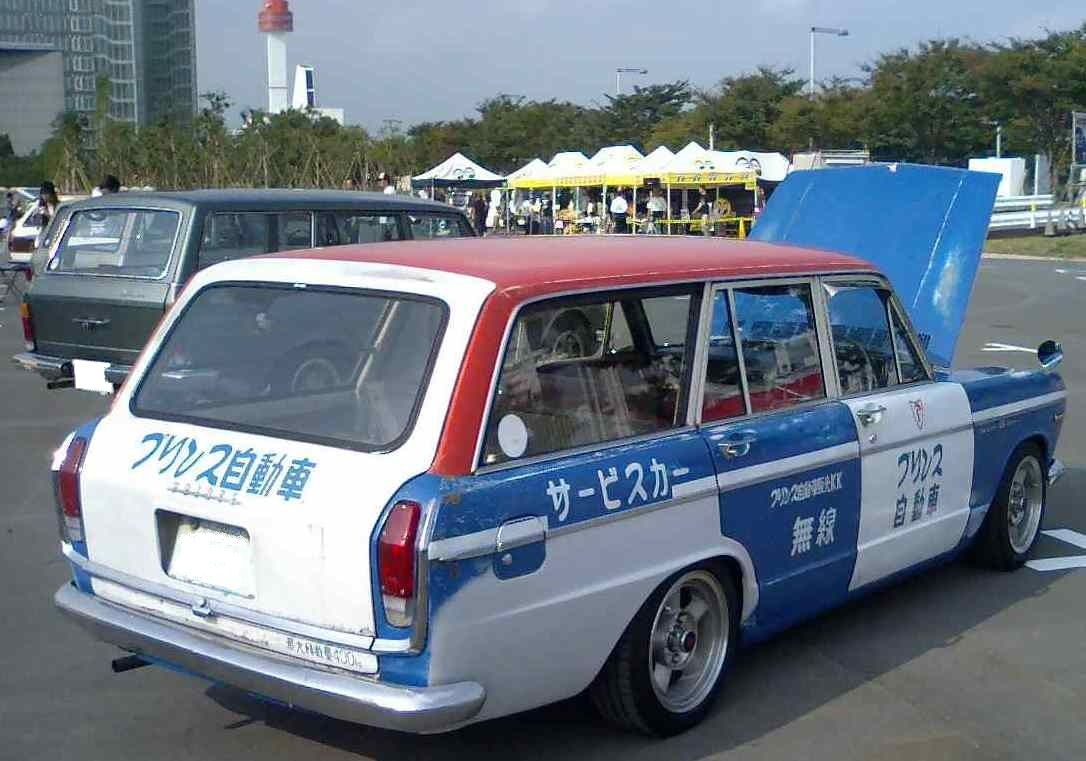
Rear view of Nissan Prince Skyline 1500 Van DeLuxe V51B
