= Nissan Cedric =

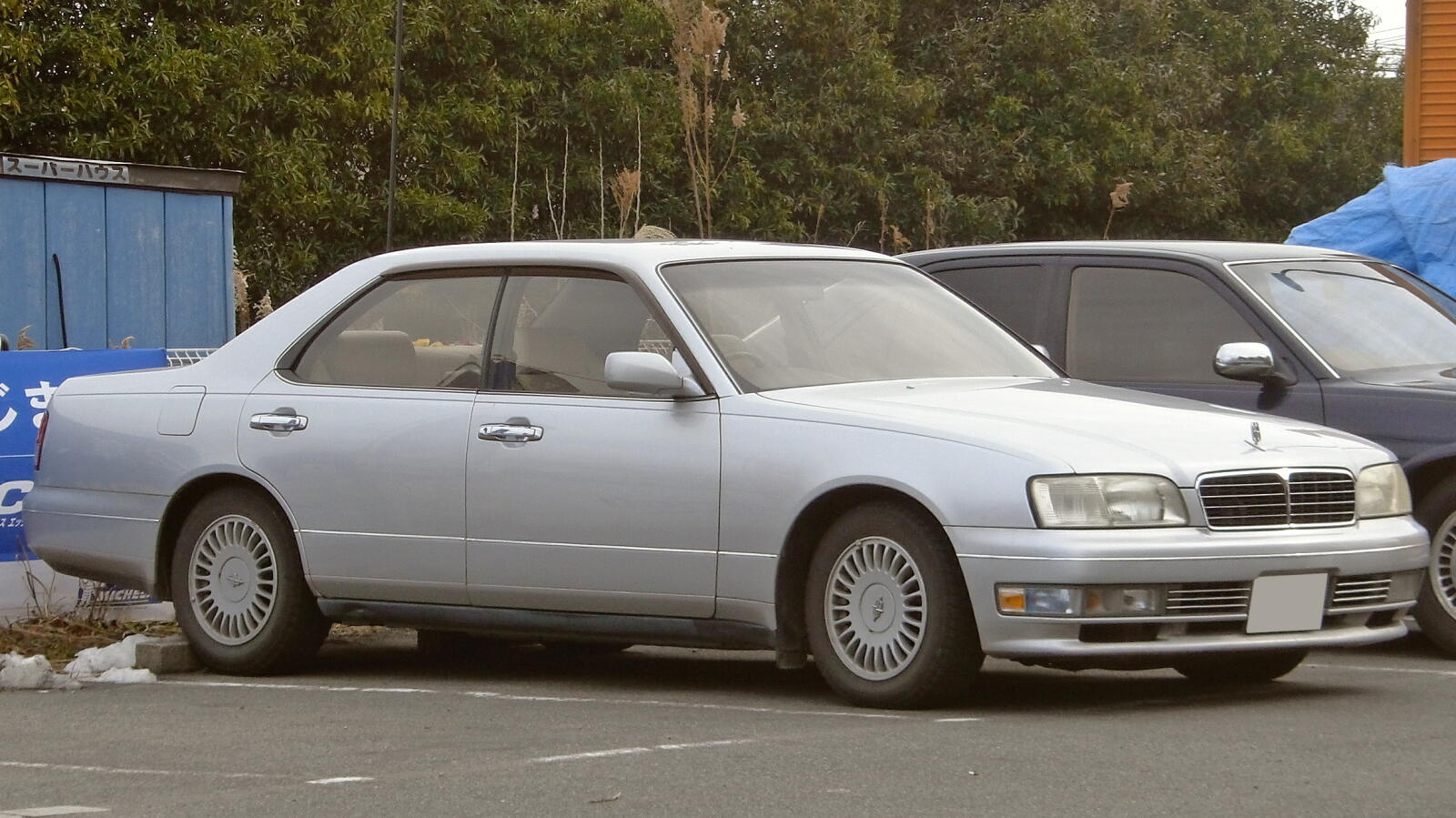
- 1995 Nissan Cedric Brougham VIP (Y33)

Overview
- Manufacturer: Nissan
- Production: 1960–2015; until 2004 for private buyers

Body and chassis
- Class: Executive car
- Body style: 2-door coupé; 4-door hardtop/sedan; 5-door wagon/van
- Related: Nissan Cima; Nissan Leopard; Nissan Crew; Nissan Gloria

Chronology
- Predecessor: Austin-Nissan A50
- Successor: Nissan Fuga

The Nissan Cedric (Japanese: 日産・セドリック, Nissan Sedorikku) is a large automobile produced by Nissan from 1960 to 2015. It was developed to provide upscale transportation, competing with the Prince Skyline and Gloria which were later merged into the Nissan family. In later years, the Nissan Skyline was positioned as a sports sedan/coupe, whereas the Nissan Gloria was turned into a sporty version of the Cedric (with identical styling but using a different radiator grille and front & rear light clusters).

In Japan, the Cedric/Gloria series was affectionately called CedGlo, and this long-running series finally came to an end in October 2004, replaced by the Nissan Fuga. The Cedric name is still in use, on the Y31 series fleet vehicle traditionally used as a taxi, where it competes with the Toyota Comfort, and is still in production. Throughout the many versions of the Cedric, it was always considered to be the prime competitor to the Toyota Crown. The hood ornament was inspired by the diamond pattern used by Lincoln but was changed to two right angles set next to each other.

The Cedric name was inspired by the main character, Cedric, in Frances Hodgson Burnett's novel Little Lord Fauntleroy by the Nissan CEO at the time Katsuji Kawamata.

== First generation (30/31; 1960) ==
Nissan Cedric 30 and 31
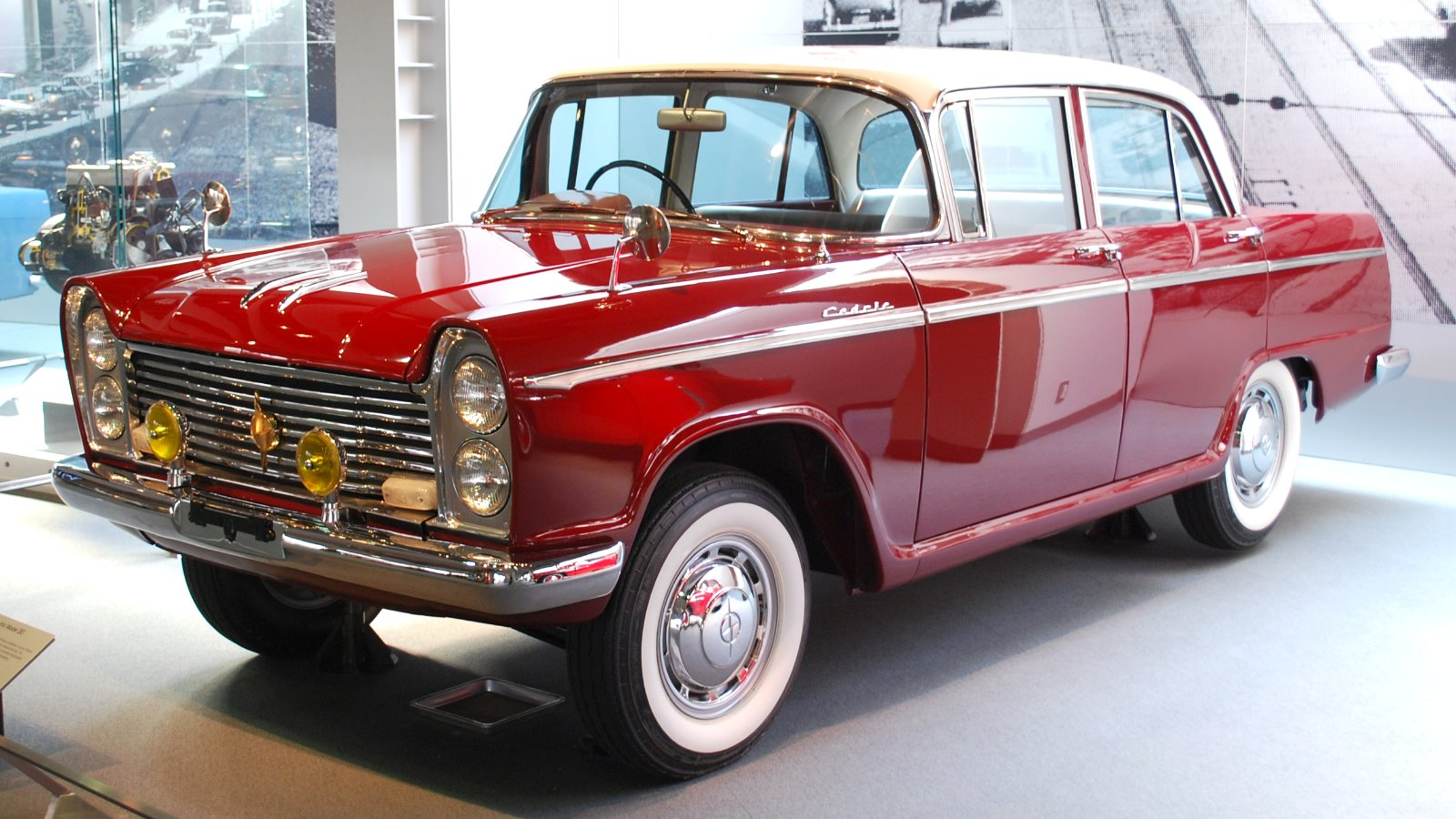
- 1960 Nissan Cedric 30

Overview
- Also called: Yue Loong YLN-801 (TW)
- Production: 1960–1962 (30); 1962–1965 (31)
- Assembly: Japan: Yokosuka, Kanagawa; Taiwan: Taipei County

Body and chassis
- Body style: 4-door sedan/wagon/van
- Layout: FR layout
- Related: Datsun Truck 320; Datsun Fairlady SP310; Datsun Bluebird 310; Nissan Silvia CSP311

Powertrain
- Engine: 1.5 L G I4; 1.9 L H I4; 2.8 L K I6 (Cedric Special); 2.0 L SD20 diesel I4 (QGS31)
- Transmission: 3-speed Borg-Warner Type 35 automatic (from 1964); 4-speed manual

Dimensions
- Wheelbase: 2,530 mm (99.6 in)
- Length: 4,410–4,590 mm (173.6–180.7 in)
- Width: 1,680 mm (66.1 in)
- Height: 1,520 mm (59.8 in)
- Curb weight: 1,195–1,290 kg (2,635–2,844 lb)

Chronology
- Successor: Nissan President (for Cedric Special)

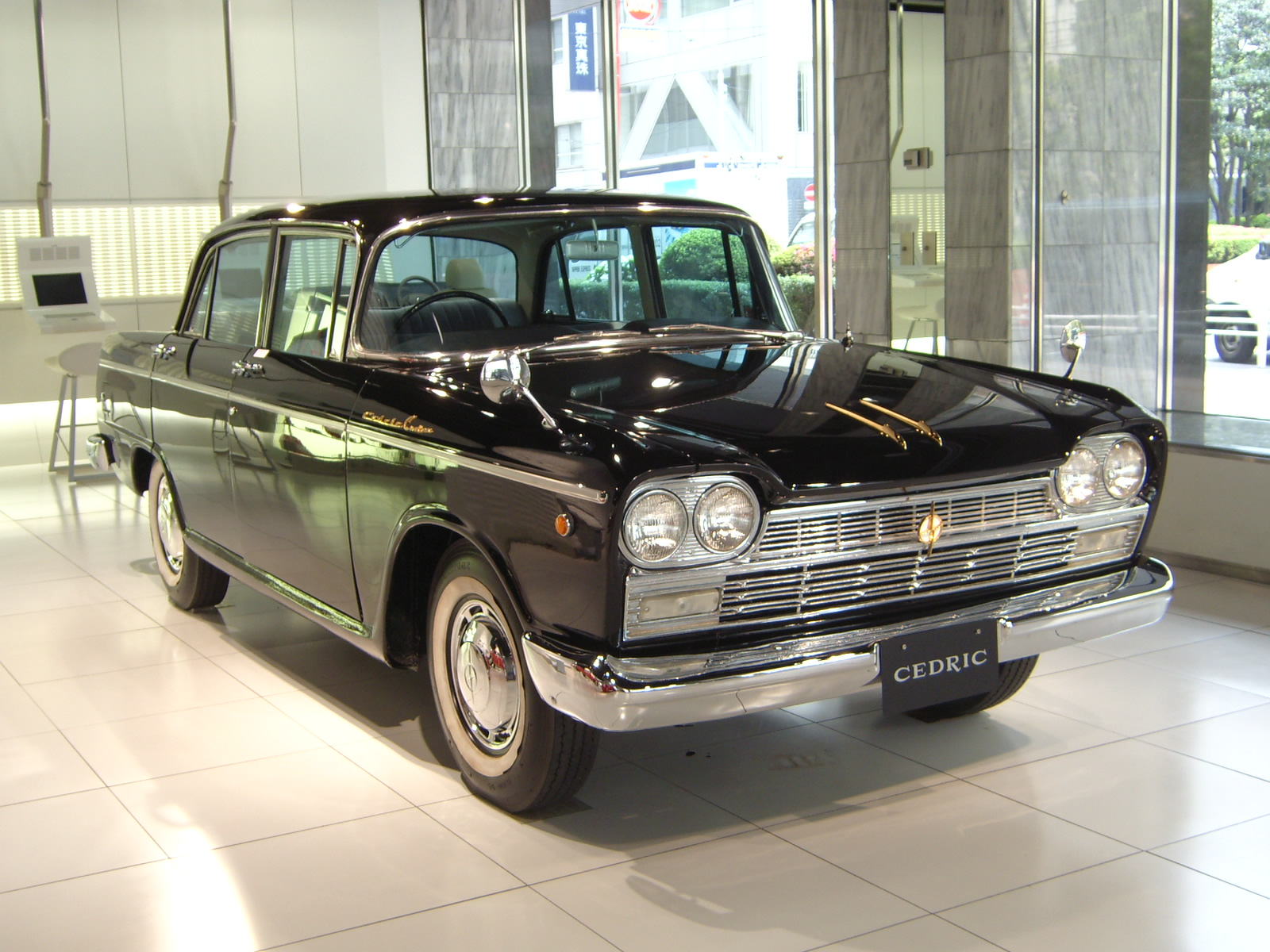
Nissan Cedric Custom 31 (facelift)

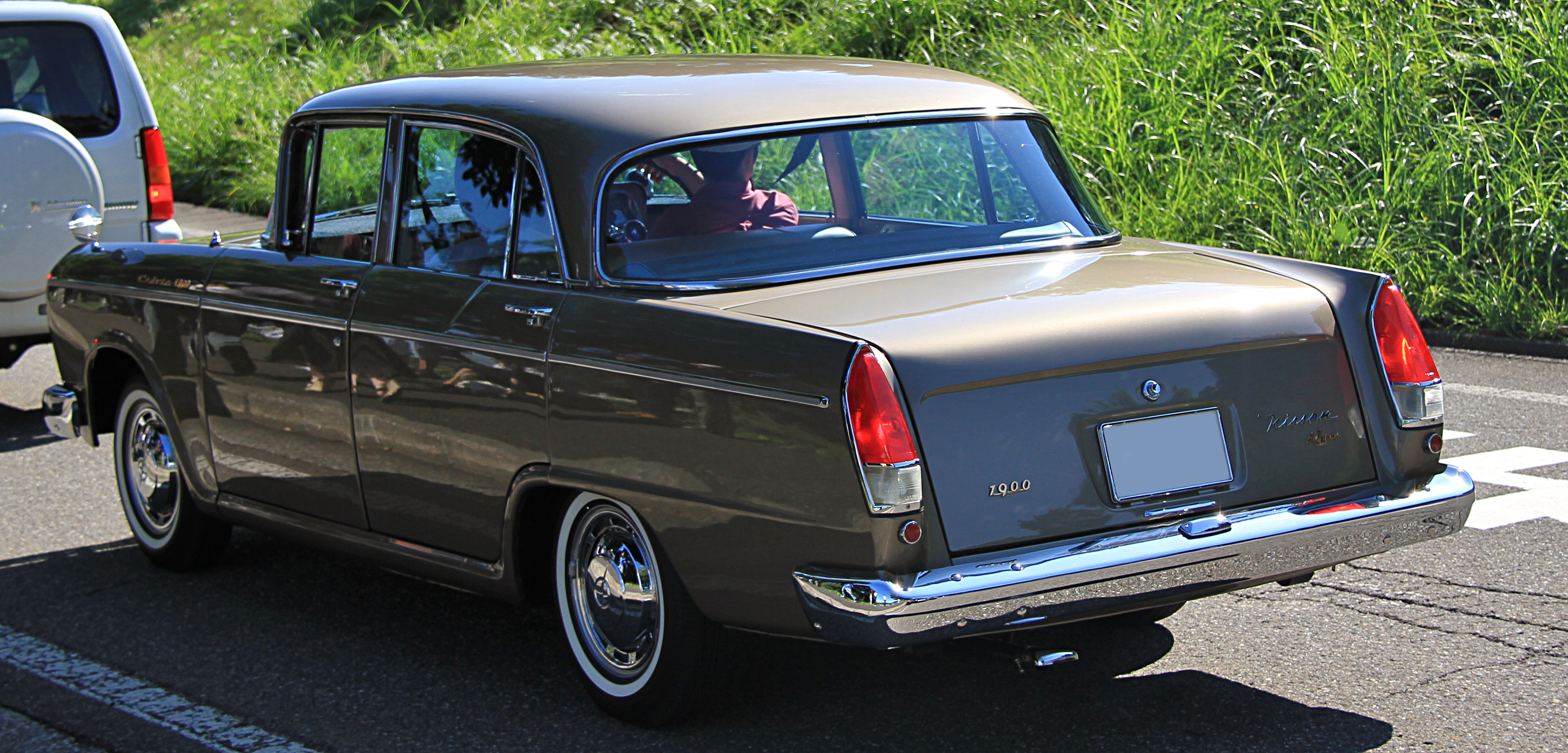
Nissan Cedric Deluxe sedan

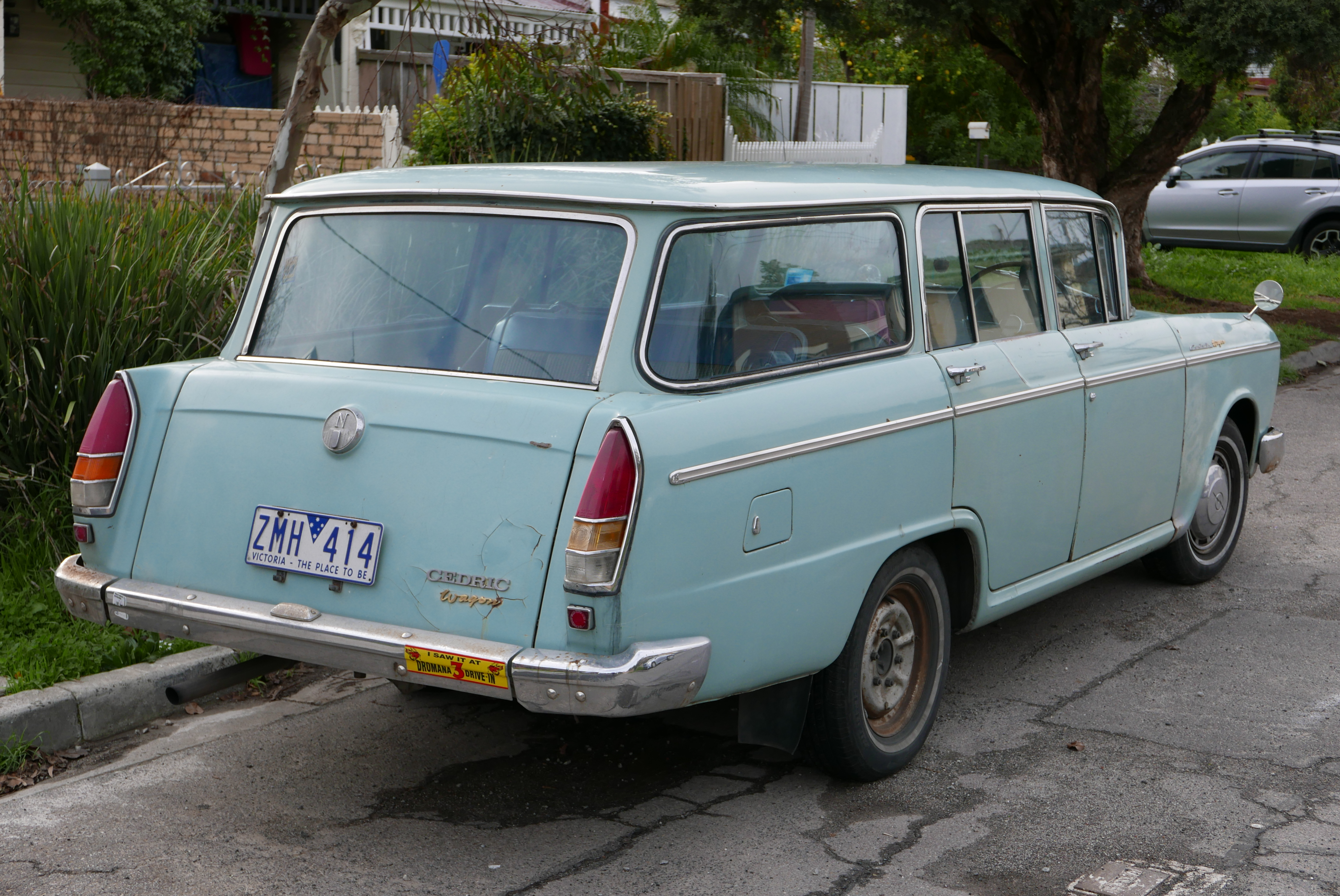
Nissan Cedric 30 wagon

The first Cedric was the "30" series, introduced in March 1960 and produced through 1962. It was available only at Japanese Nissan dealerships called Nissan Cedric Store. It was the first product labeled as a Nissan, but shared mechanicals with Datsun products built at the time.

Several models were available, including the Cedric 1500 DeLuxe and Standard (30), Cedric 1900 Deluxe (D30, powered by the 1.9 L Nissan H engine), Cedric 1900 Custom (G30, also powered by the Nissan H engine), Cedric Van (V30, six-seater) and the Cedric Wagon (WP30, eight-seater). Only the Cedric Standard used a 1.5 L (1,488 cc) G-series straight-four engine which produced 71 PS (52 kW). The 1.9 L (1,883 cc) H-series with 88 PS (65 kW) was optional. A four-speed manual transmission with the top three gears synchronized was standard, with a three-speed manual fitted to 1900 versions. All four-cylinder engines were shared with the redesigned Nissan Junior and Nissan Caball.

The Cedric replaced the Austin A50 Nissan was building under license from Austin Motor Company of England, which was called the Nissan Austin, and also benefited from earlier vehicles built by Nissan, called the Datsun DB Series. The six-seater Cedric introduced Nissan's first monocoque body and a wrap-around windshield. The first Cedric featured two stacked headlights on either side of a large grille (inspired by a late 1950s commuter train from Japan, the Tobu JNR 151). The taillights were the same as the Datsun Bluebird 312 and was considered a six-seater. April 1962 saw the introduction of a station wagon–van, able to seat eight people. The twin-stacked headlight approach, which first appeared on large North American and European vehicles in the late 1950s, was a novel approach to suggest size and luxurious accommodations, and was also used on the 1961 Isuzu Bellel.

=== H31 Series ===
The "H31" series was produced from 1962 until 1965. The models from the 30 series carried over to the 31 series with the addition of a few new models, including the Cedric 1900 Standard (G31S) and a 2.0 L four-cylinder SD20 diesel (QGS31) from June 1964. The diesel engine was supplied by recently acquired Minsei Diesel Industries, Ltd, which had been renamed Nissan Diesel Motor Co. in 1960. Also new was a three-speed automatic transmission, sourced from Borg Warner, offered from July 1964. The new front with its horizontally mounted quad headlights shows a resemblance to the 1956 Rambler and Fiat 2300 limousine, which made the car 18 cm (7 in) longer. In 1965, the pressed-steel tappet cover (valve cover) was replaced with an alloy version (same as the CSP311 Silvia). The taillights were smaller and resembled MG units. All models were equipped with white wall tires. The Cedric was updated again in 1964 with a new dashboard, an alternator rather than a generator, and a new starter system. The Cedric 1500 Standard, first introduced in October 1962, was dropped after 1964. The last change was the adoption of a new grille for the 1965 model year.

This generation was imported to the United States around 1963 and 1965. Unlike other cars sold by Nissan before their global rebranding, which were sold as Datsuns in North America, the Cedric was sold as a Nissan. It did not sell well and only a handful are known to exist in the United States.

=== Cedric Special H50 ===
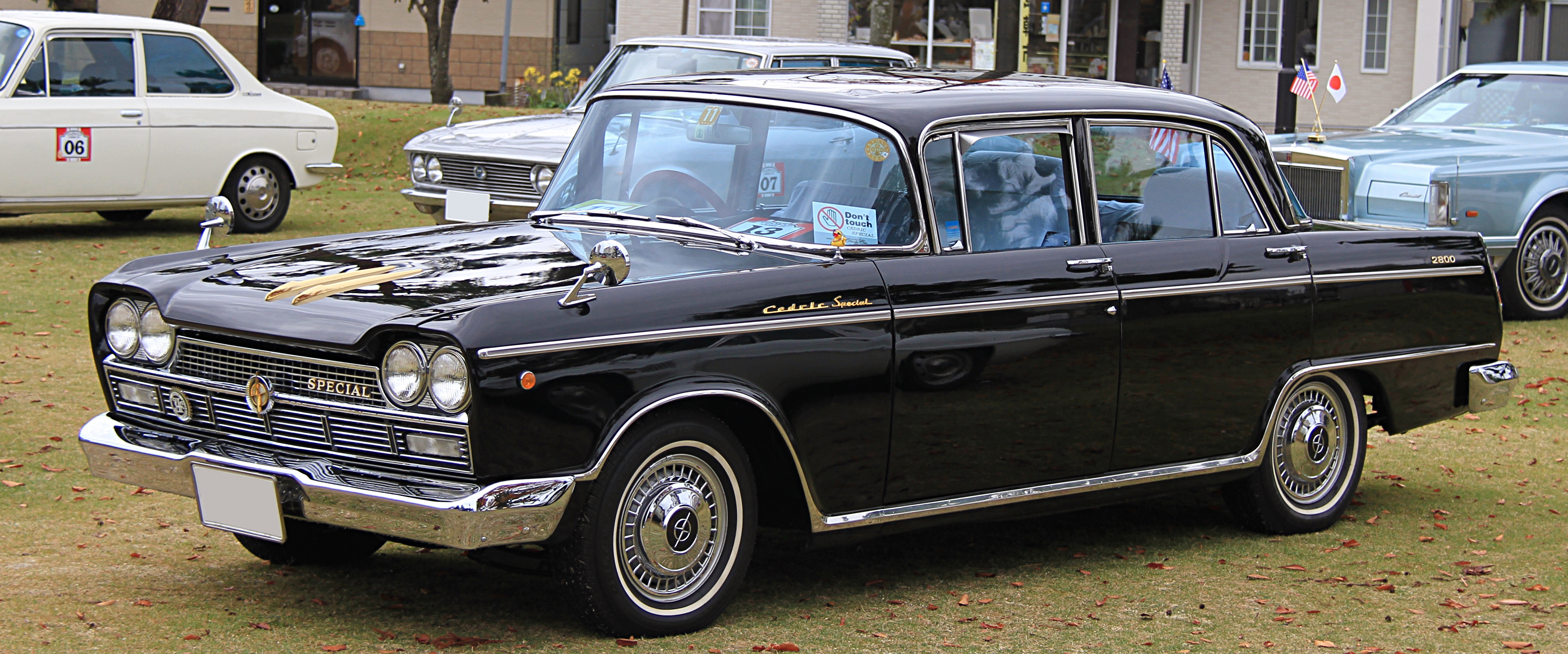
1965 Nissan Cedric Special

The Cedric Special was produced between 1963 and 1965 as competition to the Toyota Crown, Isuzu Bellel, Mitsubishi Debonair and Prince Gloria. The Cedric Custom was used as a torch carrier for the 1964 Summer Olympics, held in Tokyo in October 1964.

This was a long-wheelbase version of the H31 series Cedric Custom, lengthened 145 mm (5.7 in) to fit the 118 hp (88 kW) 2.8-litre K-Series straight-six engine (an H engine with two extra cylinders). The grille is different from the one on the 31 series; it features a badge that said "Cedric Special", and the Cedric Star emblem. The side badges said "Cedric" and "Special". On the trunk lid (on the left side) is a "2800" badge, on the right side is a "Cedric Special" badge. The gold trim pieces on the hood were longer, and there was wheel arch and sill trim that was unique to the Cedric Special. The front bumper design is also different, with a raised section in the middle above the license plate. Due to the larger 2.8 L engine used in the Cedric Special, Japanese buyers are liable for a higher annual road tax which added to its exclusivity.

The interior was slightly more luxurious than the Custom. The only component that was identical to the Custom were the tail lights. The Mark I Special was produced in 1963, and was replaced by the Mark II in 1964. The Mark II was mostly the same as the Mark I except for a redesigned dashboard, new grille design (gold Cedric Star emblem and separate gold letters spelling "Special"), and rectangular reflectors below the tail lights (replacing the round reflectors used on the Mark I). An automatic transmission, the Borg-Warner 35, became available starting with the Mark II. The Mark II was produced in 1963 and 1964, and was replaced by the Mark III Special in 1964. The Mark III featured a new grille and tail lights from the 1965 31 Series Cedric. The Mark III Cedric Special was replaced by the Nissan President in 1965.

== Second generation (130; 1965) ==
Nissan Cedric 130
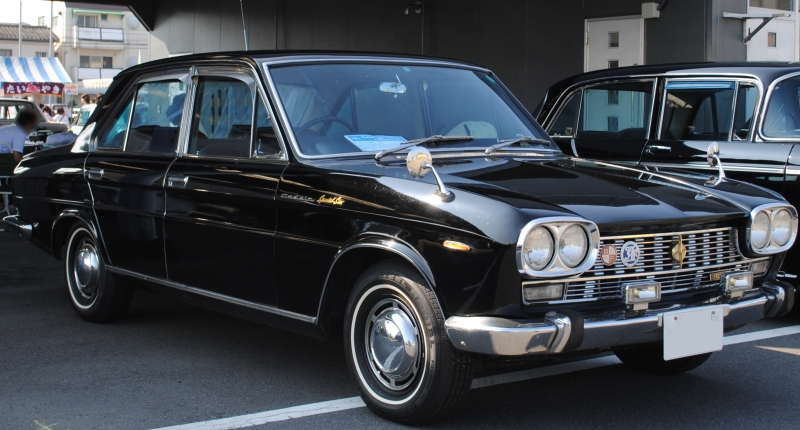
- Nissan Cedric Special Six (130)

Overview
- Also called: Datsun 2000/2300/2400 (export); Yue Loong 801A (TW)
- Production: 1965–1971
- Assembly: Japan: Yokosuka, Kanagawa; Taiwan: Taipei County

Body and chassis
- Body style: 4-door sedan/wagon/van
- Layout: FR layout

Powertrain
- Engine: 2.0 L H20 I4 (130/V130/W130); 2.0 L J20 I6 (P130/VP130/WP130); 2.0 L L20 I6 (H130); 2.3 L L23 I6 (G130); 2.4 L L24 I6 (G130); 4.0 L Y40 V8 (Police only); 2.2 L SD22 diesel I4 (Q130)
- Transmission: 3-speed automatic; 4-speed manual

Dimensions
- Wheelbase: 2,690 mm (105.9 in)
- Length: 4,680 mm (184.3 in)
- Width: 1,690 mm (66.5 in)
- Height: 1,455 mm (57.3 in)
- Curb weight: 1,280–1,319 kg (2,822–2,908 lb)

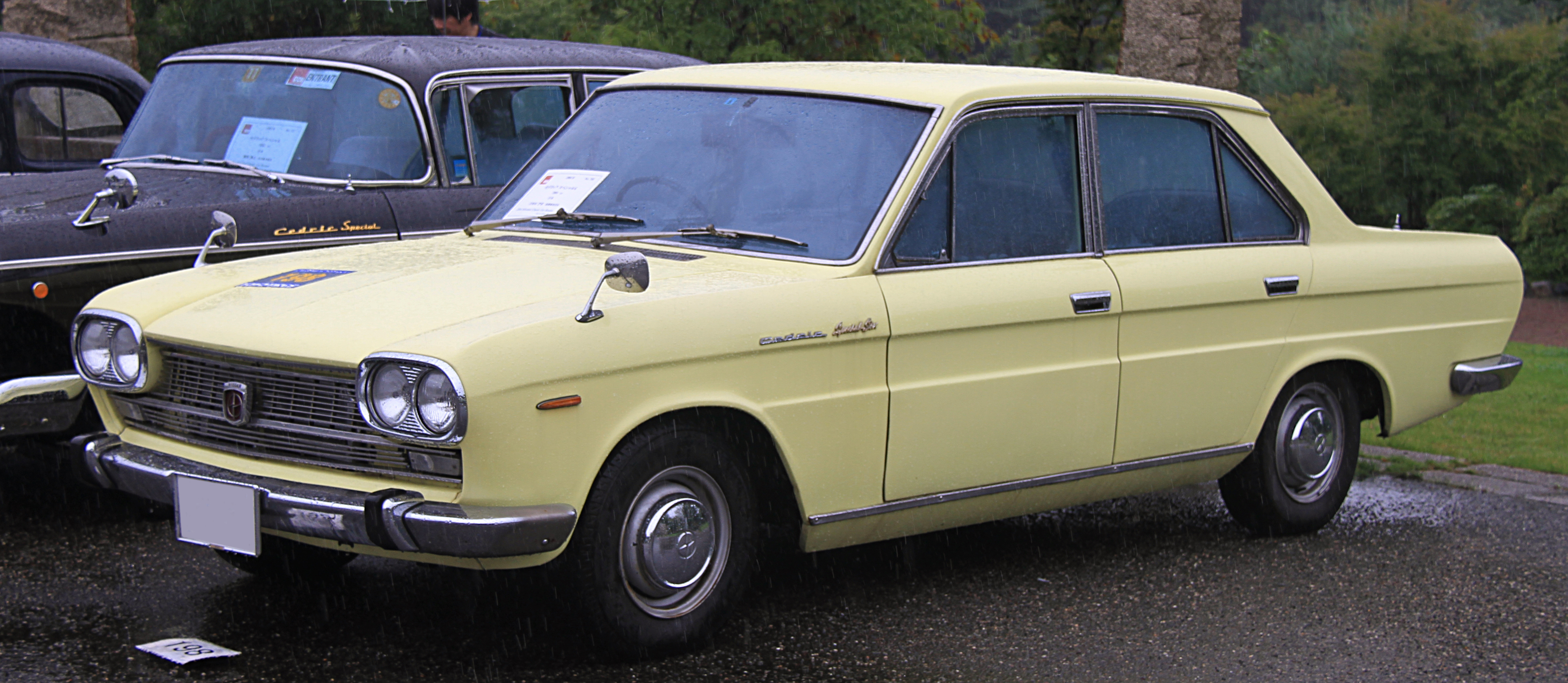
1968 Nissan Cedric Special 6

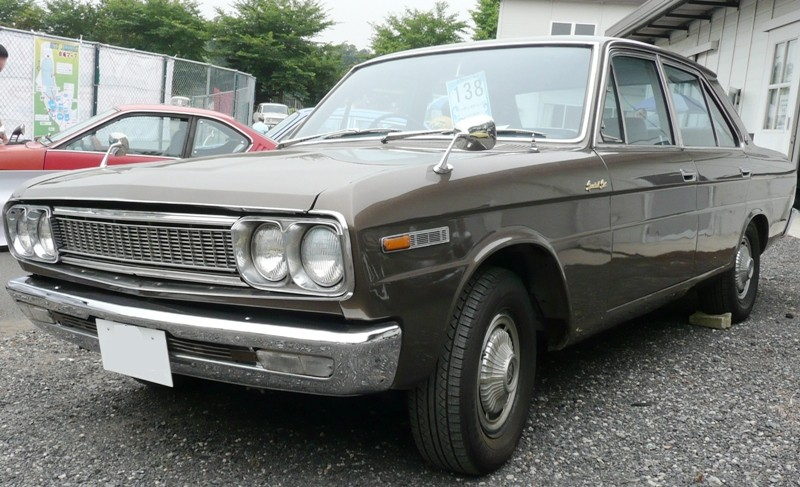
1969 Nissan Cedric 130 Special 6

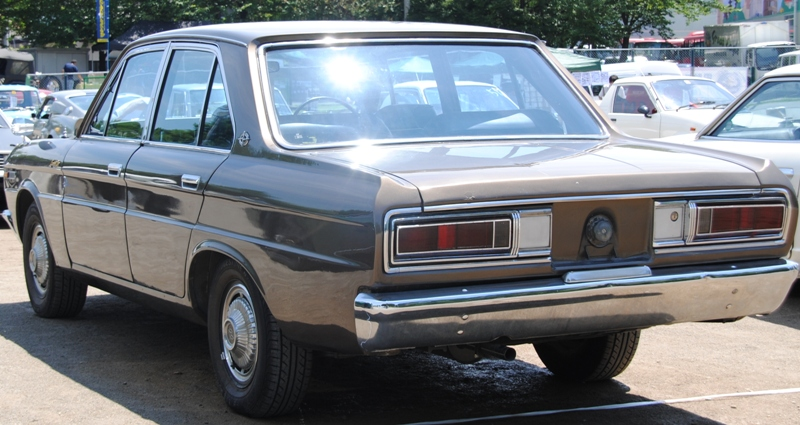
Rear view of 1969 Cedric Special 6

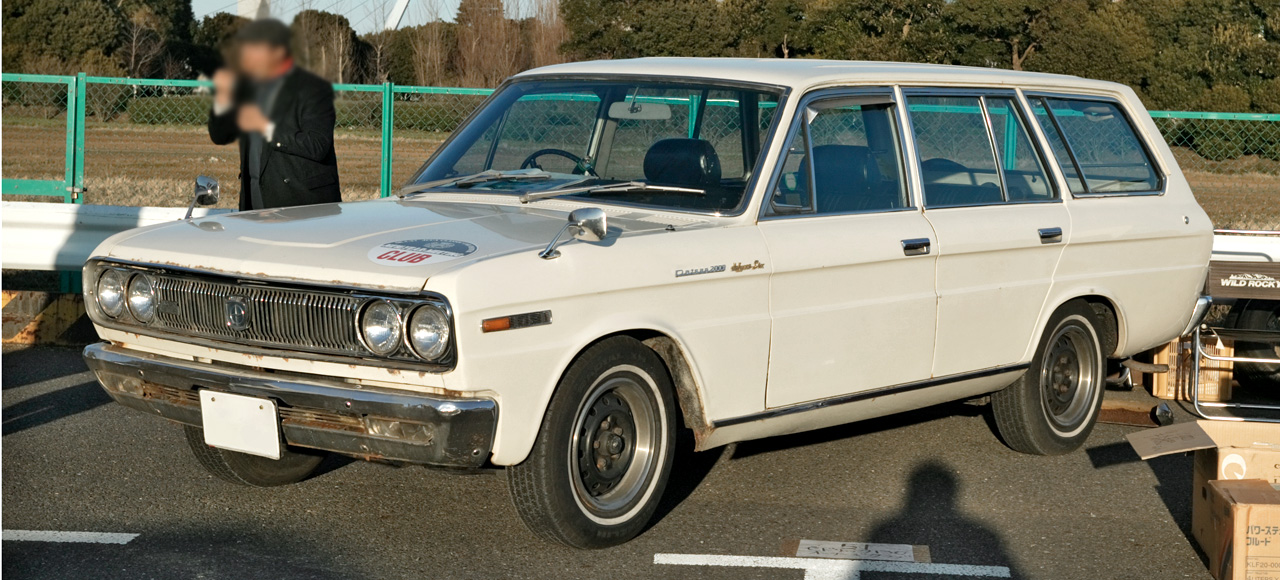
Cedric 130 wagon

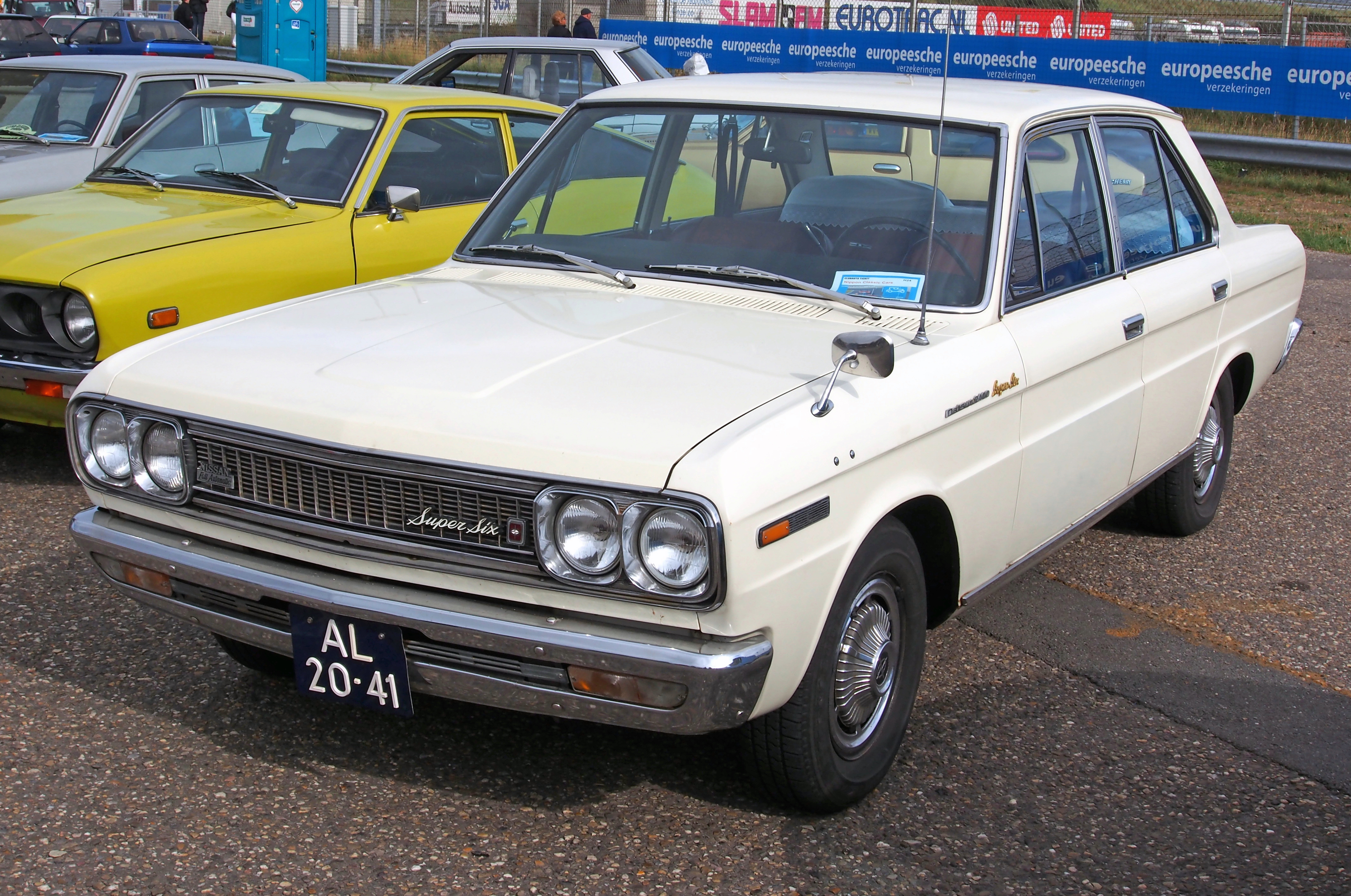
European market "Datsun 2400 Super Six"

Produced from 1965 through 1971, the P130 Cedric had Pininfarina bodywork and several new engine options on an all-new dedicated platform. Nissan's first OHC engine, the L20, was introduced in this generation Cedric. The modernized appearance was influenced by other Japanese luxury sedans of the period that introduced sleek, squared, and angular sedans, like the 1962 Toyota Crown and the 1964 Mitsubishi Debonair. Its appearance was not shared with the executive limousine flagship Nissan President, and this generation of Cedric was available at "Nissan Motor Stores".

In August 1966, Nissan Motor Company and Prince Motor Company merged. Starting in 1967, the Cedric was sold in various export markets, as the Datsun 2000/2300/2400 rather than "Nissan Cedric".

There were three body styles available: a four-door sedan, five-door station wagon (Wagon Six from 1967, WP130, later WH130) and a five-door van (Van Six from 1968, also as Van Deluxe Six for 1970, VP130, later VH130)

Trim levels offered were the four-cylinder 130 (later called Standard) for 1966–1967, as 130S for 1968–1970. The Deluxe Six (P130, 1967.5-1970), Custom Six (P130D, dropped after 1966, reintroduced in 1970 as H130V), Standard (later called Personal Six, P130S, G130S), Personal Deluxe Six (G130Q, H130Q, replaced Personal Six for 1970), Standard Diesel (later called Diesel, Q130), and Special Six (also called Super Six, H130 for 1966–1967, G130 for 1969–1970, G130V for 1968 Super Six). In 1967, there were 68 model variations of the Cedric.

Unique to this generation, Nissan produced a police car fitted with the Y40 V8 engine; this was the only time Nissan installed a V8 engine in the Cedric.

Engines:

- 1966–1971 2.0 L (1,983 cc) H20 OHV I4, 92 PS (68 kW) (4 Cylinder/Standard)
- 1966–1968 2.0 L (1,973 cc) J20 OHV I6, 100 PS (74 kW) (Deluxe, P130D Custom, P130S Personal Six, WP130 Wagon and Van)
- 1966–1968 2.0 L (1,998 cc) L20 OHC twin-carb I6, 130 PS (96 kW) (H130 Special Six and H130 Super Six)
- 1969 2.3 L (2,263 cc) L23 OHC I6, 125 PS (92 kW) (1969 G130S Special Six, 1969 "G130S Personal Six" and 1969 G130V Super Six)
- 1970–1971 2.0 L (1,998 cc) L20A OHC I6, 115 PS (85 kW) (H130V Custom, H130Q Personal Deluxe Six, WH130 Wagon, and Van)
- 1970–1971 2.4 L (2,393 cc) L24 OHC I6, 130 PS (96 kW) (G130Q Personal Deluxe, G130 Special Six, and G130 Super Six)
- 1965–1971 2.2 L (1,991 cc) SD20 OHV Diesel I4, 70 PS (51 kW) (Diesel)

This was the first Cedric that was available in versions no longer regarded as compact sedans under Japanese vehicle classification regulations, since the engines' displacement exceeded two litres.

== Third generation (230; 1971) ==
Nissan Cedric 230
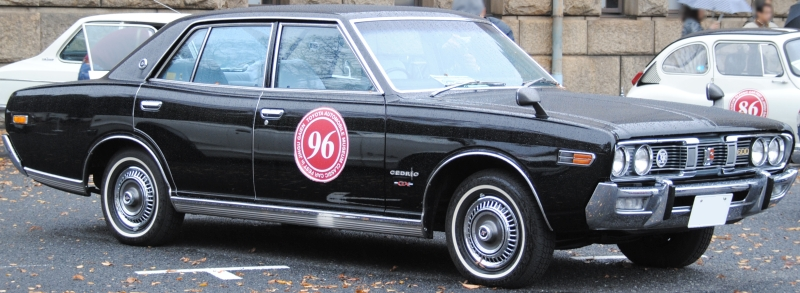
- 1974 Nissan Cedric Sedan 2600GX (facelift, Japan)

Overview
- Also called: Nissan Gloria; Yue Loong 802 (TW); Datsun 200/220/240/260/300C
- Production: 1971–1975
- Assembly: Japan: Kaminokawa, Tochigi; Taiwan: Taipei County

Body and chassis
- Body style: 2-door coupé; 4-door hardtop/sedan; 5-door wagon/van
- Layout: FR layout

Powertrain
- Engine: 2.0 L H20 I4; 2.0 L L20A I6; 2.4 L L24 I6; 2.6 L L26 I6; 2.0 L SD20 diesel I4; 2.2 L SD22 diesel I4
- Transmission: 3-speed automatic; 4/5-speed manual

Dimensions
- Wheelbase: 2,690 mm (105.9 in)
- Length: 4,690 mm (184.6 in)
- Width: 1,690 mm (66.5 in)
- Height: 1,455 mm (57.3 in)
- Curb weight: 1,345–1,459 kg (2,965–3,217 lb)

The 230 series was released in 1971 and was produced through 1975. The Cedric was now being built at the Tochigi factory location. The suspension configuration remained the same type as used in the second generation. Front disc brakes were added to the standard equipment list for some versions. The Cedric name was dropped for most export markets, with the car now called the Datsun 200C, 220C, 240C, or 260C. In many European markets, this car was available only with the diesel engine, aimed in particular at the taxi market. The Cedric was exclusive to the Japanese Nissan dealership network called Nissan Motor Store as the private ownership luxury sedan to the shorter Nissan Laurel, while the Nissan Gloria, manufactured by the Prince Motor Company, was exclusive to Nissan Prince Store locations after the merger with Nissan, with the Nissan Skyline serving as the junior sedan and coupé to the Gloria.

The 230 series was offered in four-door sedan and wagon, and saw the introduction of a two-door coupé. The coupé "personal luxury car" was introduced as a result of the 1970 Toyota Crown hardtop coupé.

In August 1972, a four-door hardtop sedan, with no B-pillar between the front and rear passenger side windows, was added to the options list. This generation introduced a new appearance, called "coke bottle," which began to appear internationally during the 1960s and 1970s. The four-door hardtop had a standard interior dome light and a secondary fluorescent lamp that extended from the front to rear passenger seats, attached to the ceiling for ambient purposes. The 2.4-litre engine was replaced with a larger 2.6-litre version to conform to emission regulations enacted in April 1973 without losing performance. Vehicles installed with Nissan's new emission control technology, including fuel-injected models, could be identified by a NAPS badge on the trunk lid. In South Africa, the car was sold as the Datsun 260C with a 96 kW (131 PS; 129 hp) version of the L26 engine; this engine (still of 2.6 liters) was upgraded to produce 110 kW (150 PS; 148 hp) in late 1975 when the car was somewhat confusingly renamed the Datsun 300C. The four-door sedan and two-door hardtop were available, and the interior was renewed along with the upgrade.

The trim levels offered were the 2600 GL, the 2600 Custom Deluxe, and the Deluxe.

Engines:

- 2.0 L (1982 cc) H20 OHV I4 – 92 PS (68 kW), 140 km/h
- 2.0 L (1998 cc) L20A OHC I6 – 115 PS (85 kW), 165 km/h
  twin-SU carb version (GX): 125 PS (92 kW), 170 km/h
- 2.4 L (2393 cc) L24 OHC I6 (1971–1972)
- 2.6 L (2565 cc) L26 OHC I6 (1972–1975) – 140 PS (103 kW)

Diesel:

- 2.0 L (1991 cc) SD20 OHV diesel I4
- 2.2 L (2164 cc) SD22 OHV diesel I4 – 70 PS (51 kW), 125 km/h, 0–100 km/h (62 mph) in 28 sec
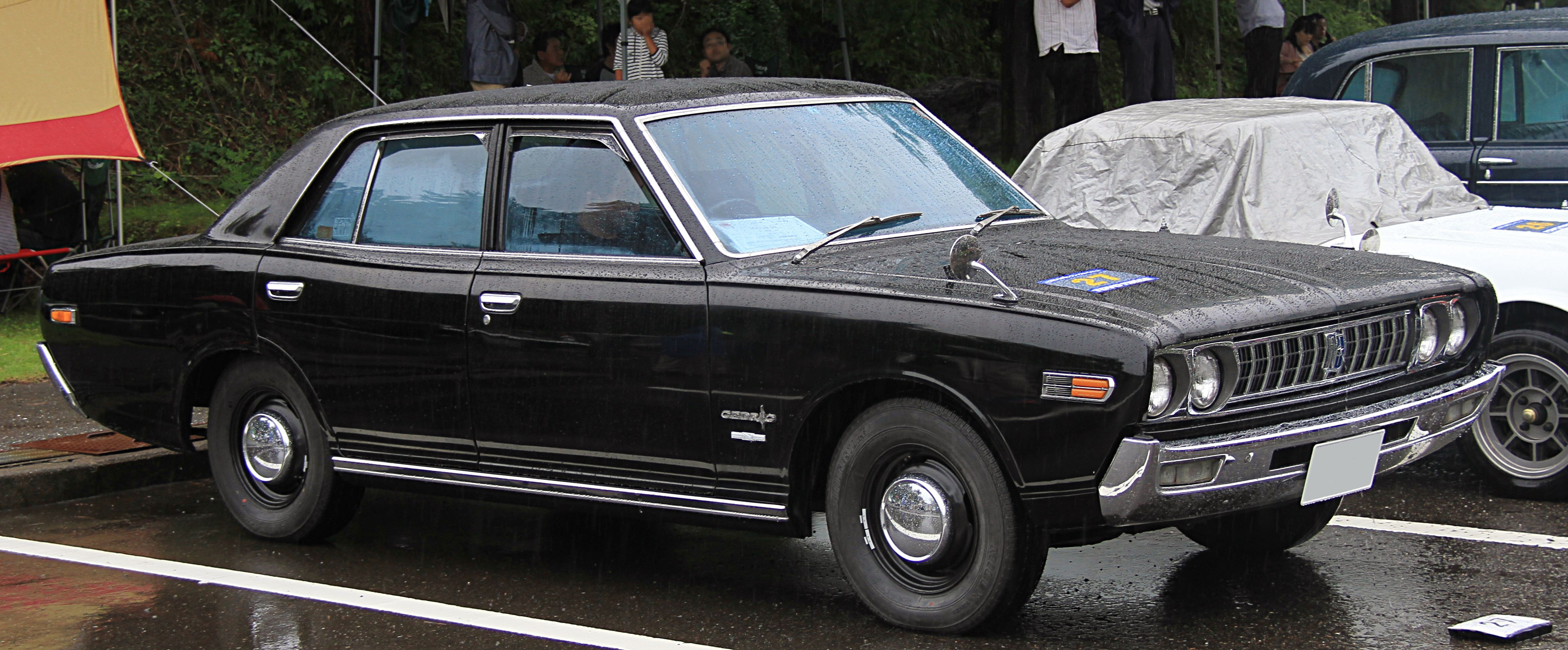
1971 Nissan Cedric 2000 Deluxe 4-door Sedan

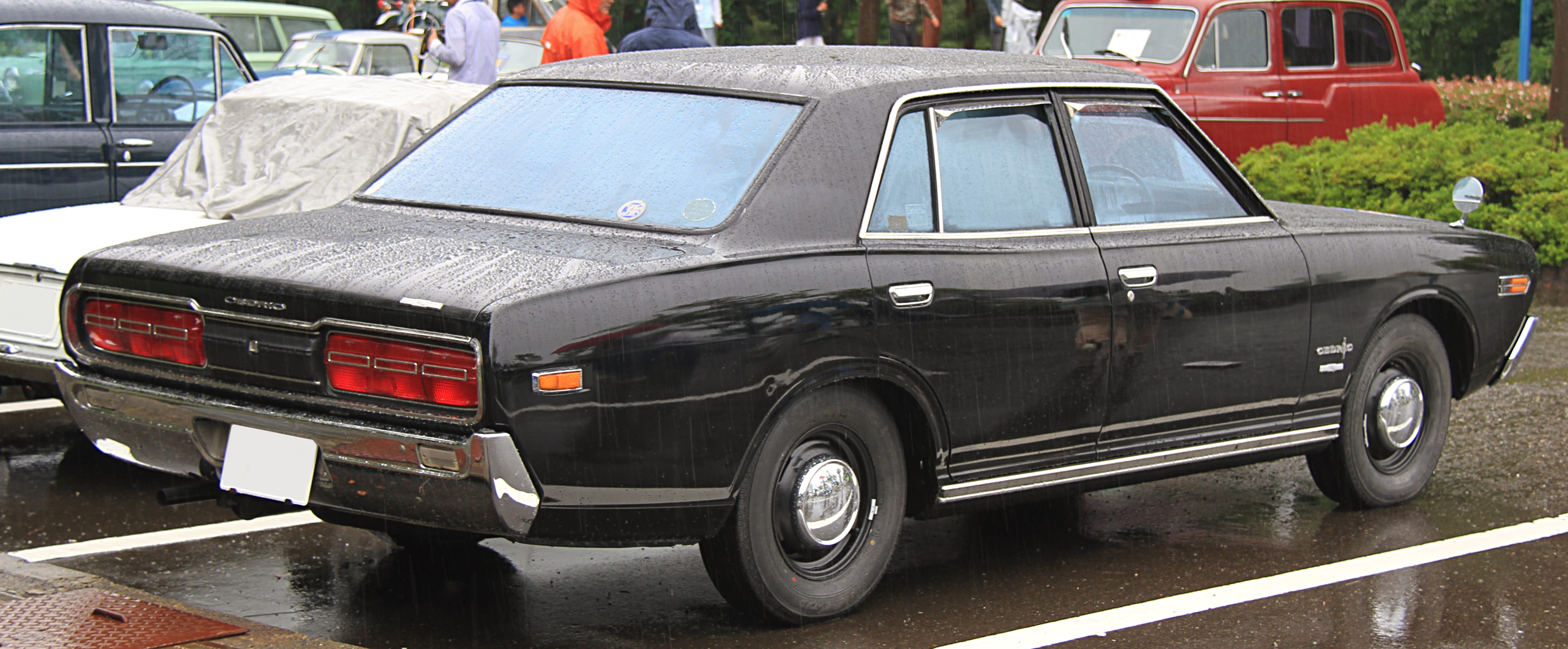
1971 Nissan Cedric 2000 Deluxe 4-door Sedan

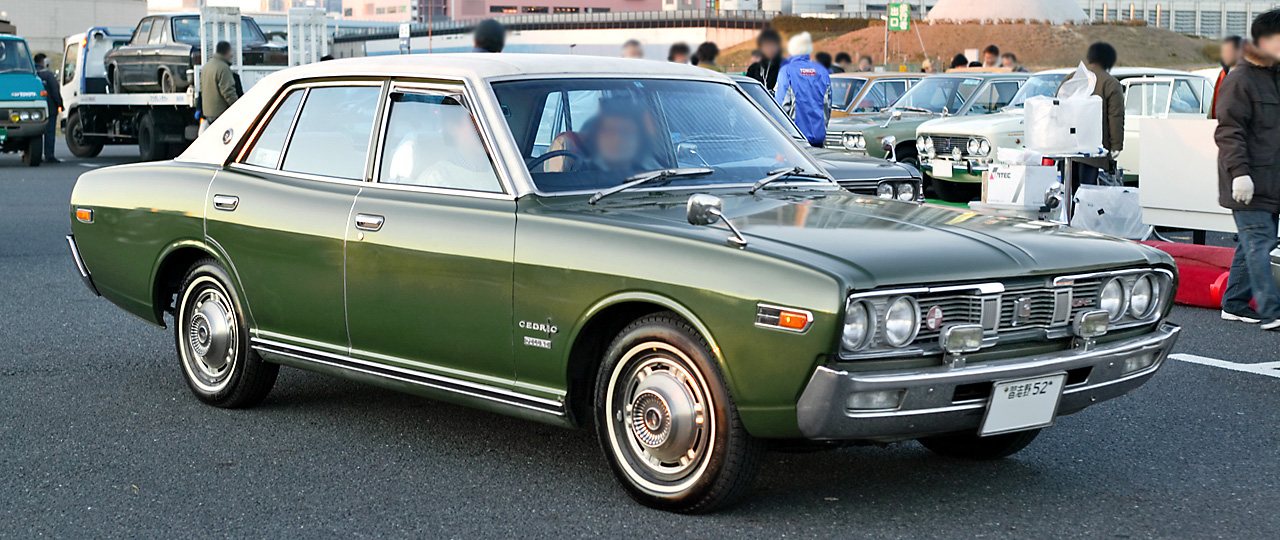
Nissan Cedric 2000 Custom Deluxe 4-door Sedan

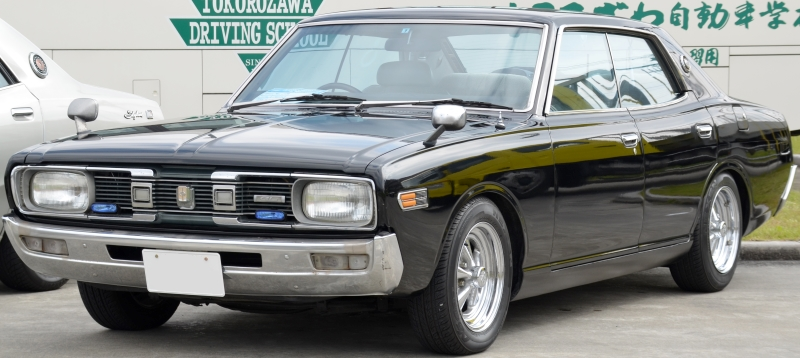
1972 Nissan Cedric 230GL 4-door Hardtop

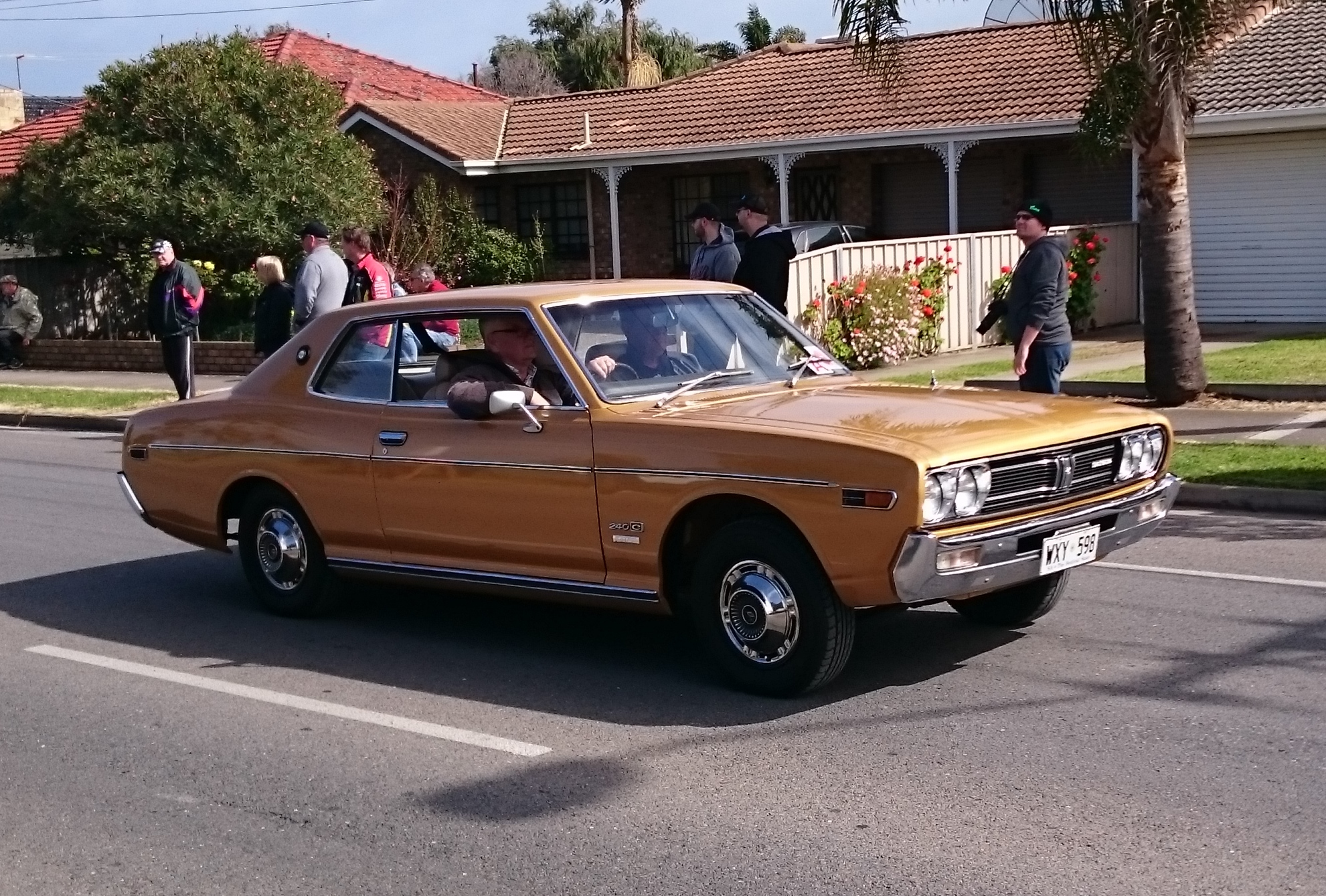
Datsun 240C GL Hardtop (Australia)

== Fourth generation (330; 1975) ==
Nissan Cedric 330
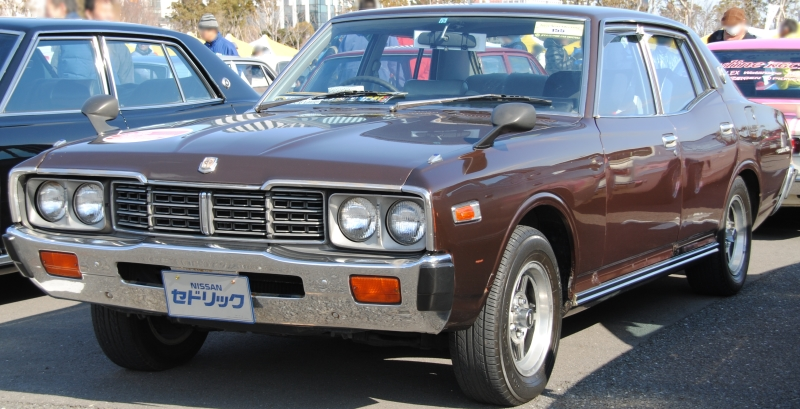
- 1977 Nissan Cedric Sedan GL (330)

Overview
- Also called: Nissan Gloria; Datsun 200/220/260/280C; Yue Loong 803/805 (TW)
- Production: 1975–1979
- Assembly: Japan: Kaminokawa, Tochigi; Taiwan: Taipei County

Body and chassis
- Body style: 2-door coupe; 4-door hardtop; 4-door sedan; 5-door wagon/van
- Layout: FR layout

Powertrain
- Engine: petrol: 2.0 L H20 OHV I4 (N330); 2.0 L L20(A) I6 (330); 2.6 L L26 I6 (H330); 2.8 L L28 I6 (P330); diesel: 2.0 L SD20 OHV I4 (Q330); 2.2 L SD22 OHV I4 (R330)
- Transmission: 3-speed automatic; 3/4/5-speed manual

Dimensions
- Wheelbase: 2,690 mm (105.9 in)
- Length: 4,690 mm (184.6 in); 4,785 mm (188.4 in) (Brougham)
- Width: 1,695 mm (66.7 in); 1,705 mm (67.1 in)) (Brougham)
- Height: 1,440 mm (56.7 in)
- Curb weight: 1,440–1,550 kg (3,175–3,417 lb)

The 330 series Cedric was produced from 1975 through 1979. As with the 230, the 330 was offered as a Sedan, Wagon/Van, Coupé, and as a comparatively rare, pillarless Hardtop Sedan. Again, it was sold as the Gloria as well in the domestic Japanese market; in the export it was marketed as the 200C, 220C, 260C, and 280C (after 1978). For this generation, the 2.6 was reserved for export markets. The diesel engine returned, mainly for taxi usage, although there was initially also a Diesel Deluxe aimed at private buyers. For the same purpose, there was a version of the four-cylinder "H20" petrol engine which ran on LPG. Trim levels offered at the time of introduction were the Deluxe, Custom Deluxe, GL, GL-E, SGL, SGL-E, 2800SGL, and 2800SGL-E. The "SGL" designation stands for Senior Grade Level, and the "E" represents fuel injection. Japanese buyers of the larger-engined models were liable for higher road taxes. The top-of-the-line Brougham version also first appeared in this generation, in June 1977, at the same time that the range was facelifted. In Japan, the wagon bodystyle was sold exclusively as a van, aimed at commercial buyers, and only with the carburetted, two-litre L20S inline-six.

The engines were further modified in June 1976 as emission control regulations were again adjusted, with the revised engines using the moniker Nissan NAPS. Model codes for petrol-engined cars were changed to 331, to reflect the engine changes. At the same time, halogen headlights were added and the luxurious F-series subvariant was introduced, only on the hardtop bodystyle (also available on the Gloria). Positioned just beneath the Brougham, "F" stood for fashionable. This was expressed by the fitment of rectangular headlamps, body-coloured hubcaps, and a higher quality audio system. The June 1977 was a very minor one, limited to changes to the grilles and taillights, better sound proofing, and some engine and lineup modifications. The new Brougham model received a fuel injected version of the 2.8-litre six, producting 145 PS (107 kW; 143 hp) rather than the 140 PS (103 kW; 138 hp) of the carburetted variant.

October 1977 saw 1 million Cedrics produced. In November 1978 the petrol engines on private-use models were revised to meet the 1978 emissions standards, leading to model codes being changed to 332 for cars equipped with those engines (diesels and vans remained 330). At the same time, radial tyres were made standard fitment on some of the highest-end models.

The Datsun 220C Diesel was commonly used as taxis in Singapore and Hong Kong. This model came with front bench seat and column-shift manual transmission. Nissan offered column-shifted manuals with three or four speeds (the three-speed also available with overdrive), floor shifted manuals with four or five speeds, and three-speed automatics with floor- or column-mounted shifters.

Engines:

- 2.0 L (1982 cc) H20 OHV I4
- 2.0 L (1998 cc) L20A OHC I6
- 2.4 L (2393 cc) L24 OHC I6 (Yue Loong 805)
- 2.6 L (2565 cc) L26 OHC I6 (1976–1978; not sold in Japan)
- 2.8 L (2753 cc) L28 OHC I6 (1975–1979)
- 2.0 L (1991 cc) SD20 OHV diesel I4
- 2.2 L (2164 cc) SD22 OHV diesel I4
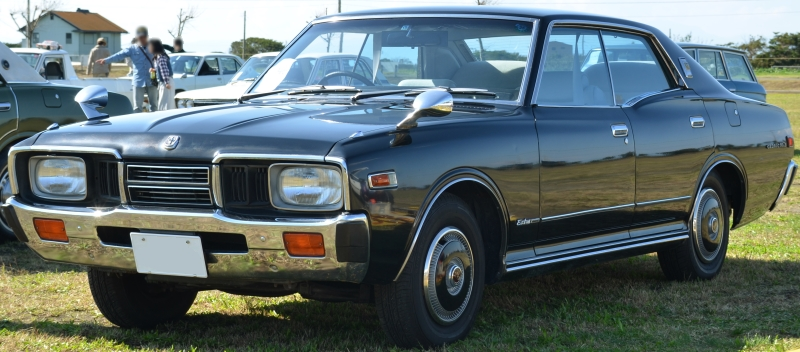
Nissan Cedric SGL-E Extra 4-door hardtop (Japan)

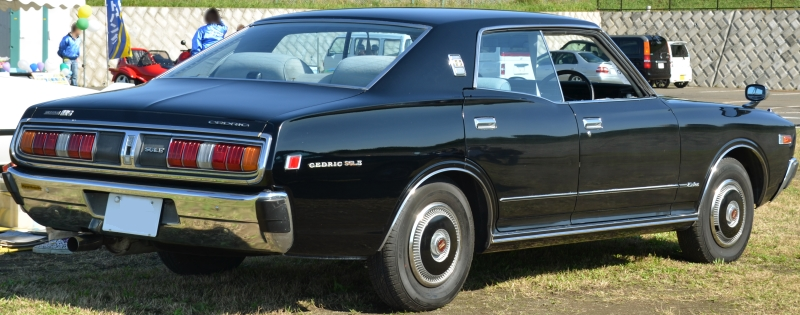
Nissan Cedric 4-door hardtop SGL-Extra (Japan)

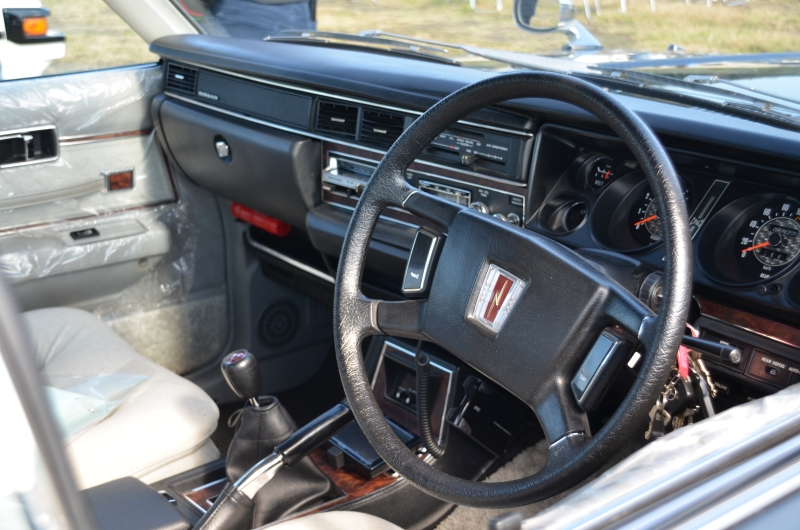
Nissan Cedric SGL-E Extra interior (Japan)

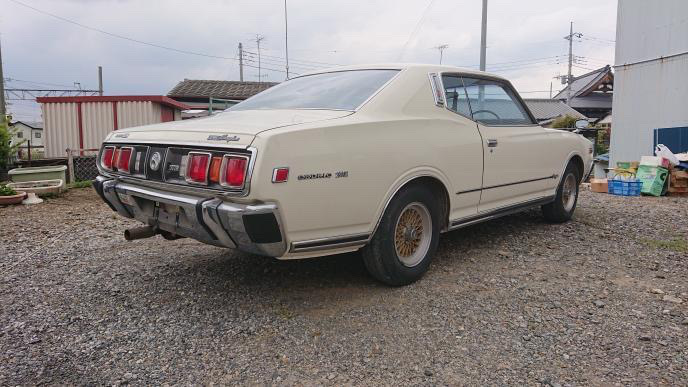
Datsun Cedric 2-door hardtop coupé (Japan)

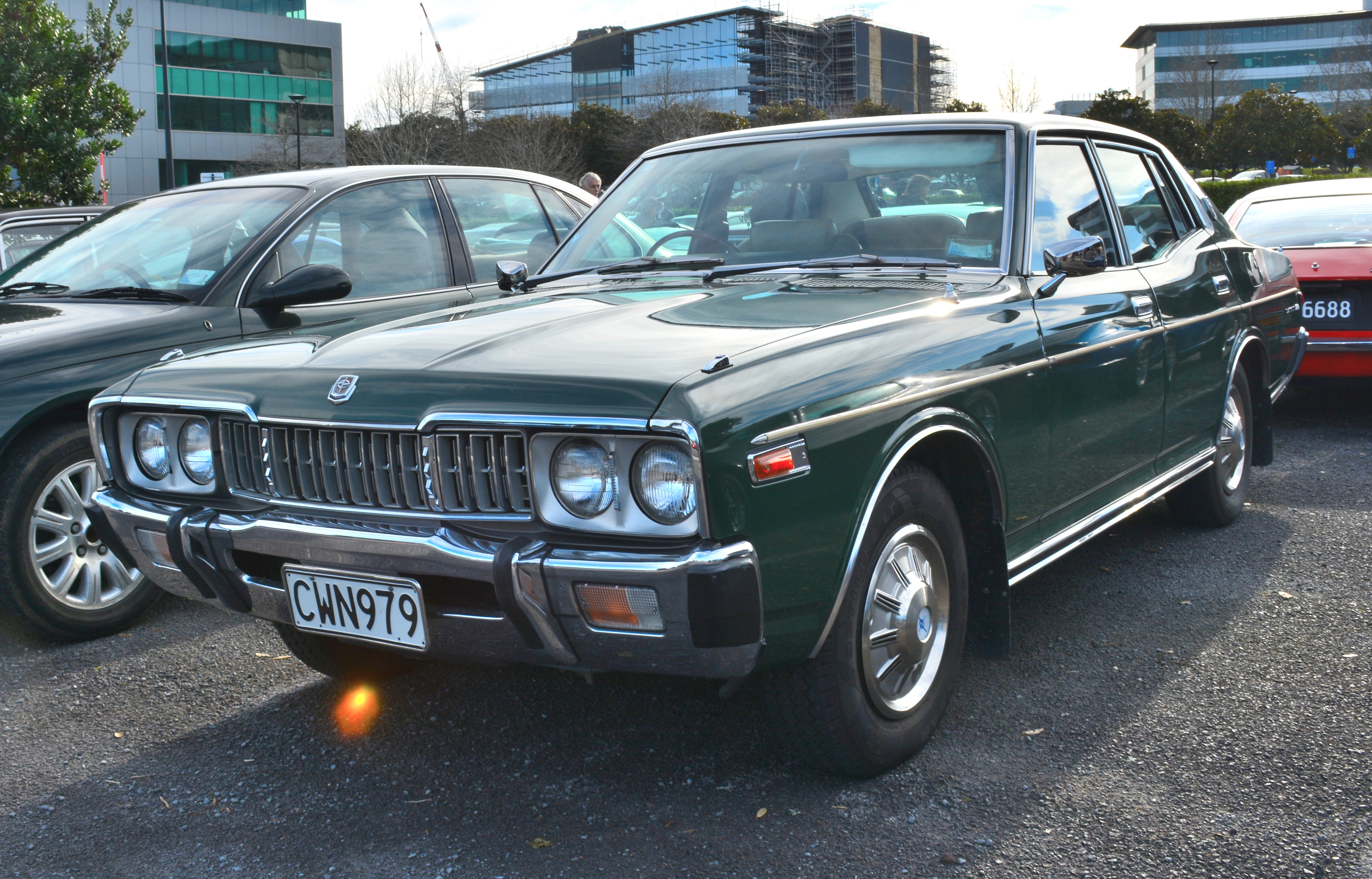
1979 Datsun 260C with vertical grille (New Zealand)

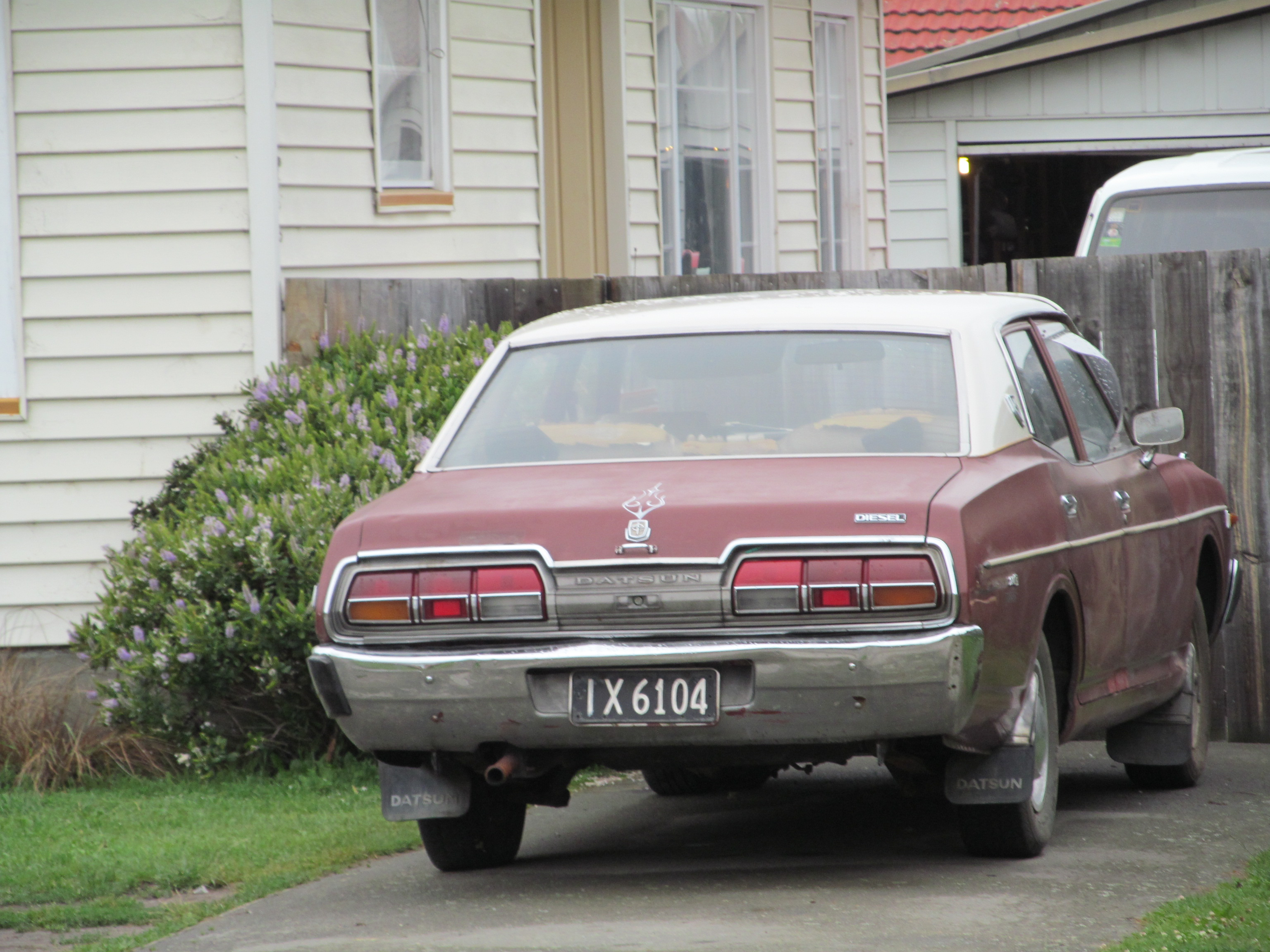
1978 Datsun 220C Diesel (New Zealand)

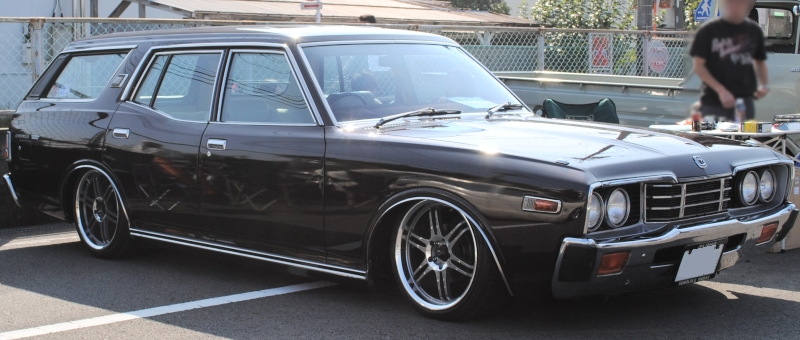
Nissan Cedric Van (Japan)

== Fifth generation (430; 1979) ==
Nissan Cedric 430
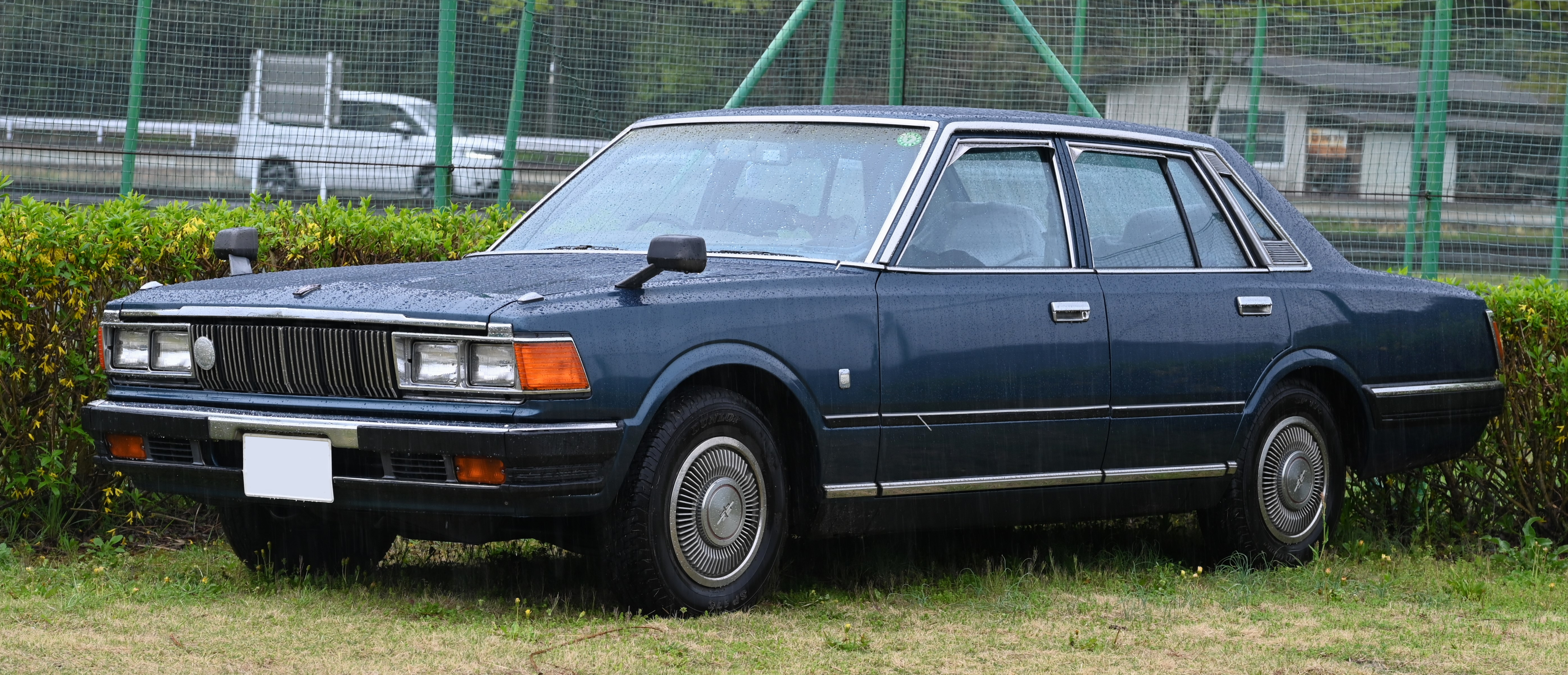
- 1979 Nissan Cedric Sedan 200E SGL Extra (430)

Overview
- Also called: Nissan Gloria; Datsun 220C/280C; Yue Loong 806/807 (TW)
- Production: 1979–1983
- Assembly: Japan: Kaminokawa, Tochigi; Taiwan: Miaoli
- Designer: Toshio Yamashita

Body and chassis
- Body style: 4-door sedan/hardtop; 5-door wagon/van
- Layout: FR layout

Powertrain
- Engine: petrol: 2.0 L H20 I4 (export only); 2.0 L Z20 I4 (N430, LPG only); 2.0 L L20S/L20E I6 (430/V430/V431/W430); 2.0 L L20ET turbo I6 (430); 2.4 L L24 I6 (M430, export only); 2.8 L L28 I6 (P430/YP430); LPG: 2.0 L L20P I6 (430); diesel: 2.0 L SD20 I4 (S430); 2.2 L SD22 I4 (R430/VR430); 2.8 L LD28 I6 (H430/VH430/WH430)
- Transmission: 4/5-speed manual; 3/4-speed automatic

Dimensions
- Wheelbase: 2,690 mm (105.9 in)
- Length: 4,695–4,825 mm (184.8–190.0 in)
- Width: 1,695–1,715 mm (66.7–67.5 in))
- Height: 1,430 mm (56.3 in)
- Curb weight: 1,470–1,590 kg (3,240–3,510 lb)

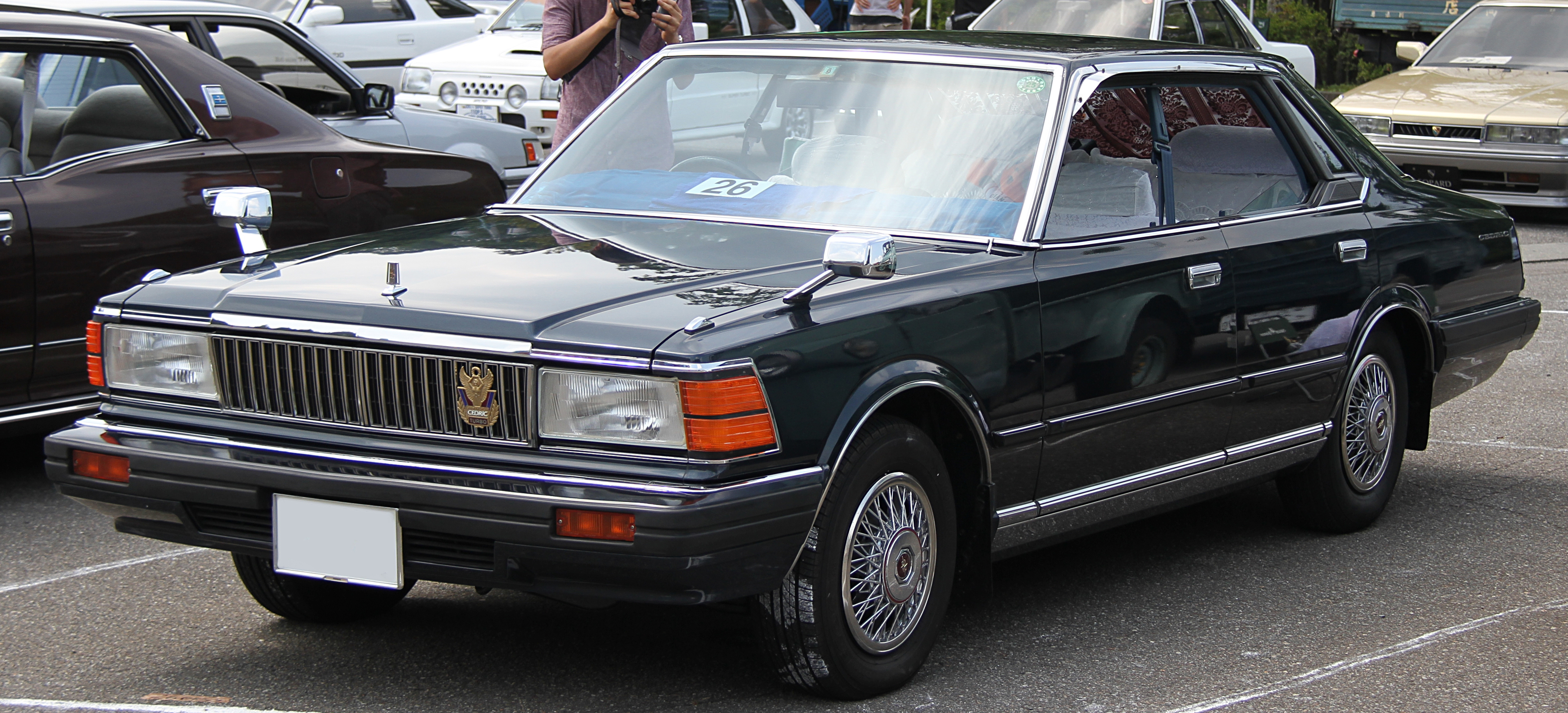
1980 Nissan Cedric Hardtop (430)

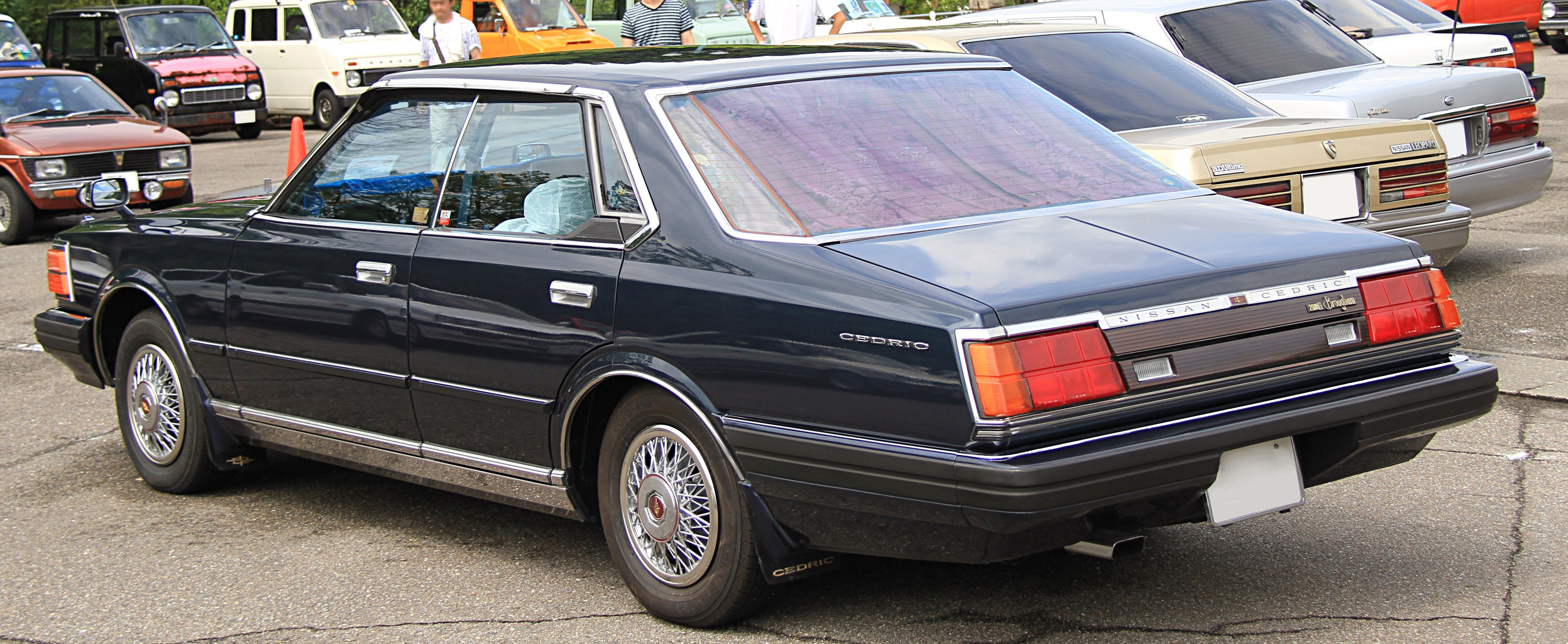
1981 Nissan Cedric Hardtop 280E Brougham (YP430)

The 430 series was produced from 1979 through 1983. Engines largely carried over from the previous generation. Most export markets received the 2.8 L L28 OHC I6 or the new LD28 diesel version, and was called the Datsun 280C. For taxi use in Singapore and Hong Kong, the 2.2-liter diesel engine was still available in what was called the 220C; this model was also sold as a sedan or van in Japan until it was cancelled with the 1981 facelift. This was the first generation Cedric with available four-wheel disc brakes, although drums all around were fitted to the cheapest versions. Styling was achieved with the cooperation of Pininfarina, providing a cleaner image than the previous generation. The new model was a "six-light" design, with a small window in the C-pillar. The rear suspension was upgraded to a rigid link coil system.

The two-door coupé was no longer offered, and was replaced by the Skyline-based Nissan Leopard luxury sports coupé. A four-door convertible version was made available in small numbers for special use. These were mainly bought by government entities for ceremonial use and the bodystyle was not offered on sale to the general public.

The fashionable SGL-F variant appeared in April 1980, continuing from the "F" version which had been available in the previous generation. Priced only just below the less youthful Brougham, it was only available with the naturally aspirated 2.0-litre six and featured two-tone paint in light colors only, a glass sunroof, and a plush interior designed by the American Chatham Manufacturing Company. Beginning in August 1980, the six-cylinder 2.8-liter diesel was added to the Van and Wagon models in Japan. A lock-up torque converter was added to the four-speed automatic transmission, which was added in June 1982. This new transmission gave considerably better fuel economy, but did necessitate altering the floor plate to provide a wider transmission tunnel. At this time, the L20-engined van received a version of the engine which met the 1981 emissions standards; this model received the new chassis code V431. In February 1983, the "Excellence" trim was added to help sell the last 430 cars before the introduction of the new Y30, fitted with either the turbocharged or the fuel injected L20 engine. This model approached the top Brougham's trim, but occupied a lower tax bracket and featured special two-tone paint.

The 2.0-litre turbocharged L20ET first appeared in the Cedric and its sister car, the Gloria in December 1979, a first for the Japanese market. Production actually began two months earlier. To receive official approval of this engine, Nissan focused attention on the energy saving capacities of the turbo engine. In another first for Japan, the naturally aspirated 280E received electronic fuel injection and the ECCS (Electronic Concentrated Engine Control System) engine management system. All of these firsts helped the 430-series Cedric/Gloria becoming named Japan's Car of The Year of 1979. The SGL-F trim level became available with the turbocharged engine from April 1981, which was also when the range received a facelift. At this time, power of the L28 engine climbed from 145 to 155 PS (107 to 114 kW); the L20E engine became equipped with ECCS as well at this time, which caused a slight power drop from 130 to 125 PS (96 to 92 kW) but with an increase in fuel economy.

The diesel engine that had been first introduced with the previous generation was complemented by a 2.8 L inline-six diesel, a first for the Japanese market. This, the LD28, was introduced in October 1979, somewhat later than petrol versions, and remained in production until September 1985. It was uncommonly quiet and comfortable for a diesel of this period, and found a large proportion of private buyers. It was originally only available with an automatic transmission; a five-speed model arrived in February 1980 (Vans and Wagons only received the manual option three months later). Mainly for taxi and fleet use the more frugal 2- and 2.2-litre four-cylinder SD-series diesel engines also remained available. These lower-spec models received four round headlights and the C-pillar window was made out of plastic rather than glass, as for the LPG-powered models with the 95 PS (70 kW) L20P engine.

=== Export markets ===
The 430 series Cedric was assembled and sold in Taiwan as the Yue Loong Cedric 2.0 and 2.4. At first codenamed 806, it became the 807 after a minor facelift.

This was the last Cedric to be sold in many European markets, as the more compact (but still roomy) Laurel was now available with the same diesel engine and suited European needs better.

In China, FAW-Hongqi was trying to find a smaller mid-size car to replace its old large Hongqi CA770 limousine. Since 1982, FAW was looking for a foreign partner, such as Audi, Nissan and Chrysler, to develop a mid-size car. As such, the Hongqi CA750 was developed as a prototype based on the Nissan Cedric. It did not enter production and only a small number of cars was built. Later, FAW would enter a venture with Chrysler and try to build the Dodge 600 as a replacement under the name Hongqi CA750F. Hongqi imported a couple of 600s and applied a new rear end and Hongqi badging, intending to sell them as the Hongqi CA750F in China. However, Volkswagen's long-term outlook convinced the Chinese otherwise and Hongqi chose to build the Audi 100 instead, albeit fitted with a locally built version of Chrysler's 2.2-liter inline-four.

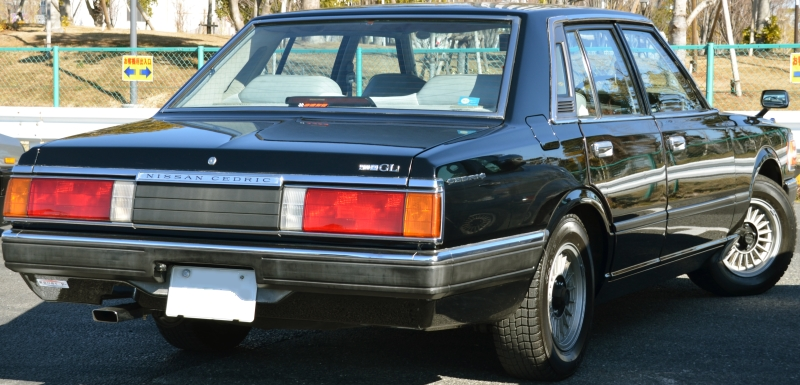
Nissan Cedric GL Sedan (430)

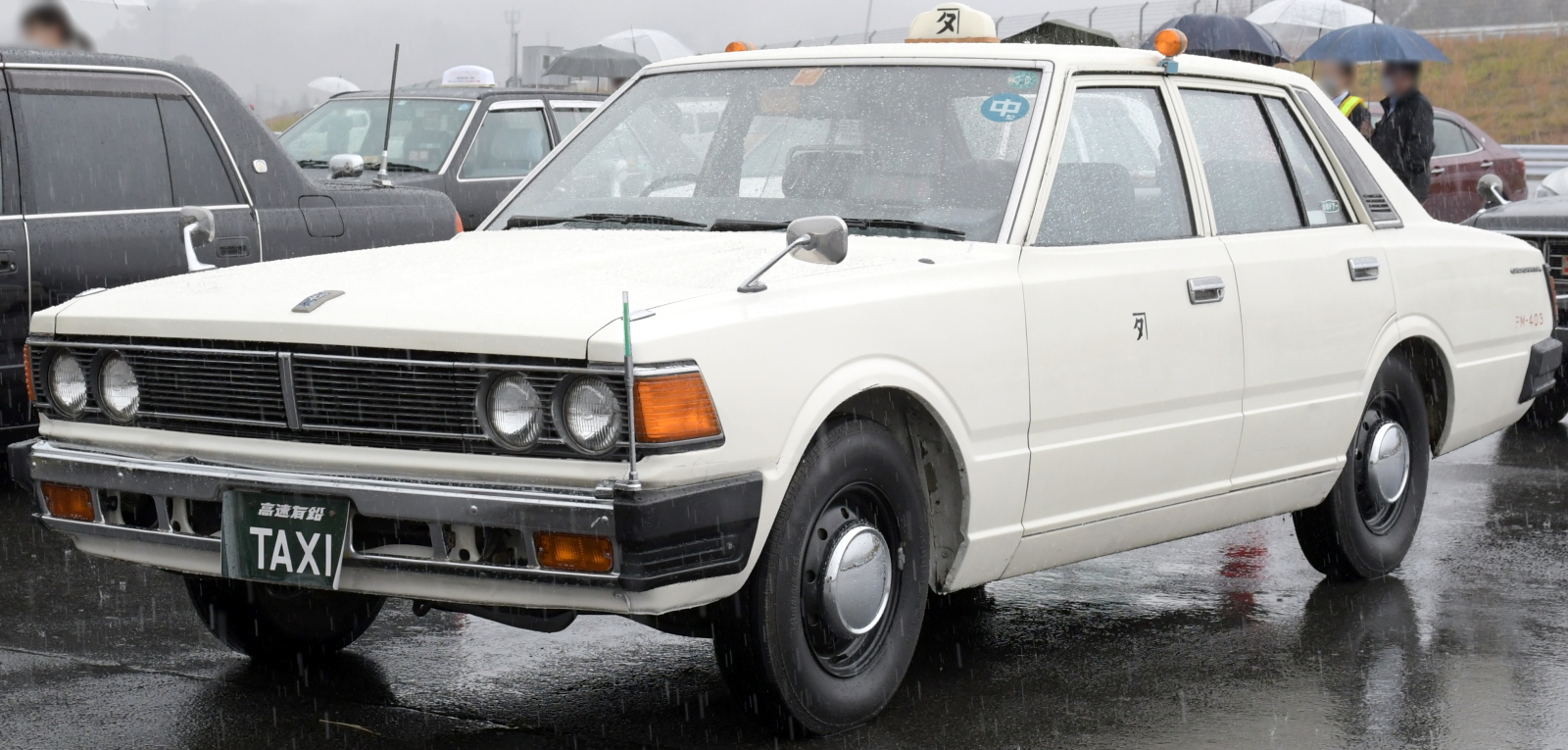
Nissan Cedric 200E Standard (430) with round headlights (for taxi use)

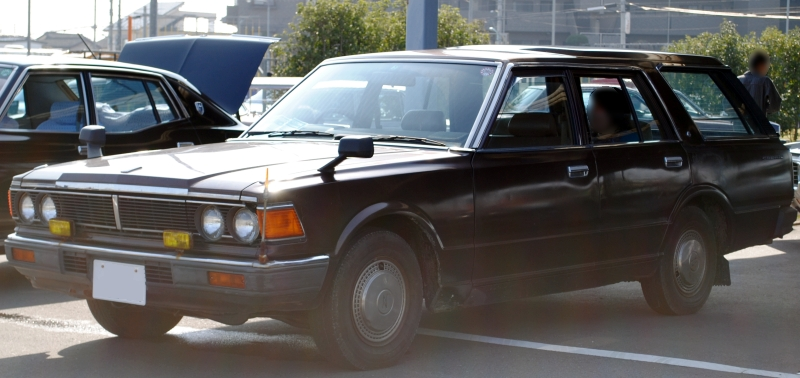
Nissan Cedric Wagon (430). Lower specification model with twin headlights.

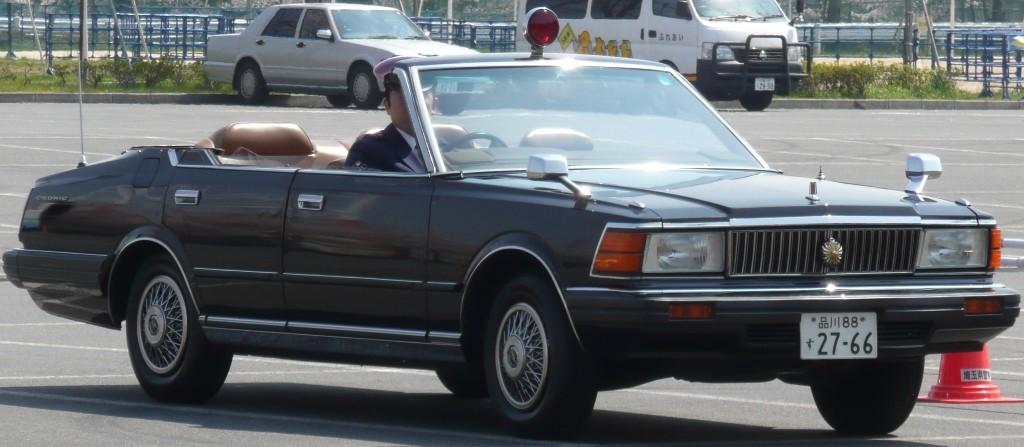
Nissan Cedric 280 Brougham Convertible (430)

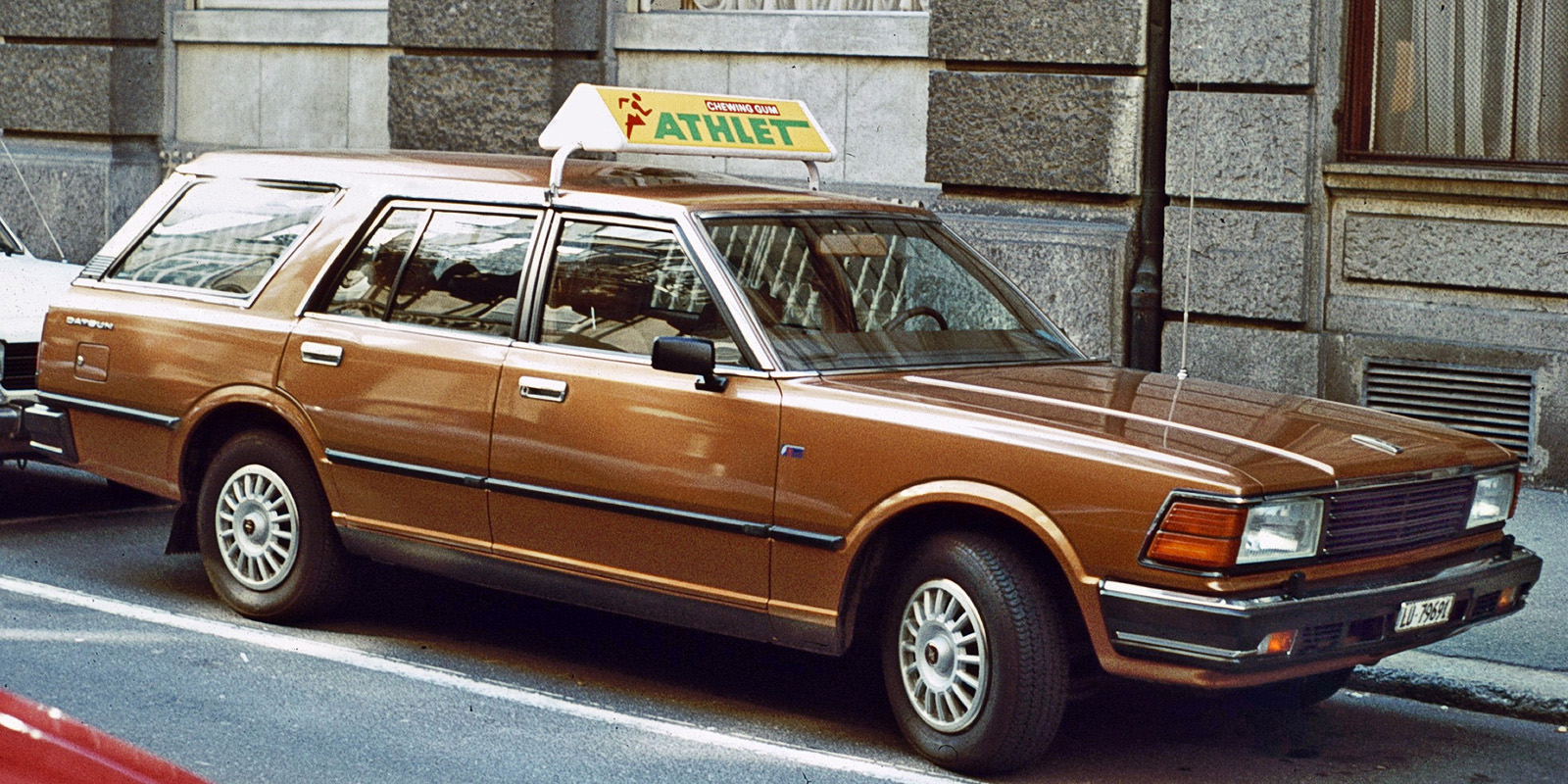
Datsun 280C Wagon (Export 430)

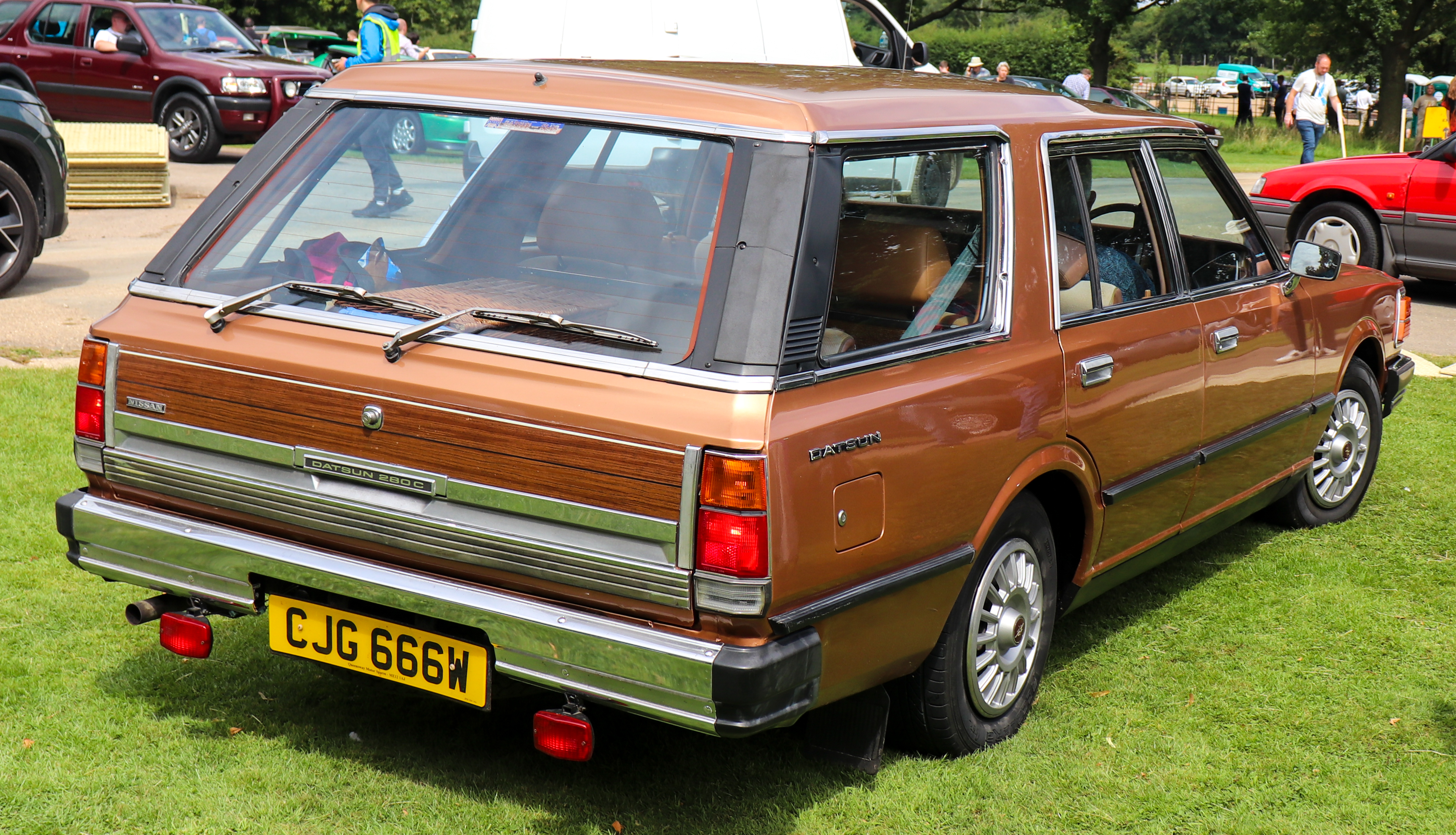
Datsun 280C Estate (430, UK)

== Sixth generation (Y30; 1983) ==
Nissan Cedric Y30
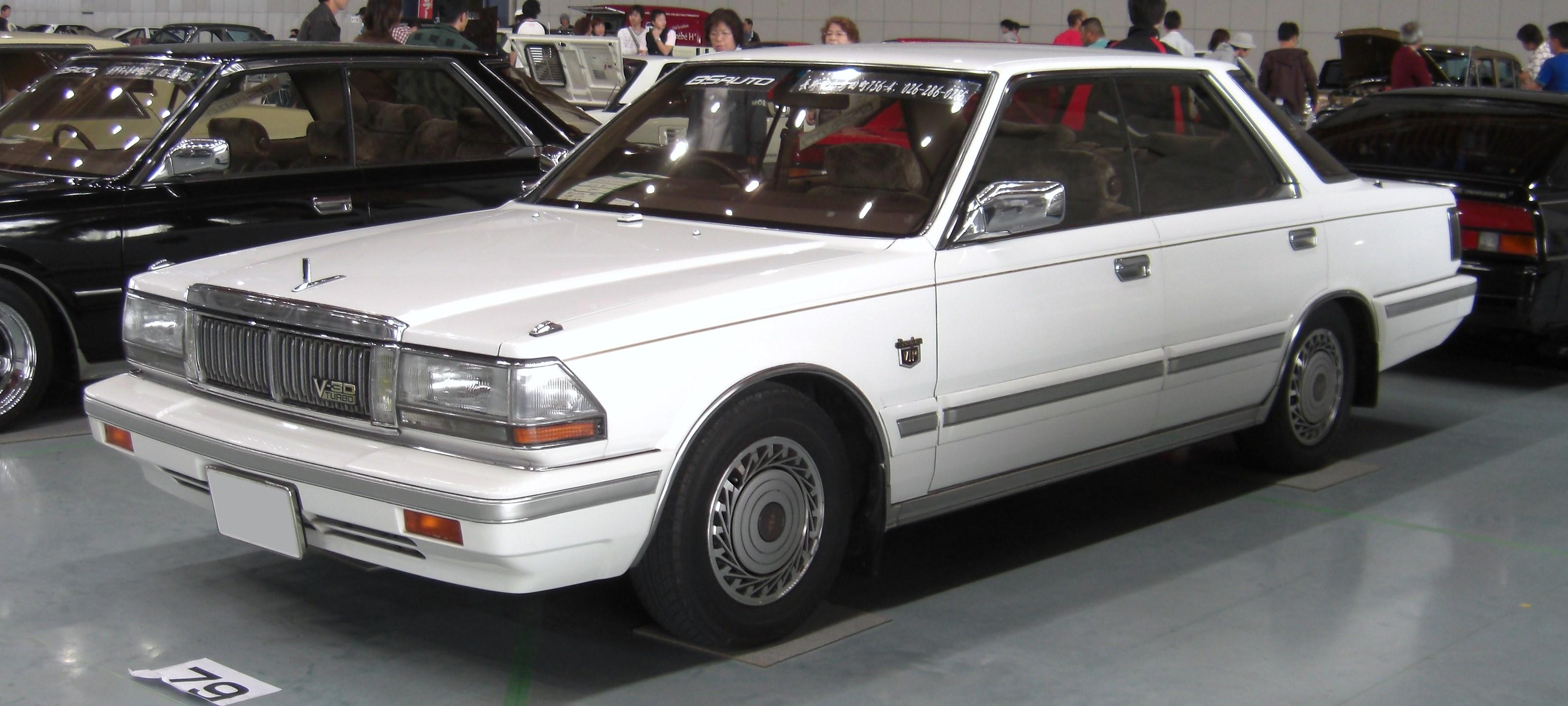
- Nissan Cedric 4 Door Hardtop V30 Turbo Brougham VIP

Overview
- Also called: Nissan Gloria; Nissan 300C; Yue Loong 830/Cedric 811 (TW); Yunbao YB6470 (China)
- Production: 1983–1987; 1983–1999 (wagon/van); 1990–1998 (China)
- Assembly: Japan: Kaminokawa, Tochigi; Taiwan: Miaoli; China: Guangdong

Body and chassis
- Body style: 4-door hardtop/sedan/wagon/van
- Layout: FR layout

Powertrain
- Engine: petrol: 2.0 L CA20S I4 (NY30); 2.0 L VG20E V6 (Y30); 2.0 L VG20ET turbo V6 (Y30); 3.0 L VG30S/VG30E V6 (PY30); 3.0 L VG30ET turbo V6 (PY30); LPG: 2.0 L CA20P I4 (NY30); 2.0 L L20P I6 (MY30); diesel: 2.3 L SD23 I4 (RY30; Asia export only); 2.5 L TD25 I4 (SY30; Asia export only); 2.8 L LD28 I6 (HY30); 2.8 L RD28 I6 (UY30)
- Transmission: 3/4-speed automatic; 4/5-speed manual

Dimensions
- Wheelbase: 2,730 mm (107.5 in)
- Length: 4,860 mm (191.3 in) (3.0 L); 4,690 mm (184.6 in)
- Width: 1,720 mm (67.7 in) (3.0 L); 1,695 mm (66.7 in)
- Height: 1,425 mm (56.1 in)
- Curb weight: 1,475–1,610 kg (3,252–3,549 lb)

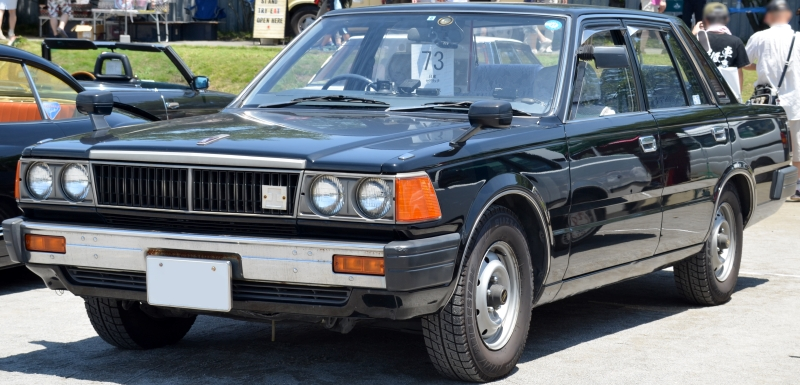
Nissan Cedric Standard Sedan with round headlight (Japan)

The Y30 was sold from June 1983 through 1987. The diesel engine was popular for taxis in Japan, Singapore, and Hong Kong. In Taiwan, the Y30 was sold as the Yue Loong Cedric 811 with a 2-litre four, or as the Cedric 830 with the three-litre VG30 six.

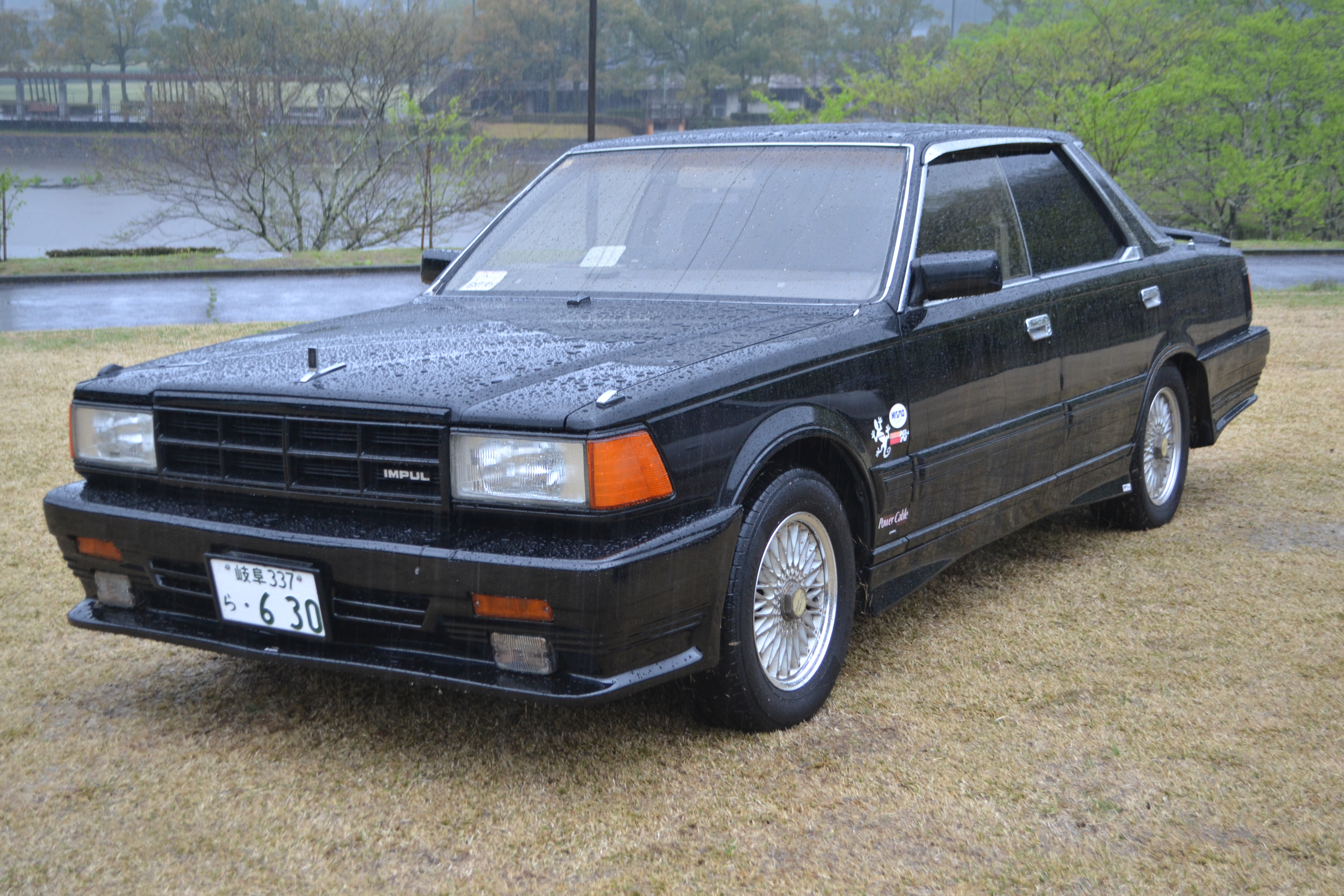
Nissan Cedric Hardtop Impul 630R (PY30, Japan)

This generation saw the introduction of the PLASMA engine family VG series V6, which was inspired by an Alfa Romeo design due to a partnership that Nissan and Alfa Romeo had at the time. The Cedric was offered in three bodystyles; four-door hardtop, four-door sedan and station wagon. The trim level packages were numerous and offered increasing amounts of technology and convenience features on top level platforms. The top level package for the hardtop was called the V30 Turbo Brougham VIP, followed by V30Turbo/V30E Brougham, V20 Turbo Brougham, V20 Turbo F, V20 Turbo/V20E/28D-6 SGL, and V20E/28D-6 GL. The top sedan trim package in the home market was the V30 Turbo Brougham VIP. Below it sat the V30 Turbo/V30E Brougham, the V20 Turbo Brougham, the V20 Turbo/V20E/28D-6 SGL, the V20E Custom Deluxe, the Deluxe/28D-6 Deluxe, and the Standard. The lower grade variants were mainly available for professional use. The installation of a turbocharger was to provide better fuel economy and reduce tailpipe emissions as the Japanese pay a tax on the amount of emissions their car produces.

Beginning with the June 1985 facelift, Nissan offered a self-levelling suspension for the rear wheels on hardtop and sedan top trim packages. They also introduced "Super Sonic Suspension" system, which featured a sonar module mounted under the front bumper that scanned the road surface and adjusted the suspension accordingly via actuators mounted on all four MacPherson strut towers. There was also a switch next to the steering wheel that allowed the driver to change between "Auto", "Soft", "Medium" and "Hard" settings. The speed-sensitive rack-and-pinion power steering could also be separately reduced for a sporting feeling, and the suspension setting would modify both the steering feel and the shift points on the automatic transmission. The feature was only installed on V30 Turbo Brougham VIP sedans and hardtops.

On the 4-door hardtop, the front driver and passenger seat belt shoulder strap was connected at the top to the ceiling, however, the upper portion could be detached, with the shoulder strap resting on the driver's and front passenger's shoulder without the seat belt hanging from the ceiling. The upper part would then swing up to the ceiling and could be fastened into place. This arrangement provided an additional benefit to the rear seat passenger opposite the driver because the front passenger seat could be pushed forward with the head restraint removed, providing the rear seat passengers an unobstructed view through the front windshield, and both side view windows, adding to the luxurious feel of a hardtop luxury sedan.

Nissan introduced a PIN activated keyless entry feature on the front exterior door handles. The doors could be unlocked, trunk opened and all windows retracted, as well as rolling up the windows and locking the vehicle. At the time of the 1985 facelift, the V20 Turbo Urban and Urban X replaced the earlier Turbo S and Turbo F variants. Less baroque than the earlier F, the Urban models were more dynamic and driver oriented, featuring modern alloy wheels and the new Super Sonic suspension system.

The level of comfort, convenience items and chassis technology was vast in relation to other products offered at the time, and the buyer could choose from seemingly endless options. Some of the items included a digitally synthesized AM stereo/FM stereo radio tuner with the ability to listen to broadcast TV stations, and a cassette tape player with recording feature to function as a dictaphone, stereo and cruise control buttons integrated into a fixed position steering wheel hub, and sonar-based backup sensors installed in the rear bumper. Rear seat passengers were also pampered, with the ability to control the stereo and climate control functions from a control pad located at the leading edge of the rear seat armrest, that could be dislodged from the armrest and function as a hand-held remote, along with separate reclining seat and backrest combined with a cellphone located inside the armrest compartment.

The Wagon and Van versions continued in production after the introduction of the succeeding Y31, Y32, and Y33 versions, with the Wagon version ending production in August 1999. The wagon trim packages were the V20E SGL at the top, with an optional DI-NOC woodgrain appearance, the V20E/28D-6 GL, and the V20E Deluxe. Wagons (intended for private buyers) were mainly available with the 115 PS (85 kW) VG20E petrol unit and the 94 PS (69 kW) RD28 diesel engine (until March 1994). The rear compartment opposite the driver had a rear quarter window that could be opened or closed from the outside by inserting the ignition key in addition to opening the rear tailgate from the back.

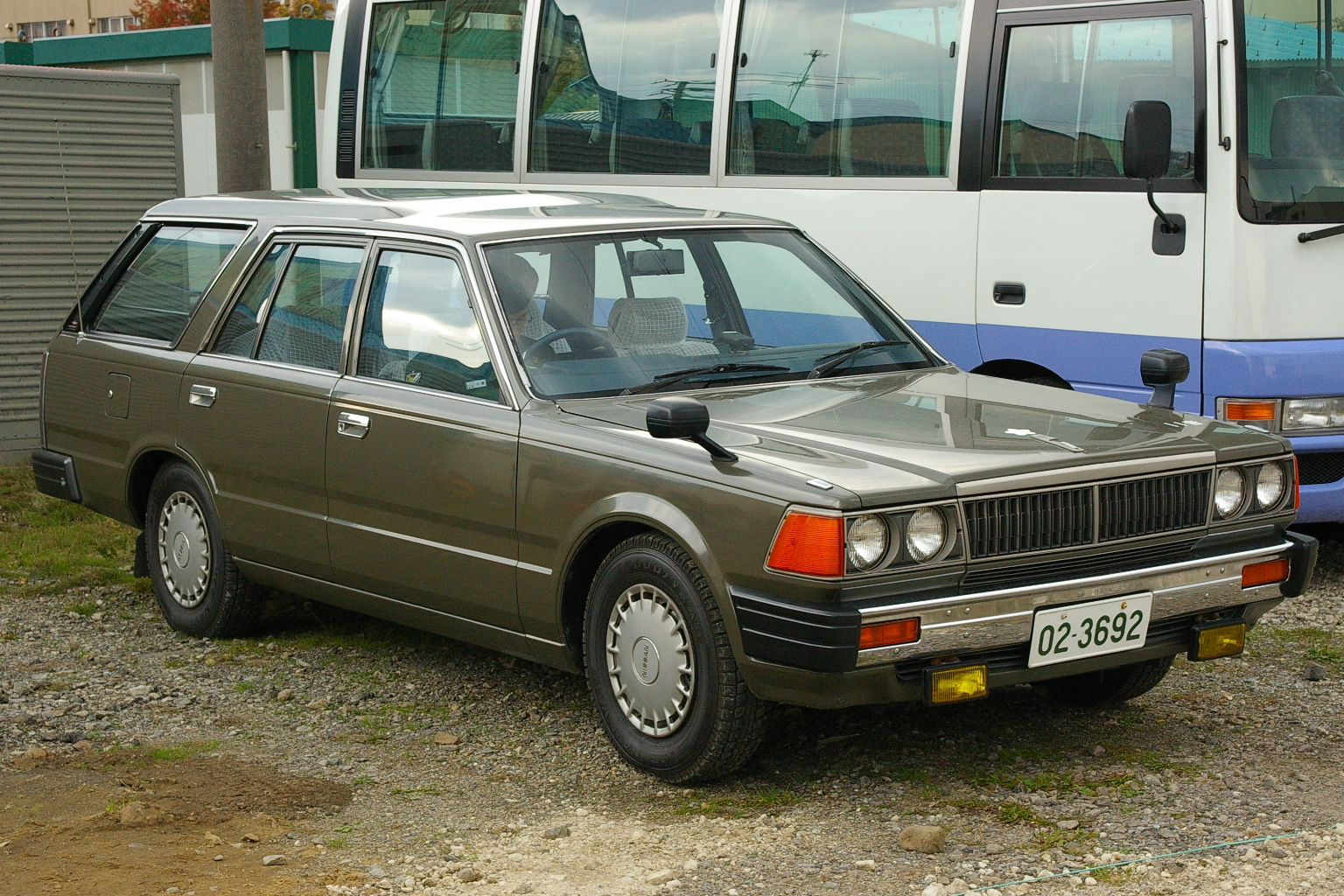
Y30 series Nissan Cedric V20 E Deluxe (JGSDF vehicle)

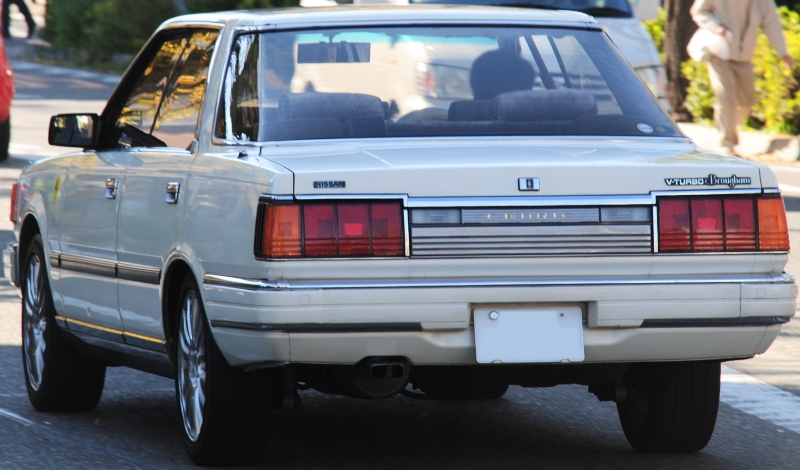
Nissan Cedric Hardtop V-Turbo Brougham (Y30, Japan)

=== Export models ===
In Asian export markets, where the Cedric was popular as a taxi, it was available with a four-cylinder diesel engine. Initially, these were equipped with the old-fashioned, 2.3-litre SD23 engine, an enlarged variant of an engine first fitted to the Cedric in 1964. The SD23 was replaced by the new, somewhat larger TD25 engine around the time of the mid-1985 facelift.

=== Nissan 300C (export) ===
In European and many other export markets, the Y30 Cedric was sold as the Nissan 300C beginning in 1984, continuing the naming system established in the beginning of the 1970s. It was meant to target the German luxury executive cars that dominated the class in the 1980s; the slightly less luxurious station wagon aimed for the Volvo and Mercedes-Benz station wagons.

It used the 3.0 L (2,960 cc) VG30E V6 engine and either a 5-speed manual or a 4-speed automatic. Fitted with the automatic with overdrive gearbox, the saloon had a max speed of 120 mph (193 km/h), with 0-60 mph (97 km/h) being achieved in about 8.4 seconds. The interior was trimmed in moquette cloth and featured adjustable front seats, adjustable steering wheel, power steering, air conditioning, tinted windows, and a LW/MW/FM stereo/cassette player. The sedan featured the same independent front suspension as the wagon, but had a five-link suspension system at the rear for improved ride quality.

The wagon's primary differences were a five-speed manual gearbox, and no air conditioning (for the UK market). The estate had steel wheels and rear drum brakes instead of the saloon's discs, and had one less exhaust silencer. It was altogether a less luxurious but more rugged car. There is a flip-up rear-facing seat in the cargo area, technically making the 300C wagon a seven-seater.

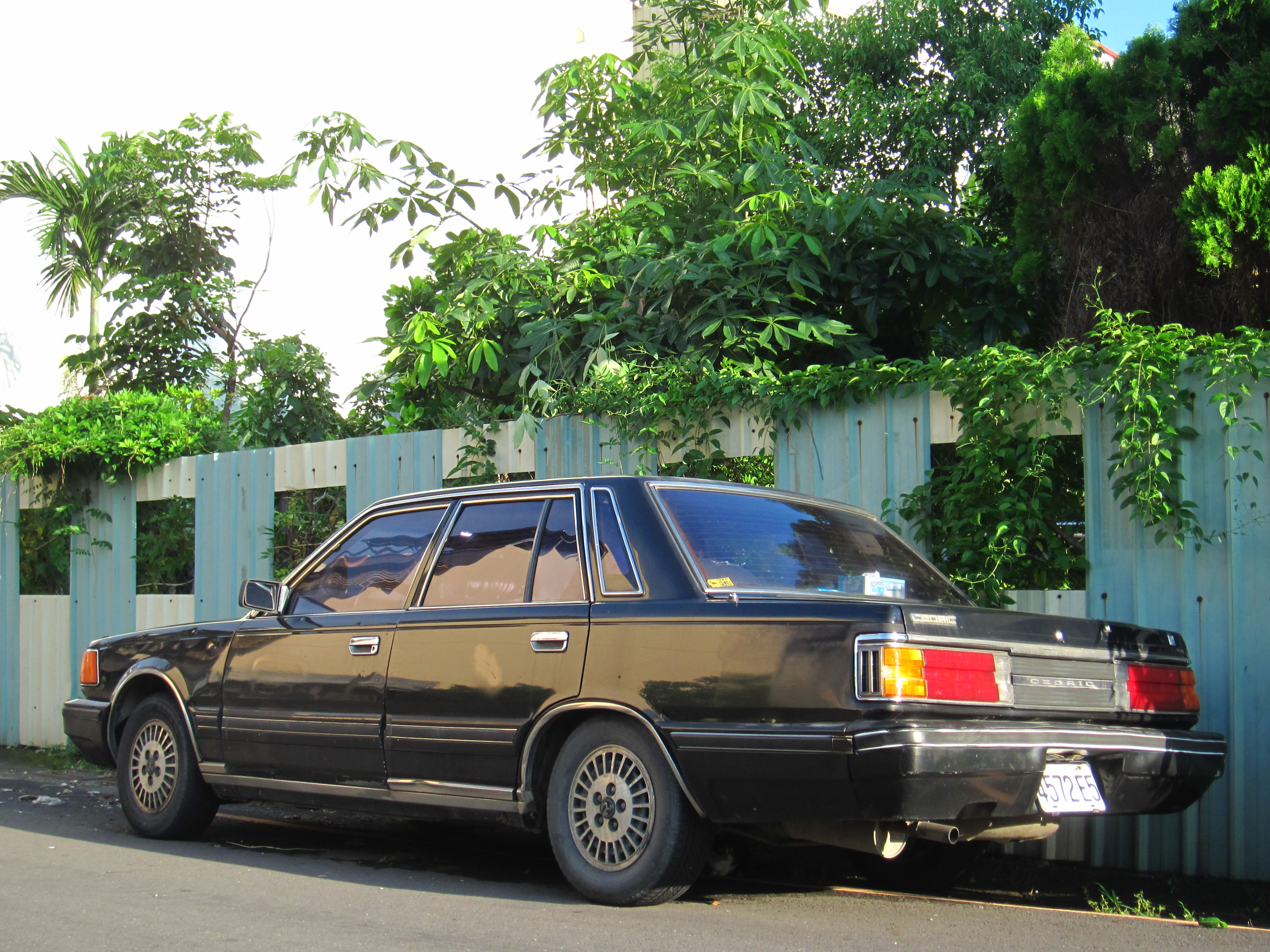
Yue Loong Cedric Sedan (Taiwan)

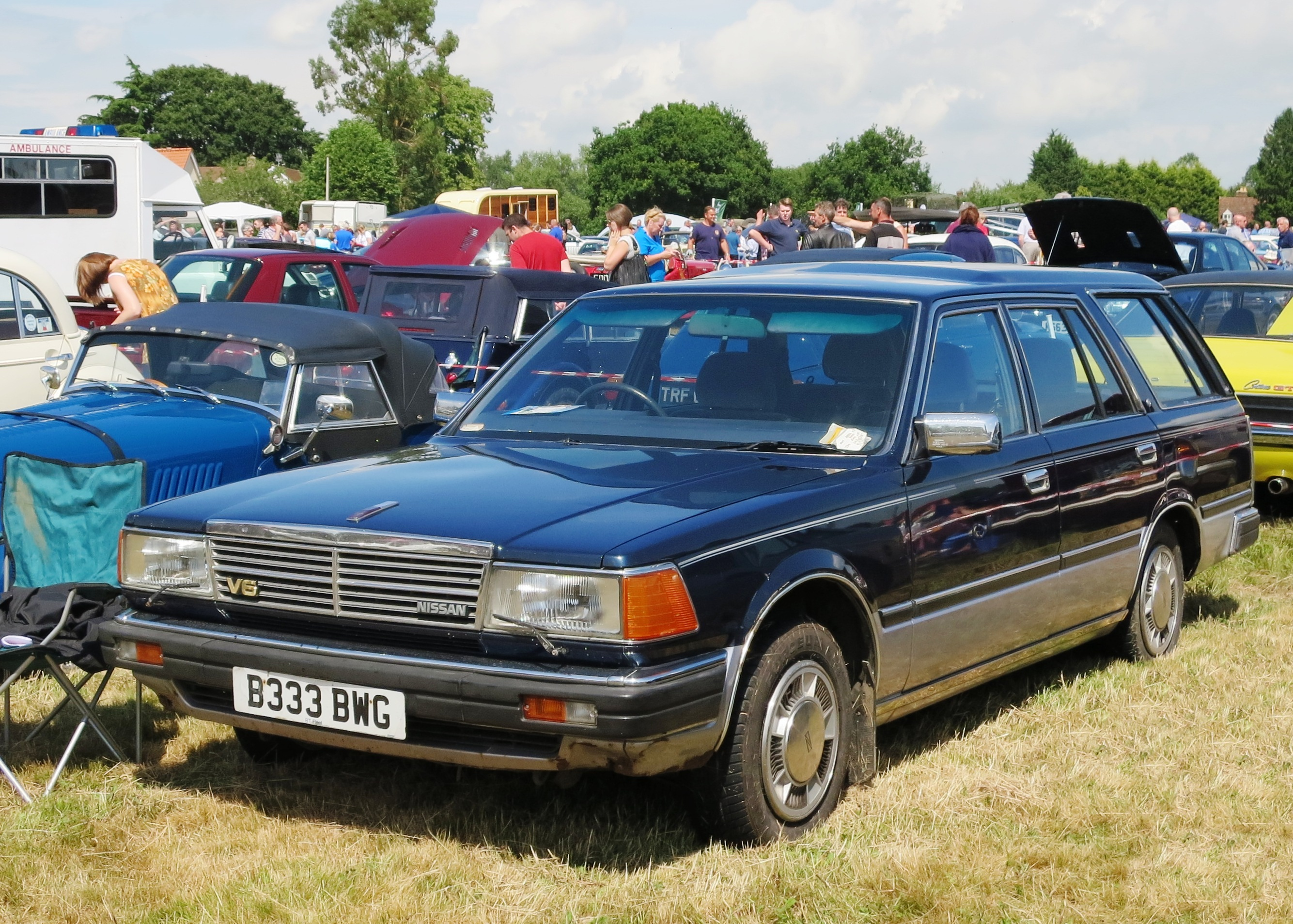
Nissan 300C Estate (Europe)

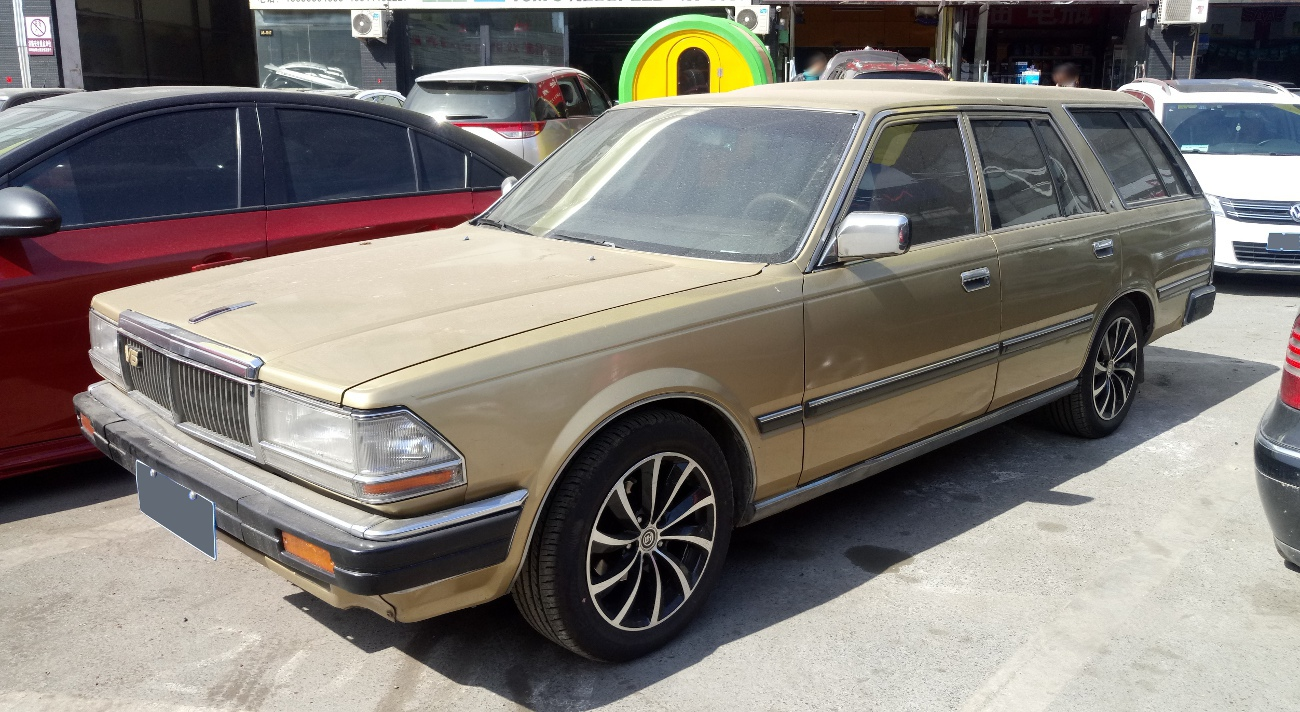
Yunbao YB6470 (China)

=== China ===
In 1993, Great Wall started building clones of the Y30 (popular as an import) under the name CC1020. These were sometimes built on the underpinnings of the Beijing BJ212. From 1990 until 1998, Guangzhou-Yunbao also built the Y30 station wagon from Japanese CKD kits as the YB6470. The Yunbao came with the 2.0-litre VG20E engine, producing 96 kW (131 PS; 129 hp).

== Seventh generation (Y31; 1987) ==
Nissan Cedric Y31
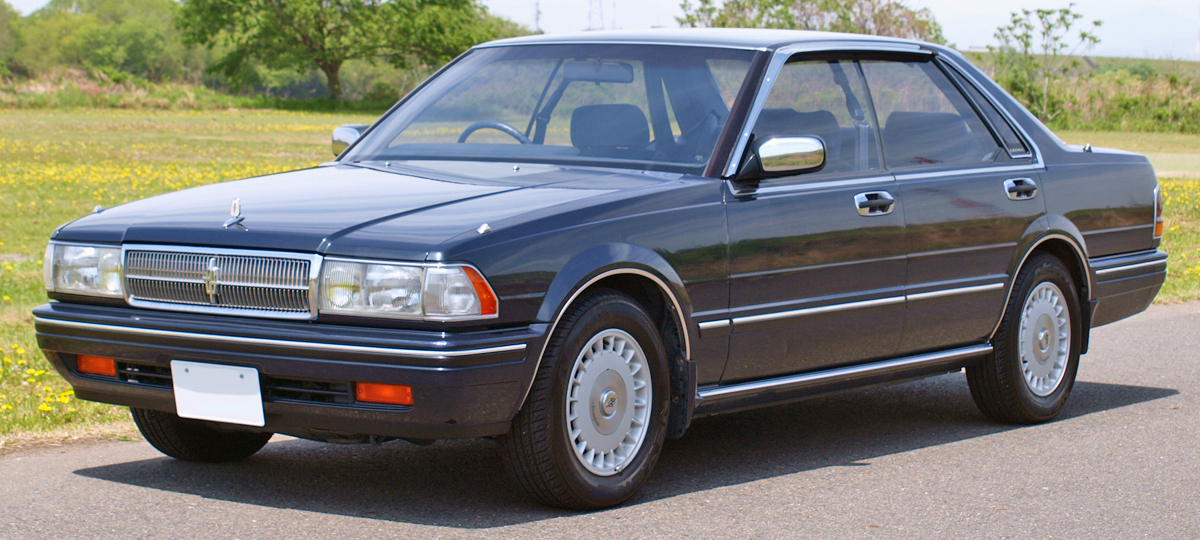
- 1987 Nissan Cedric Hardtop V20 Twincam Brougham

Overview
- Also called: Nissan Gloria
- Production: 1987–1991 (hardtop); 1987–2002 (sedan, fleet only until 2014)
- Assembly: Japan: Kaminokawa, Tochigi

Body and chassis
- Body style: 4-door hardtop/sedan
- Layout: FR layout
- Related: Nissan Crew; Nissan Cedric Cima Y31

Powertrain
- Engine: Petrol: 2.0 L VG20E V6; 2.0 L VG20DET DOHC turbo V6; 3.0 L VG30S/VG30E V6; 3.0 L VG30ET turbo V6; 3.0 L VG30DE DOHC V6; LPG: 2.0 L CA20P I4; 2.0 L NA20P/PE I4; 2.0 L VG20P V6; 2.0 L RB20P I6; diesel: 2.5 L TD25 I4; 2.7 L TD27 I4; 2.8 L RD28/RD28E I6; 3.2 L QD32 I4 (Indonesia only)
- Transmission: 4/5-speed automatic; 4/5-speed manual

Dimensions
- Wheelbase: 2,735 mm (107.7 in)
- Length: 4,690 mm (184.6 in); 4,860 mm (191.3 in) (3.0 L)
- Width: 1,695 mm (66.7 in); 1,720 mm (67.7 in) (3.0 L)
- Height: 1,380 mm (54.3 in) (3.0 L); 1,405 mm (55.3 in)
- Curb weight: 1,540–1,450 kg (3,395–3,197 lb)

The Y31 was built from June 1987 through 1991 for private use, available as either Sedan or Hardtop versions. This generation was one of Nissan's most popular series, as the Japanese economy was robust before the advent of the Japanese asset price bubble deflation in mid-1991. As a result of Project 901, the styling of this generation was more rounded, and additional attention was given to luxury accommodations and optional features. The trim packages were similar to the previous generation, with some changes. The top-level package for the hardtop was the V30 Turbo Brougham VIP, followed by the V30E Brougham VIP, V30 Brougham, V20 Twincam Turbo Brougham, RD28 Brougham, Classic SV (V20E or RD28 engine), Classic (V20E or RD28 engine), V20 Twincam Turbo Grand Turismo SV, V20 Twincam Turbo Gran Turismo, ending with the V20E Gran Turismo. The sporty Gran Turismo version has short bumpers with a body kit and is powered by a 2.0-liter VG20DET engine, which replaced the previous generation's Urban/Urban X. The previous SGL and GL models were replaced by the new Classic designation.

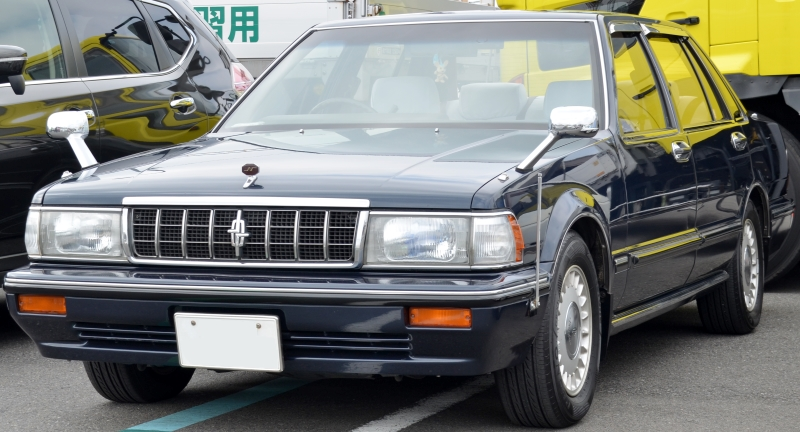
1989 Cedric V30E Brougham L

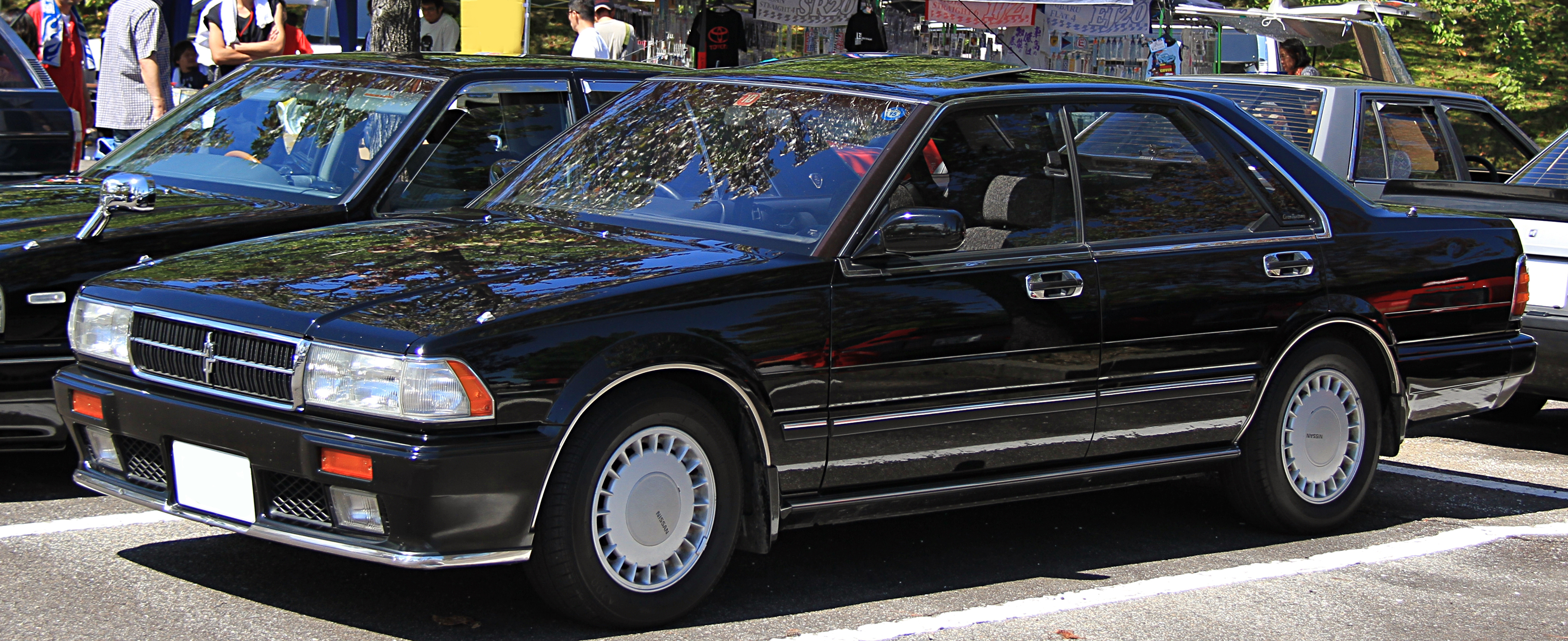
1989 Cedric V20 Twin Cam Turbo Gran Turismo SV

The Sedan version of the Y31 received a light facelift at the launch of the Hardtop Y32, and it was still in production up to 2015 for the Japanese rental fleet and taxi markets. The trim packages for the sedan started with the V30 Turbo Brougham VIP, the V30E Brougham VIP, V30E Brougham, V20 Twincam Turbo Brougham, RD28 Brougham, Classic SV (V20E or RD28 engine), Classic (V20E or RD28 engine), with the base model Supercustom (V20E or RD28 engine). The Brougham VIP package had three separate technology upgrade packages (Grade I, II, III), while the Brougham had two for the sedan and hardtop. A limited edition long-wheelbase model was built by Autech.

As before, the options list was extensive. New items that appeared were the replacement of a broadcast TV tuner with a Sony CD player coupled with JBL speakers and a humidifier for backseat passengers. "Super Sonic Suspension" was no longer offered, and instead, the MacPherson struts were optionally installed with internal air chambers combined with trailing lower control arms. In contrast, the standard suspension consisted of MacPherson struts for the front wheels and coil springs and shock absorbers for the rear suspension. A cellular phone continued to offer hands-free convenience by dialing the phone number on an integrated keypad on the stationary steering wheel hub, with the handset inside the front armrest compartment. In June 1989 the Nissan Cedric with the VG20DET offered the world's first full range electronically controlled 5-speed automatic transmission, the Jatco 5R01. At the same time, the engine received an intercooler and a resulting power increase from 185 to 210 PS (136 to 154 kW).

The wagon and van versions of the previous Y30 Cedric remained in production alongside the Y31 sedan and Y32/Y33 Hardtops. The wagon finally ended its run in August 1999, ceding load-carrying abilities to the Cedric-based Nissan Presage. The six-cylinder diesel engine was also updated in August 1999, changing to the cleaner and somewhat more powerful RD28E engine which has an electronically controlled, distributor-type fuel injection pump.

A sedan version for fleet use was released in 1991. The fleet model Y31 ended production in 2014 and was last updated in June 2012.

Engines:

- 2.0 L VG20E (VG20P LPG version until 2007.07)
- 2.0 L VG20DET (DOHC turbocharged)
- 3.0 L VG30E
- 3.0 L VG30DE (DOHC)
- 3.0 L VG30ET (turbocharged)
- 2.0 L RB20P 6-cylinder LPG (until 2002.06)
- 2.0 L CA20P 4-cylinder LPG (1987–1991.06)
- 2.0 L NA20P/PE 4-cylinder LPG (since 1991.06, NA20PE from 2010.09)
- 2.7 L TD27 4-cylinder diesel (Asian exports only, until 2000)
- 2.8 L RD28 diesel, 94 PS (69 kW) at 4,800 rpm (until 1999.08)
- 2.8 L RD28E diesel, 100 PS (74 kW) at 4,800 rpm (1999.08–2002.06)
- 3.2 L QD32 4-cylinder diesel (Exclusively for Indonesian Silver Bird Taxi fleet)
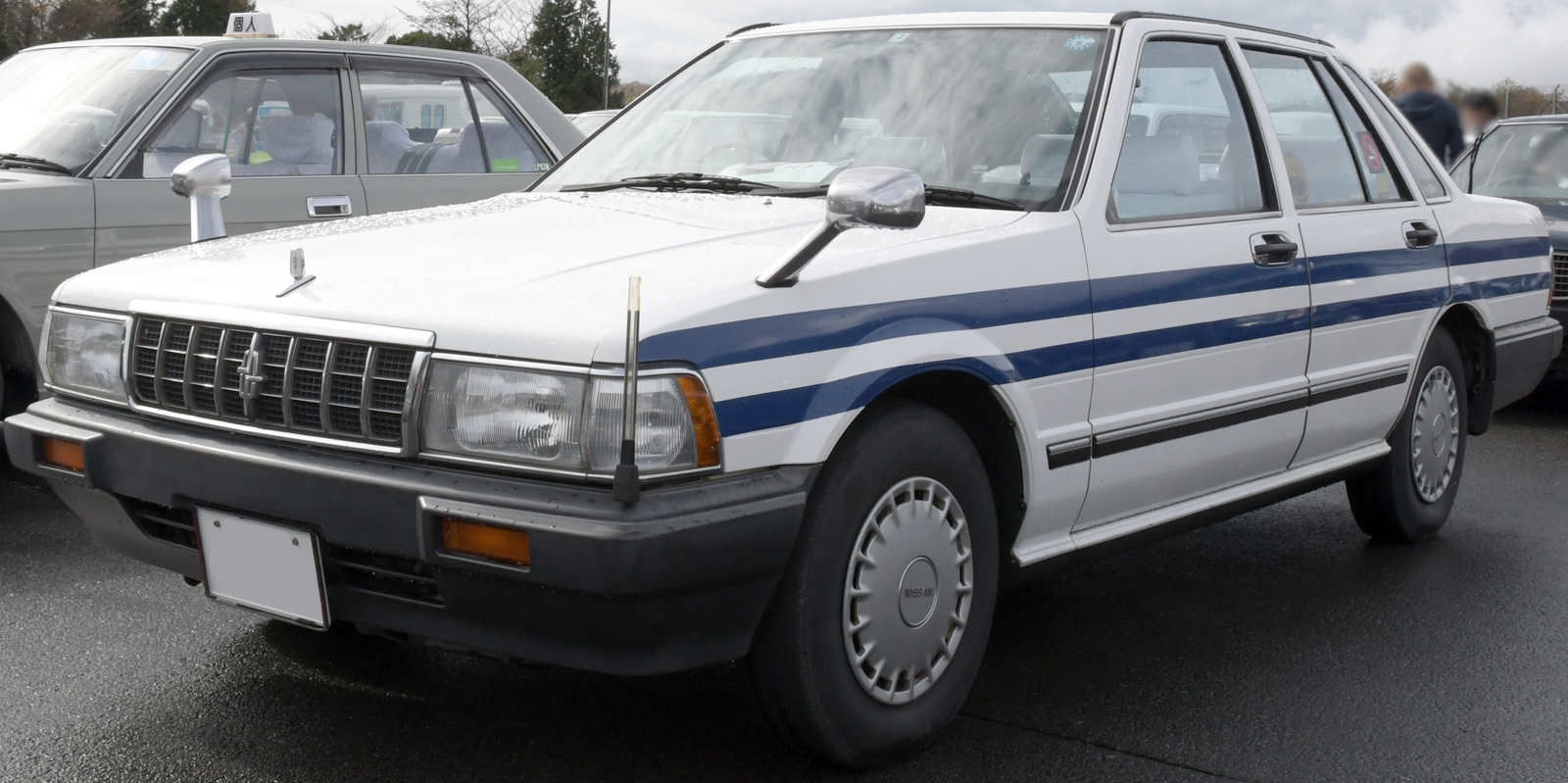
1989 Cedric Sedan Custom (NJY31)

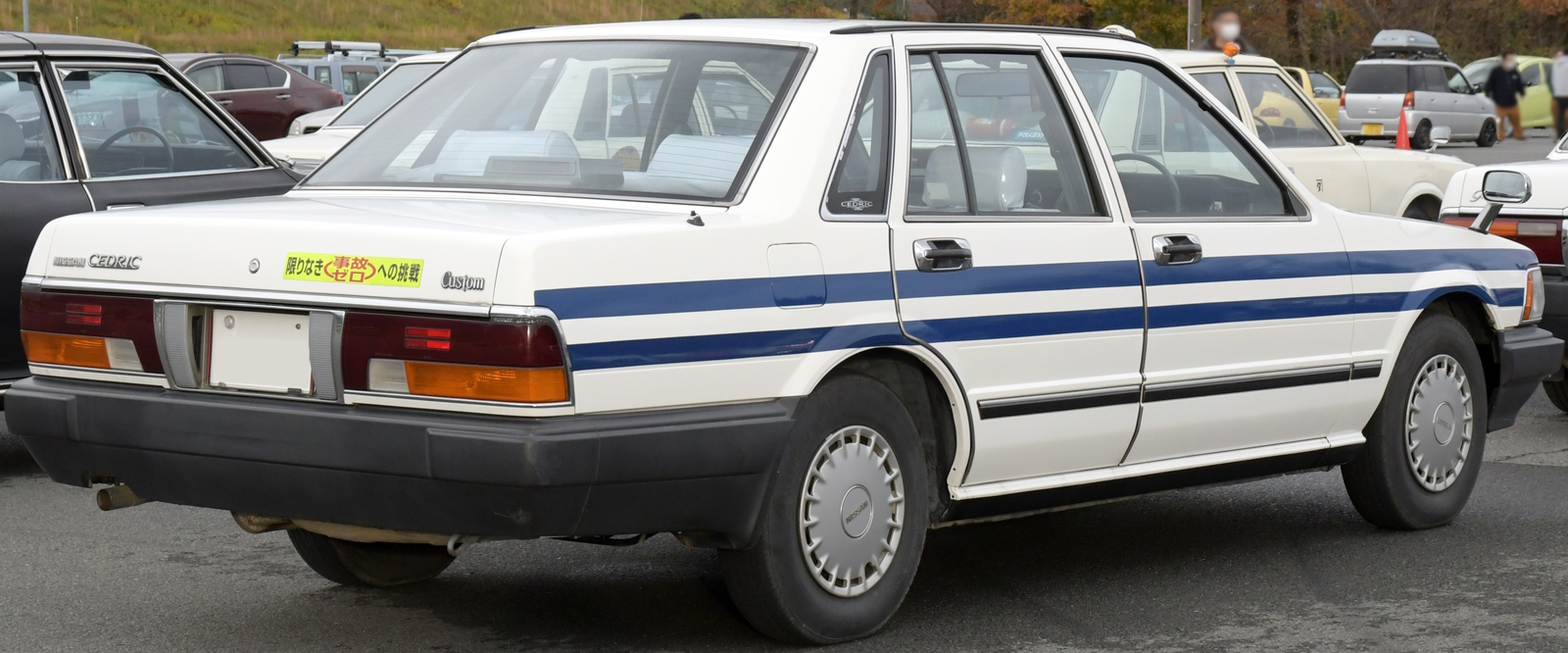
1989 Cedric Sedan Custom (NJY31)

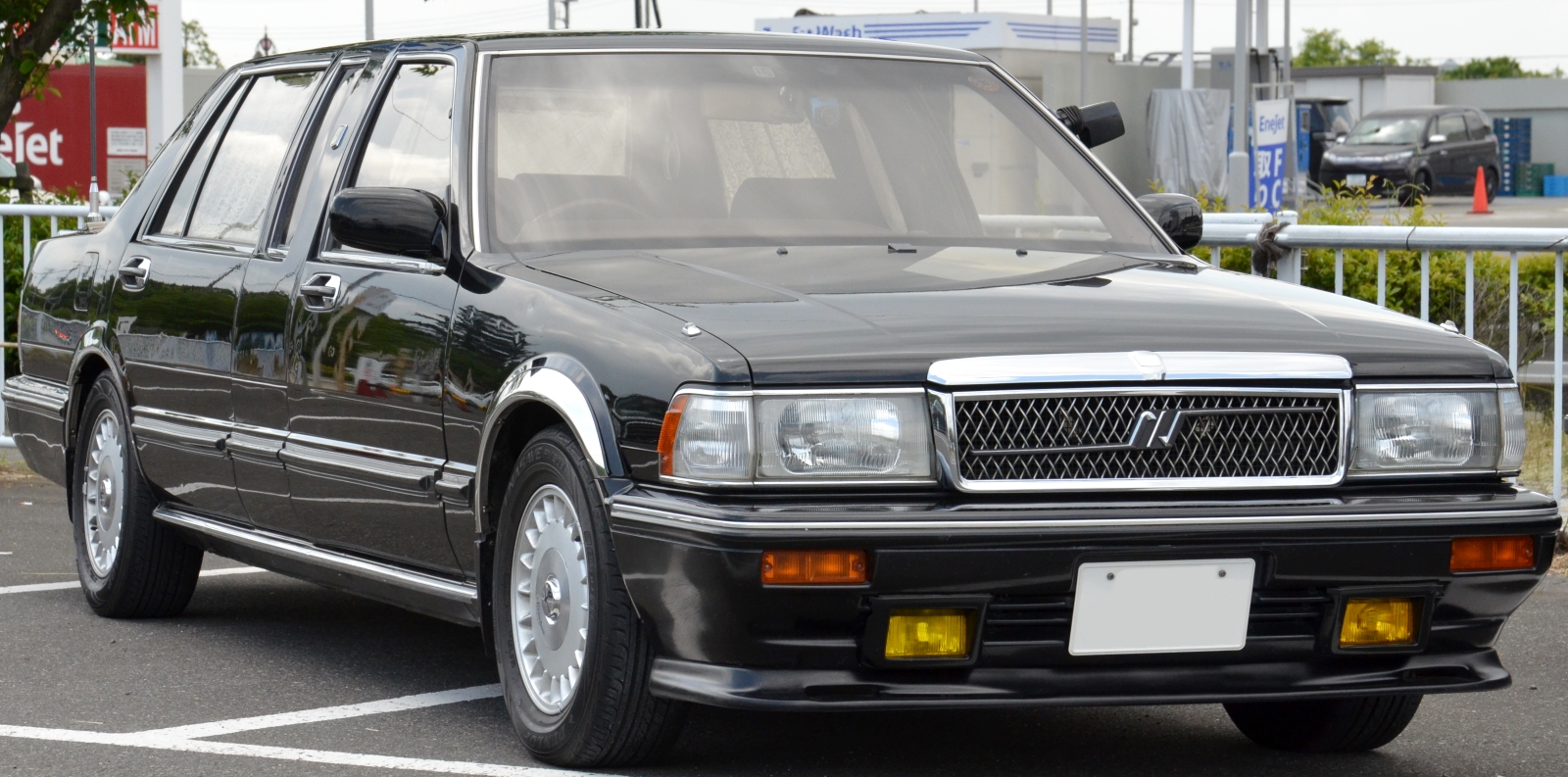
Nissan Cedric Royal Limousine

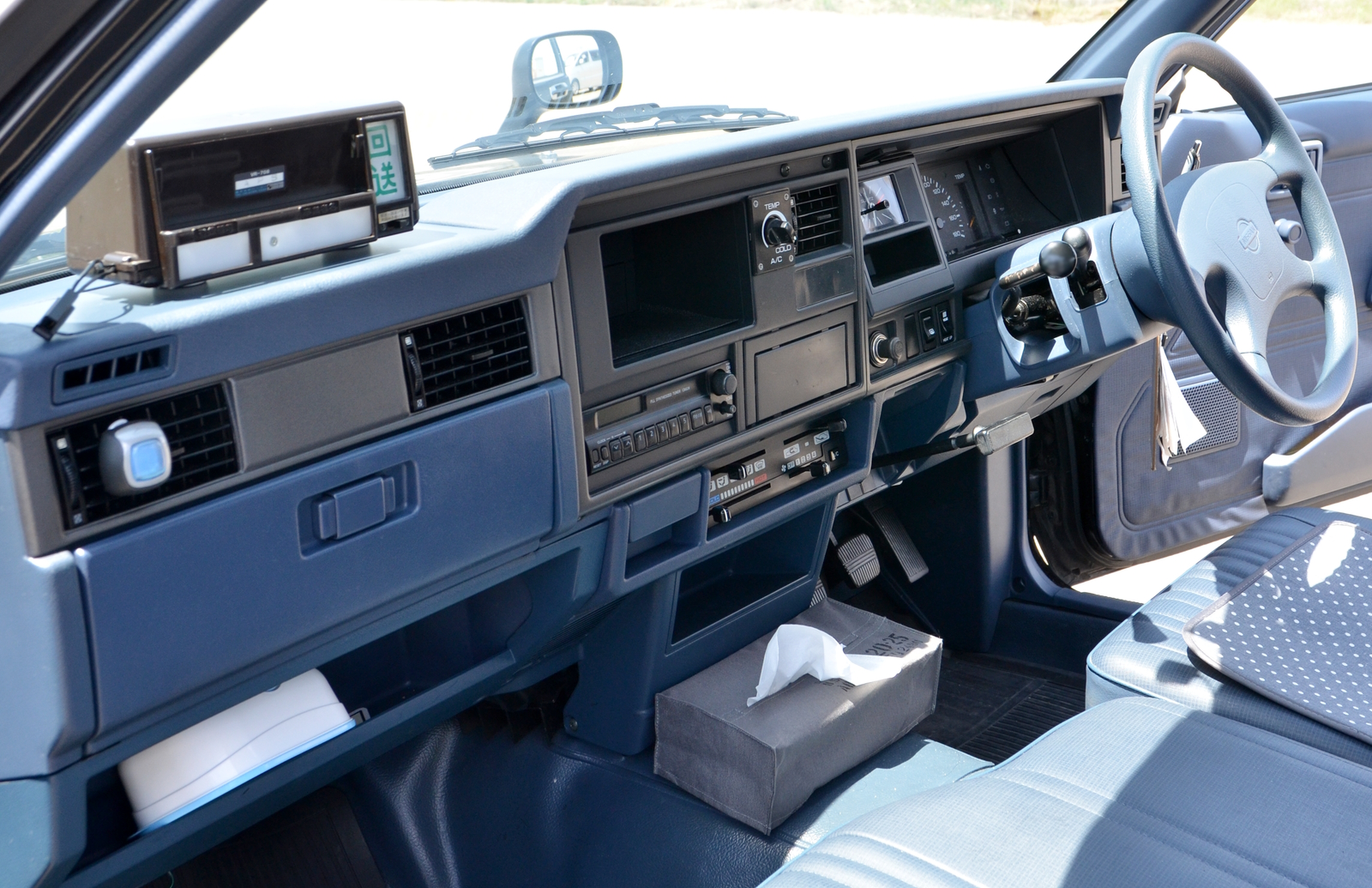
Nissan Cedric standard (QJY31) interior

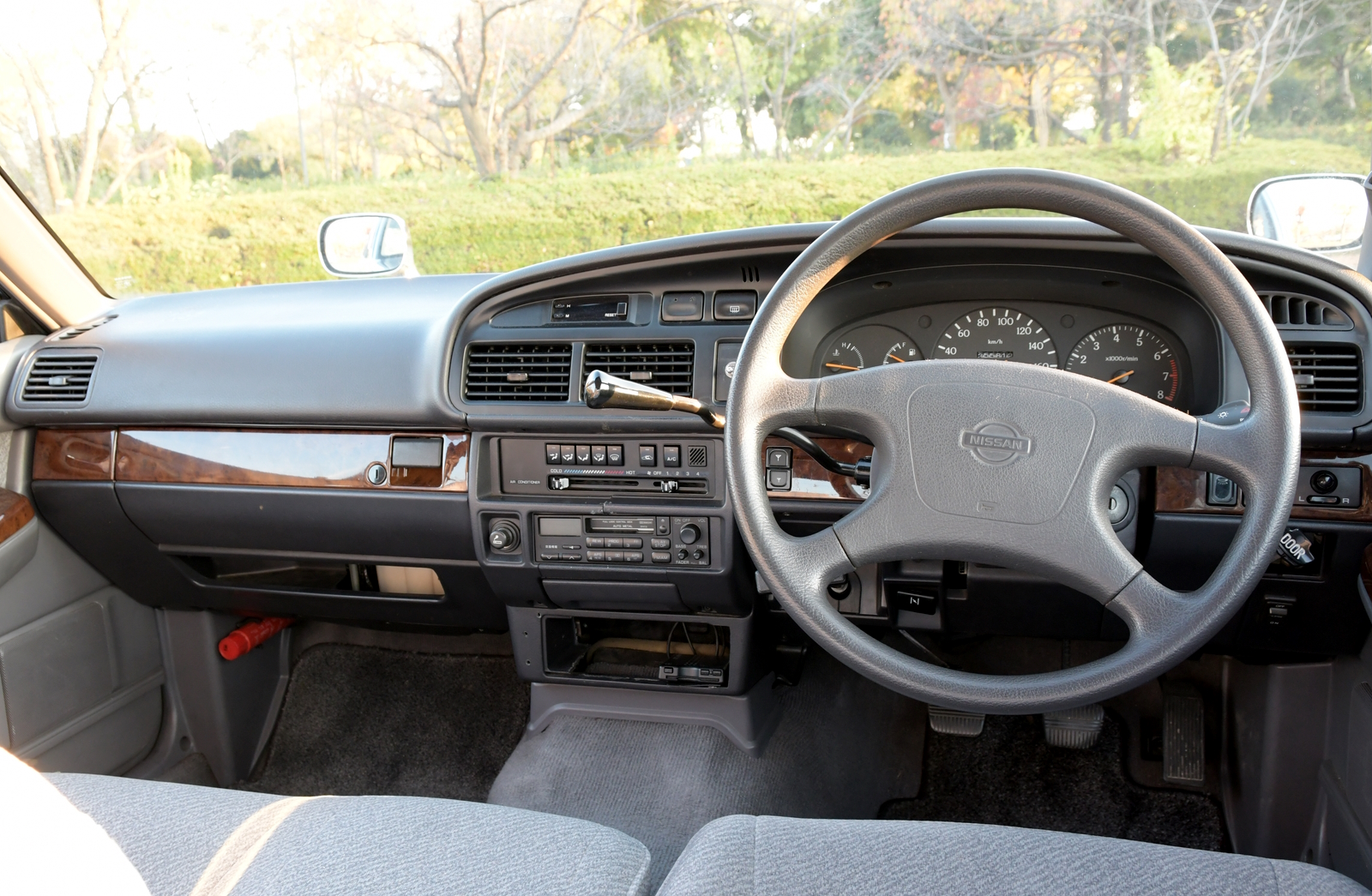
Nissan Cedric Classic (MJY31) interior

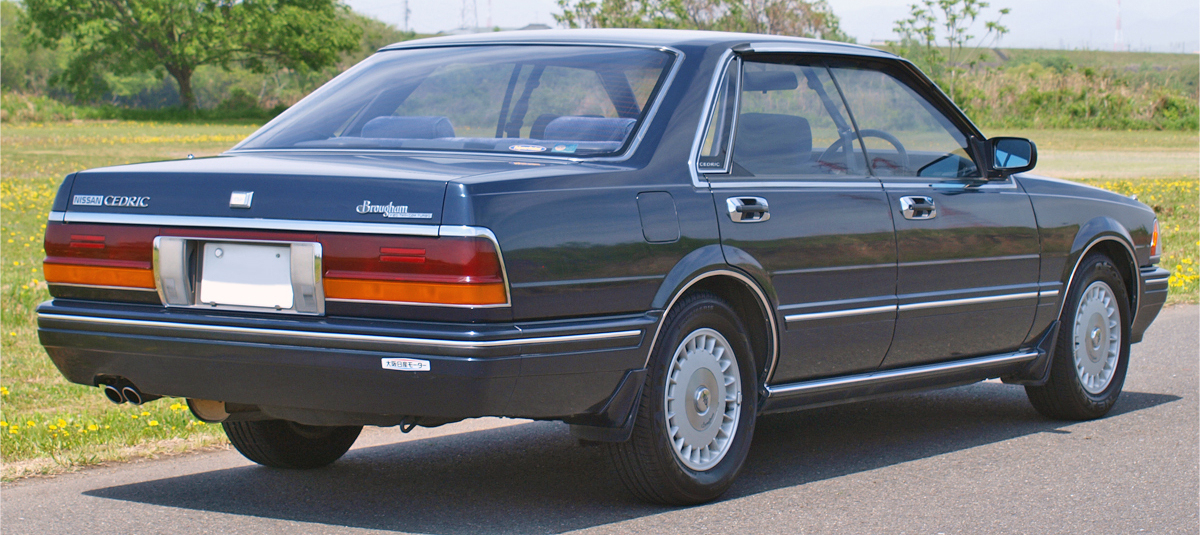
1987 Cedric Hardtop V20 Twincam Brougham rear view

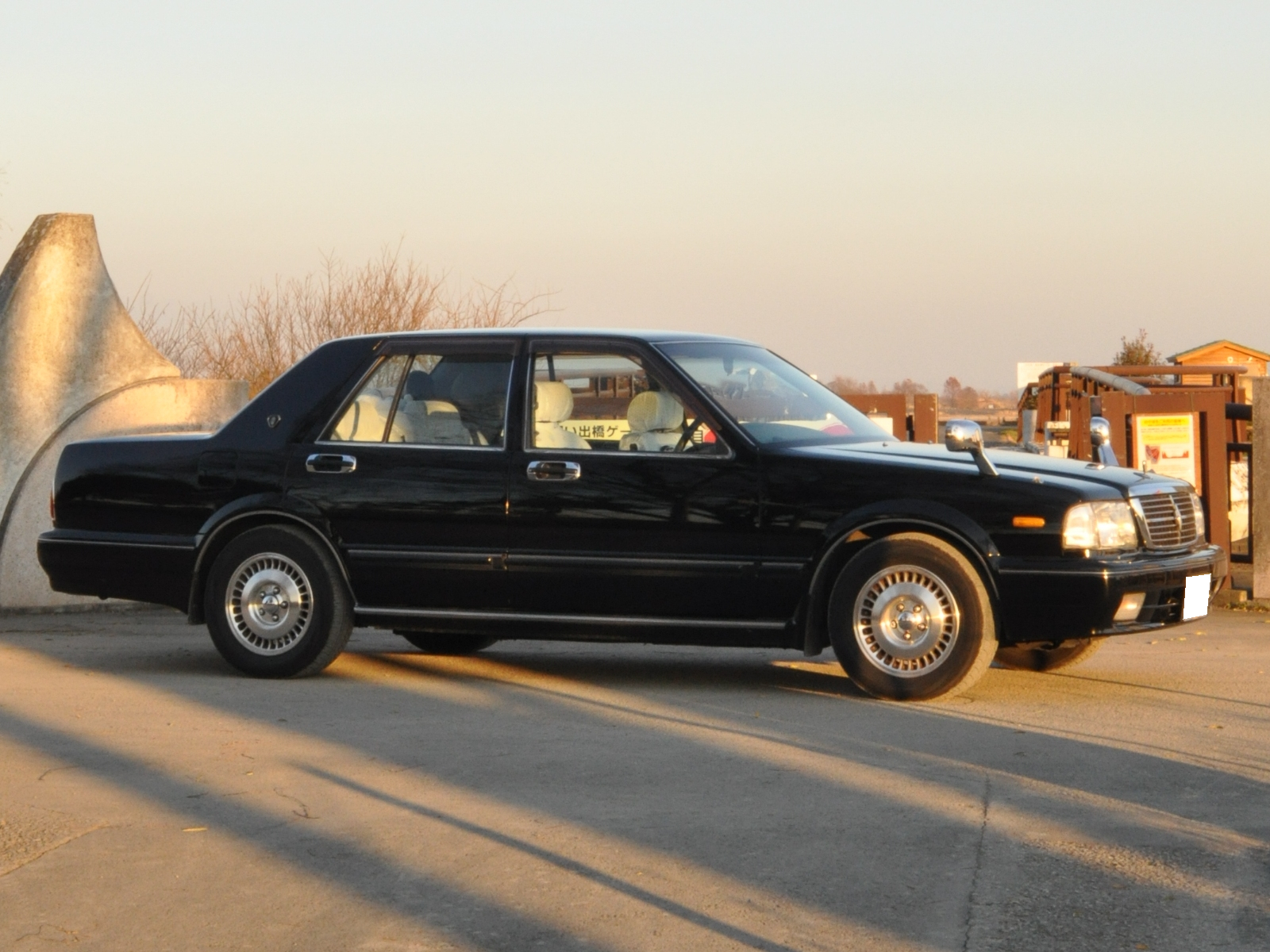
Facelift Nissan Cedric V30E Brougham

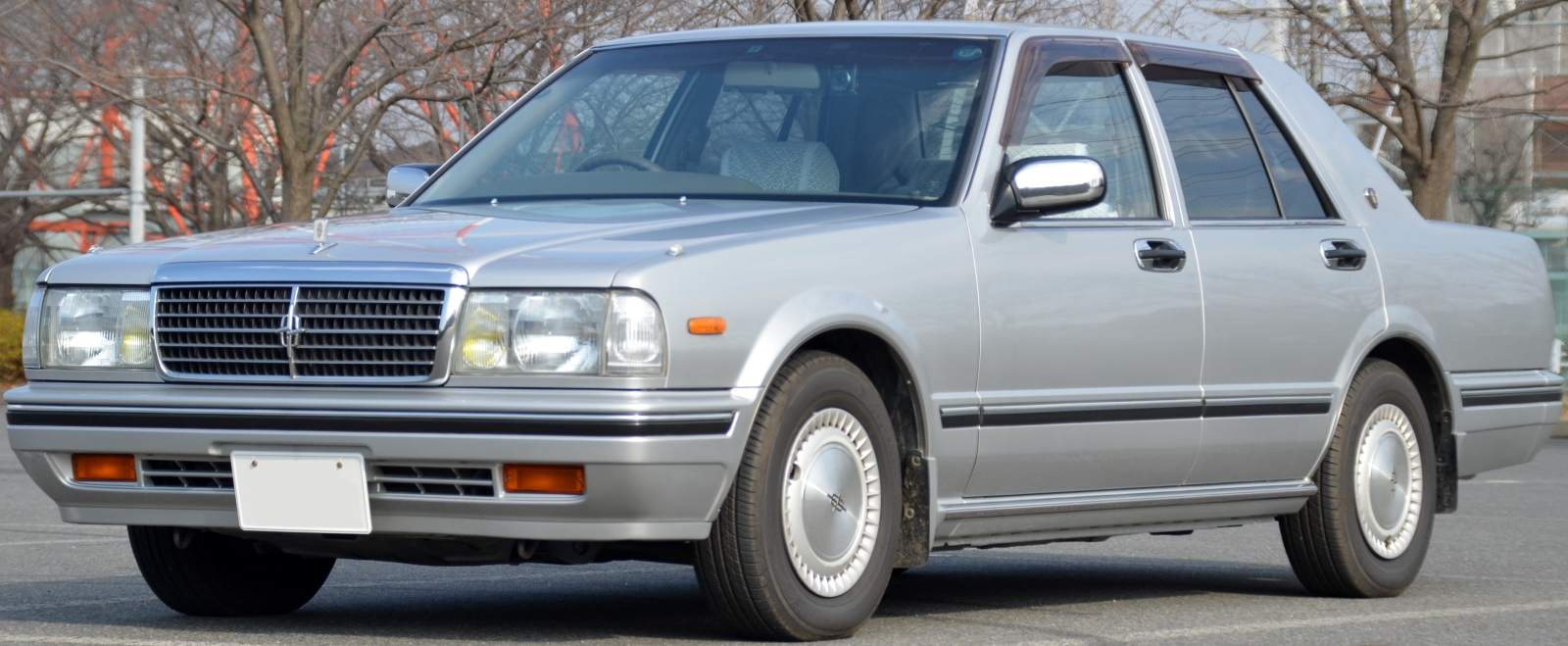
Facelift Nissan Cedric 2000 Brougham

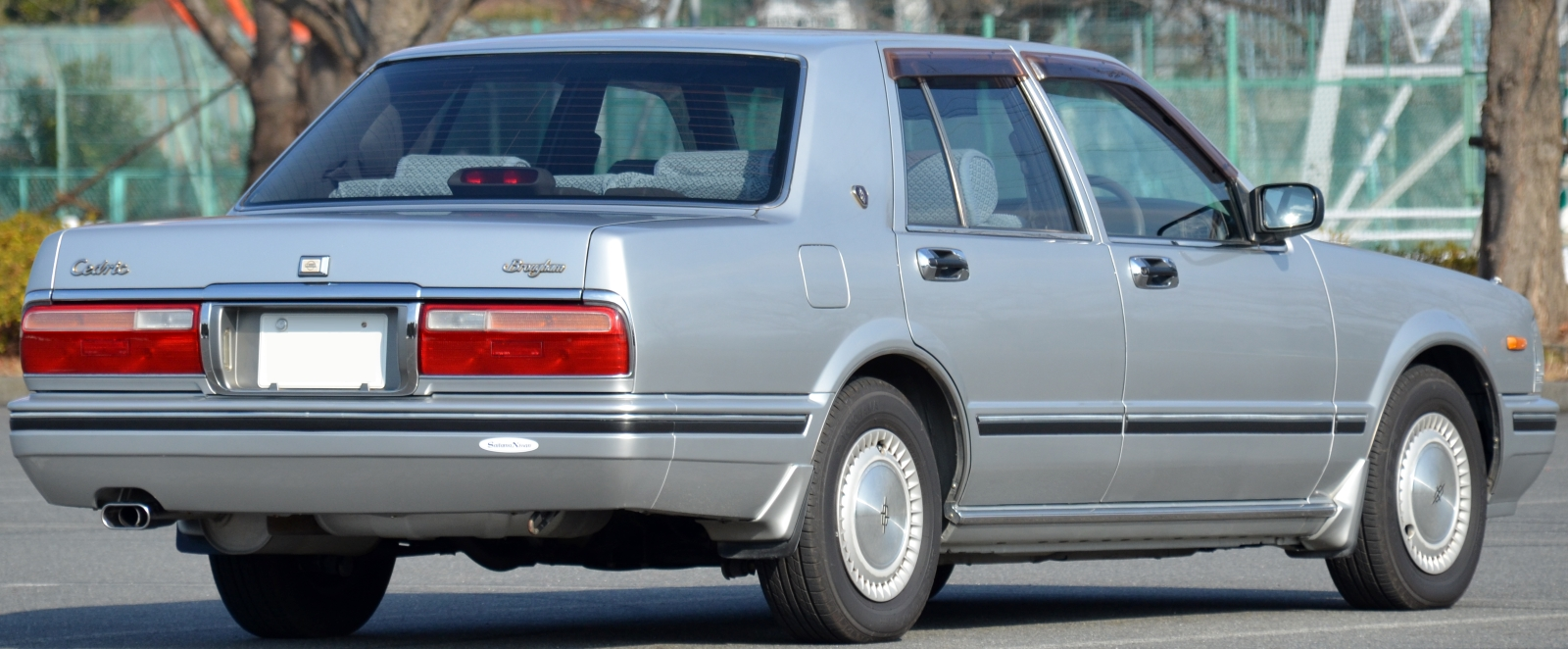
Facelift Nissan Cedric 2000 Brougham rear view

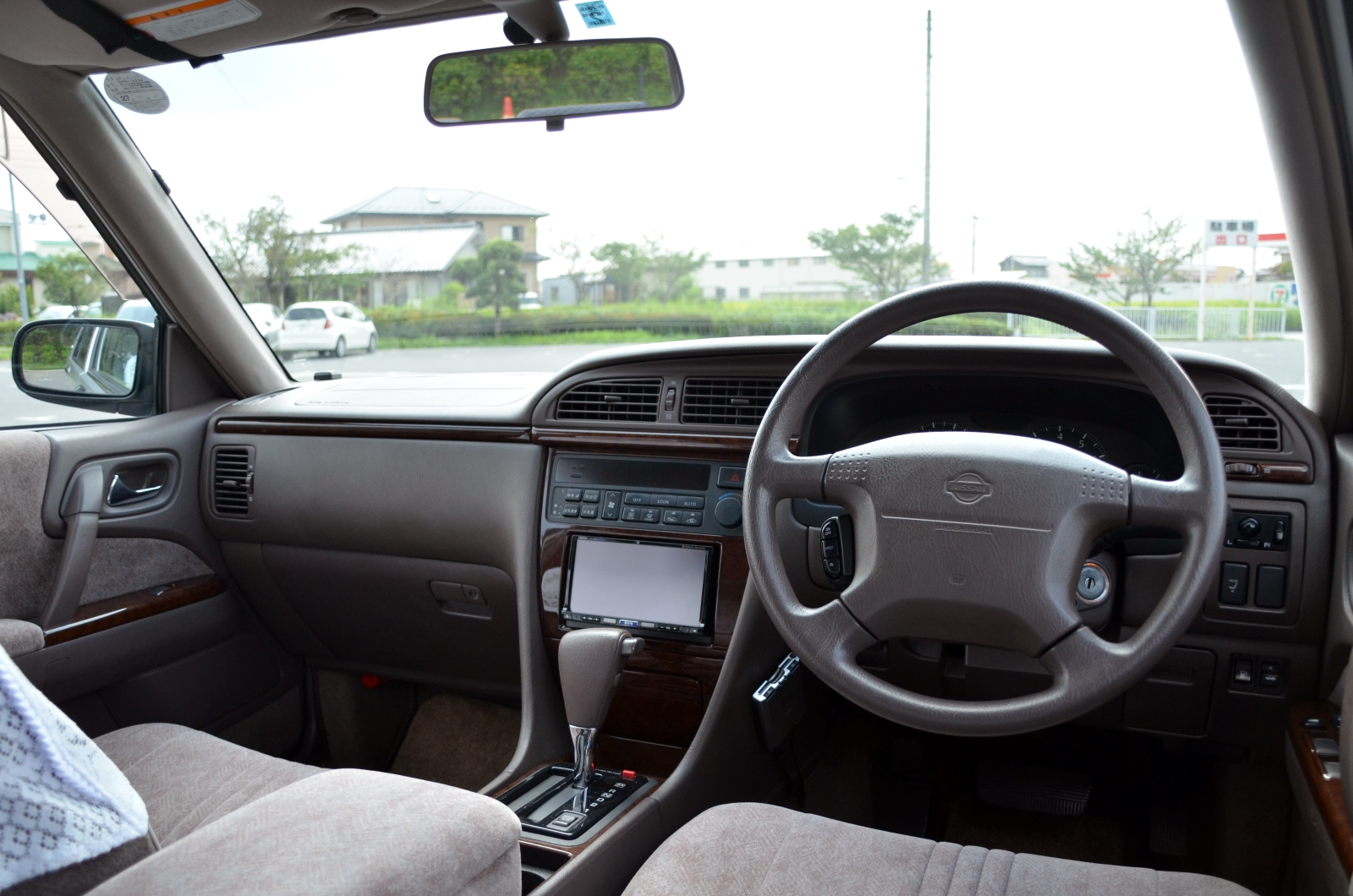
Brougham sedan interior

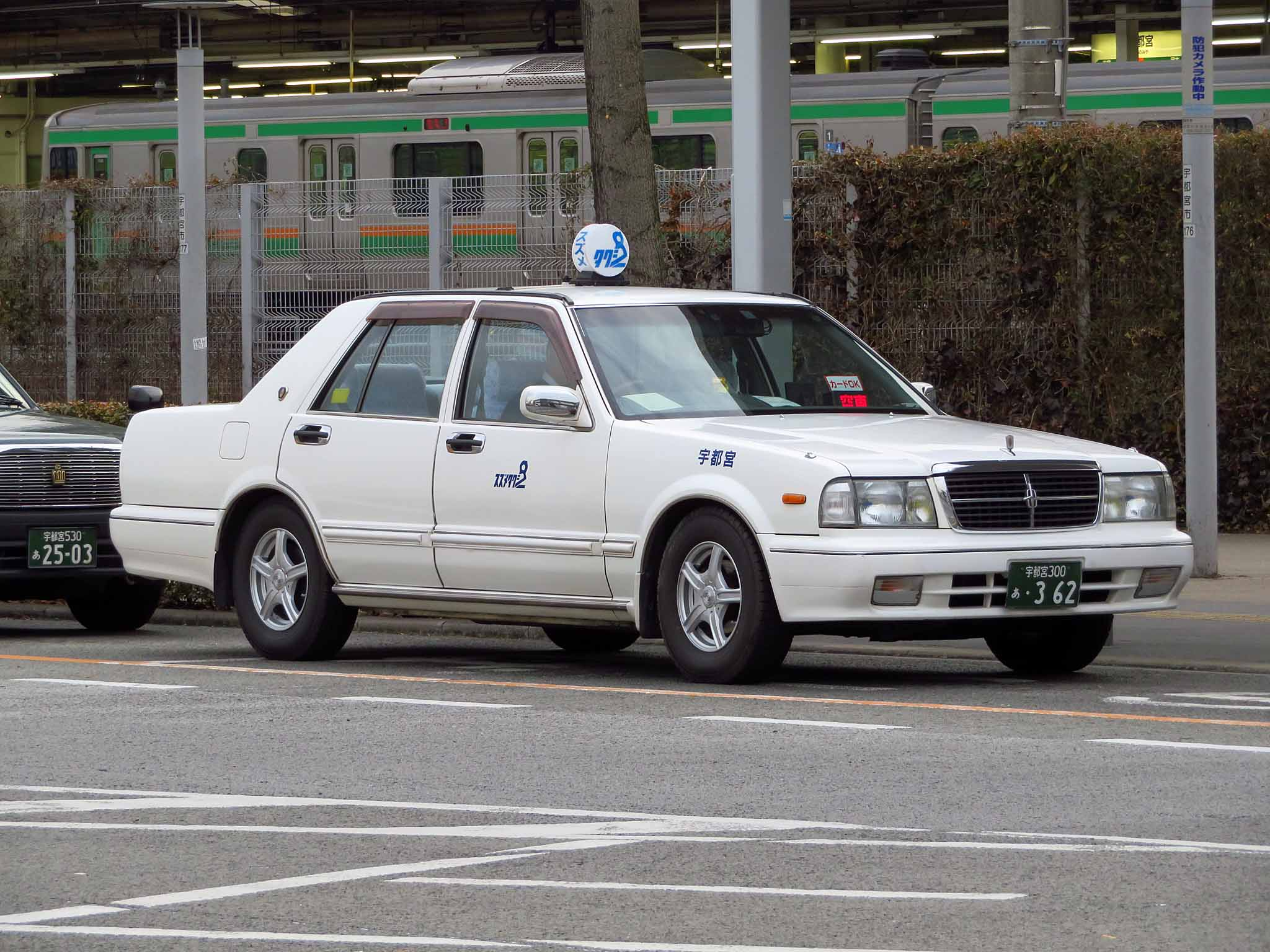
Facelift model Cedric sedan (YPY31)

== Eighth generation (Y32; 1991) ==
Most of the information in this article was translated from the Nissan Cedric article on Japanese Wikipedia at ja:日産・セドリック.

Nissan Cedric Y32
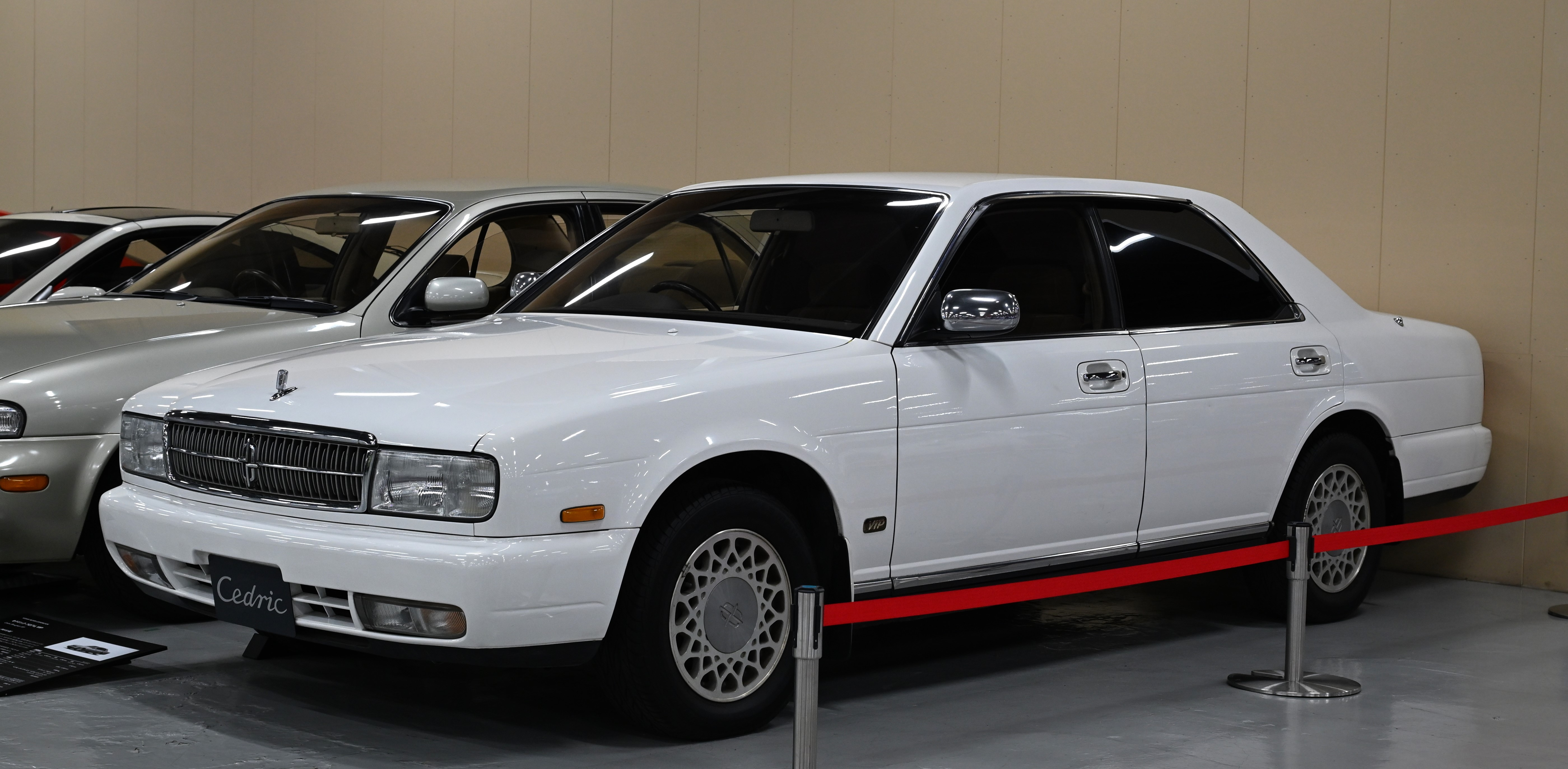
- 1991 Nissan Cedric Brougham VIP (Y32)

Overview
- Also called: Nissan Gloria
- Production: June 1991–June 1995
- Assembly: Japan: Kaminokawa, Tochigi

Body and chassis
- Body style: 4-door hardtop
- Layout: FR layout
- Related: Nissan Crew; Nissan Cima (Y32); Nissan Leopard (Y32)

Powertrain
- Engine: 2.0 L VG20E V6; 3.0 L VG30E V6; 3.0 L VG30DE V6; 3.0 L VG30DET V6 turbo; 2.8 L RD28 I6 diesel
- Transmission: 4/5-speed automatic

Dimensions
- Wheelbase: 2,760 mm (108.7 in)
- Length: 4,780 mm (188.2 in); 4,690 mm (184.6 in) (2.0 L)
- Width: 1,745 mm (68.7 in); 1,690 mm (66.5 in) (2.0 L)
- Height: 1,390 mm (54.7 in)
- Curb weight: 1,660–1,710 kg (3,660–3,770 lb)

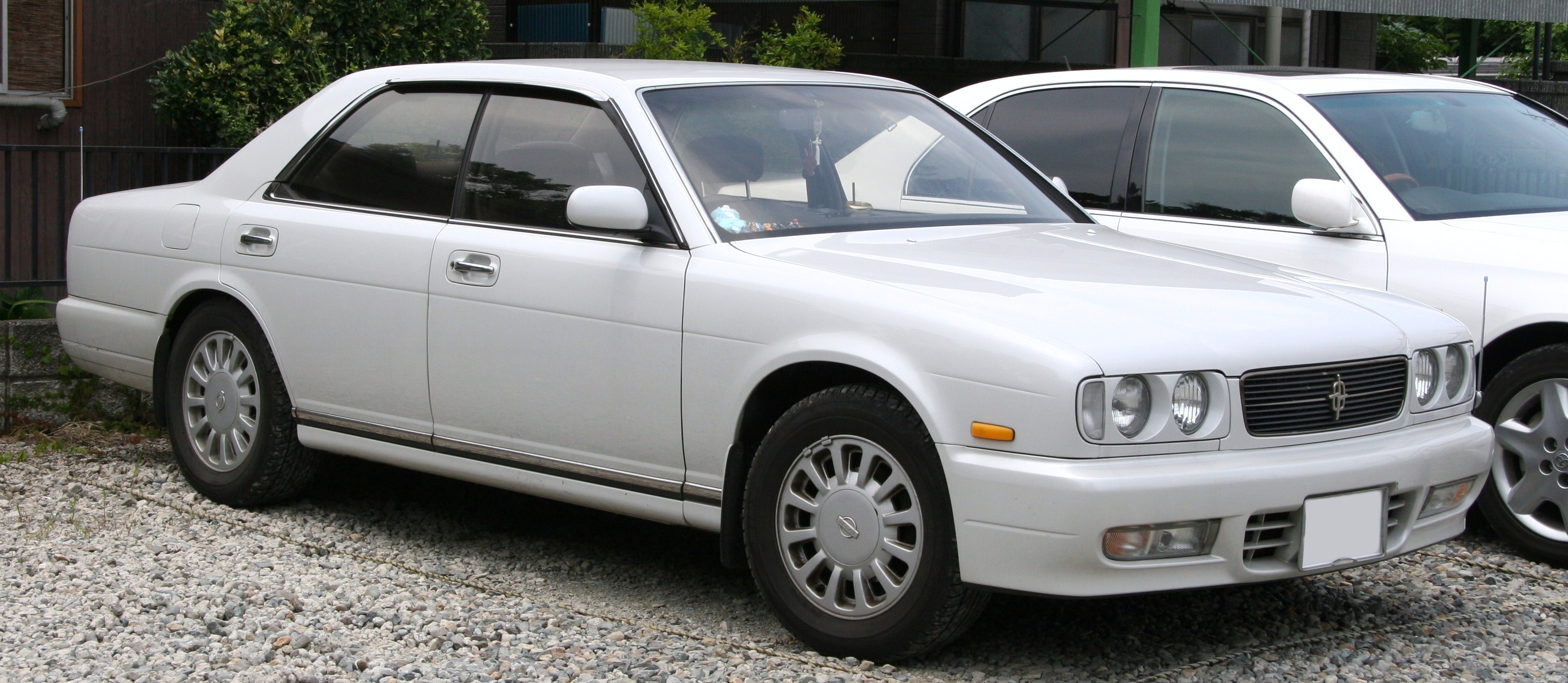
1993 Nissan Cedric Gran Turismo (Y32)

The Y32 Cedric, only ever available in a Hardtop version aimed at private buyers, was a reskin of the Y31 model. The Y31 Sedan continued in production alongside the Y32, intended for commercial and institutional uses. The Cedric had a market reputation appealing to an older demographic, while the sister car Nissan Gloria, which has a more performance oriented reputation, aimed for younger buyers. This model shared much of its mechanicals with the newly released Cedric Cima which was a sales success for Nissan. The introduction of the Cima began to siphon off buyers who normally purchased the Brougham and Brougham VIP, with the Cedric Brougham VIP being the rarest. Worldwide the number of VIP Brougham on Japan's Nissan Motors database is less than 17 to date.

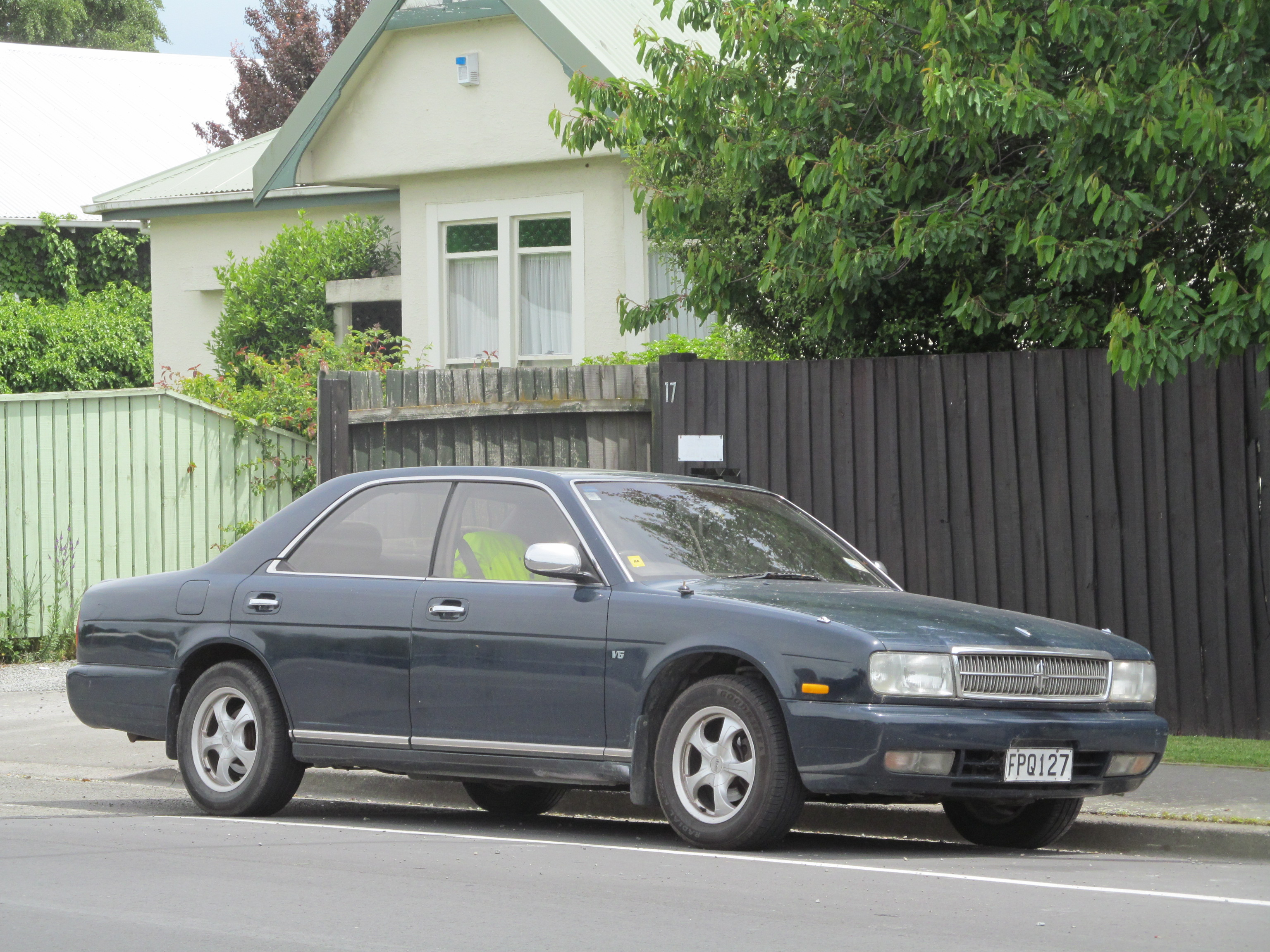
1991 Nissan Cedric Brougham Hardtop (Y32) in New Zealand.

The Y32 was produced from June 1991 through 1994. It has had SOHC and DOHC versions of the VG series V6, alongside the inline six Diesel 2.8 version. A four-cylinder engine was never available as the Y32 was only ever marketed in more upscale versions. The performance oriented Gran Turismo reverted to four round headlights, giving the vehicle a similar appearance to the BMW 7 Series sedan sold at the time. Manual transmissions were no longer available. Power window switches were illuminated for easy location at night. The parking brake was no longer operated by center-mounted hand-operated handle, instead relocated to a pedal next to the brake pedal. Interior lighting operates gradually when any door is opened, a shortwave radio tuner is included with the stereo system, and maintenance reminders are also added.

In September 1994 and January of the following year, Granturismo and Brougham versions of the lesser two-litre six-cylinder version were added. Production ended in May 1995 before in June introduction of the succeeding Y33 Cedric Hardtop. The Y31 Sedan remained in production for commercial use.

Engines:

- 2.0 L VG20E, 125 PS (92 kW) at 6,000 rpm
- 3.0 L VG30E, 160 PS (118 kW) at 5,200 rpm
- 3.0 L VG30DE, 200 PS (147 kW) at 6,000 rpm
- 3.0 L VG30DET, 255 PS (188 kW) at 6,000 rpm
- 2.8 L RD28, 100 PS (74 kW) at 4,800 rpm

== Ninth generation (Y33; 1995) ==
Most of the information in this article was translated from the Nissan Cedric article on Japanese Wikipedia at ja:日産・セドリック.

Nissan Cedric Y33
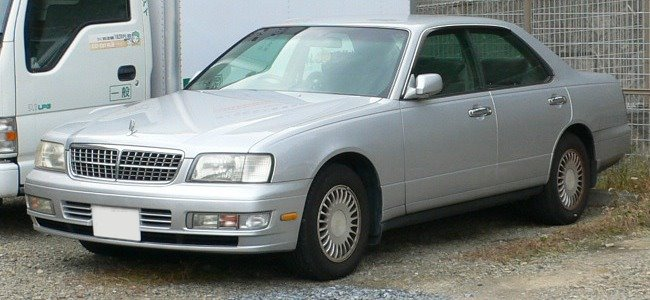
- 1997 Nissan Cedric Brougham (facelift, Japan)

Overview
- Also called: Nissan Gloria
- Production: June 1995 – August 1999
- Assembly: Japan: Kaminokawa, Tochigi

Body and chassis
- Body style: 4-door hardtop
- Layout: FR layout
- Related: Nissan Gloria; Nissan Cima (Y33); Nissan Leopard (Y33)

Powertrain
- Engine: 2.0 L VG20E V6; 2.5 L VQ25DE V6; 2.5 L RB25DET I6; 3.0 L VG30E V6; 3.0 L VQ30DE V6; 3.0 L VQ30DET V6 turbo; 2.8 L RD28 I6 diesel
- Transmission: 4-speed automatic

Dimensions
- Wheelbase: 2,800 mm (110.2 in)
- Length: 4,860 mm (191.3 in); 4,690 mm (184.6 in) (2.0 L)
- Width: 1,765 mm (69.5 in); 1,690 mm (66.5 in) (2.0 L)
- Height: 1,425 mm (56.1 in)
- Curb weight: 1,660–1,715 kg (3,660–3,781 lb)

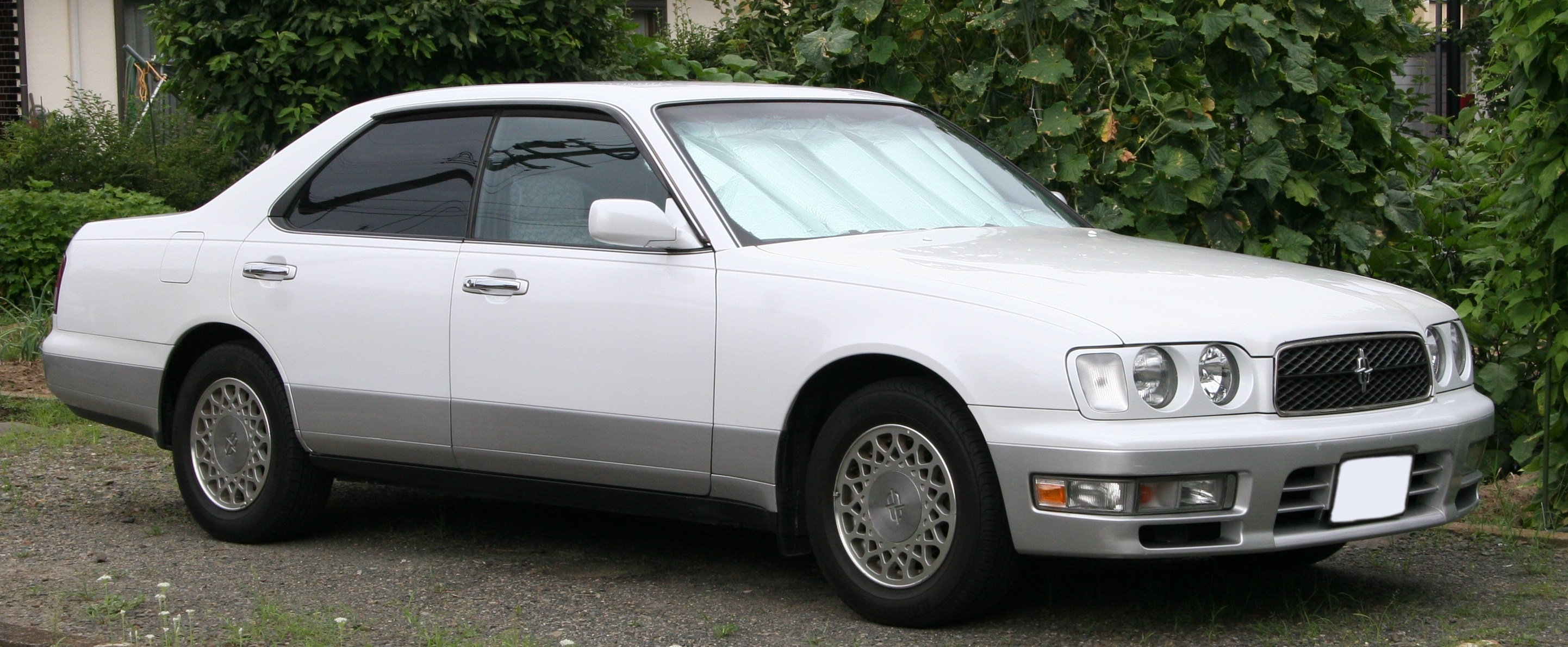

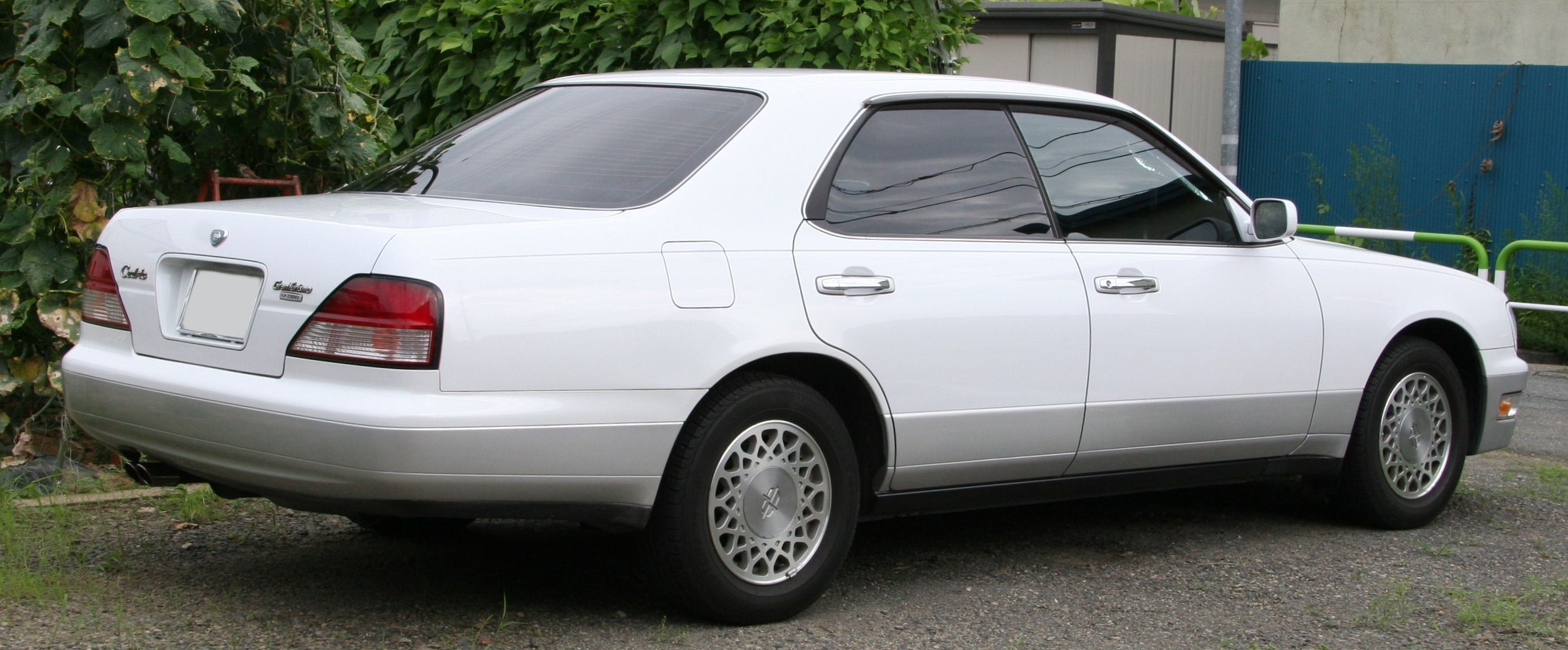
1995 Nissan Cedric GranTurismo Ultima

The Y33 was sold from June 1995 through June 1999. The VG series engine was replaced with the newly developed VQ series (except for the initial lower level versions). AWD ATTESA E-TS, also found on the Skyline, Laurel and Stagea, was added to the options list. One of the major advantages of the VQ series over the VG series was the aluminum alloy block and heads, helping to reduce weight. This generation of the Cedric was also built in LHD for export to Middle East markets. Export versions generally received the VG30E engine, with outputs from 130 to 143 PS (96 to 105 kW) depending on the octane rating.

Engines:

- 2.0 L VG20E
- 2.5 L VQ25DE
- 2.5 L RB25DET
- 3.0 L VG30E
- 3.0 L VQ30DE
- 3.0 L VQ30DET
- 2.8 L RD28 (series 2)

== Tenth generation (Y34; 1999) ==
Most of the information in this article was translated from the Nissan Cedric article on Japanese Wikipedia at ja:日産・セドリック.

Nissan Cedric Y34
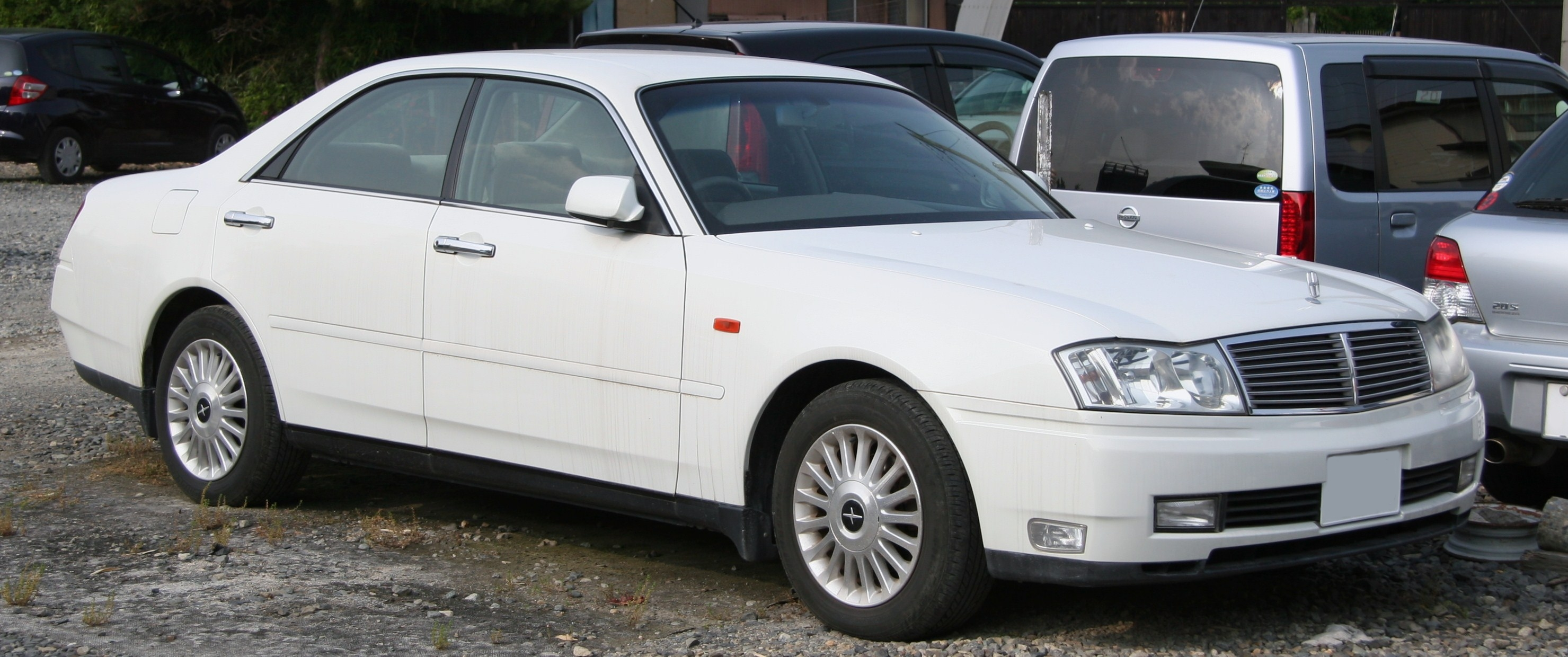
- 1999 Nissan Cedric

Overview
- Also called: Nissan Gloria
- Production: 1999–2004
- Assembly: Japan: Kaminokawa, Tochigi

Body and chassis
- Body style: 4-door hardtop
- Layout: FR layout/AWD

Powertrain
- Engine: 2.5 L VQ25DD V6 LEV; 2.5 L RB25DET I6 turbo; 3.0 L VQ30DD V6 LEV; 3.0 L VQ30DET V6 LEV turbo
- Transmission: 4-speed automatic; CVT

Dimensions
- Wheelbase: 2,800 mm (110.2 in)
- Length: 4,860 mm (191.3 in)
- Width: 1,770 mm (69.7 in)
- Height: 1,450 mm (57.1 in)
- Curb weight: 1,580–1,610 kg (3,480–3,550 lb)

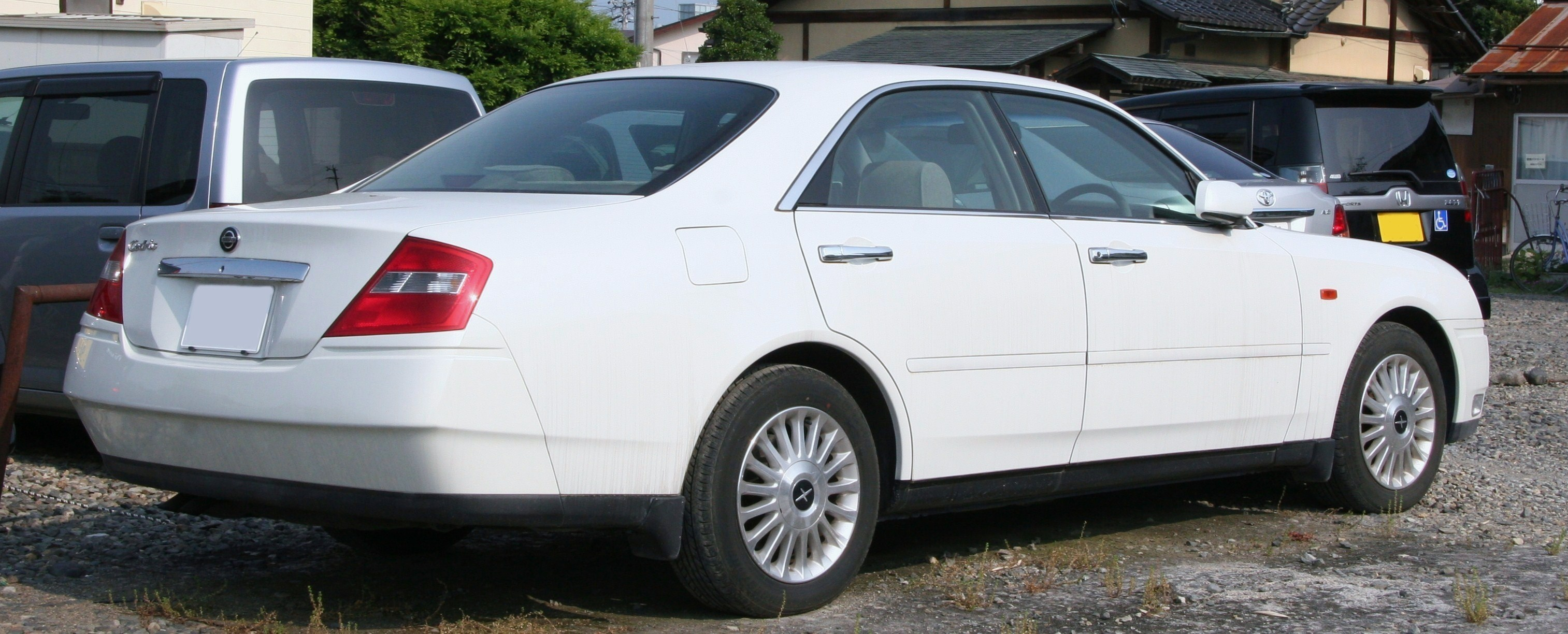
Nissan Cedric

The Y34 Cedric was introduced on 28 June 1999, along with the Y34 Gloria.

The line-up consisted of the 250 L and LV (naturally aspirated 2.5-litre V6), 300LV (naturally aspirated 3-litre V6) and 300LX/300VIP (3-litre turbo V6), all with rear-wheel drive; additionally there was the 250 L/LV Four featuring all-wheel drive and a turbocharged version of Nissan's 2.5-litre inline six also seen in the Skyline. Prices (in 1999) ranged from ¥3,110,000 for a base 250 L to ¥4,940,000 for the ultra-luxurious 300VIP.

In 2000, it won the Automotive Researchers' and Journalists' Conference award in Japan in two categories: "Car of the Year" and "Technology of the Year" (for the Nissan Extroid CVT transmission).

Direct injection was added to all V6 engines for improved performance and reduced emissions, signified by the "DD" designation in the engine model number. AWD is only available on vehicles equipped with the RB25DET engine. A CVT (a rare case for an RWD-based vehicle) was available on the 300 VIP-Z and 300 LX-ZS trim levels. Top level Cedrics are comparable to the parallel line Nissan Cima, which occupies a market slot just beneath the Nissan President. Autech released a special 40th anniversary version of the Cedric, with the VQ30DET engine. Satellite guided navigation is added to this generation.

A one-off Y34 roadster built by Nissan for the Tokyo Yakult Swallows for use as a bullpen car remained in use as of 2017.

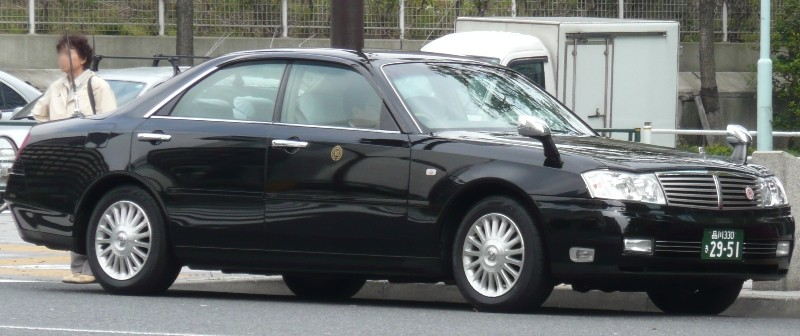
Nissan Cedric (Y34) Daiwa Taxi with fender mirrors.

In October 2004, the last Cedric hardtop was built, after which it was replaced by the Nissan Fuga. The Cedric nameplate did remain available on the Y31-series sedans for commercial users until 2014.

== Nissan Cedric in fiction ==
Older models of the Cedric appeared in many various Asian movies and TV dramas on different roles, most prominently as taxis (especially in Hong Kong) as well as police cars. In Japanese movies and TV shows they were used as civilian vehicles, taxis as well as police cars; notably appearing in the crime dramas Daitokai (大都会 in Japanese) and Seibu Keisatsu (西部警察) (1979–1984). The Cedric was used as a police vehicle, alongside the Laurel and the Gloria, with most of them being wrecked in Seibu Keisatsu, with the exception of the 430 model Cedrics that were used as marked police cars. A 1963 model appears in the film The Big Steal, as the car given to the protagonist by his parents.
