= Nissan Gloria =

Luxury car produced by Nissan (1959-2004)

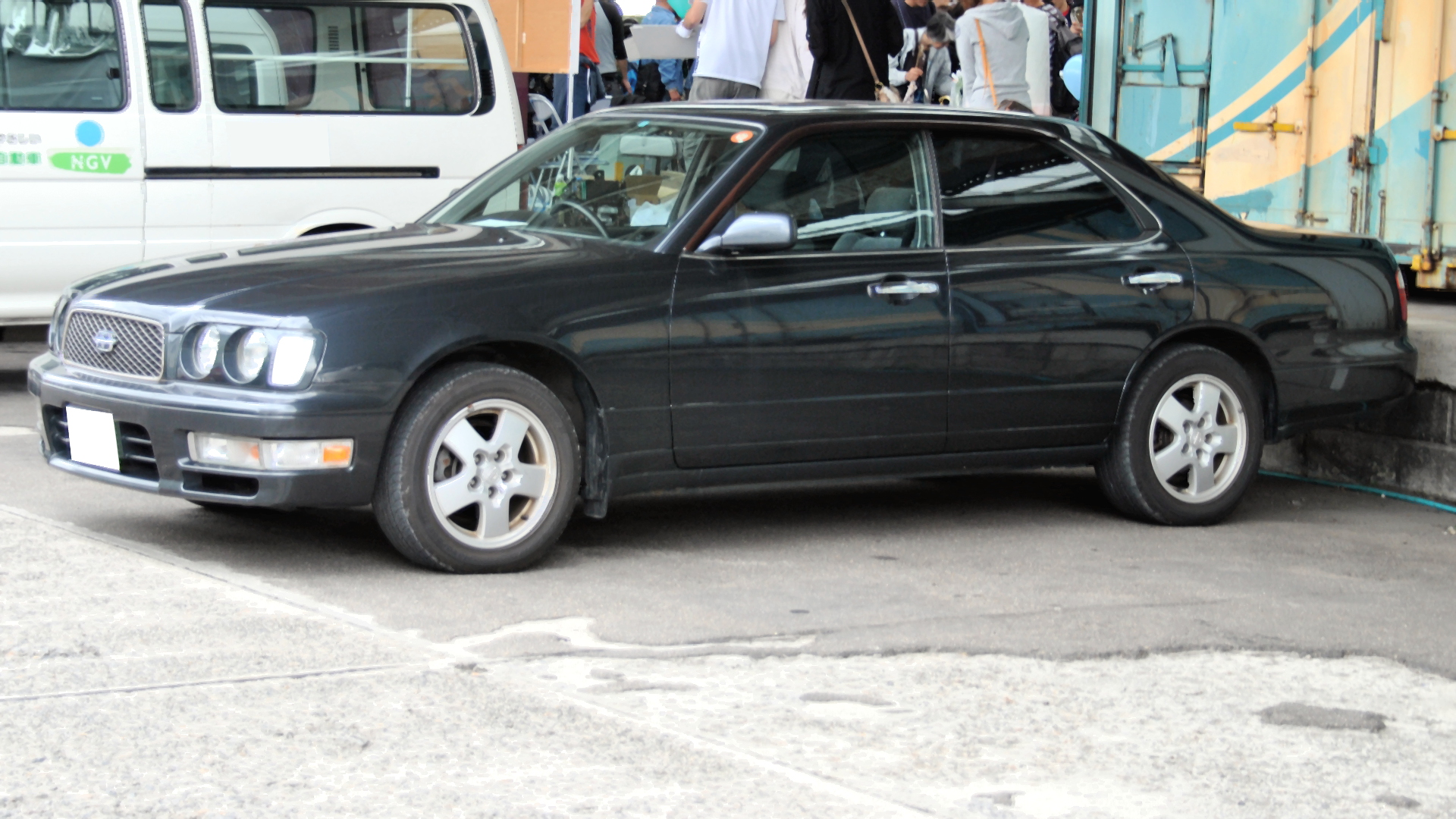
- Nissan Gloria Gran Turismo Ultima (Y33)

Overview
- Manufacturer: Prince/Nissan
- Also called: Prince Gloria (1959–1967); Infiniti M45
- Production: 1959–2004

Body and chassis
- Class: Executive car
- Related: Nissan Cima; Nissan Leopard; Nissan Crew; Nissan Cedric

Chronology
- Successor: Nissan Fuga

The Gloria (Japanese: 日産・グロリア) is a large luxury car made from 1959 by the Prince Motor Company, and later by Nissan Motors since its merger with the former — hence being originally marketed as Prince Gloria and later as Nissan Gloria. Initially based on the smaller Prince Skyline, the Gloria line was merged with Nissan Cedric starting with 1971 models and both continued until 2004, when they were both replaced by Nissan Fuga.

After Nissan assumed Prince's operations, the now Nissan-badged Glorias were sold along with the Nissan Skyline. They were marketed through the Nissan Prince Store network, composed of dealerships that were formerly affiliated with the Prince company. The Prince G engine was used in the Gloria until 1969.

Its name was inspired by the Latin word "Glory".

== First generation (BLSI; 1959) ==
Prince Gloria (BLSI)
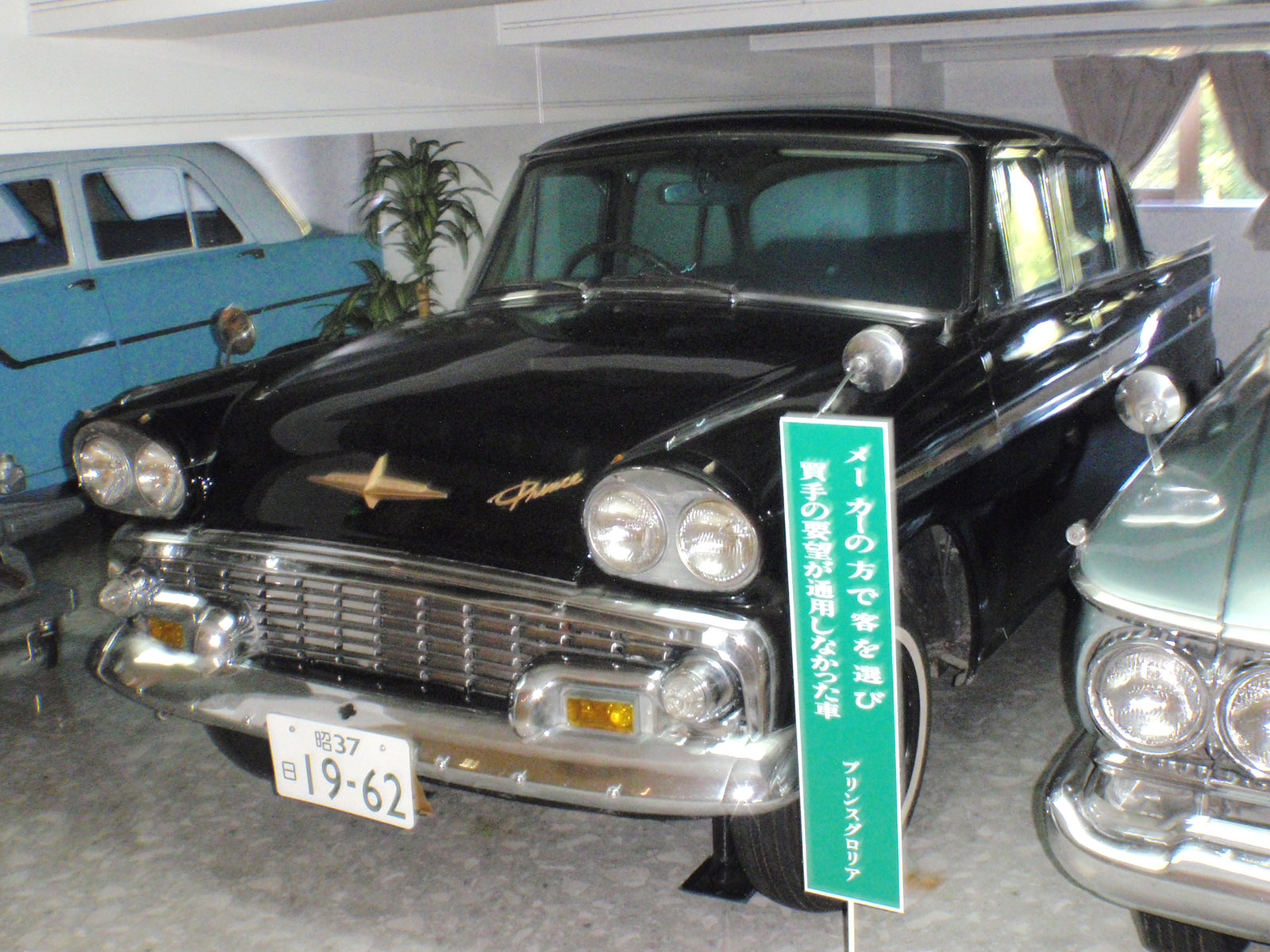

Overview
- Model code: BLSI
- Production: 1959–1963
- Assembly: Japan: Mitaka
- Designer: Takuya Himura

Body and chassis
- Body style: 4-door sedan
- Layout: FR layout
- Related: Prince Skyline

Powertrain
- Engine: 1.9 L GB30 I4 (1959–1960); 1.9 L GB-4 I4 (1961–1963)
- Transmission: 4-speed manual

Dimensions
- Wheelbase: 2,535 mm (99.8 in)
- Length: 4,360 mm (171.7 in)
- Width: 1,675 mm (65.9 in)
- Height: 1,535 mm (60.4 in)
- Curb weight: 1,360 kg (3,000 lb)

The Prince Automobile Manufacturers, previously known as Fuji Precision Industry, released a modification of their Prince Skyline with a more luxurious approach, and modified exterior sheet metal, at the All Japan Automobile Show, after the Tokyo Motor Show and the Skyline 1900 exhibition, in October 1958. In February 1959 the BLSIP Gloria was released with the 80 PS (59 kW) 1.9-liter GB-30 OHV four-cylinder engine. The Gloria mimicked popular appearances found in North America, the Gloria used a styling feature on the front bumper, called "Dagmar bumpers". The grille featured "PRINCE" in individual gold letters. The side trim was similar to the Skyline, except the chrome-framed painted strip ends at the rear door instead of the back of the car. The other side of the painted section is painted the same colour as the car and inside this section is a "Prince Gloria" badge. Inside the Gloria used the same dashboard as the Skyline, but a clock and radio were standard. The radio featured two speakers, a new idea for the time. The seats were similar but were trimmed in a plush cloth fabric. The rear seat featured a fold down armrest.

In April 1959, Crown Prince Akihito was presented with the first Gloria as a wedding gift. According to the article found in Japanese Wikipedia, the Gloria got its name as a tribute when the first series BLSI sedan was presented to the then Crown Prince Akihito, the future Emperor of Japan, and Princess Michiko as an anniversary gift after one year of marriage. The Prince Automotive Industry was the official vehicle supplier to the Imperial Household Agency at that time, previously known as Fuji Precision Technology. Previously, the Crown Prince was also presented with the first Prince Sedan earlier.

In February 1960 the BLSIP-2 was released. The front end was modified with quad headlights and although the grille opening remained the same, the grille itself was changed, with six thick horizontal bars replacing the 13 thin horizontal bars. The rear end was completely redesigned; the tail lights were moved low to just above the rear bumper. The rear end and tail fins showed resemblance to the 1957 Chevrolet. The tail fins were capped off with stainless steel trim that ran from one fin, down under the trunk lid opening and back up the fin on the other side. The trunk lid featured a "Prince" badge and a "Gloria" badge to the right of it. The panel between the tail lights was covered in metal trim. Side trim remained identical from the BLSIP-1. The BLSIP-2 continued to use the GB-30 engine.

In February 1961 the BLSIP-3 was released. It featured the new, 94 PS (69 kW) 1.9 L GB-4 inline-four engine. The front end was changed slightly, with the "PRINCE" grille letters removed and instead a Prince badge on the left front side of the hood. The side trim and rear trim panels remained identical to the BLSIP-2.

The suspension used double wishbone and coil springs in the front, and De Dion setup in the back.

== Second generation (S40; 1962) ==
Prince Gloria (S40)
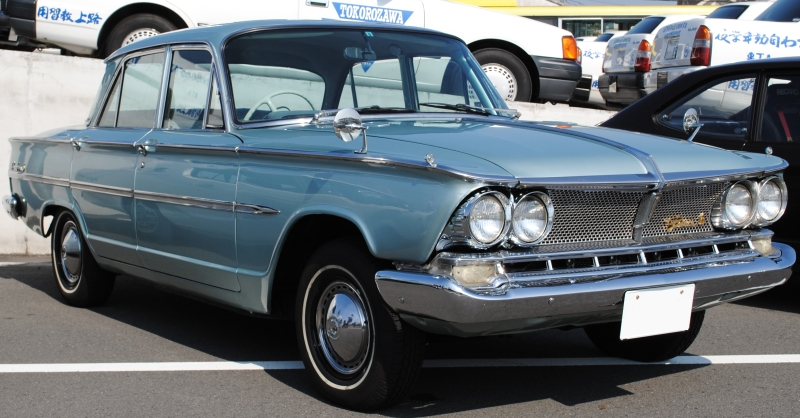

Overview
- Model code: S40/S41/S44
- Also called: Prince B200/B250; PMC B200/B250; Mikado
- Production: 1962–1967
- Assembly: Japan: Musashimurayama; New Zealand: Christchurch (Steel Brothers Addington)
- Designer: Takuya Himura

Body and chassis
- Body style: 4-door sedan; 5-door wagon (W40)
- Layout: FR layout
- Related: Prince Skyline

Powertrain
- Engine: 1.9 L G-2 I4 (S40/V40, through 1966); 2.0 L G-7 I6 (S41/V41/W41); 2.5 L G-11 I6 (S44)
- Transmission: 4-speed manual

Dimensions
- Wheelbase: 2,680 mm (105.5 in)
- Length: 4,650 mm (183.1 in)
- Width: 1,695 mm (66.7 in)
- Height: 1,480 mm (58.3 in)
- Curb weight: 1,295 kg (2,855 lb)

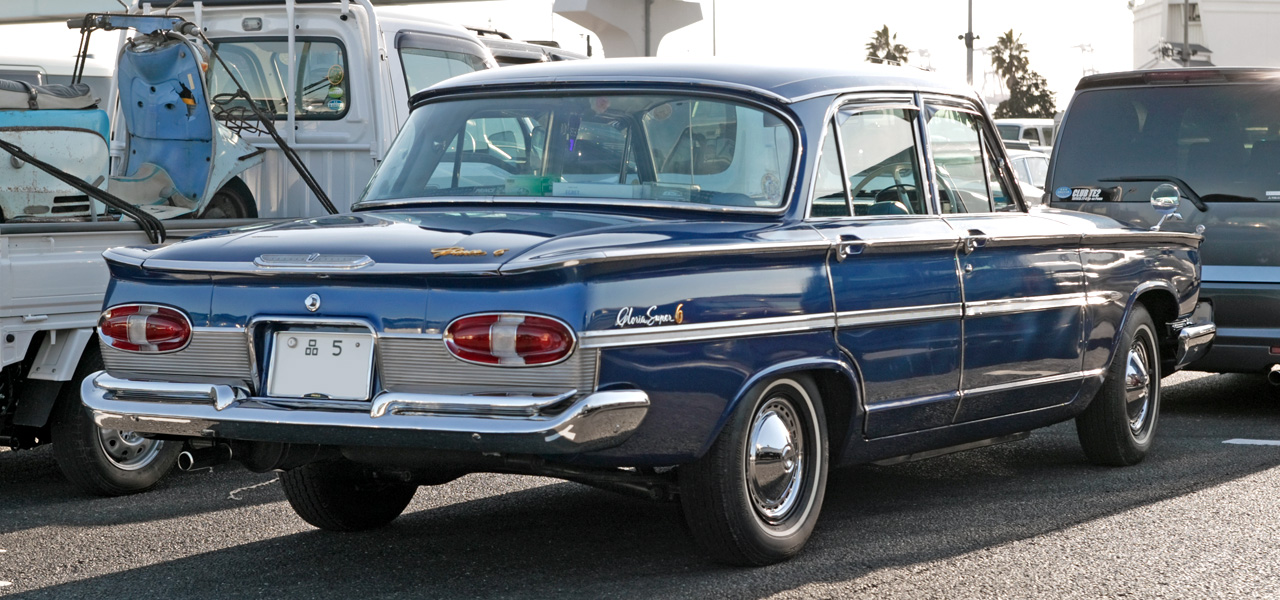
1966 Prince Gloria Super 6 sedan

Later in 1962, Prince introduced the second generation, "S40" Gloria. It was the first six-cylinder Prince, while also offering an updated straight-four, the 94 hp (70 kW) 1.9 L G-2. In June 1963, the first mass-produced Japanese SOHC six-cylinder engine was introduced, known as the G-7, and was installed in the new Gloria Super 6, model S41. The same engine was used in the Gloria 6 Estate and in a commercial delivery van called "Gloria 6 Wagon". This new engine produces 106 PS SAE (78 kW) at 5,400 rpm, with a new SOHC head. The Gloria has an independent suspension in front and a de Dion tube in the back.

A prototype of the second generation Gloria had many design similarities to the Chevrolet Corvair, and Hino Contessa, but the production version was completely redesigned. The production Gloria shows some visual similarities to the 1959 Buick LeSabre, Invicta, and Electra, as evidenced in the strong character/beltline that encompasses the car, the wrap-around windshield and rear window, and the rear roof extension over the rear window. This Gloria also made it into export markets, for instance going on sale in Finland in April 1965.

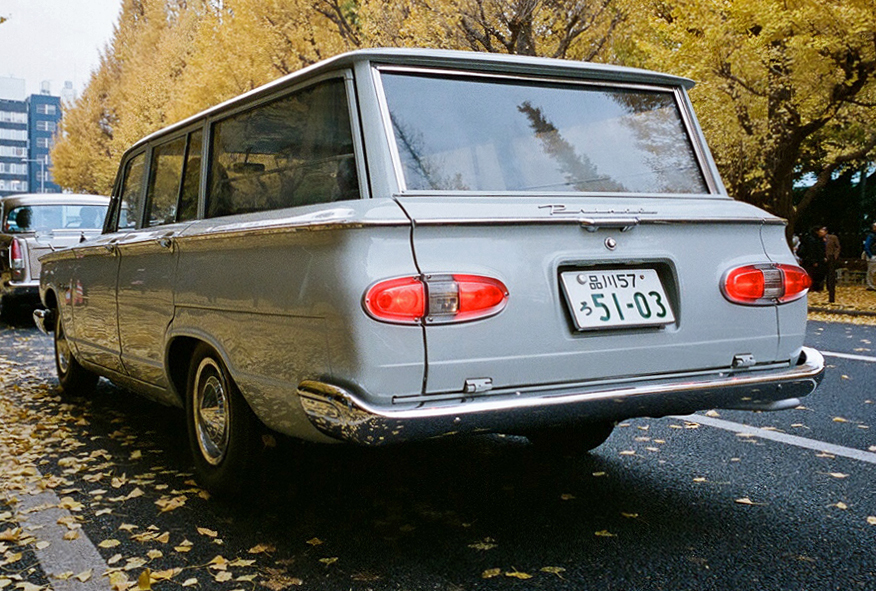
Prince Gloria V41 Van

In October 1962, at the 9th All-Japan Auto show, the 2.5-liter G-11 engine was presented – although it was not immediately installed in any car. In May 1964, the Grand Gloria S44P was released, its introduction preceding the 1964 Summer Olympics held later in October. This vehicle included electric power windows and the new 2.5 L engine, producing 130 PS (96 kW). This was the first Gloria that was no longer regarded as a compact sedan under Japanese vehicle classification regulations due to the engine displacement exceeding two litres.

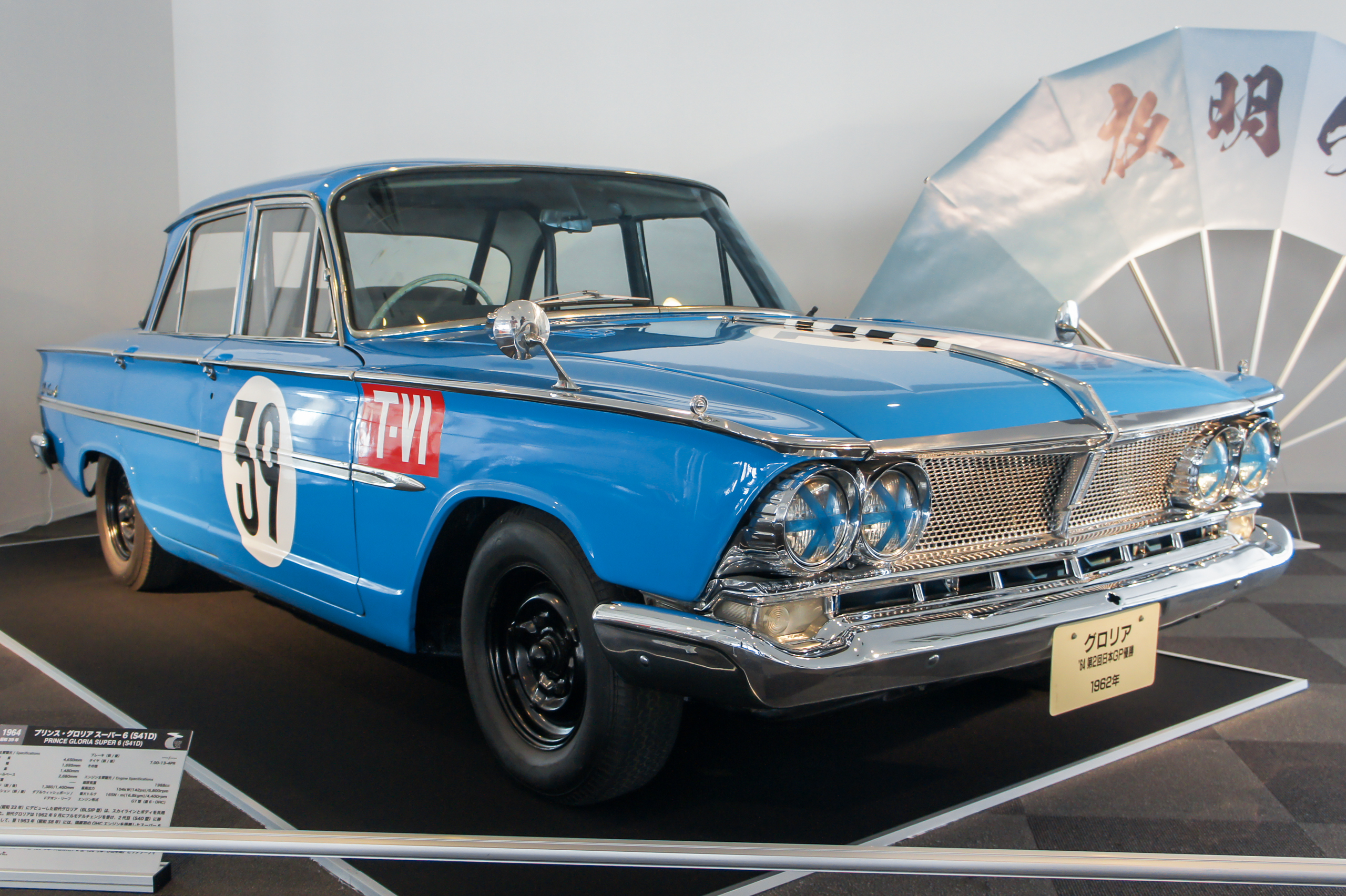
Prince Gloria Super 6, 1964 2nd Japanese Grand Prix T-VI class winner

The second Japan Grand Prix saw the G7B-R Gloria Super 6 engine win the T-VI class race, albeit installed in a lighter Skyline.

In 1966 the S41-2 series was introduced. The exterior remained the same from the S40-1 models, except the grille which had bigger rectangular slots. At the same time Prince merged with Nissan and because of this the badges were changed. In non-Asian markets the cars were sold as the Prince B200. Many cars featured a small "Nissan" badge on the back. The data tag in the engine compartment mentioned both Prince and Nissan. In some European markets the Gloria was sold as the PMC-Mikado Gloria 6. The Super Gloria was sold in export markets as the Prince B250. The S41-2 series continued to use the low compression version of the G-7 engine and the S44-2 continued to use the G-11 engine. The four cylinder engine was dropped.

The Gloria was the first Prince to be assembled outside Japan when New Zealand importer Croyden Motors contracted Steel Brothers Addington to assemble an initial 300 units from CKD kits at a new 1,000-unit factory specially built for the job.

== Third generation (A30; 1967) ==
Nissan Gloria (A30)
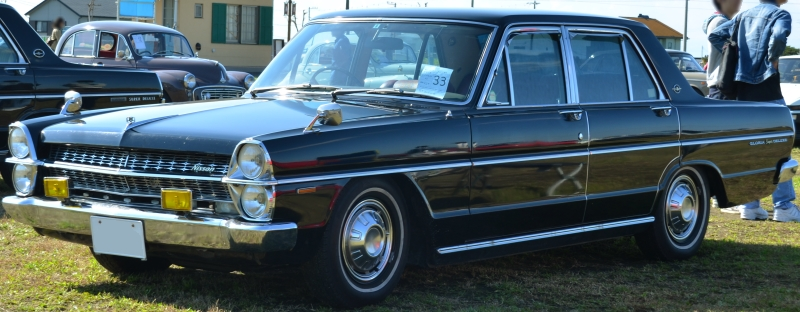

Overview
- Model code: A30
- Production: 1967–1971
- Assembly: Japan: Musashimurayama

Body and chassis
- Body style: 4-door sedan/wagon
- Layout: FR layout
- Related: Nissan Prince Royal

Powertrain
- Engine: 2.0 L H20 I4; 2.0 L G-7 I6; 2.0 L L20 I6
- Transmission: 4-speed manual 3-speed automatic

Dimensions
- Wheelbase: 2,680 mm (105.5 in)
- Length: 4,690 mm (184.6 in)
- Width: 1,695 mm (66.7 in)
- Height: 1,445 mm (56.9 in)
- Curb weight: 1,295 kg (2,855 lb)

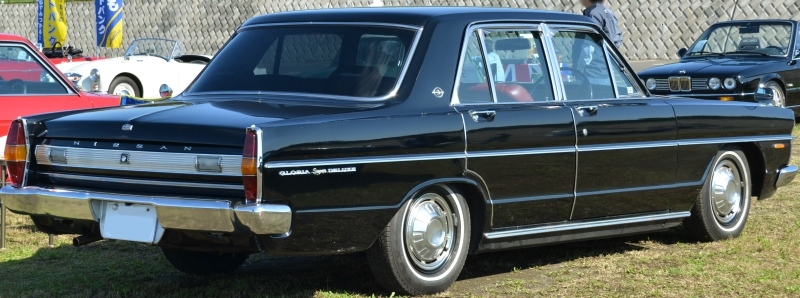
1967 Nissan Gloria Super Deluxe rear view

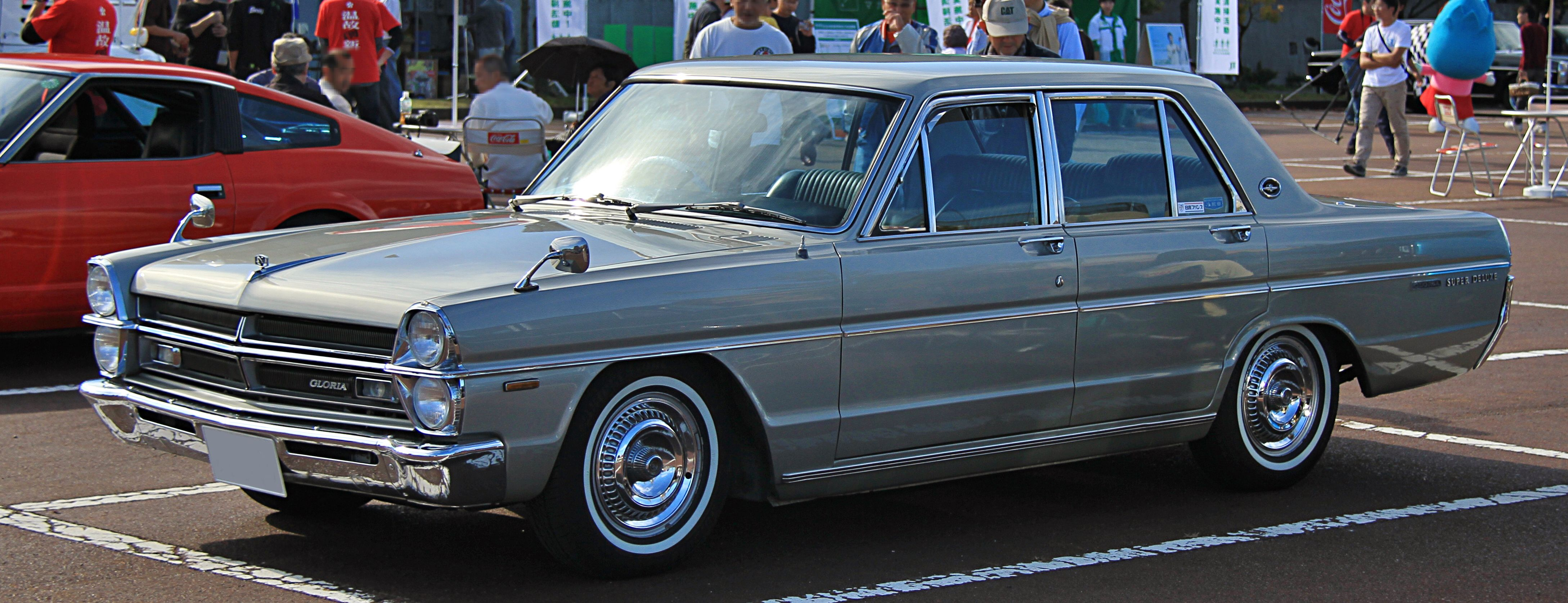
1970 Nissan Gloria Super Deluxe

April 1967 saw a restyle of the bodywork, and all Prince vehicles were now known as Nissan (but the A30 Gloria was officially registered as "Prince" to the Government). The former Prince company, now integrated into Nissan operations, was given the task of designing the Nissan Prince Royal, to be used by the Imperial Household, and thus presented a special version of the Gloria which had a similar appearance to the previous Prince Royal. The styling of this generation (namely, the stacked headlights) appears to have been inspired by contemporary Cadillacs and Pontiacs, while the side mimicked Ford Galaxies of the day. The car also adopted some styling cues from the Nissan Prince Royal, built exclusively for the Emperor of Japan. Vehicles designated as the Super Deluxe, the Super 6 and Van Deluxe had the 6-cylinder engine, whereas the Standard and Van Standard used the 4-cylinder engine. Later the Super Deluxe GL became the top trim level. Due to the Gloria and Cedric being combined to save on production costs, the De Dion axle previously used by the Prince Gloria was downgraded to a solid rear axle with leaf springs.

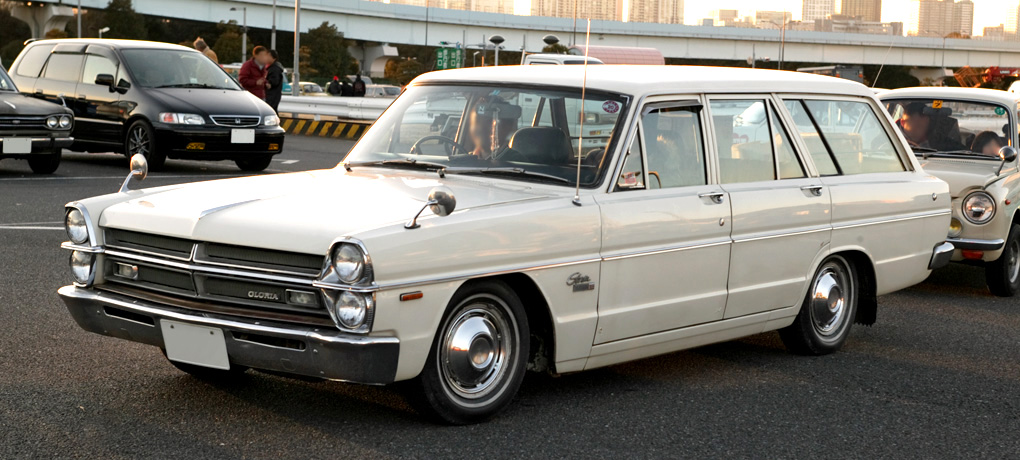
Nissan Gloria Van Deluxe 6 (Commercial model)

The original model was the PA30 sedan and VPA30 wagon, originally fitted with Prince's own G7 six-cylinder engine. The four-cylinder version, with Nissan's H20 engine, was called A30 or VA30. In November 1969 Prince's six-cylinder motor was swapped for Nissan's L20 unit; from now on the chassis code is HA30. Disc brakes for the front wheels were added to the options list.

With the introduction of the fourth generation in 1971, the Gloria model was merged with its former competitor, the Nissan Cedric, to become the Nissan Gloria. This name was also used in some export markets instead of the Cedric or 260C moniker. The Prince dealership network that sold the Gloria was renamed Nissan Prince Store, and the Gloria took the top level vehicle offered at Nissan Prince, while the Nissan Skyline became the junior model.

This generation of Prince was also assembled in New Zealand by Steel Brothers in Christchurch but was now badged as a Nissan Gloria though it was still imported by Croyden Motors, a separate company to Datsun importer Nissan-Datsun NZ Ltd. A total of 900 Prince and Nissan Glorias were built in NZ, which corresponded to the annual low-volume import licence allocation of 300 CKD units a year under government policy of the time. Following the merger of Prince and Nissan in Japan, the Gloria in NZ effectively was replaced by Nissan-Datsun imports of Japanese-assembled Datsun 2300 Personal Six sedans and, later, imported 240C and locally assembled 260C sedans.

== Fourth generation (230; 1971) ==
Most of the information in this article was translated from the Nissan Gloria article on Japanese Wikipedia at ja:日産・グロリア.

Nissan Gloria (230)
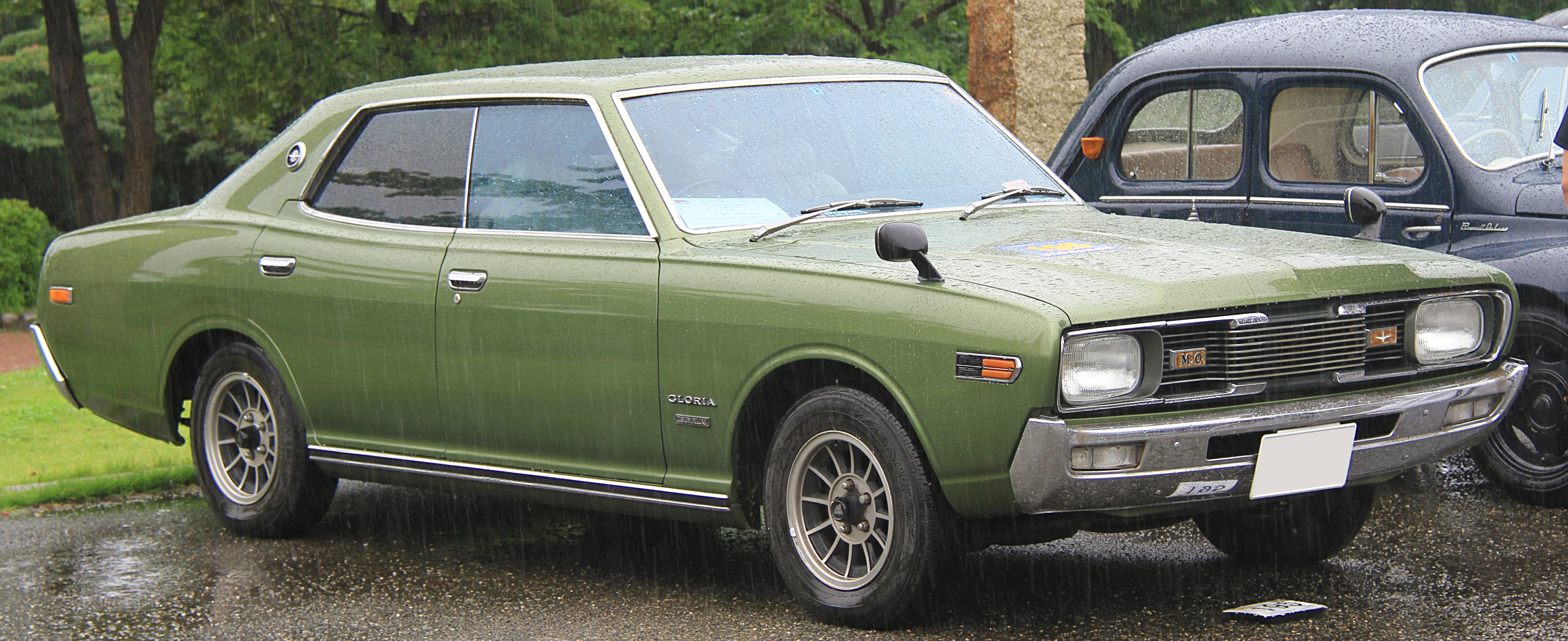
- 1973 Nissan Gloria 230 4-door hardtop

Overview
- Model code: 230
- Also called: Nissan Cedric; Yue Loong Victory 802 (TW)
- Production: 1971–1975
- Assembly: Japan: Musashimurayama; Taiwan: Miaoli

Body and chassis
- Body style: 2-door hardtop coupe 4-door hardtop/sedan/wagon
- Layout: FR layout

Powertrain
- Engine: 2.0 L H20 OHV I4; 2.0 L L20 I6; 2.6 L L26 I6; 2.0 L SD20 diesel OHV I4
- Transmission: 4/5-speed manual 3-speed automatic

Dimensions
- Wheelbase: 2,680 mm (105.5 in)
- Length: 4,690 mm (184.6 in)
- Width: 1,690 mm (66.5 in))
- Height: 1,455 mm (57.3 in)
- Curb weight: 1,345 kg (2,965 lb)

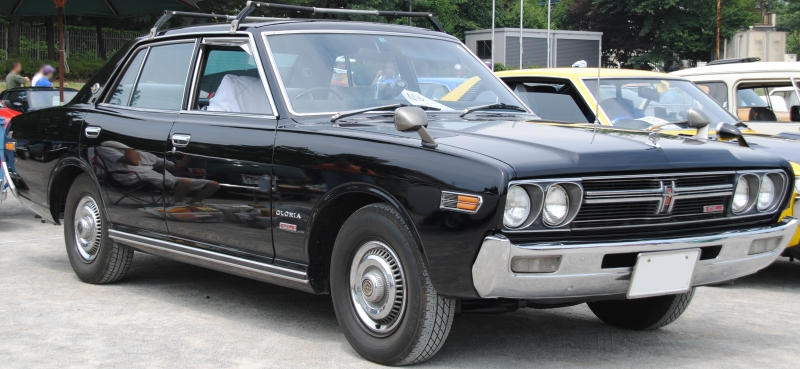
1971 Nissan Gloria GL sedan

Starting with this generation in February 1971, the Cedric and Gloria were essentially the same vehicle, with the Gloria being more upscale than the Cedric. The hood ornament is a stylized version of the Japanese Paper Crane (Orizuru). The primary differences are the hood, radiator grille, taillights and wheel covers. This generation saw Nissan use the "coke bottle styling" appearance, shared with other 1970s Nissan products. The front of the vehicle shares some visual appearances with the 1967–1968 Mercury Marquis. The four-cylinder engine is the H20-series OHV engine, with the 6-cylinder L20 engine using twin carburetors sourced from manufacturer SU carburetor. The H20P uses LPG for fuel, and the SD20 OHV is a diesel engine. The SD20 was the first time a diesel engine was offered in a Gloria.

October 1971 saw the 2.6-litre L26 six-cylinder engine added to the options list. In August 1972, both a two-door hardtop coupé "personal luxury car" and a four-door hardtop was added, to compete with the Toyota Crown coupé.

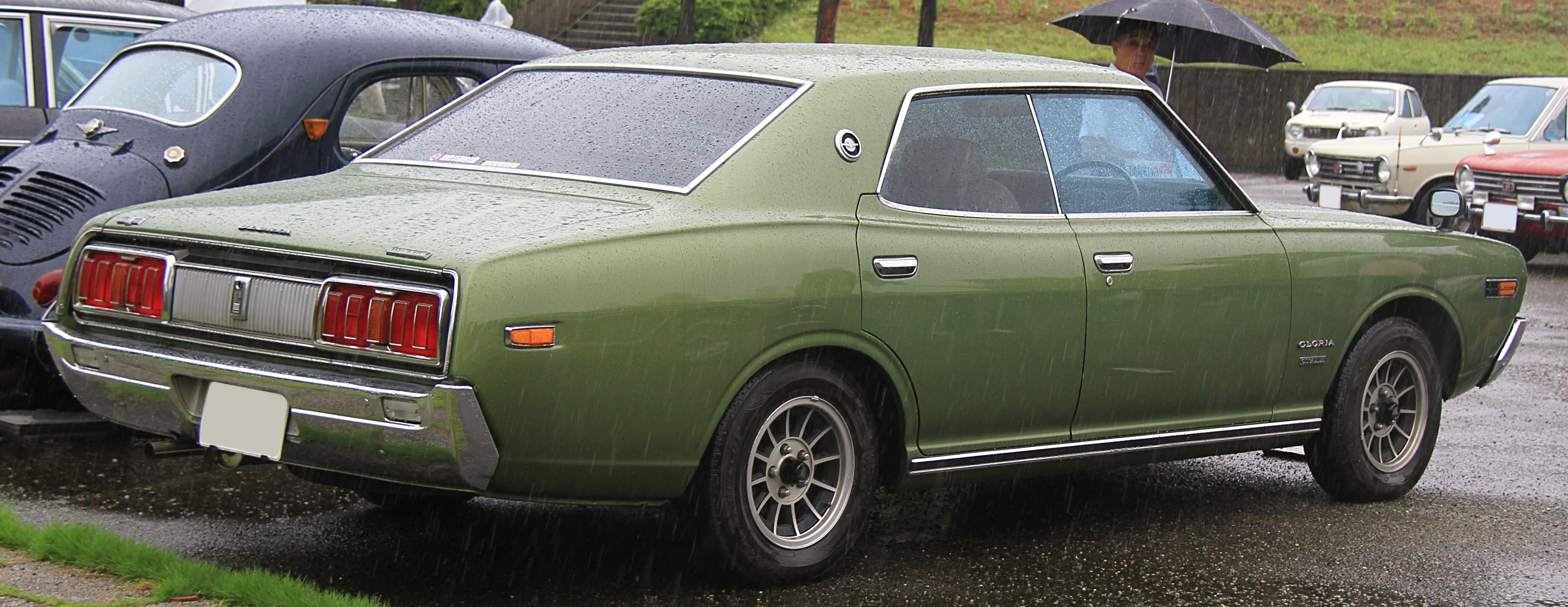
1973 Nissan Gloria Custom Deluxe 4-door hardtop (rear)

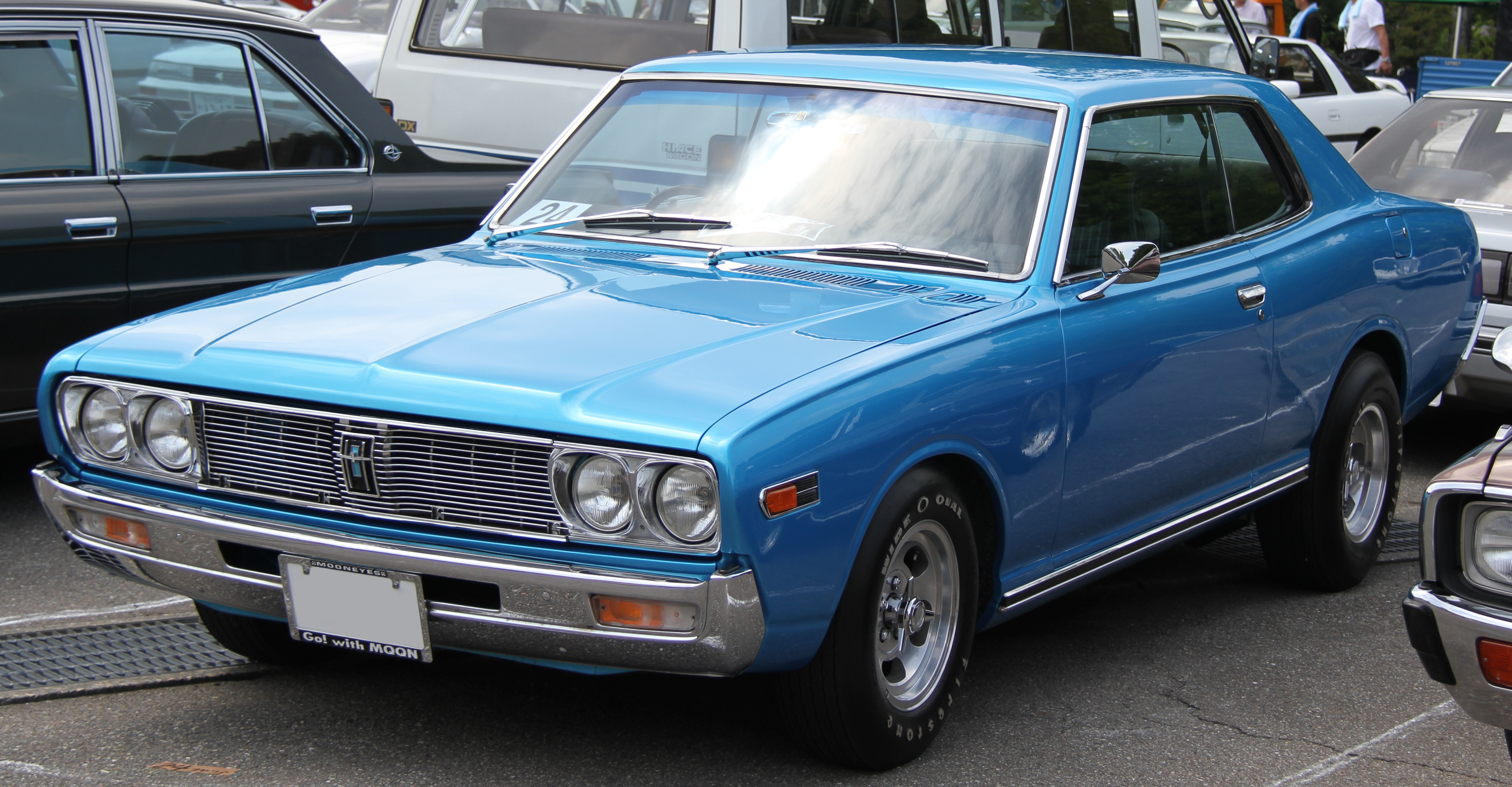
Nissan Gloria series 230 2-door coupe (with aftermarket wheels)

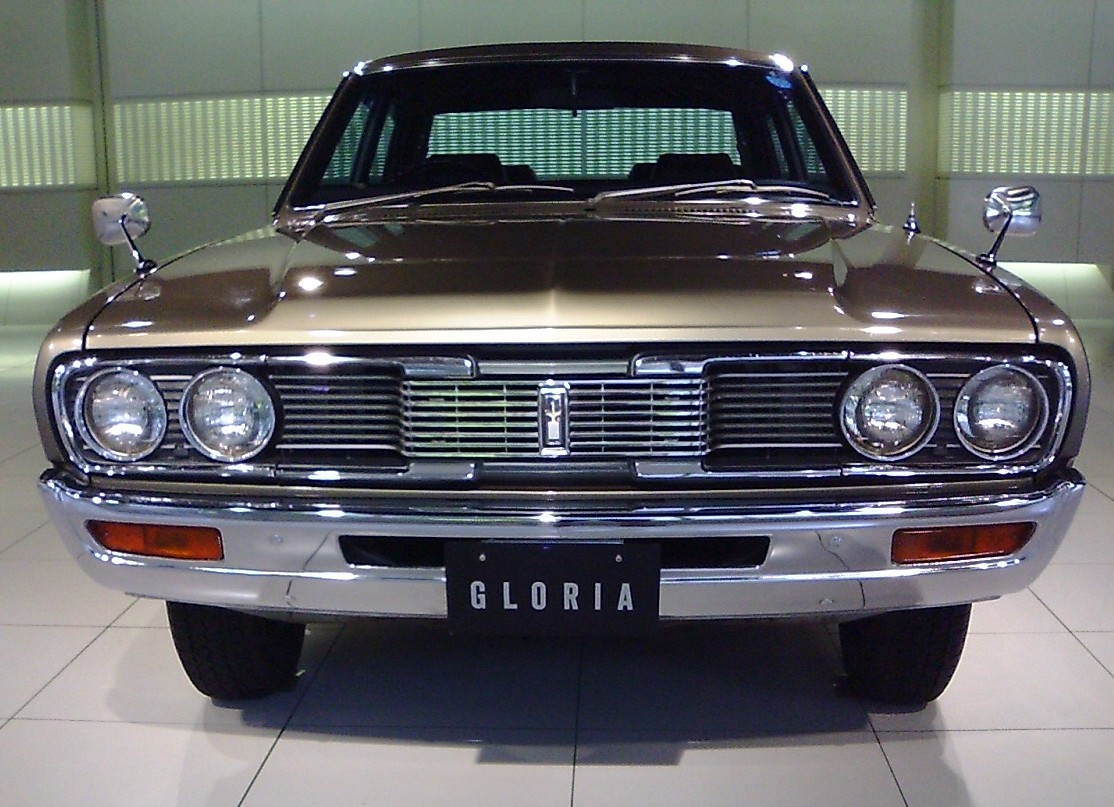
1973 Nissan Gloria Custom Deluxe sedan

== Fifth generation (330; 1975) ==
Most of the information in this article was translated from the Nissan Gloria article on Japanese Wikipedia at ja:日産・グロリア.

Nissan Gloria (330)
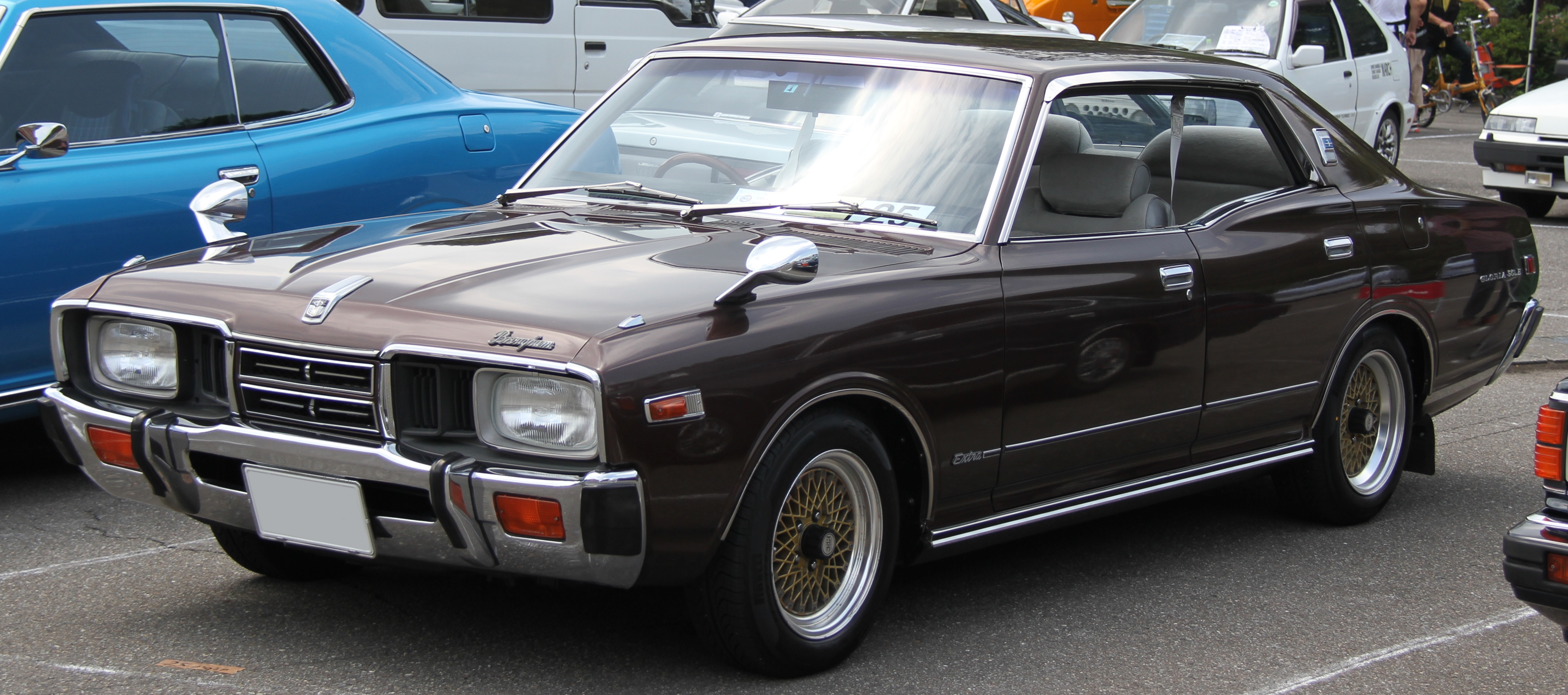
- 1978 Nissan Gloria hardtop 2800E Brougham

Overview
- Model code: 330
- Also called: Nissan Cedric
- Production: 1975–1979
- Assembly: Japan: Musashimurayama; Taiwan: Miaoli

Body and chassis
- Body style: 2-door hardtop coupe 4-door hardtop/sedan/wagon/van
- Layout: FR layout

Powertrain
- Engine: 2.0 L H20 OHV I4; 2.0 L L20/L20E I6; 2.8 L L28/L28E I6; 2.2 L SD22 diesel OHV I4
- Transmission: 3-speed automatic 4-speed manual 5-speed manual

Dimensions
- Wheelbase: 2,690 mm (105.9 in)
- Length: 4,785 mm (188.4 in)(Brougham); 4,690 mm (184.6 in)
- Width: 1,705 mm (67.1 in)(Brougham); 1,695 mm (66.7 in)
- Height: 1,430 mm (56.3 in)
- Curb weight: 1,445 kg (3,186 lb)

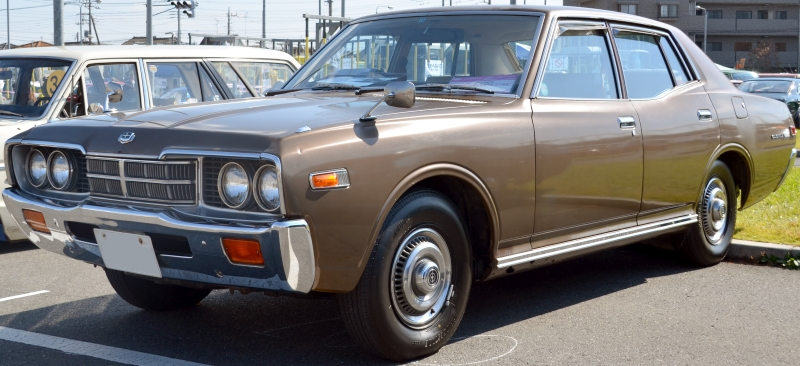
1975 Nissan Gloria Deluxe sedan

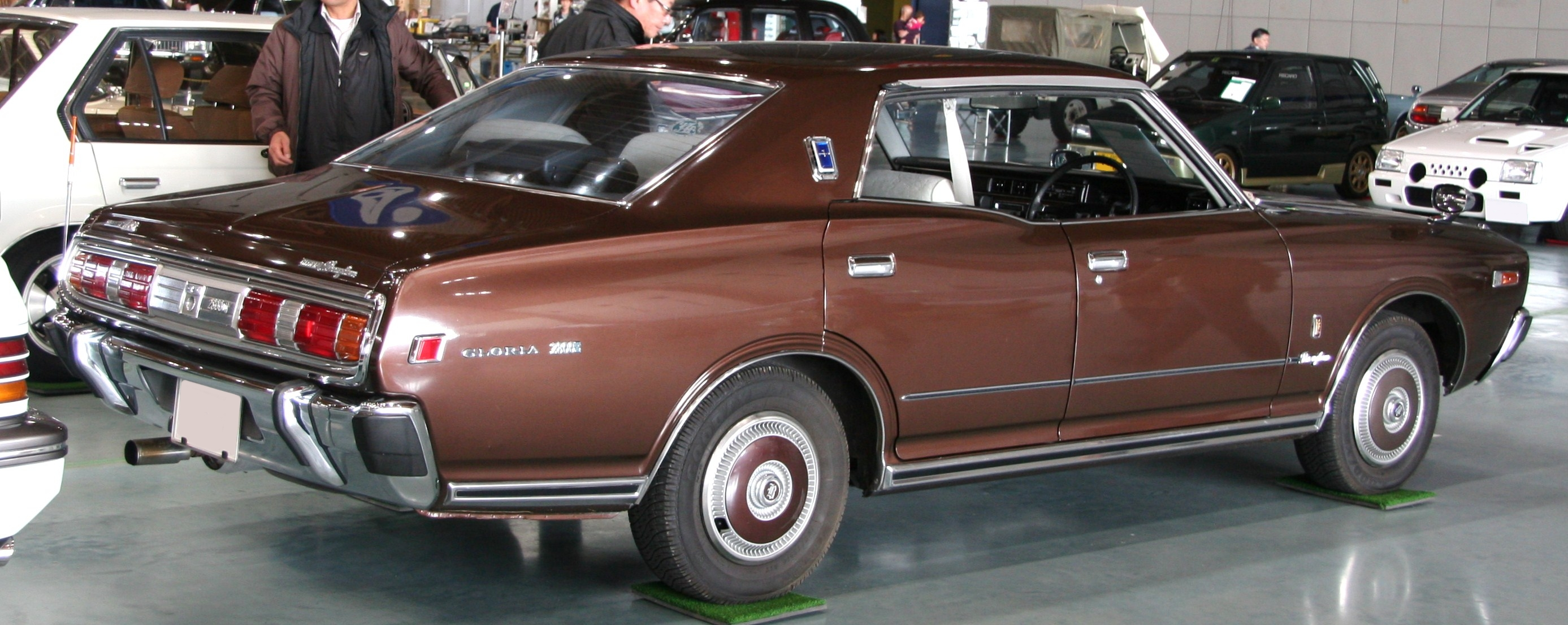
1978 Nissan Gloria 2800E Brougham 4-door hardtop (rear)

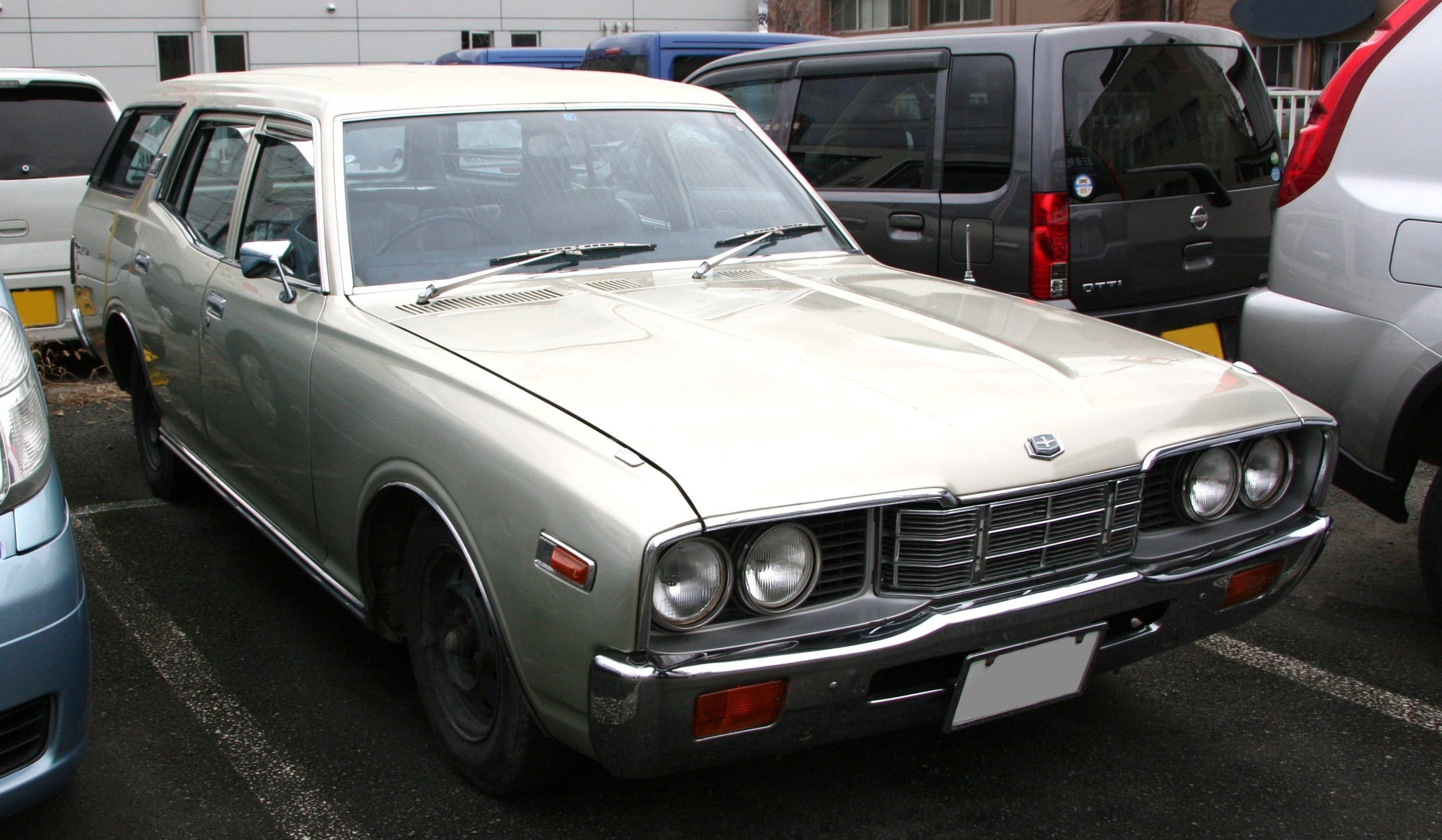
Nissan Gloria Van Deluxe

This generation of the Gloria has been completely shared with the Cedric, essentially being the same vehicle, aside from changes in appearance. Halogen headlights are introduced to the Gloria, along with both a 2-door and 4-door hardtop body style, in addition to a 4-door sedan. The twin carburetors were removed from the small L20 six-cylinder, due to emission regulations. The 2.6 L engine is replaced with the larger 2.8 L version of the same. The overhead valve H20 four-cylinder engine remained in use for the 4-door sedan for taxi usage, usually running on LPG fuel.

October 1975 saw the introduction of the 2000GL-E and the 2000SGL-E, with the "E" designation signifying fuel injection, which was included in the Nissan NAPS emission control technology package..

June 1976 saw cosmetic changes, with halogen headlights being used on all versions except the sedan used for taxi service. Wheel covers are now painted to match the exterior body colour.

June 1977 saw the introduction of the 2800 E Brougham at the top of the options list. The SD22 2.2 L diesel on the basic sedan and wagon, which was a first for the Gloria. Column shift is replaced with a floor-mounted system on the 4-door hardtop.

November 1978 saw another emissions adjustment. Items found on the 2800 Brougham were introduced on the 2000 SGL-E sedan and hardtop. Radial tires are introduced.

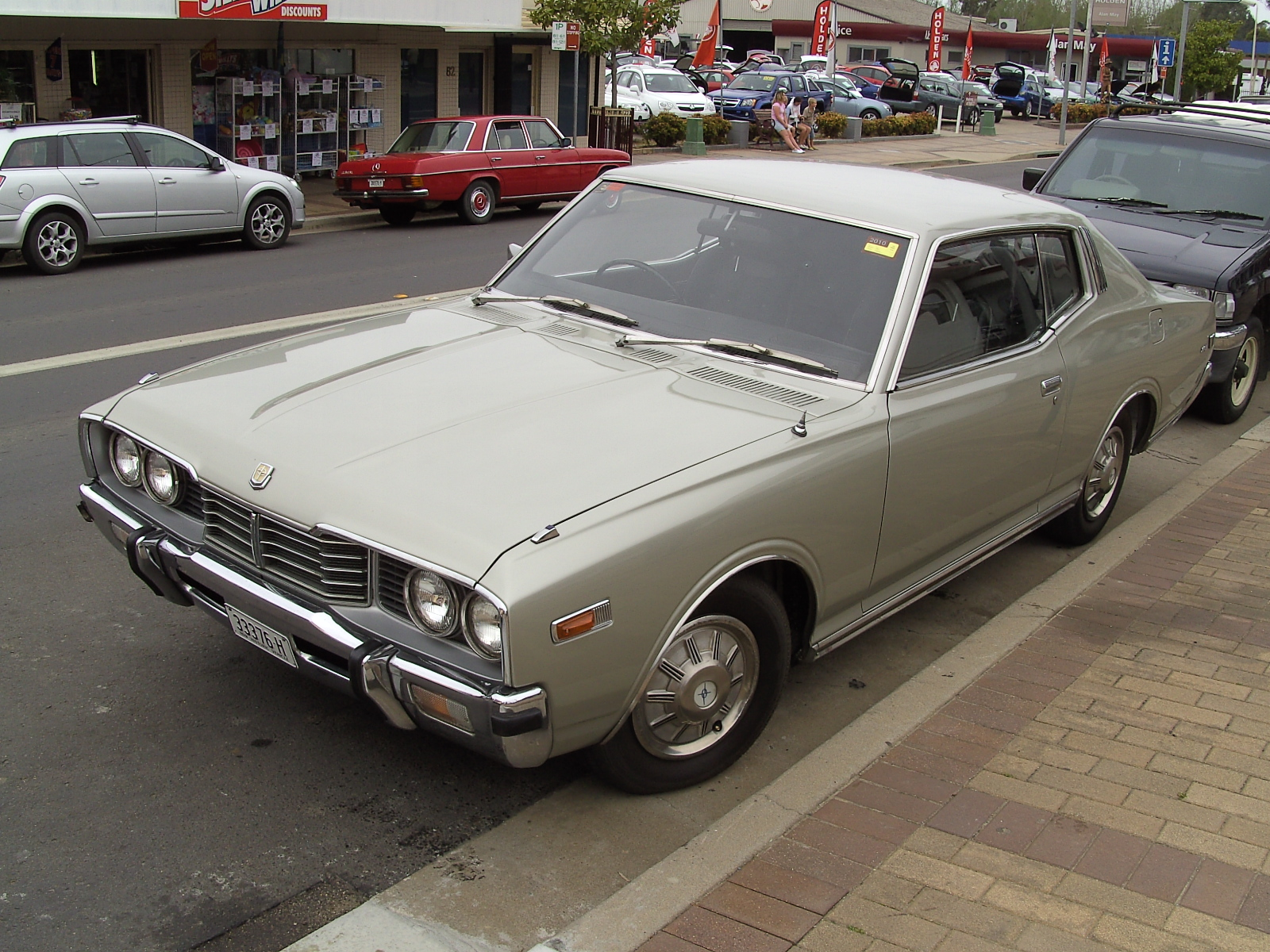
Datsun 260C, 2-door coupe, right-hand drive export version of the Gloria in Australia.

== Sixth generation (430; 1979) ==
Most of the information in this article was translated from the Nissan Gloria article on Japanese Wikipedia at ja:日産・グロリア.

Nissan Gloria (430)
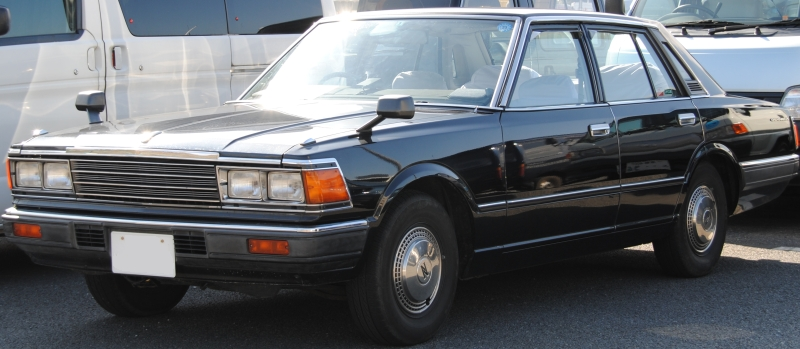
- Nissan Gloria 430 series sedan (200E GL)

Overview
- Model code: 430
- Also called: Nissan Cedric; Yue Loong Victory 2000 (TW); Yue Loong Victory 2400 (TW)
- Production: 1979–1983
- Assembly: Japan: Musashimurayama; Taiwan: Miaoli

Body and chassis
- Body style: 4-door hardtop/sedan/wagon/van
- Layout: FR layout

Powertrain
- Engine: 2.0L Z20P LPG I4; 2.0L L20P LPG I6; 2.0L L20S/L20E I6; 2.0 L L20ET turbo I6; 2.8L L28E I6; 2.0 L SD20 diesel I4; 2.2 L SD22 diesel I4; 2.8 L LD28 diesel I6
- Transmission: 4-speed automatic 3-speed automatic 5-speed manual 4-speed manual

Dimensions
- Wheelbase: 2,690 mm (105.9 in)
- Length: 4,825 mm (190.0 in) (Brougham, Jack Nicklaus); 4,690 mm (184.6 in)
- Width: 1,715 mm (67.5 in)) (Brougham, Jack Nicklaus); 1,695 mm (66.7 in)
- Height: 1,430 mm (56.3 in)
- Curb weight: 1,470 kg (3,240 lb)

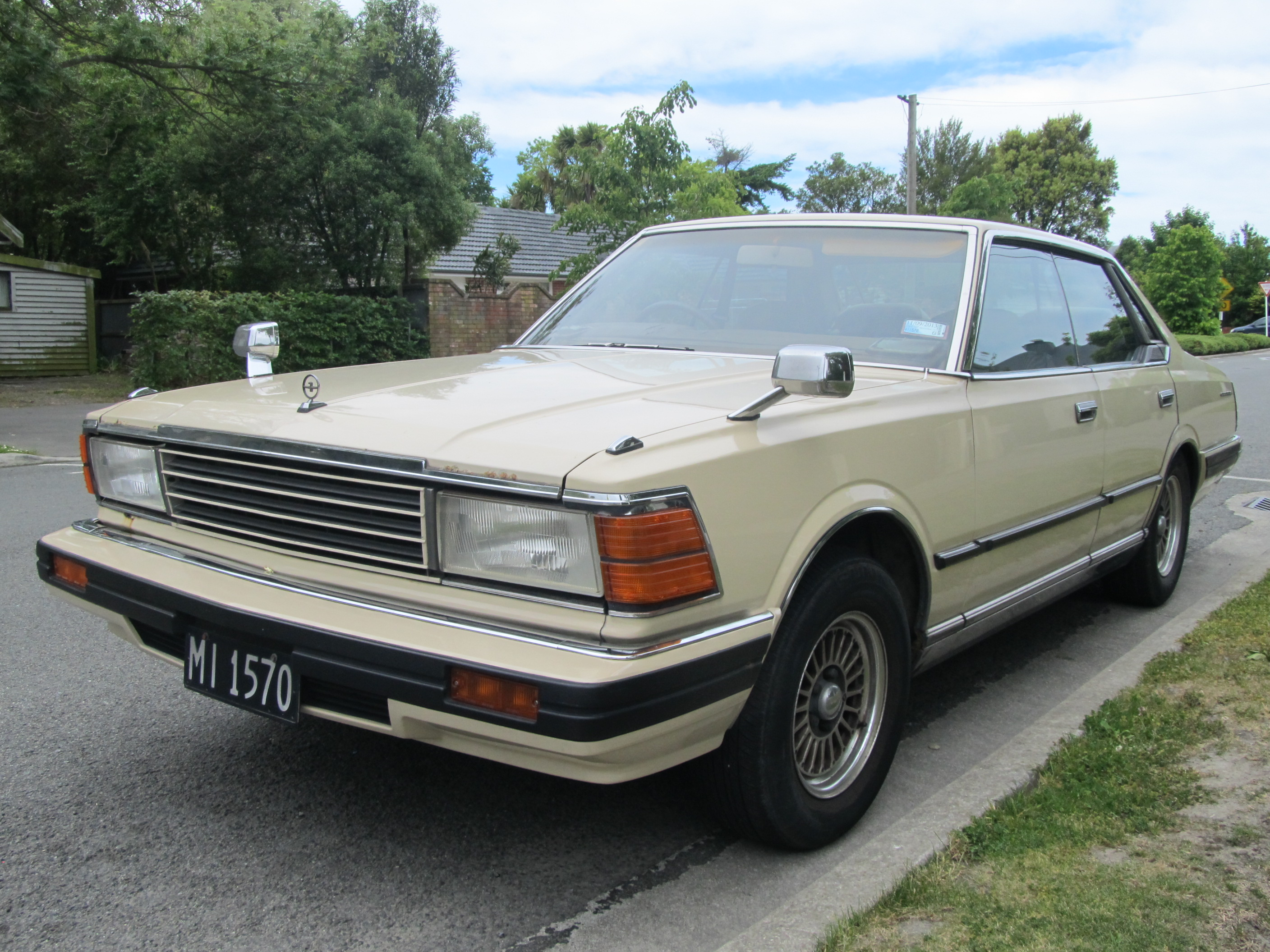
1981 Nissan Gloria 280E Brougham hardtop

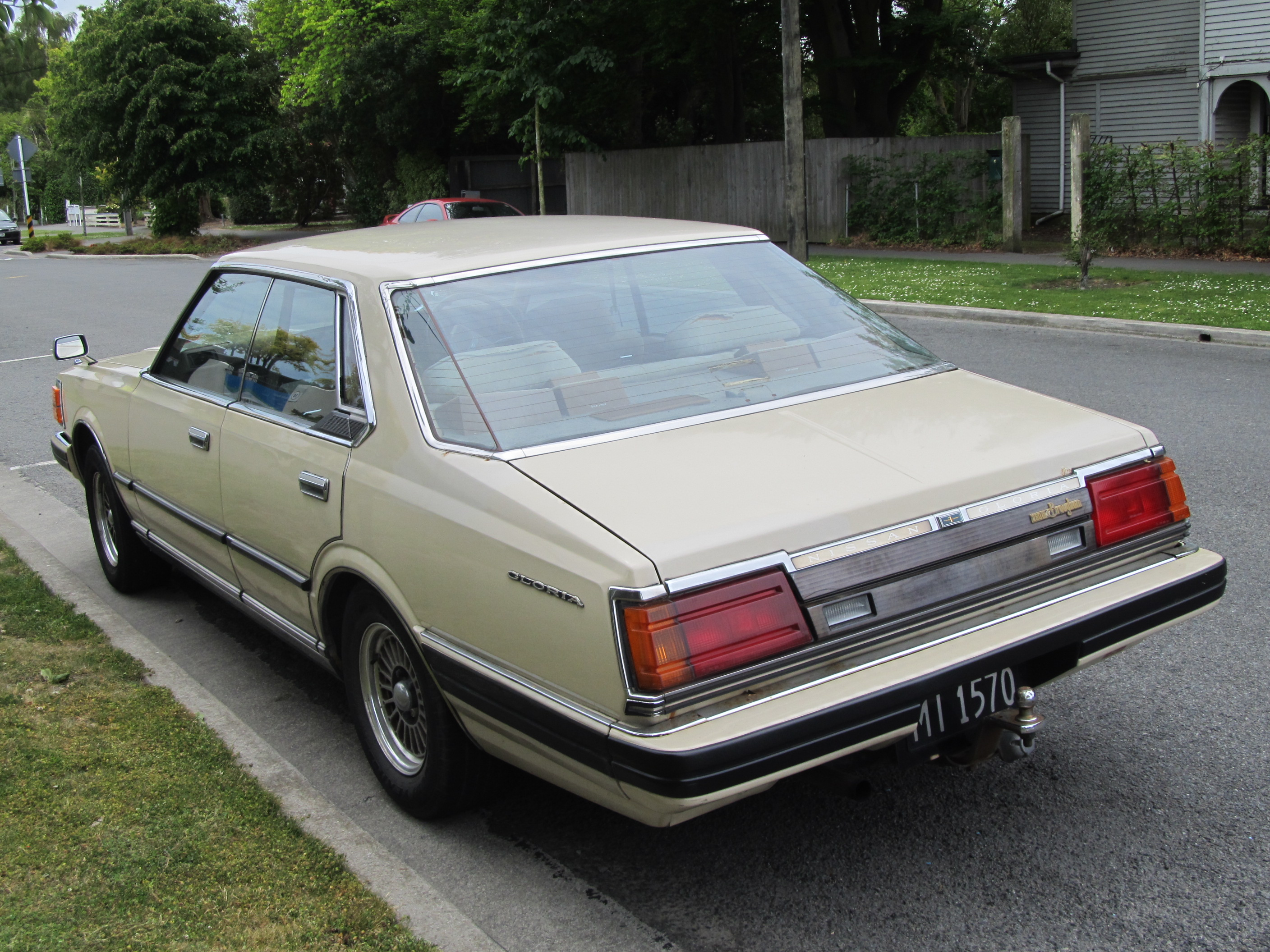
1981 Nissan Gloria 280E Brougham hardtop

June 1979 saw a completely redesigned Nissan Gloria with assistance with Pininfarina, with a more simple and straightforward appearance over the previous generation, and exchanging the single unit halogen headlights with 4 sealed beam headlight units. Computer-controlled fuel injection was added to more engines offered, with the "E" designation signifying fuel injection.

The 2-door hardtop coupe was discontinued and replaced with the luxury sports coupé Nissan Leopard.

Trim levels were expanded, and were designated the Brougham, SGL Extra, SGL, GL and the Jack Nicklaus edition which was very similar to the Brougham, which offered the turbo. Other trim levels were the Turbo S, Custom S, Custom Deluxe, Deluxe and the Standard at the bottom. The SD22 diesel engine was offered from 1979 on the sedan GL and DX. The Standard Sedan and Van were discontinued April 1981. In October 1979, the 6-cylinder LD28 diesel was added with the automatic transmission selector moved from column shift to a floor-mounted system. December 1979 was when the first turbo L20ET was introduced.

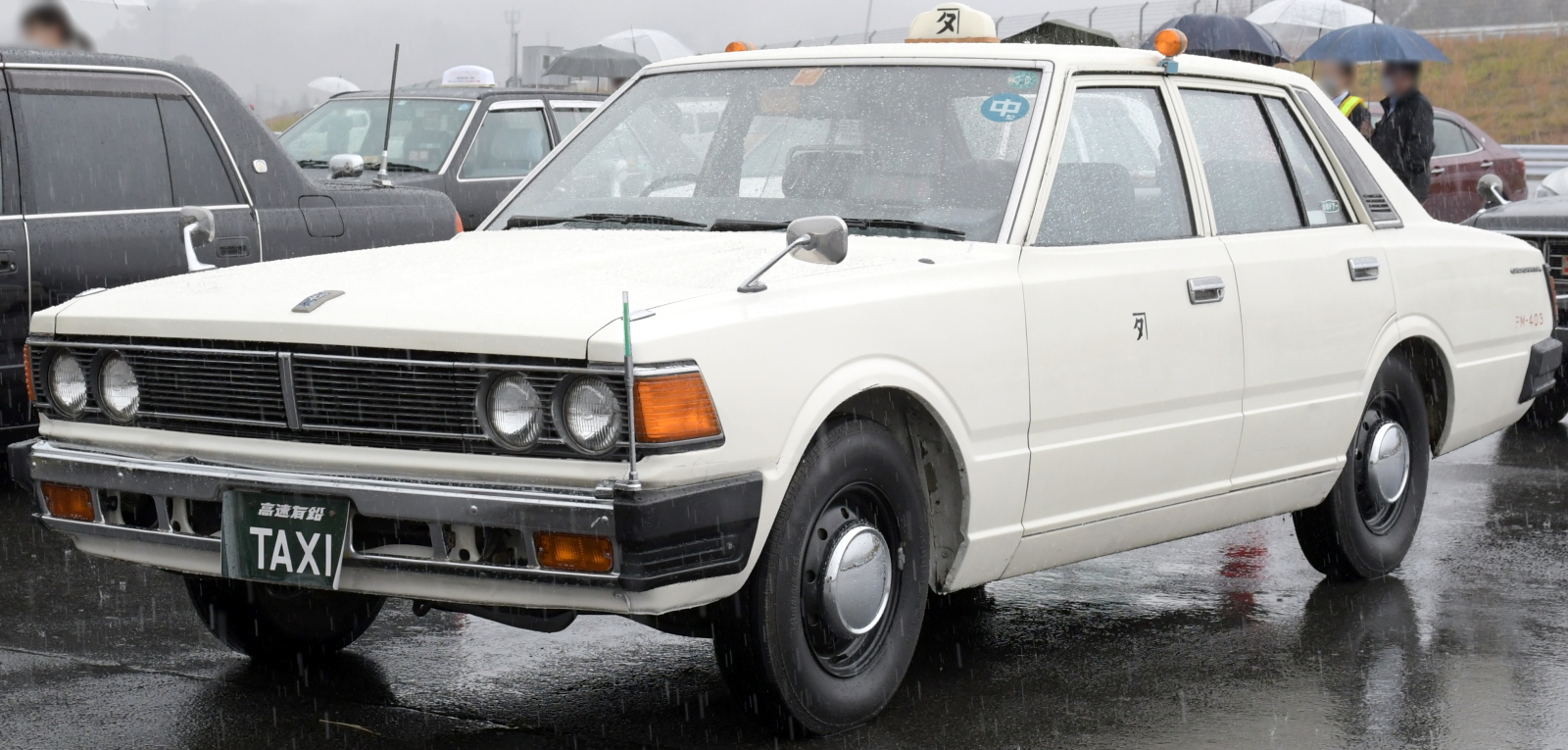
Nissan Gloria 200E Standard with round headlights (for taxi use)

February 1980 saw the LD28 6-cylinder offered with a 5-speed manual transmission installed with a floor-mounted shifter, but leaving the column shift for the 4-speed manual transmission. Later in April of that same year the Turbo Brougham appeared. A glass moonroof was also offered on SGL-F models.

In April 1981 both models were facelifted, with redesigned front grille, headlamp cluster, tail lamp, and "C Pillar" trim.

In order to avoid confusion between the sixth-generation Gloria and Cedric (both these cars had identical body design and headlights for the 1979 model) Nissan gave them new and different radiator grilles; vertical grilles for the Cedric and a horizontal grille for the Gloria.

== Seventh generation (Y30; 1983) ==
Most of the information in this article was translated from the Nissan Gloria article on Japanese Wikipedia at ja:日産・グロリア.

Nissan Gloria (Y30)
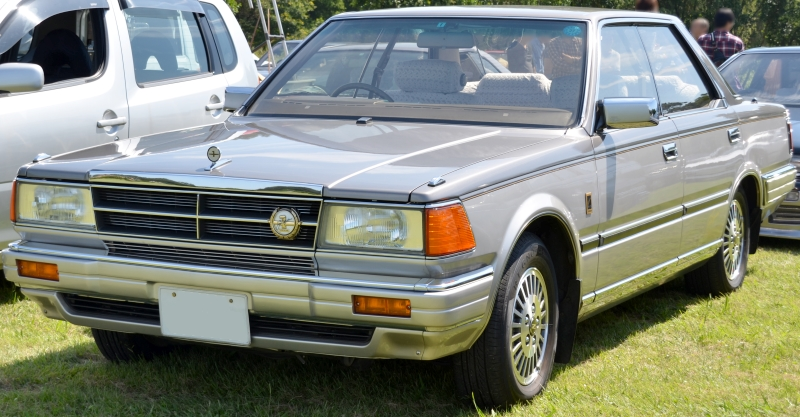
- 1983 Nissan Gloria V30 Turbo hardtop Jack Nicklaus

Overview
- Model code: Y30/Y31
- Also called: Nissan Cedric; Yue Loong Victory 830 (TW); Yue Loong Victory 3000 (TW)
- Production: 1983–1987
- Assembly: Japan: Musashimurayama; Taiwan: Miaoli

Body and chassis
- Body style: 4-door hardtop/sedan 5-door wagon/van
- Layout: FR layout

Powertrain
- Engine: petrol: 1,974 cc CA20S I4 (NY30); 1,998 cc VG20E V6 (Y30); 1,998 cc VG20ET turbo V6 (Y30); 2,960 cc VG30S/VG30E V6 (PY30); 2,960 cc VG30ET turbo V6 (PY30); LPG: 1,974 cc CA20P I4 (NJY30); 1,998 cc L20P LPG I6 (MY30); diesel: 2,289 cc SD23 I4 (export only); 2,792 cc LD28 I6 (HY30); 2,825 cc RD28 I6 (UY30)
- Transmission: 4-speed automatic 4-speed manual 5-speed manual

Dimensions
- Wheelbase: 2,730 mm (107.5 in)
- Length: 4,690 mm (184.6 in); 4,860 mm (191.3 in) (VG30)
- Width: 1,690 mm (66.5 in)); 1,720 mm (67.7 in) (VG30)
- Height: 1,435 mm (56.5 in); 1,500 mm (59.1 in) (Wagon/Van)
- Curb weight: 1,275–1,505 kg (2,811–3,318 lb)

June 22, 1983 saw a major restyle of the previous generation for all versions of the Gloria. Sedans used for taxi service utilized four round headlights whereas other versions upgraded to European style halogen headlights.

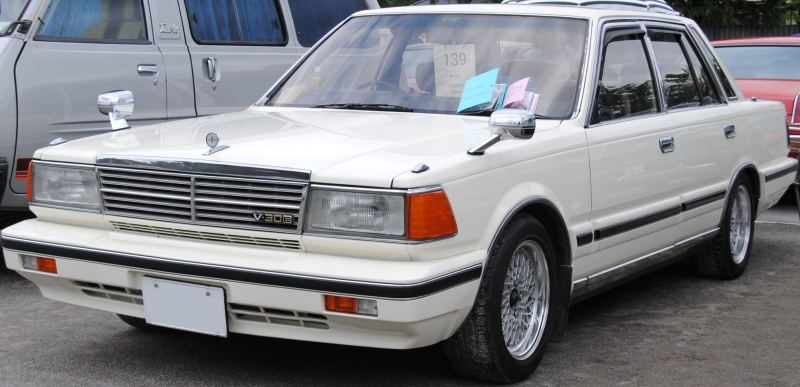
1983 Nissan Gloria V30E Brougham sedan

The straight-six engine, which had been used for many years, was upgraded to an all new V6-design, called the VG series engine which made its debut in the Cedric/Gloria. This was the first mass production V6 engine built in Japan. The VG range uses fuel injection rather than carburetors for fuel delivery. The VG20ET was turbocharged, for better performance while staying within the Japanese tax parameters for a compact car. The twin-carbureted four-cylinder CA20S engine was fitted to the lowest-spec versions (standard, De Luxe). This four-cylinder engine was also available in a version built to run on LPG fuel, meant to be used for taxi service and other professional usage. From February 1984 there was also a six-cylinder L20P, which also ran on LPG. In June 1984 the powerful 3-litre VG30ET turbo V6 was introduced.

Trim levels offered were the Brougham, SGL, Grand Edition, GL Grand Edition, GL and the Standard. In June 1984 the Brougham VIP appeared as the top level car. The Jack Nicklaus special edition, introduced with the previous edition, was a sales success for the company and continued to be offered as a hardtop and only with a turbocharged engine.

Beginning June 1985, Nissan offered a self-levelling suspension for the rear wheels on hardtop and sedan top trim packages. They also introduced "Super Sonic Suspension" system, which featured a sonar module mounted under the front bumper that scanned the road surface and adjusted the suspension accordingly via actuators mounted on all four MacPherson strut towers. There was also a switch next to the steering wheel that allowed the driver to change between "Auto", "Soft", "Medium" and "Hard" settings. The speed-sensitive rack-and-pinion power steering could also be separately reduced for a sporting feeling, and the suspension setting would modify both the steering feel and the shift points on the automatic transmission. The feature was only installed on V30 Turbo Brougham VIP sedans and hardtops.

To enhance rear passenger comfort and convenience, the four-door hardtop front driver and passenger seat belt shoulder strap was connected at the top to the ceiling, however, the upper portion could be detached, with the shoulder strap emerging from the side door support, resting on the driver's and passenger's shoulder. This provided rear passengers an unobstructed view from the rear seat without the seat belt hanging from the ceiling when the windows were retracted. The upper part would then swing up to the ceiling and could be fastened into place. All sedan and hardtop trim packages designated as Brougham also provided a fold down footrest for rear seat passengers opposite the driver where the lower half of the front seatback would fold down to the passenger, like a tray table, whereby it would accommodate the passengers legs and feet while the rear passenger seat could further extend and recline. Nissan introduced a PIN activated keyless entry feature on the front exterior door handles. The doors could be unlocked, trunk opened and all windows retracted, as well as rolling up the windows and locking the vehicle.

June 1985 saw mild exterior changes, with the biggest mechanical change being a variable nozzle for the VG20ET turbocharged engine. The diesel straight-six engine LD28 was also upgraded to the RD28 Straight-6 engine.

Export versions usually received the diesel sixes or the three-litre six-cylinder engines, although there was also a version with the four-cylinder 2.3-litre SD23 engine, producing 74 PS (54 kW) (SAE net). With nearly exactly the same specifications as the Japanese market engine, the fuel-injected three-litre six claimed 166 PS SAE net (122 kW) or 155 PS DIN (114 kW) in export, as opposed to 180 PS JIS (132 kW) in Japan. There was also a carbureted version available in some markets such as the Middle East (VG30S), with 148 PS (109 kW) at a lowly 4,800 rpm.

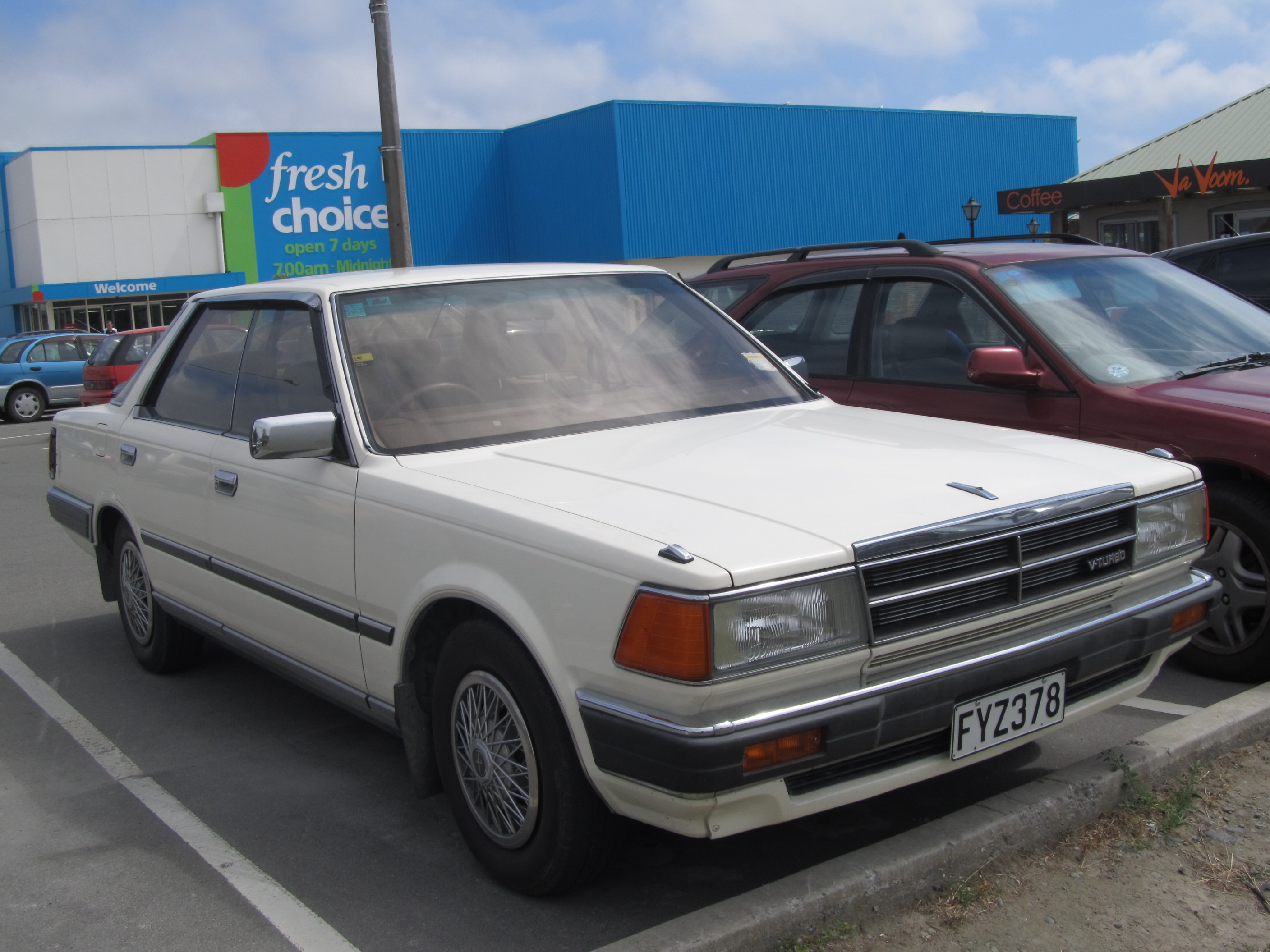
1983 Nissan Gloria V20 Turbo Brougham hardtop

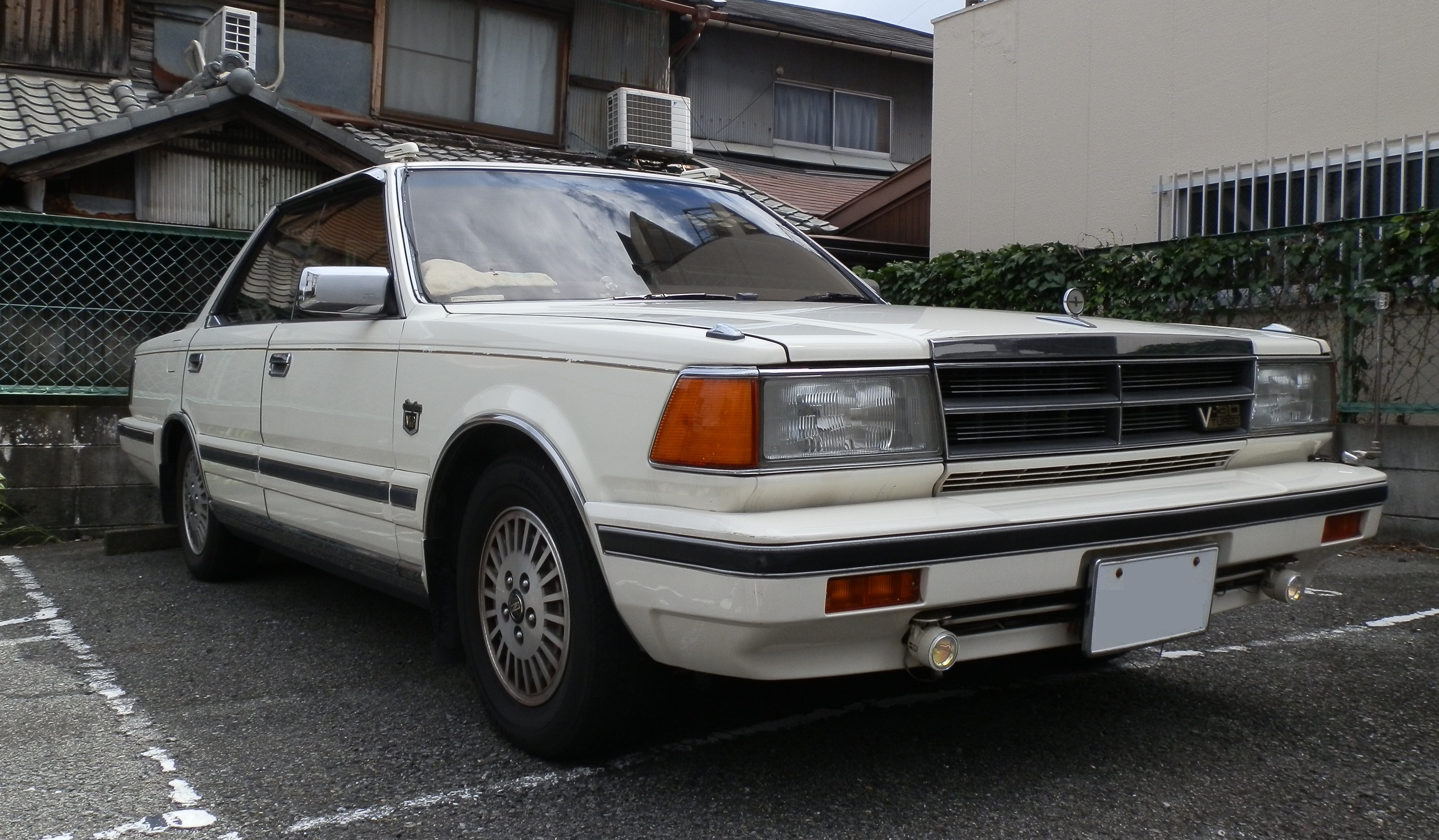
1984 Nissan Gloria V30E Brougham VIP hardtop

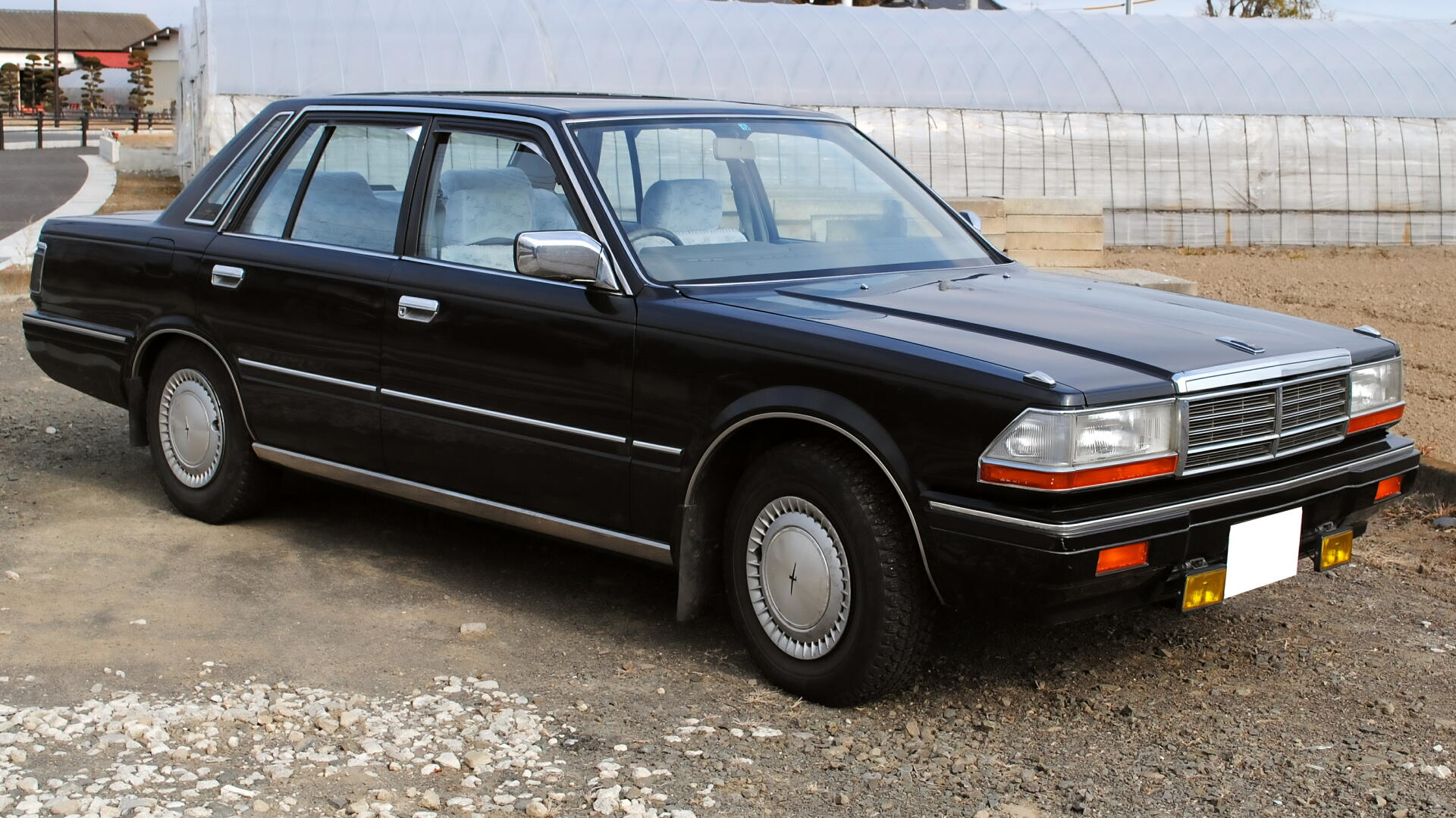
1985 Nissan Gloria V20·E GL sedan

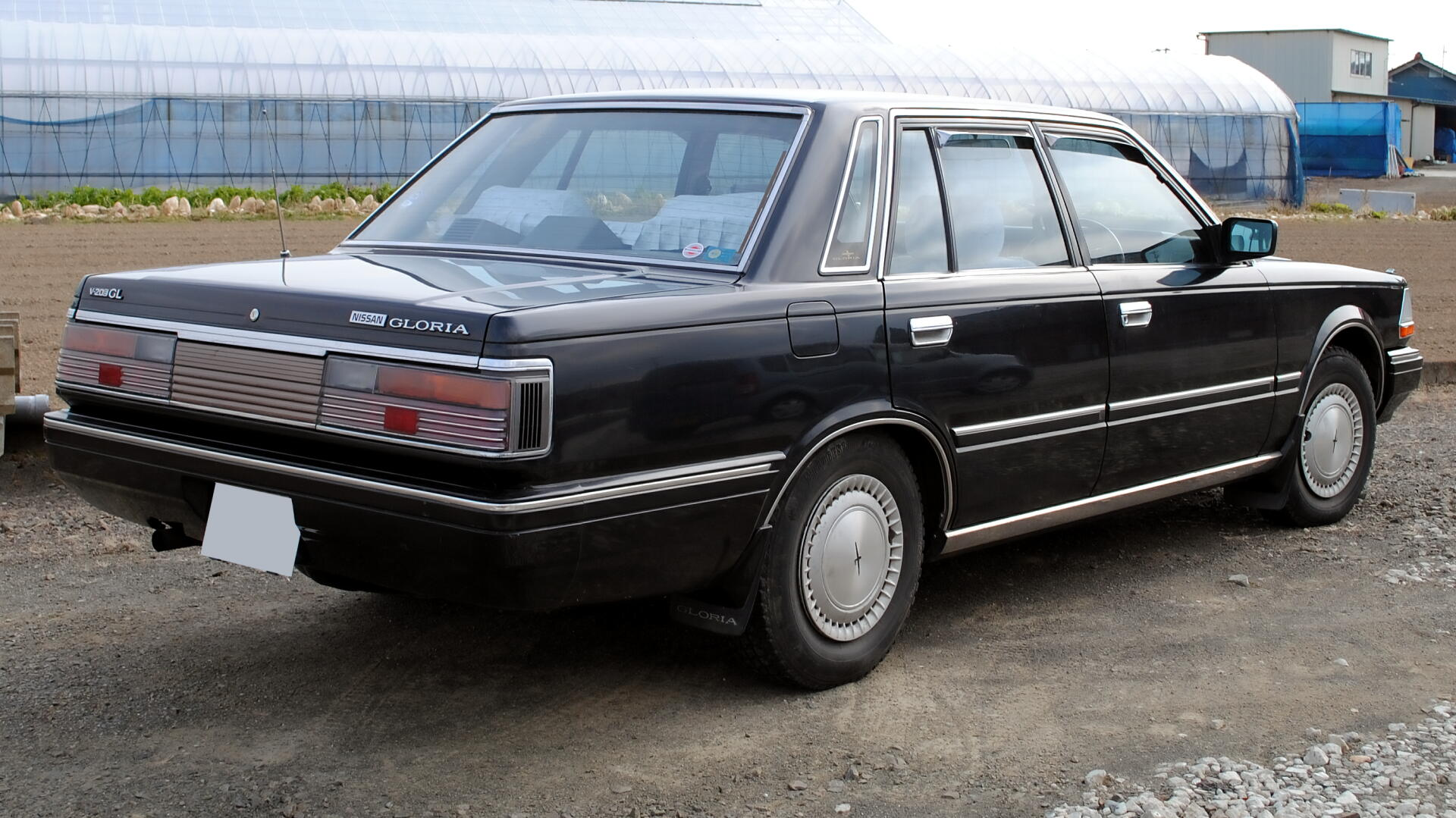
1985 Nissan Gloria V20·E GL sedan (rear)

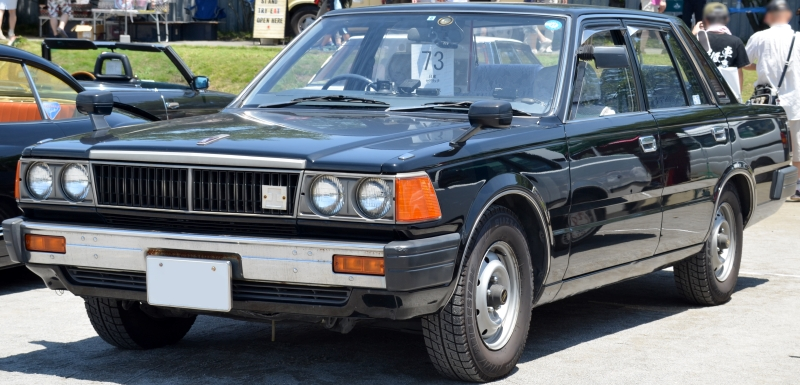
Nissan Gloria Standard sedan

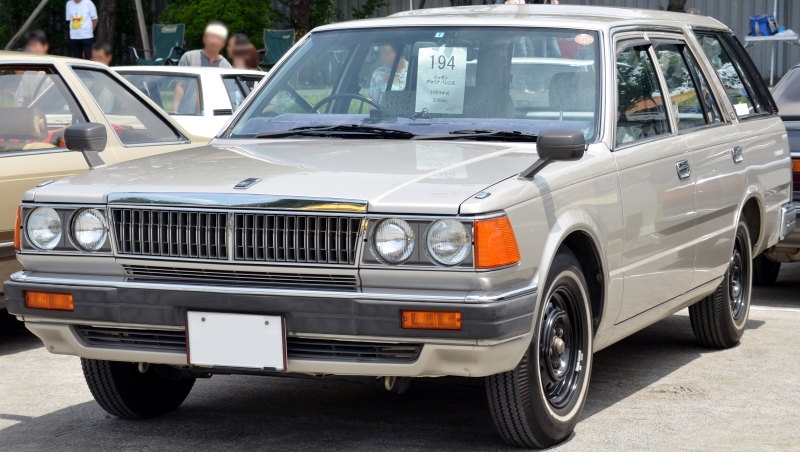
Nissan Gloria V20E Deluxe Van with round headlights

== Eighth generation (Y31; 1987) ==
Most of the information in this article was translated from the Nissan Gloria article on Japanese Wikipedia at ja:日産・グロリア.

Nissan Gloria (Y31)
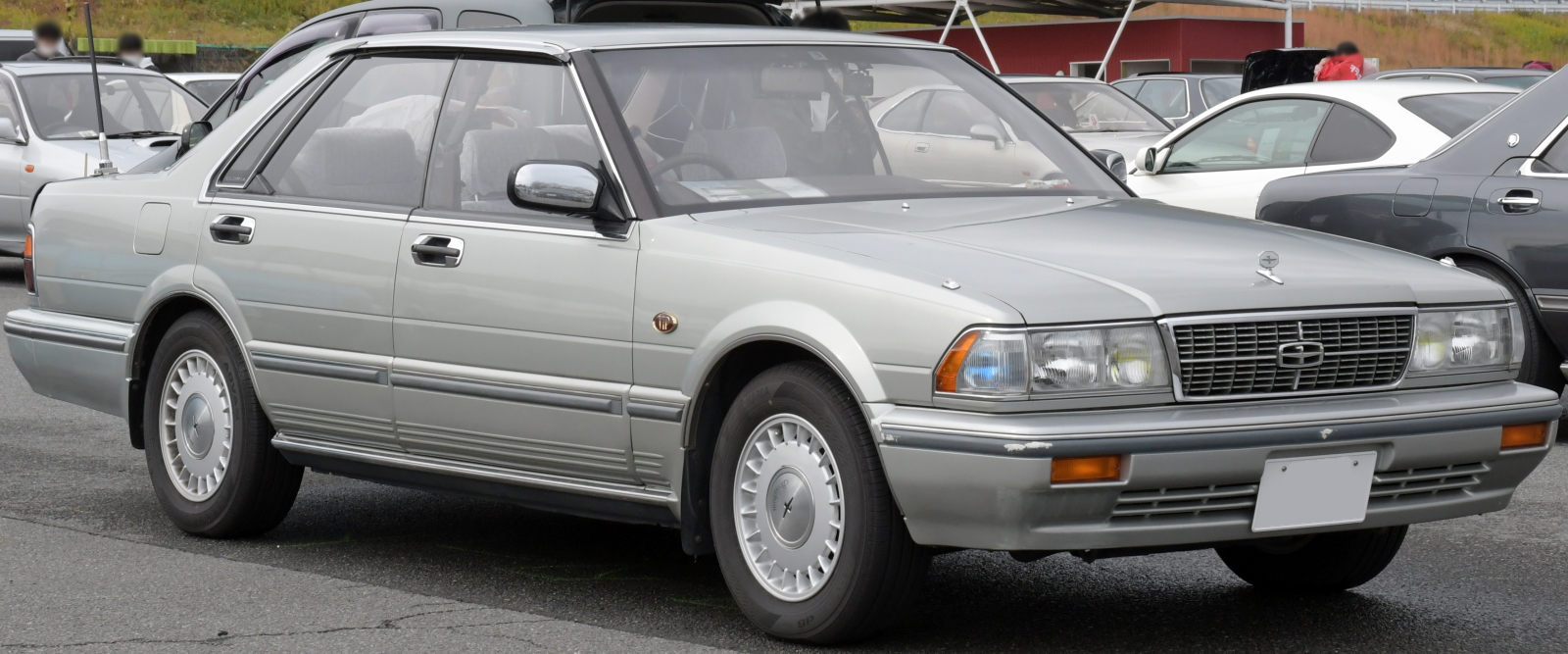
- 1989 Nissan Gloria V30 Turbo Brougham VIP hardtop

Overview
- Model code: Y31
- Also called: Nissan Cedric
- Production: 1987–1991 (hardtop); 1987–1999 (sedan)
- Assembly: Japan: Musashimurayama

Body and chassis
- Body style: 4-door hardtop/sedan
- Layout: FR layout
- Related: Nissan Cedric Y31; Nissan Crew; Nissan Gloria Cima Y31; Nissan Leopard Y31; Nissan Cefiro A31

Powertrain
- Engine: Petrol: 2.0 L VG20E V6; 2.0 L VG20DET DOHC turbo V6; 3.0 L VG30E V6; 3.0 L VG30ET turbo V6; 3.0 L VG30DE DOHC V6; 3.0 L VG30DET DOHC turbo V6; LPG: 2.0 L CA20P I4; 2.0 L NA20P I4; 2.0 L RB20P I6; diesel: 2.8 L RD28 I6
- Transmission: 4/5-speed manual 4/5-speed automatic

Dimensions
- Wheelbase: 2,735 mm (107.7 in)
- Length: 4,860 mm (191.3 in) (3.0 L); 4,690 mm (184.6 in)
- Width: 1,720 mm (67.7 in) (3.0 L); 1,695 mm (66.7 in)
- Height: 1,380 mm (54.3 in) (3.0 L); 1,405 mm (55.3 in)
- Curb weight: 1,540–1,410 kg (3,400–3,110 lb)

The Y31 sedan was introduced in 1987. The Y30 hardtop was replaced by the succeeding Y32, and the Y30 Wagon/Van version was not replaced. After this generation, Glorias were only available to private customers in four-door hardtop guise. Engines available continue to be the newly developed VG series engine as a result of Project 901, with the VG20DET adding DOHC, another first for Nissan. June 1987 saw a special edition Gloria intended for parade usage, removing the roof structure from the hardtop body style. "Super Sonic Suspension" was no longer offered and instead the MacPherson struts were optionally installed with internal air chambers combined with trailing lower control arms, while the standard suspension consisted of MacPherson struts for the front wheels, and coil springs and shock absorbers for the rear suspension; cars thus equipped carry an "A" in their chassis code (PAY31 rather than PY31).

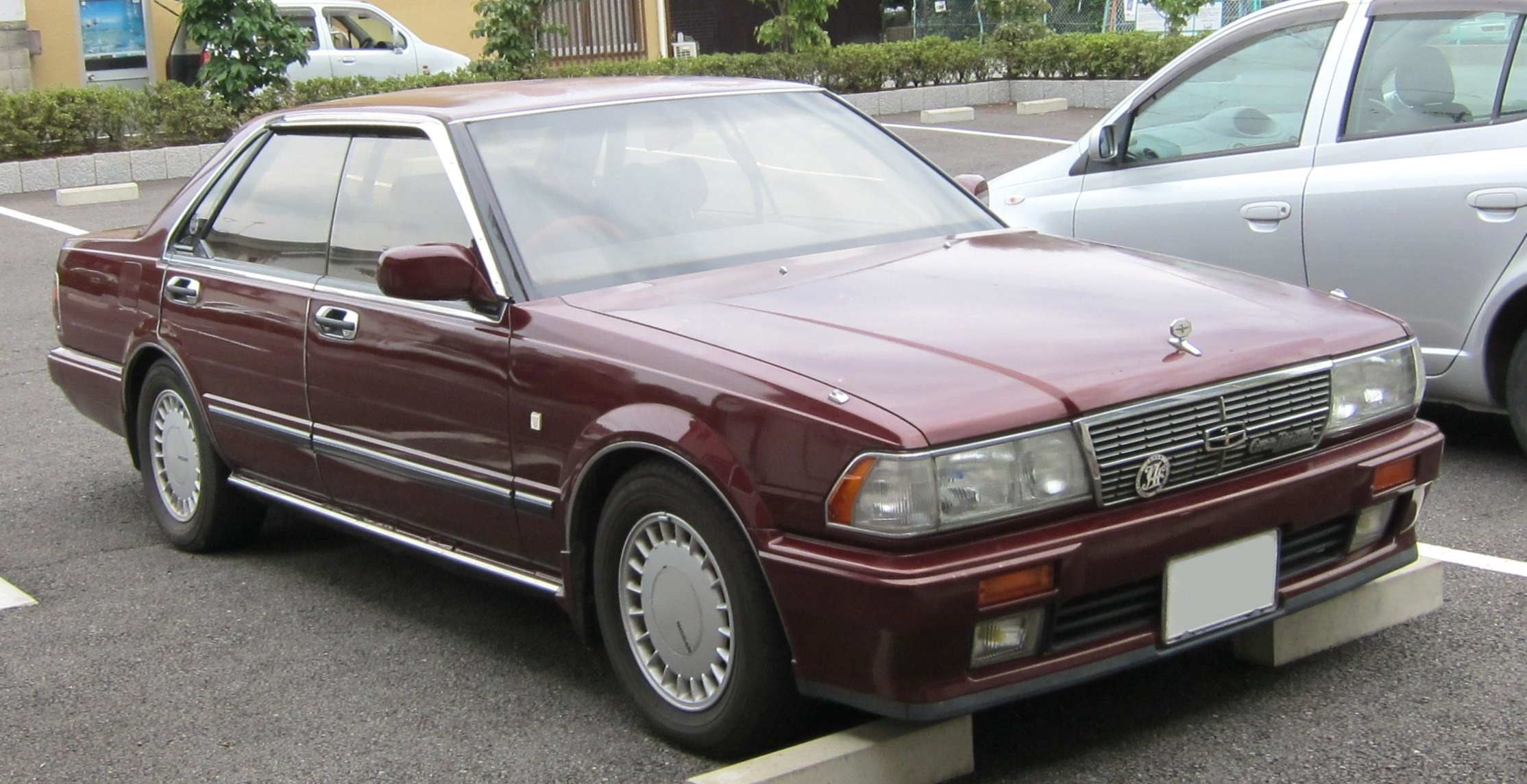
Nissan Gloria Gran Turismo SV hardtop

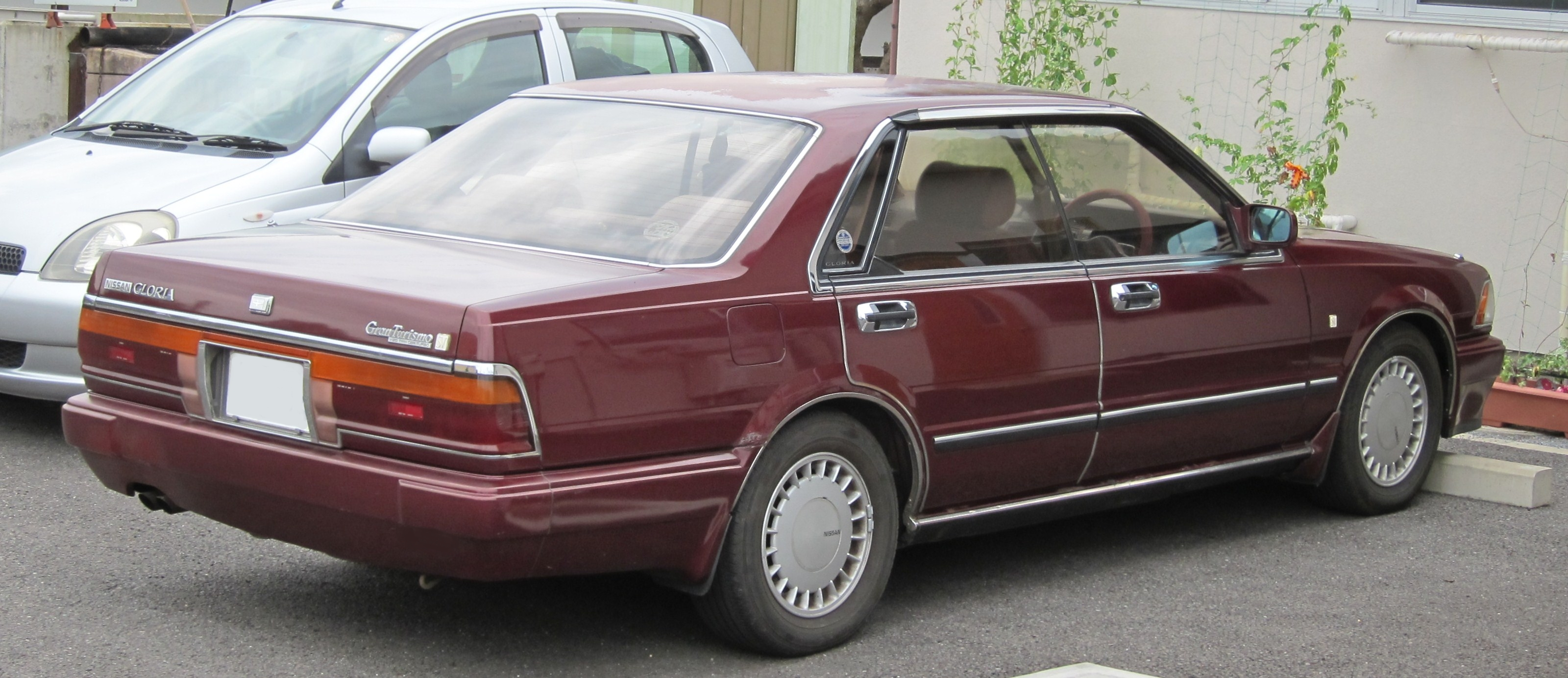
Nissan Gloria Gran Turismo SV hardtop

The four-speed automatic transmission is now computer controlled for smoother shifts. The transmission now exclusively uses a floor-mounted gear shifter, and a five-speed manual transmission was still available. The rear suspension was upgraded to multi-link independent setup. Trim levels are standard, Custom, Super Custom, Classic, Classic SV, Gran Turismo, and Brougham VIP. There was also a long wheelbase model built by Autech called the Royal Limousine. The Gran Turismo received more sport-oriented styling, adding a youthful appearance, which found new, younger, buyers. The sporty GranTurismo SV version had short bumpers with a body kit, and was powered by the turbo twin cam VG20DET engine. The sedan version of the Y31 was facelifted at the launch of the Y32; it was kept in production for professional use and as a more traditional, lower cost alternative to the hardtop-only succeeding generations. The Gloria is mechanically related to the Crew, although the former is larger.

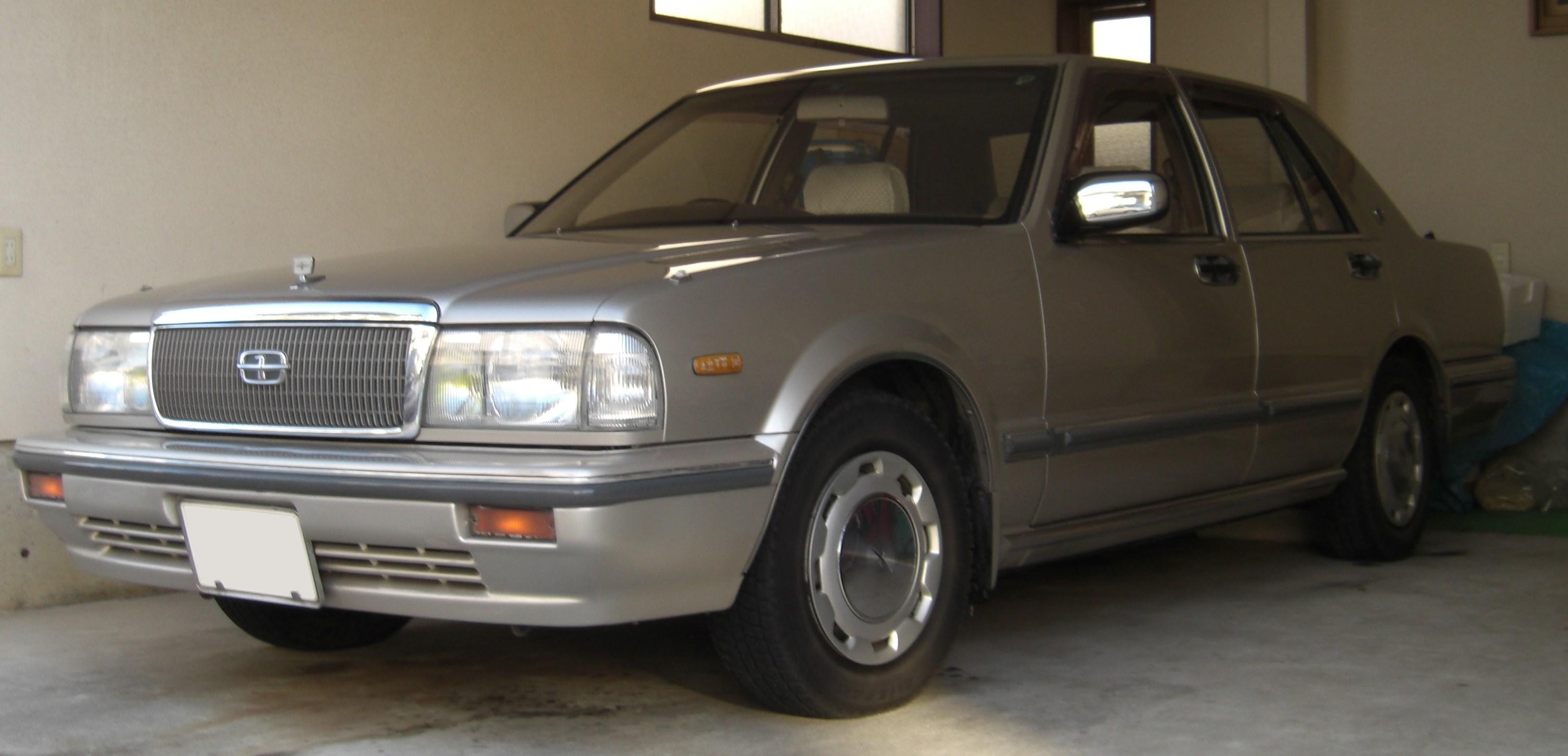
The facelift model 1991 Nissan Gloria Classic SV sedan.

The Gloria competed for buyers with related Nissan vehicles that shared platforms used for the Gloria, specifically, the Nissan Cima, Nissan Leopard and the Nissan Cedric, as well as other sport-oriented vehicles, such as the Nissan Cefiro, Nissan Skyline and Nissan Laurel. The Gloria Y31 can be distinguished from its sibling, the Cedric Y31 by the taillights.

The 4-speed automatic transmission is now computer controlled for smoother shifts. The transmission now exclusively uses a floor mounted gear shifter, and a 5-speed manual transmission is still available. The rear suspension was upgraded to multi-link independent setup. Trim levels start with the VIP Brougham, Gran Tourismo, Classic SV, Classic and Super Custom. The Gran Turismo received more sport-oriented styling, adding a youthful appearance, which found new, younger, buyers. To enhance rear passenger comfort and convenience, the four-door hardtop front driver and passenger seat belt shoulder strap was connected at the top to the ceiling, however, the upper portion could be detached, with the shoulder strap emerging from the side door support, resting on the driver's and passenger's shoulder. This provided rear passengers an unobstructed view from the rear seat without the seat belt hanging from the ceiling when the windows were retracted. The upper part would then swing up to the ceiling and could be fastened into place.

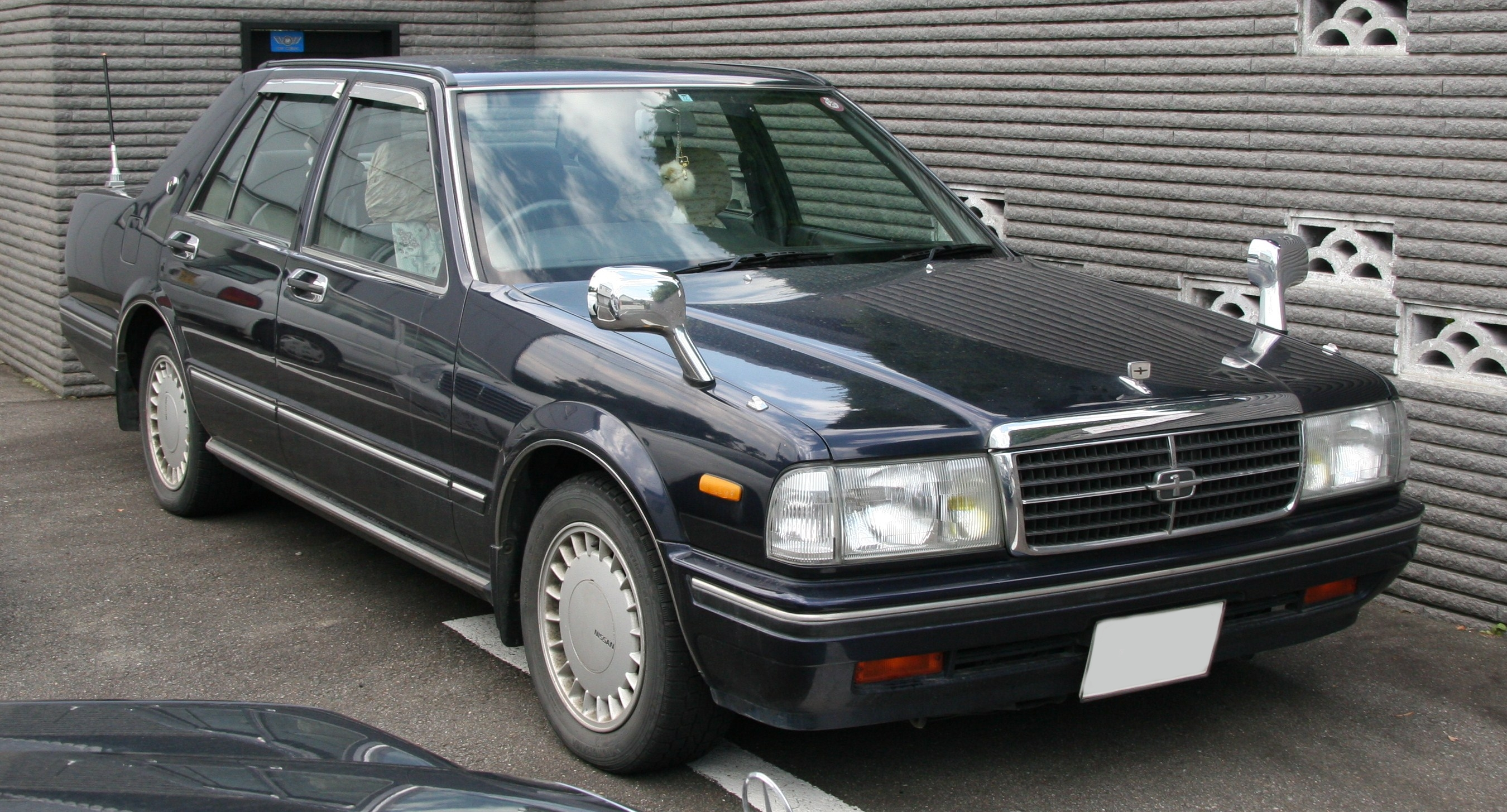
The facelift model 1995 Nissan Gloria Classic sedan.

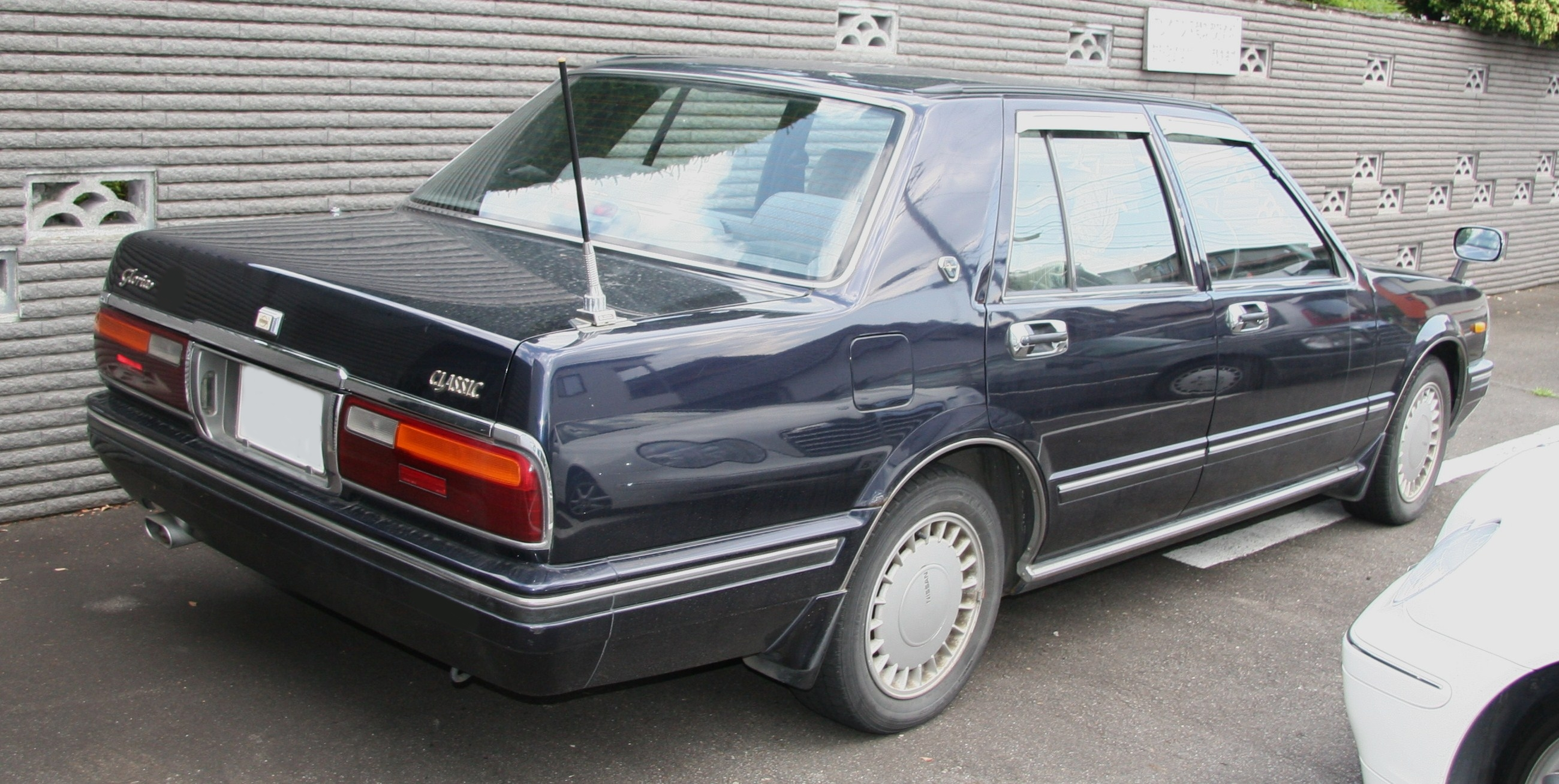
Rear view of facelift model 1995 Nissan Gloria Classic sedan.

In June 1998 the Gloria sedan (still sold for either private or professional uses) was updated. Equipment levels were improved, now featuring standard double airbags up front (private cars only), a redesigned dashboard and interior for private cars and higher-end professional models, and other minor changes such as replacing the conventional antenna at the rear with one integrated into the rear windshield. The facelifted version of the Y31 Gloria was discontinued in July 1999 and merged into the Cedric Sedan lineup, which continued to be produced until 2014 for taxi sales.

Professional use Gloria sedans received lower powered engines, typically powered by LPG or (less popularly) diesel engines. Lower end models received the four-cylinder NA20P while better equipped versions like the Classic, Classic SV, and Brougham used the six-cylinder RB20P. The NA20P produces 82 PS (60 kW); power increased to 85 PS (63 kW) at the time of the June 1998 updates. Autech also offered an LPG-powered version of the VG20 engine (called the VG20LPG; when later built officially by Nissan, this engine became the VG20P), only in Brougham trim with a four-speed automatic and intended for police or special purpose uses.

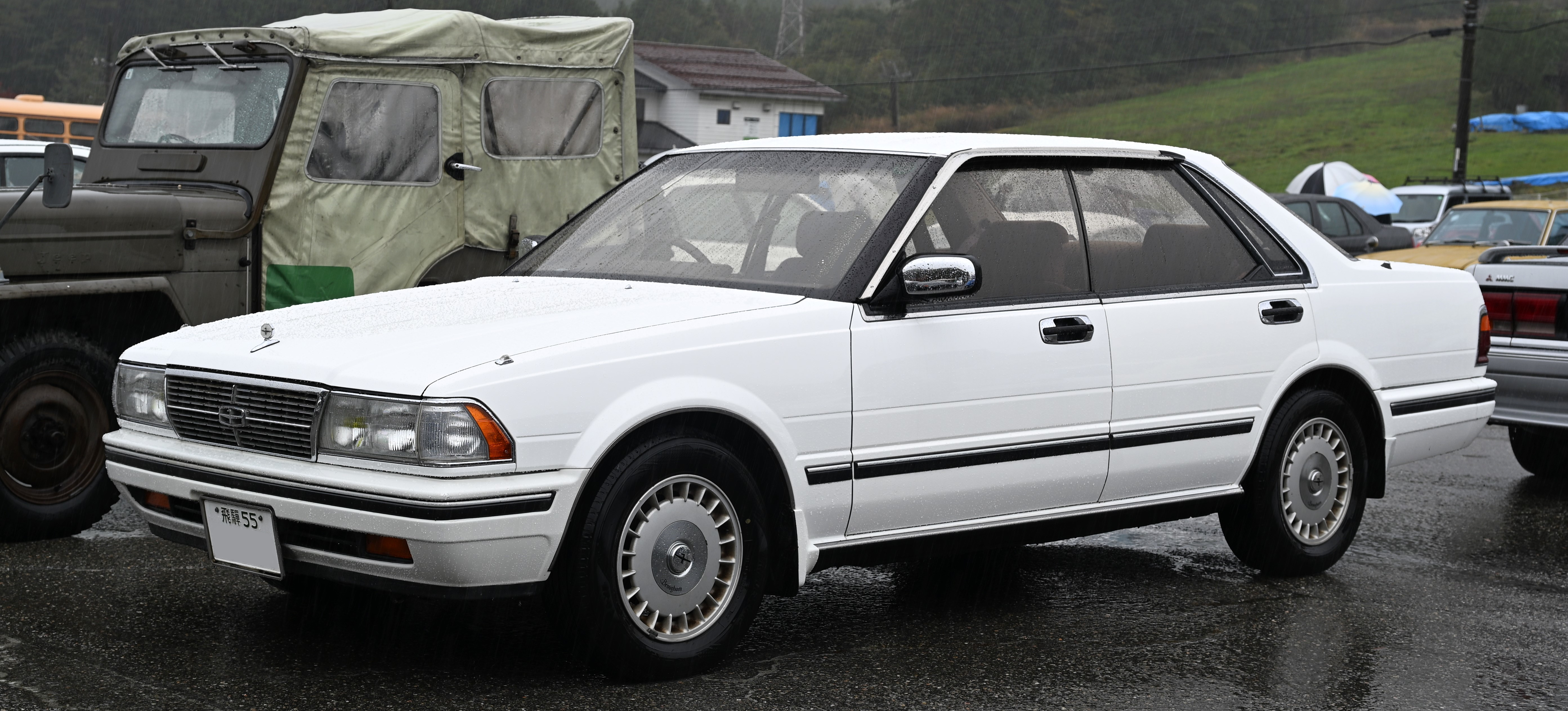
1987 Nissan Gloria V20 Twincam Turbo Brougham hardtop

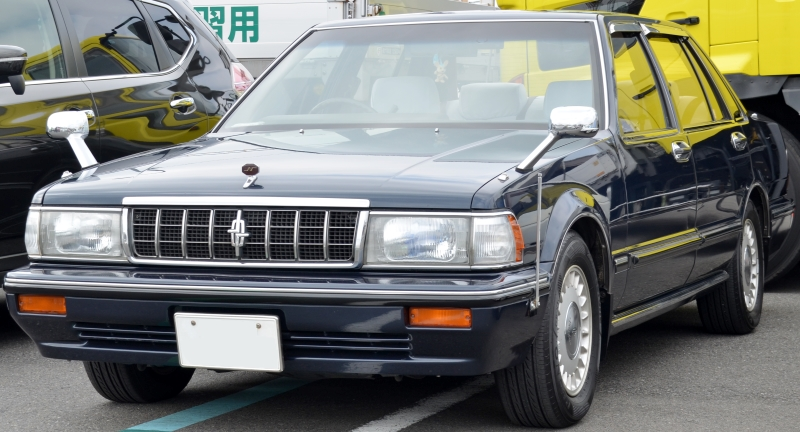
1989 Nissan Gloria V30E Brougham L sedan

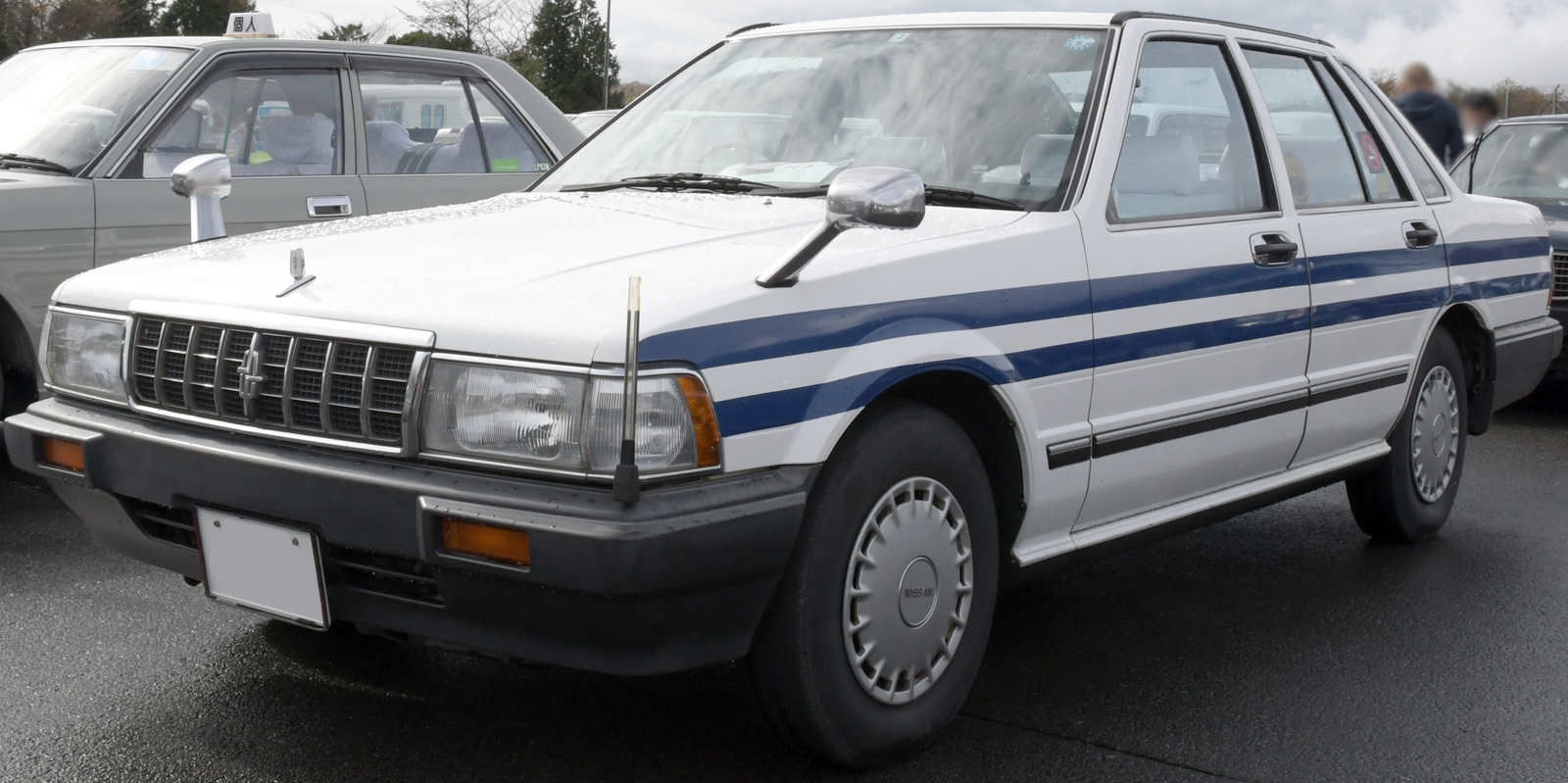
1989 Nissan Gloria V20E Super Custom sedan

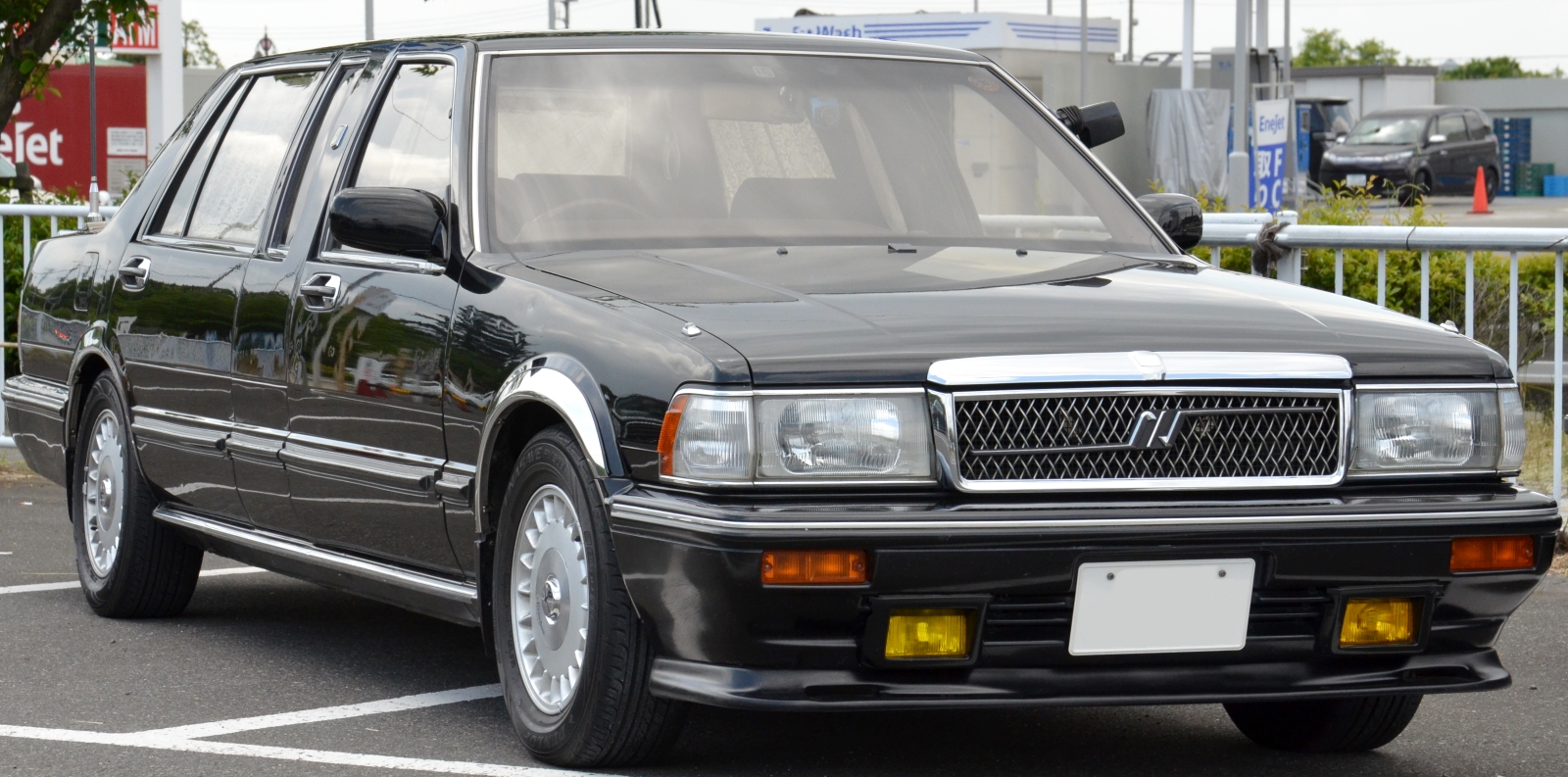
Nissan Gloria Autech Royal Limousine

== Ninth generation (Y32; 1991) ==
Most of the information in this article was translated from the Nissan Gloria article on Japanese Wikipedia at ja:日産・グロリア.

Nissan Gloria (Y32)
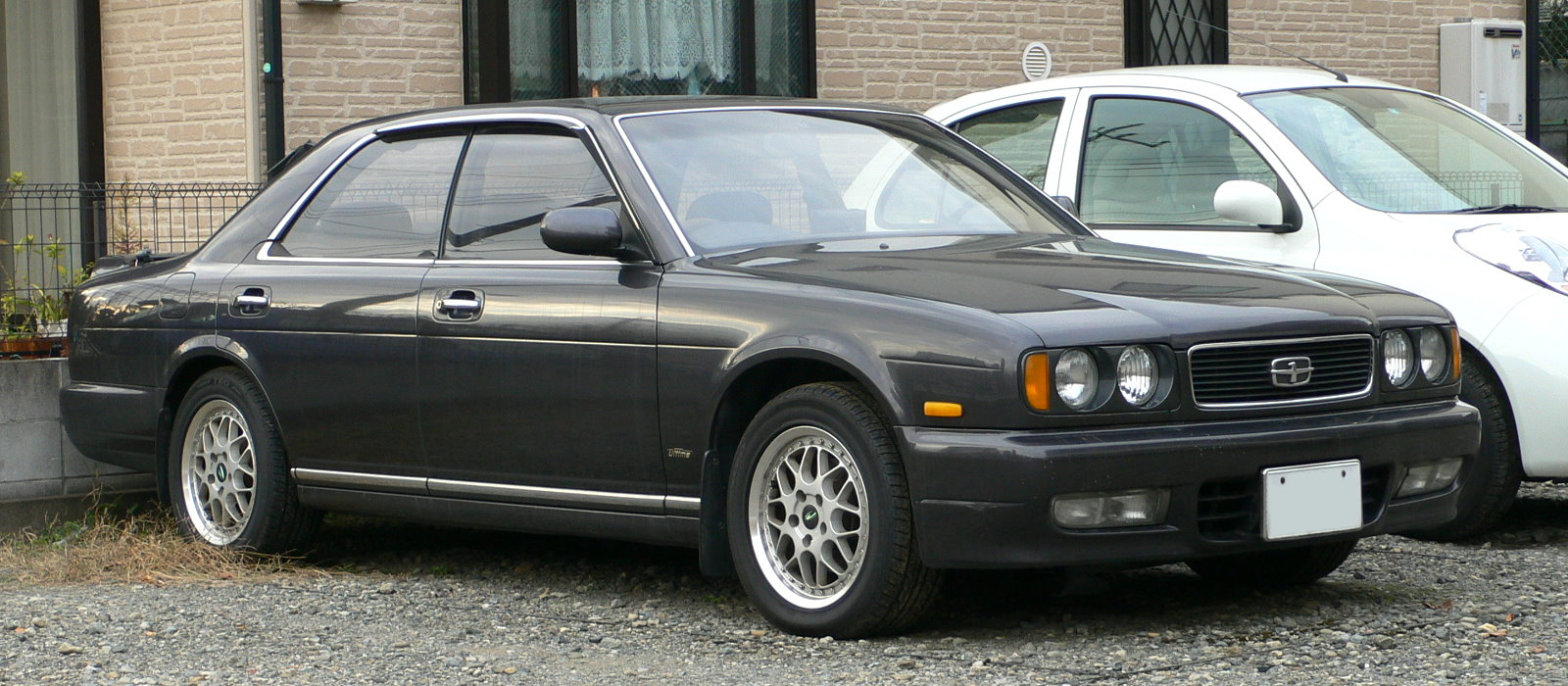
- 1991 Nissan Gloria V30 Twincam Turbo Gran Turismo Ultima

Overview
- Model code: Y32
- Also called: Nissan Cedric
- Production: 1991–1995
- Assembly: Japan: Musashimurayama

Body and chassis
- Body style: 4-door hardtop
- Layout: FR layout
- Related: Nissan Crew; Nissan Cima Y32; Nissan Leopard Y32

Powertrain
- Engine: 2.0 L VG20E V6; 3.0 L VG30E/VG30DE V6; 3.0 L VG30DET turbo V6; 2.8 L RD28 diesel I6
- Transmission: 4/5-speed automatic

Dimensions
- Wheelbase: 2,760 mm (108.7 in)
- Length: 4,780 mm (188.2 in)
- Width: 1,745 mm (68.7 in)
- Height: 1,390 mm (54.7 in)
- Curb weight: 1,660 kg (3,660 lb)

This generation was introduced June 1991, and was offered as a sedan; a centre "B" pillar was added to improve vehicle solidity, and improve crash worthiness, but is obscured behind side window glass and frameless side windows. The VG series engine continues to be offered with the 5-speed computer-controlled automatic transmission, with the 4-speed offered with the RD28 diesel engine. A manual transmission was no longer offered.

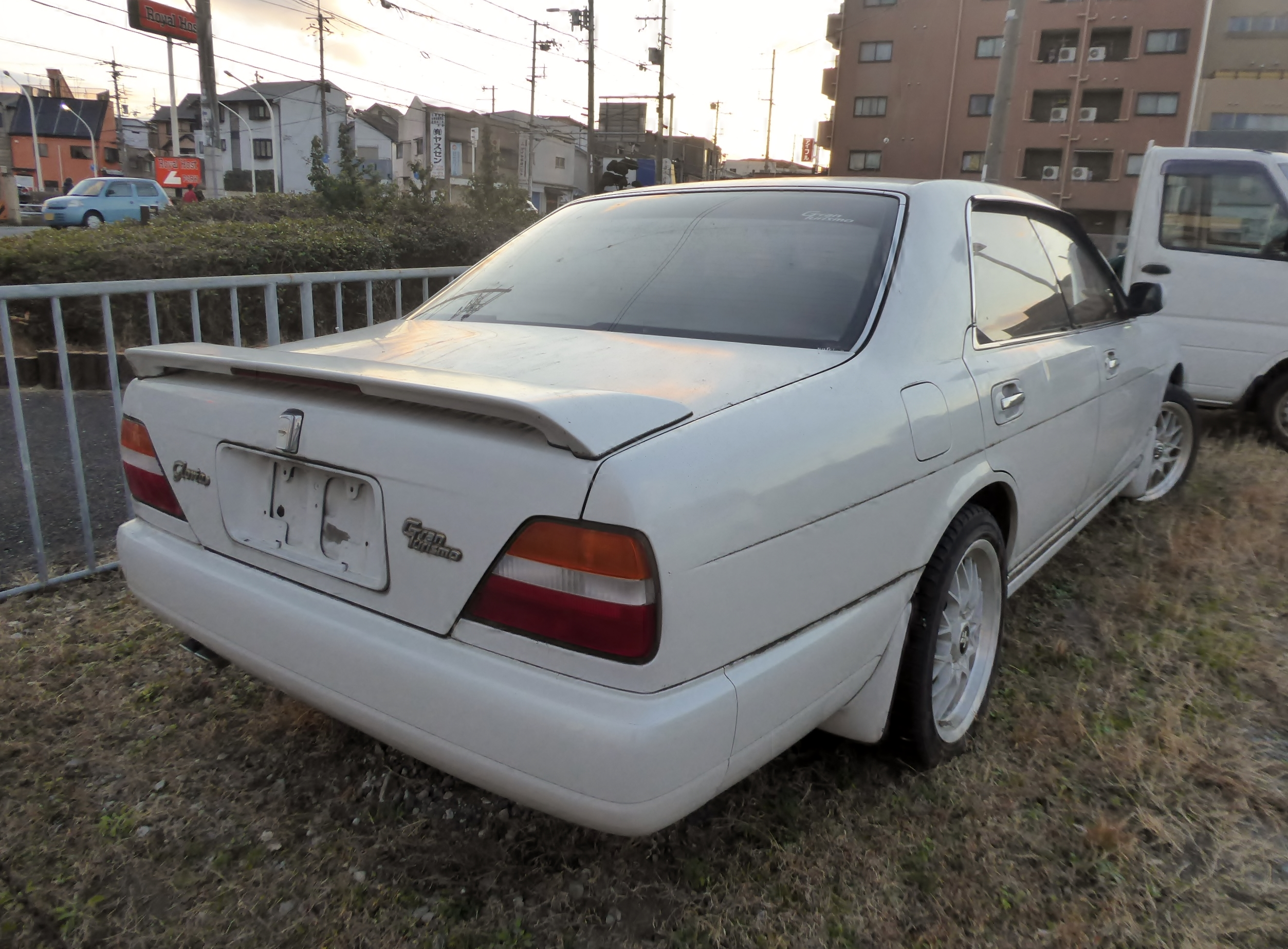
1993 Nissan Gloria V30E GranTurismo (PY32)

Trim levels offered were the Gran Turismo SV, Grand Turismo, and the top level vehicle is called the Gran Turismo ULTIMA. Other trim levels offered were the Brougham VIP type C, Brougham G, Brougham, Classic SV and the Classic.

By then, the popularity of the Nissan Cima affected sales of the Gloria, as sales were not as high as in past generations.

== Tenth generation (Y33; 1995) ==
Most of the information in this article was translated from the Nissan Gloria article on Japanese Wikipedia at ja:日産・グロリア.

Nissan Gloria (Y33)
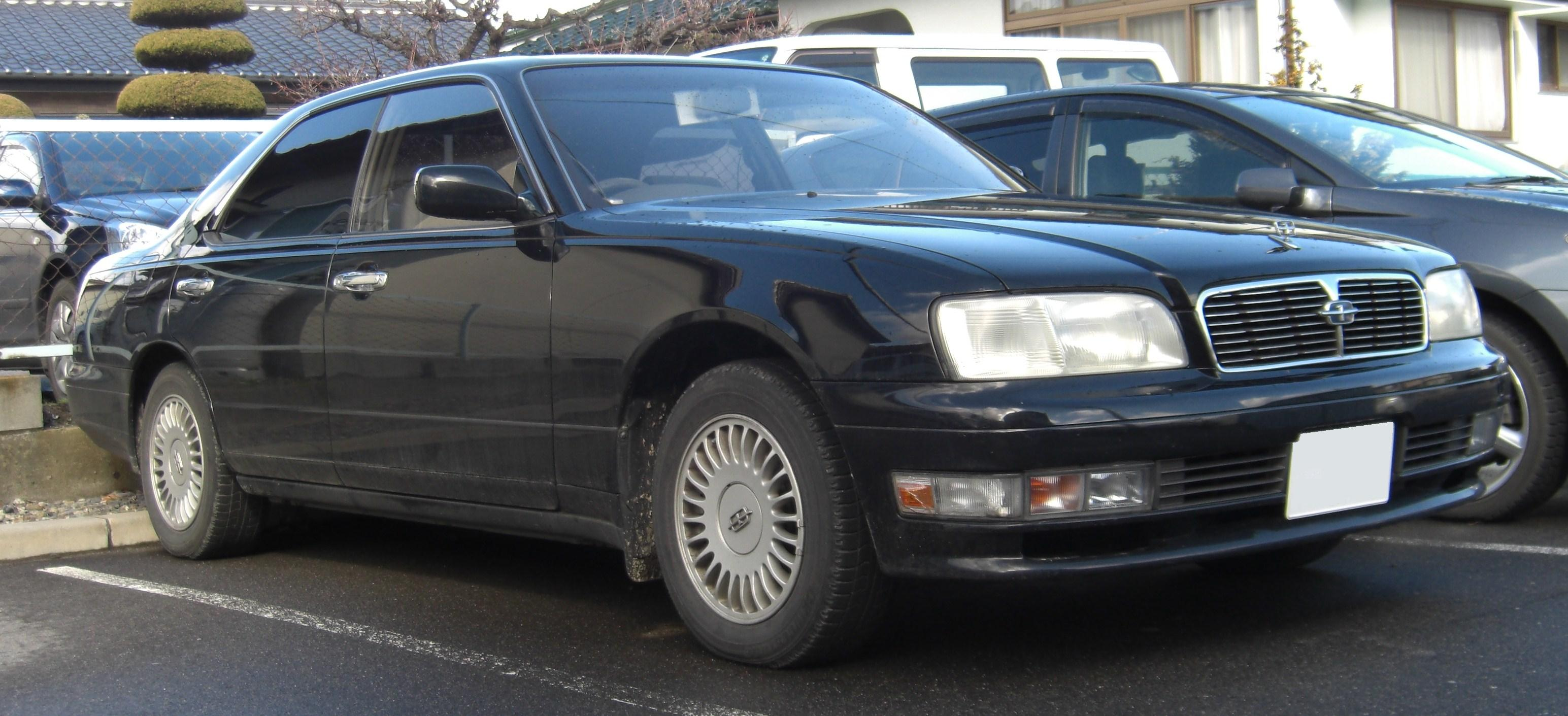
- 1995 Nissan Gloria V30 Twincam Turbo Brougham VIP

Overview
- Model code: Y33
- Also called: Nissan Cedric
- Production: 1995–1999
- Assembly: Japan: Musashimurayama

Body and chassis
- Body style: 4-door hardtop
- Layout: FR layout/AWD
- Related: Nissan Crew; Nissan Cima Y33; Nissan Leopard Y33

Powertrain
- Engine: 2.0 L VQ20DE V6; 2.5 L VQ25DE V6; 2.5 L RB25DET turbo I6; 3.0 L VQ30DE V6; 3.0 L VQ30DET turbo V6; 2.8 L RD28 diesel I6
- Transmission: 4/5-speed automatic

Dimensions
- Wheelbase: 2,800 mm (110.2 in)
- Length: 4,860 mm (191.3 in)
- Width: 1,765 mm (69.5 in)
- Height: 1,425 mm (56.1 in)
- Curb weight: 1,660 kg (3,660 lb)

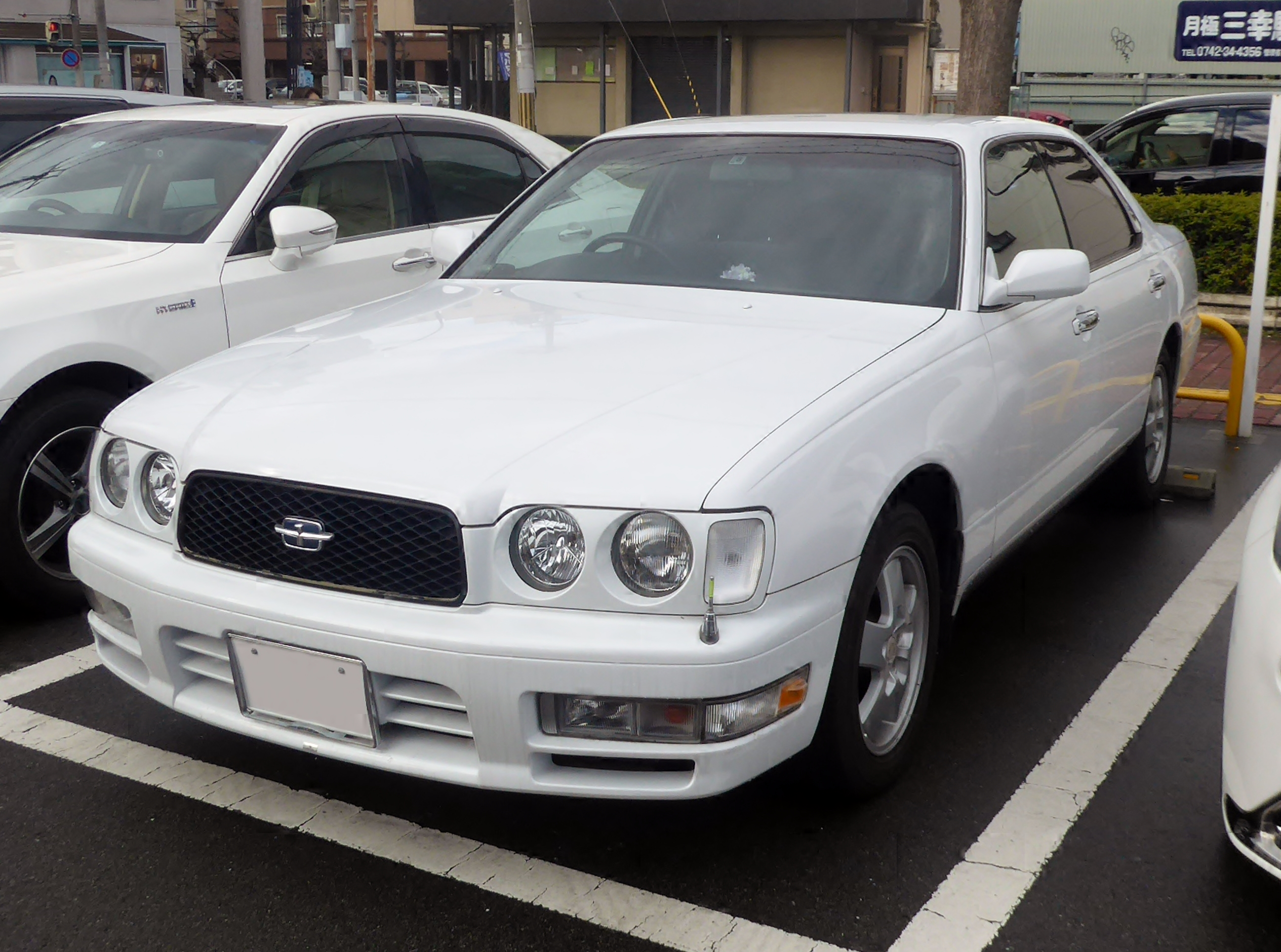
1995 Nissan Gloria Gran Turismo Ultima

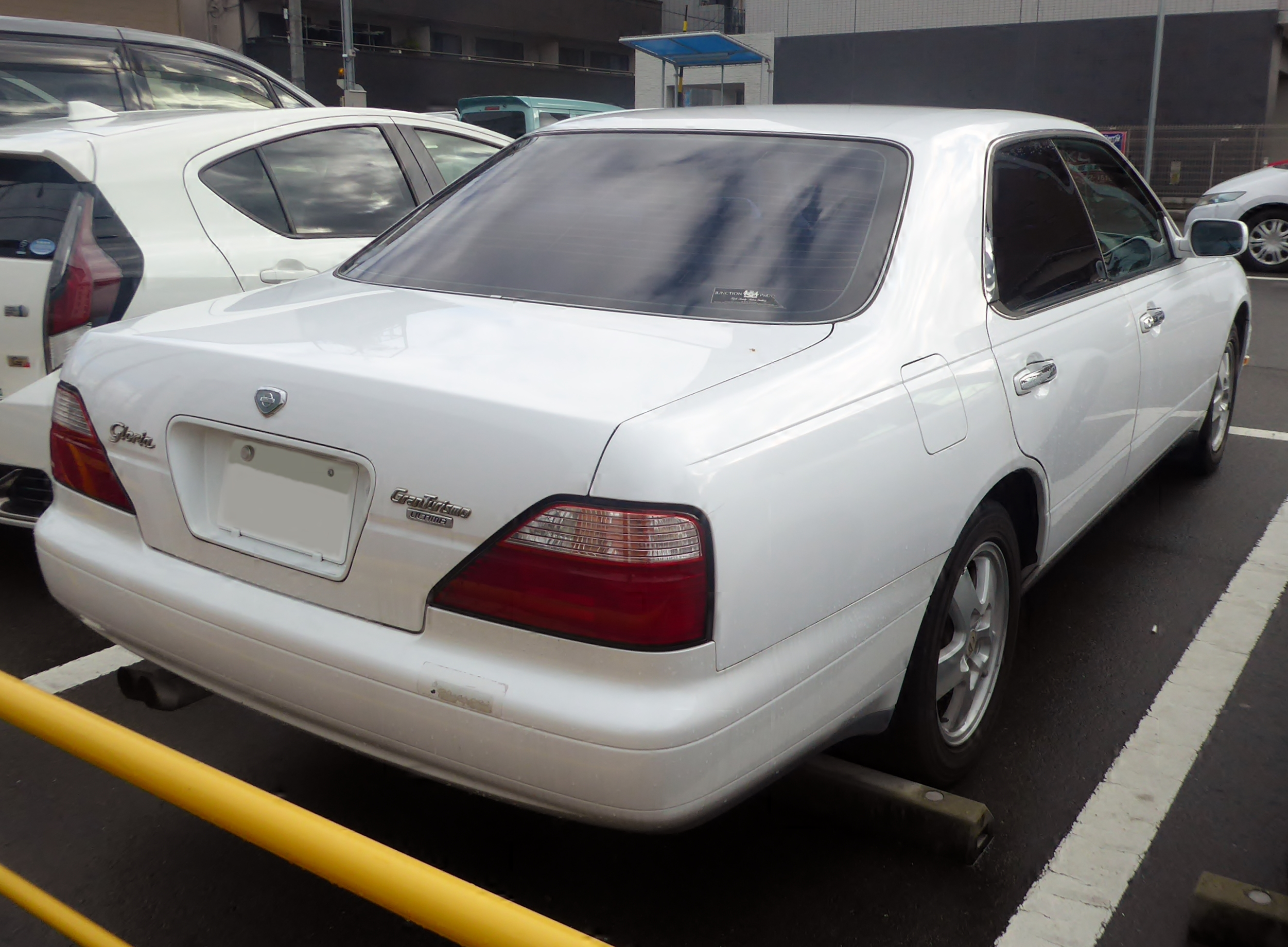
1995 Nissan Gloria Gran Turismo Ultima

The Y33 series Nissan Gloria received a full restyle on the existing platform; it was introduced in June 1995. Major changes were the introduction of the newly developed VQ series engine, replacing the VG series, with the top VQ30DET turbo utilizing an intercooler and DOHC valvetrain architecture. This was also the first Gloria to introduce optional four-wheel drive, only with the RB25DET engine and including Nissan's ATTESA E-TS system. The diesel RD28 was now only available with a 4-speed automatic transmission. Due to economic pressure, some of the trim levels are discontinued, leaving the Gran Turismo type X, Gran Turismo Ultima, Gran Turismo SV, Gran Turismo S, Gran Turismo, Brougham VIP, Brougham, and the Brougham J. The four-door sedan is no longer offered, leaving the four-door hardtop as the only bodystyle.

In the GCC market, the Gloria was introduced alongside the Infiniti Q45 in late 1996 for the 1997 model year, where both models were marketed and sold under the "Al Safwa Class" moniker. Two trims were available for the 1997 model, based on the Japanese market's Brougham J and Brougham VIP. From the 1998 model onwards, those two trims were replaced in favour of the Gran Turismo and Gran Turismo SV. All Gulf-spec Glorias came with a 3.0 litre VQ30DE V6. Sales ended after the year 2000 with no immediate successor.

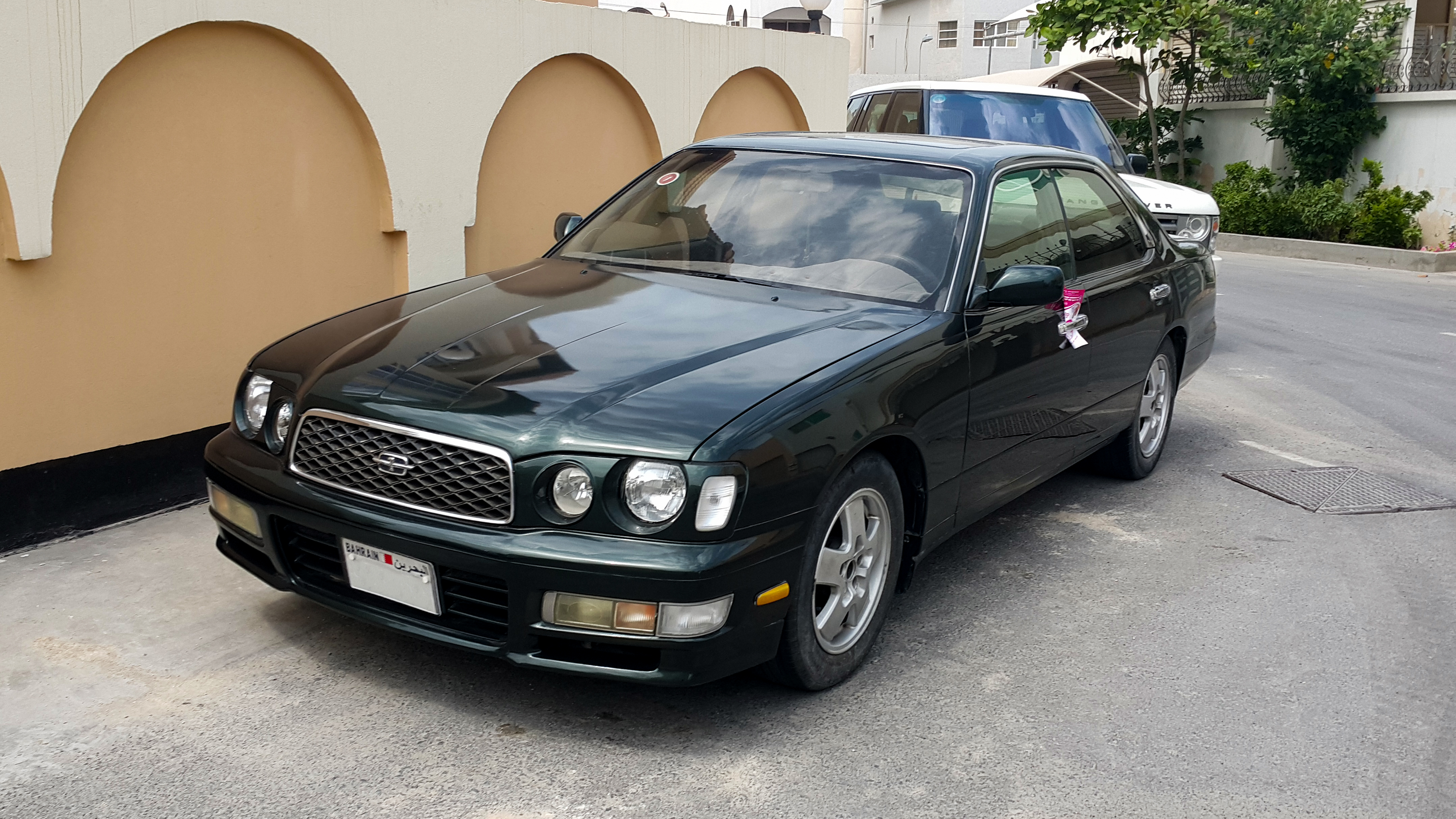
Nissan Gloria Gran Turismo Y33 (Bahrain)

== Eleventh generation (Y34; 1999) ==
Most of the information in this article was translated from the Nissan Gloria article on Japanese Wikipedia at ja:日産・グロリア.

Nissan Gloria (Y34)
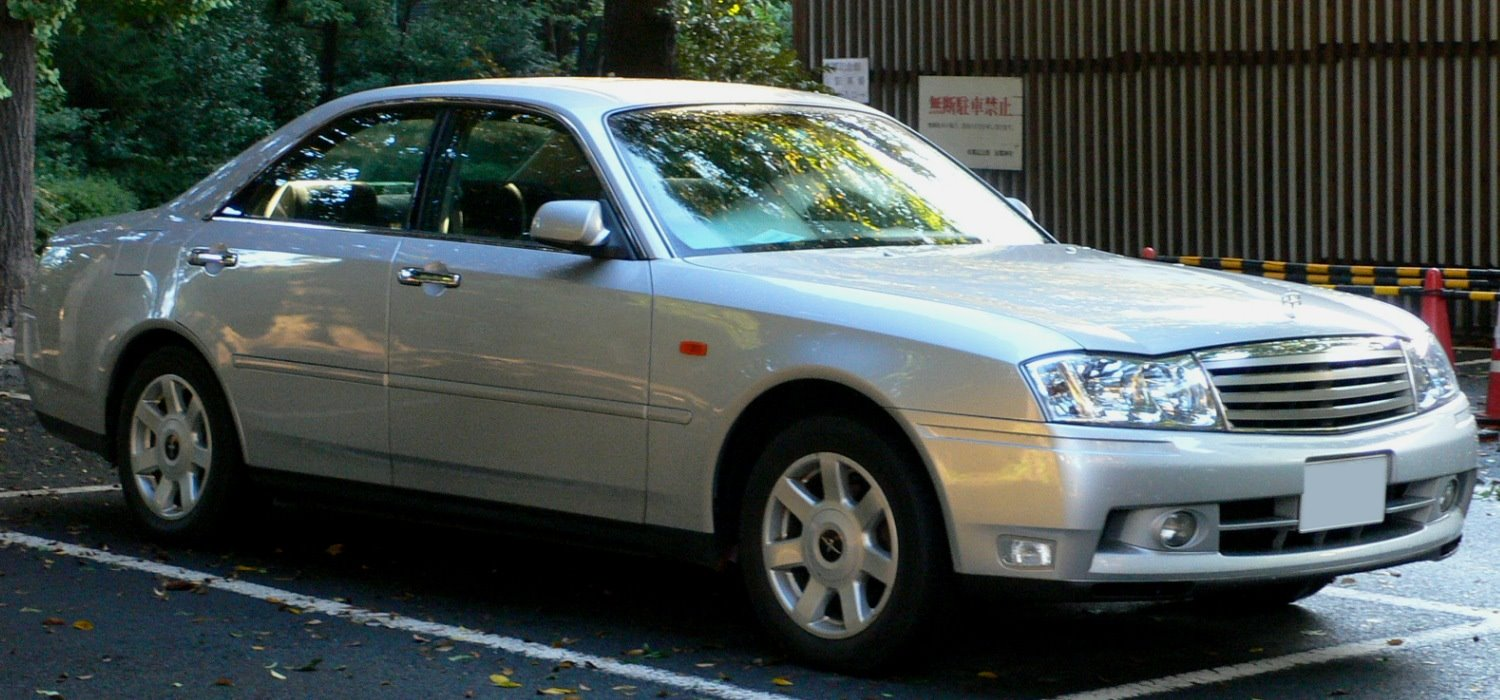
- 1999 Nissan Gloria (Y34)

Overview
- Model code: Y34
- Also called: Nissan Cedric; Infiniti M
- Production: 1999–2004
- Assembly: Japan: Musashimurayama

Body and chassis
- Body style: 4-door hardtop
- Layout: FR layout/AWD

Powertrain
- Engine: 2.5 L V6 VQ25DD LEV; 2.5 L I-6 RB25DET; 3.0 L V6 VQ30DD LEV; 3.0 L V6 VQ30DET LEV
- Transmission: CVT/4-speed automatic

Dimensions
- Wheelbase: 2,800 mm (110.2 in)
- Length: 4,860 mm (191.3 in)
- Width: 1,770 mm (69.7 in)
- Height: 1,440 mm (56.7 in)
- Curb weight: 1,710 kg (3,770 lb)

June 1999 saw the release of the final version of the Gloria, with design assistance from Porsche. Direct Injection is introduced on all engines with the "DD" designation. Four-wheel drive was again offered only on vehicles with the RB25DET engine. The top levels 300 ULTIMA-Z and the 300 ULTIMA-ZV were sold with CVT as the only transmission option.

January 7, 2000 saw Autech release a 40th anniversary edition of the Gloria.

=== End of production ===
Production of the Gloria ended after 46 years, and was replaced by the Nissan Fuga in October 2004.

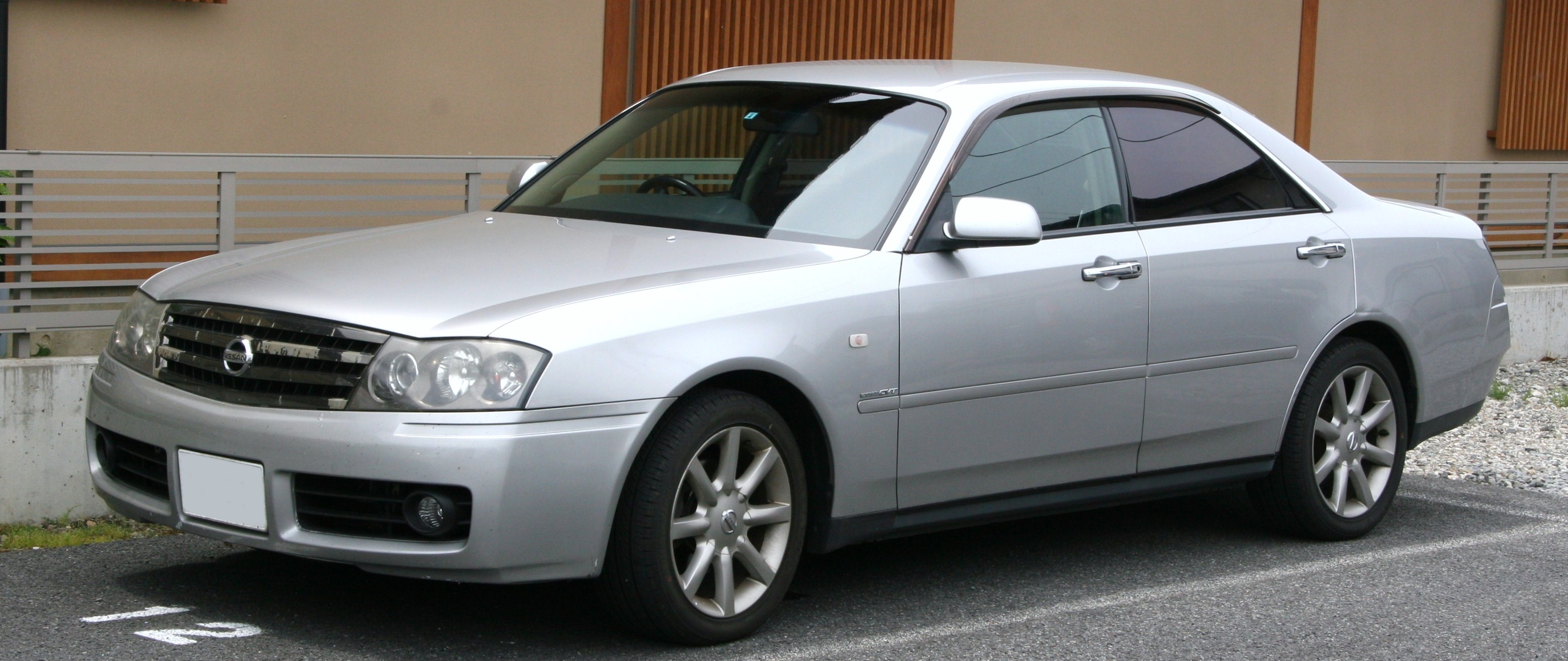
2001–2004 Nissan Gloria 250S Gran Turismo

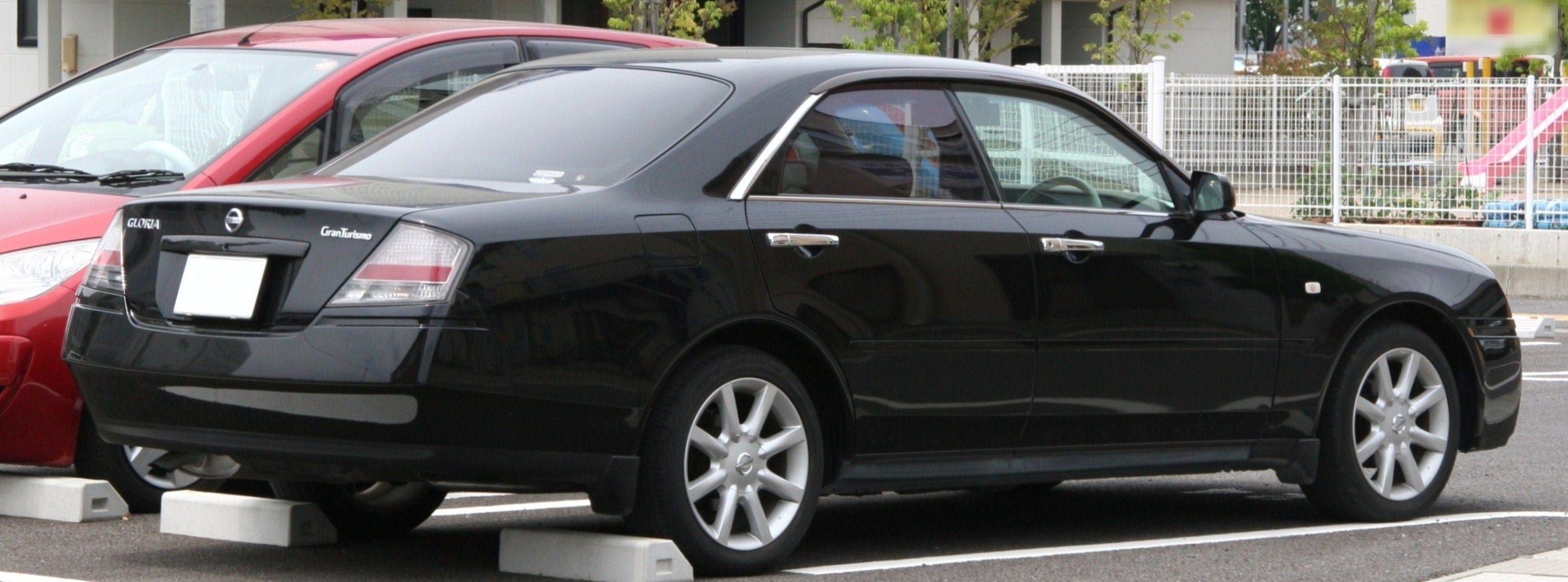
2001–2004 Nissan Gloria 250S Gran Turismo
