= Nissan RD engine =

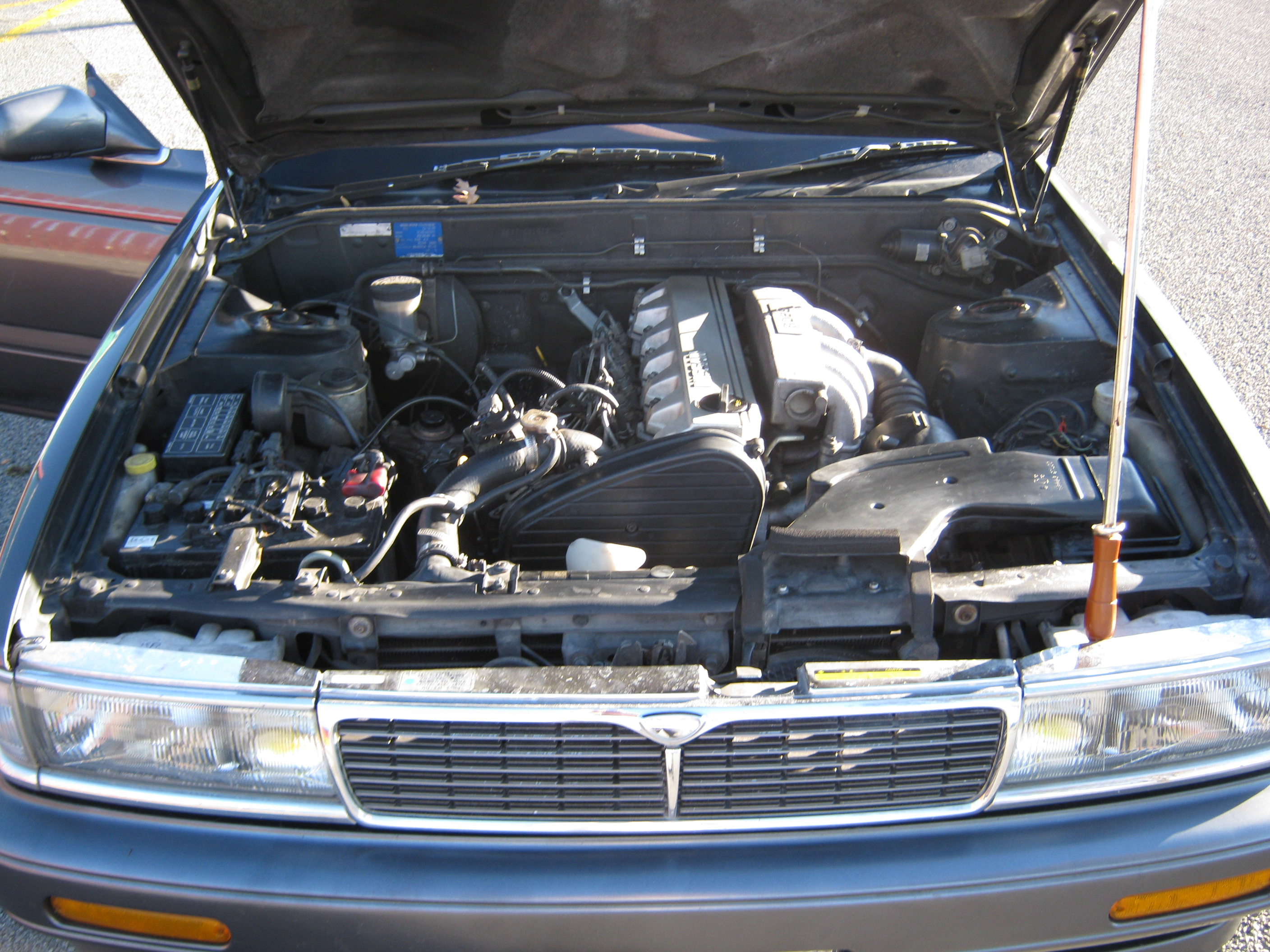
- RD28 series 1 in a C33 Nissan Laurel

Overview
- Manufacturer: Nissan Diesel
- Production: 1985-2009

Layout
- Configuration: Straight-6
- Displacement: 2.8 L (2,826 cc)
- Cylinder bore: 85 mm (3.35 in)
- Piston stroke: 83 mm (3.27 in)
- Valvetrain: SOHC, 2 valves per cylinder

Combustion
- Turbocharger: With intercooler (RD28T and RD28ET)
- Fuel system: Mechanical fuel injection; Electronic fuel injection
- Fuel type: Diesel
- Cooling system: Water-cooled

Output
- Power output: 94–145 PS (69–107 kW; 93–143 bhp)
- Torque output: 18–29.3 kg⋅m (177–287 N⋅m; 130–212 lb⋅ft)

Chronology
- Predecessor: Nissan L engine; Nissan SD engine

The Nissan RD engine series is the diesel version of the Nissan RB engine, using a single overhead cam, six-cylinder layout. It was the successor to the Nissan LD and SD six-cylinder engines and was joined by the six-cylinder Nissan TD engine.

From 1997 onwards, turbocharged versions were fitted with electronic fuel injection. The turbodiesel version is known as the RD28T (or RD28ET with electronic fuel injection) and were also fitted to the Nissan Safari (also known as the Nissan Patrol) off-road vehicle.

The engine block was similar to the RB30 engine except it had more material, was heavier and had an 85 mm bore vs the 86 mm bore of the RB30 and a 83 mm rather than 85 mm stroke. One issue is that the stronger vibrations from the diesel engine could loosen the crank/harmonic balancer bolt (originally from the RB) which in turn loosens or falls off, causing major engine damage. It is recommended to use thread locking fluid when installing.

The cylinder head was of a non-crossflow design, meaning that the exhaust and intake ports were on one side of the cylinder head.

== RD28 ==
- 2.8 L (2,826 cc) SOHC, 85 mm (3.35 in) bore

=== RD28 Series 1 ===
- 12 valves (two per cylinder). When originally introduced, JIS gross were used rather than JIS net, meaning that early information claims 100 PS (74 kW; 99 bhp) and 18.5 kg⋅m (181 N⋅m; 134 lb⋅ft) at the same engine speeds.
- 94 PS (69 kW; 93 bhp) at 4,800 rpm
- 18 kg⋅m (177 N⋅m; 130 lb⋅ft) at 2,400 rpm

Applications:

- 1985–1987 Nissan Skyline R31 series
- 1986–1993 Nissan Laurel C32, C33, & C34 series
- 1985–1993 Nissan Cedric / Nissan Gloria Y30, Y31, & Y32 series
- 1987–1999 Commercial (taxi) Nissan Cedric / Nissan Gloria Y31 series sedan
- 1993–1999 Nissan Crew K30 series
- 1988–1993 Nissan Cefiro A31 series

No PCV on the tappet cover.

=== RD28 Series 2 ===
- 100 PS (74 kW; 99 bhp) at 4,800 rpm
- 18.2 kg⋅m (178 N⋅m; 132 lb⋅ft) at 2,400 rpm

Applications:

- 1993–1999 Nissan Cedric / Nissan Gloria Y32 & Y33 series
- 1994–1999 Nissan Laurel C34 & C35 series

=== RD28E ===
- 100 PS (74 kW; 99 bhp) at 4,800 rpm
- 18.2 kg⋅m (178 N⋅m; 132 lb⋅ft) at 2,400 rpm

Applications:

- 1999-2002 Commercial (taxi) Nissan Cedric Y31 series sedan
- 1999–2001 Nissan Laurel C35 series
- 1999-2009 Nissan Crew K30 series

Vacuum pump located on tappet cover.

== RD28T ==
- 2.8 L (2,826 cc) SOHC turbodiesel
- 125 PS (92 kW; 123 bhp) at 4,400 rpm
- 26 kg⋅m (255 N⋅m; 188 lb⋅ft) at 2,400 rpm

Applications:

- 1996–1997 Nissan Safari Spirit series Y60 2-door soft-top
- Nissan Civilian

=== RD28ETi1 ===
- Electronically controlled turbodiesel with an intercooler
- 135 PS (99 kW; 133 bhp) at 4,000 rpm
- 29.3 kg⋅m (287 N⋅m; 212 lb⋅ft) at 2,000 rpm

Applications:

- 1997–1999 Nissan Safari (Y61) (automatic transmission)

=== RD28ETi2 ===
- Electronically controlled turbodiesel with an intercooler
- 145 PS (107 kW; 143 bhp) at 4,000 rpm
- 26.6 kg⋅m (261 N⋅m; 192 lb⋅ft) at 2,000 rpm

== See also ==
- List of Nissan engines
