= Nissan Crew =

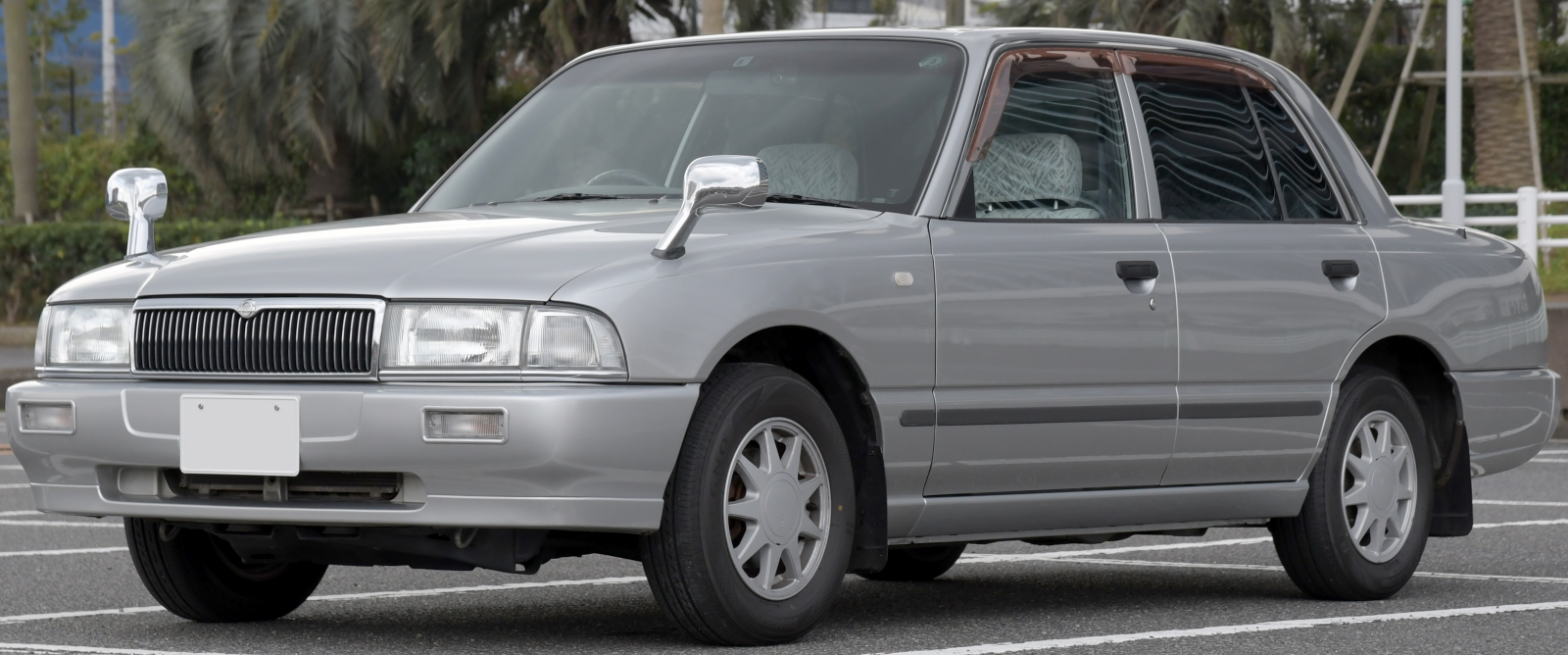
- Nissan Crew GLX

Overview
- Manufacturer: Nissan
- Production: July 1993–August 2009
- Assembly: Hiratsuka, Kanagawa (Nissan Shatai)

Body and chassis
- Class: Mid-size car
- Body style: 4-door sedan
- Layout: Front-engine, rear-wheel-drive
- Related: Nissan Cedric Y31; Nissan Gloria Y31

Powertrain
- Engine: 2.0 L NA20P LPG I4; 2.0 L RB20E I6; 2.8 L RD28/RD28E diesel I6
- Transmission: 4-speed automatic; 5-speed manual

Dimensions
- Wheelbase: 104.9 in (2,664 mm)
- Length: 180.9 in (4,595 mm)
- Width: 66.7 in (1,694 mm)
- Height: 57.5 in (1,460 mm)

Chronology
- Predecessor: Nissan Laurel (C32)
- Successor: Nissan Cedric Y31

The Nissan Crew is a mid-size sedan manufactured by Nissan between 1993 and 2009, sold only in Japan and mostly used as taxicabs, driver training, and by law enforcement agencies as police cars. Its FR layout and simple construction created a steady following converting Crews into drifting and tuning cars.

Its main competitor was the Toyota Comfort. An indication of its intended market as a taxi is that the b-pillar is set 5 cm (2 in) further forward on the passenger (left) side, making the driver's side door and the left rear door larger than the others since these two would see the majority of use. The rear left door was also available with power opening.

== History ==
Production of the Nissan Crew (K30) started at Nissan Shatai in July 1993. While the majority of Crews were used as taxis, a civilian model was available between 1994 and 2002 known as "Crew Saloon". The Crew used a body pan derived from the Y31 Nissan Cedric, although the front end was mostly borrowed from the C32 Laurel. The Crew Saloon, aimed at private buyers (but still available with a power rear door) was built between January 1994 and June 2002. The Crew taxi was built until August 2009, with a total of 52,124 cars sold.

Autech has been involved in modifying Crews for paratransit taxi (福祉タクシー) models where the front passenger seat may rotate to allow a disabled passenger to sit in front.

== Models ==
In addition to taxi models, there were also special paratransit models, driving school models, patrol cars, and other specialty vehicles available.

The typical engine was the LPG-powered NA20P, but the RD28 diesel was also available (E-L and GLX). Police and driver training cars were also offered with the RB20E engine. Equipment levels started with the very spartan E, followed by the E-L, GL, and GLX. While the E and E-L were mostly sold to taxi companies, the GL and GLX targeted owner-operators. As such, they were available with body-colored bumpers, chrome trim, aluminium wheels and other comfort and appearance items.

=== Saloon ===
Introduced in January 1994, the Crew Saloon was aimed at private buyers rather than institutional and commercial use. The range consisted of the LS Saloon-F, LS Saloon, LX Saloon and the more expensive LX Saloon G Type. At the time of introduction, there was also a somewhat lower cost B Type model of the LX Saloon, but this was discontinued in February 1995 when the G Type was introduced. Most Crew Saloons were equipped with the 2-liter six-cylinder RB20E engine, but the RD28 diesel was also available (only on the LX Saloon and the later LX Saloon G Type). Sales targets at the time of introduction were 300 per month of the gasoline model, and 50 per month for the diesels; this had dropped to 200 per month of all models by 1995 and to 100 per month by 1998. In August 1999, the LS models were dropped from the lineup.

=== Galue I ===
The Crew forms the basis for the Galue sedan by Mitsuoka, produced from 1996 to 2001. It shares the same RB20E engine and the design was inspired by the Rolls-Royce Silver Cloud II. It was originally sold simply as the Galue, but after the introduction of the Cedric-based Galue II in 1999 the original model became the Galue I to help keep them apart.

== Specifications ==
=== Engines ===
The initial Crew lineup of July 1993 consisted of Taxi and Driver Training cars with the LPG-powered, four-cylinder, 2-liter NA20P engine or the six-cylinder, diesel RD28 with 94 PS (69 kW). The NA20P produces 82 PS (60 kW) in the initial specifications; in June 1998 it received a new catalyst and redesigned combustion chambers, cutting NO_{X} emissions, improving fuel economy, and bumping power to 85 PS (63 kW). In August 1999, the diesel engine was upgraded to the 18-valve, electronically controlled RD28E unit with 100 PS (74 kW) but it was no longer offered on the GLX model. In April 1994, three months after the introduction of the RB20E in the Crew Saloon, this engine was also installed in the patrol car (a six-cylinder engine was generally required for patrol cars) and then to the driving school cars. In June 2002, the gasoline and diesel options were discontinued, leaving only the LPG-powered NA20P and marking the end of the patrol car as well as the Crew Saloon.

The Crew Saloon was offered with the RB20E inline-six with 130 PS (96 kW) and a 2.8 litre RD28 inline-six diesel engine. It's mated to either a 4-speed automatic transmission or a 5-speed manual transmission. Introduced in January 1994, only the RB20E was on offer at first. In May 1994, the diesel engine became available, initially only on the LX Saloon model. The diesel engine produces the same power in the Saloon as in the commercial models, and was also upgraded to the RD28E in August 1999. The Crew Saloon was discontinued in June 2002.

== Gallery ==
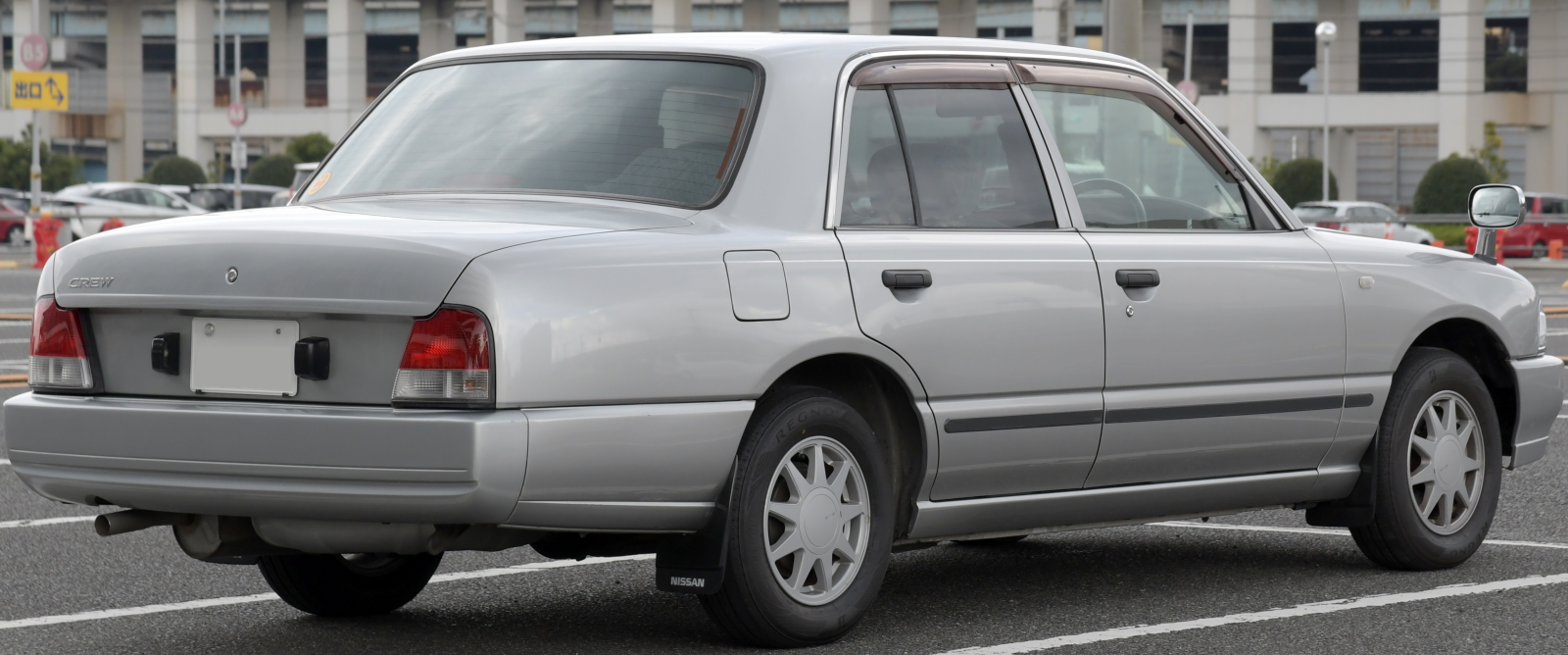
Nissan Crew GLX

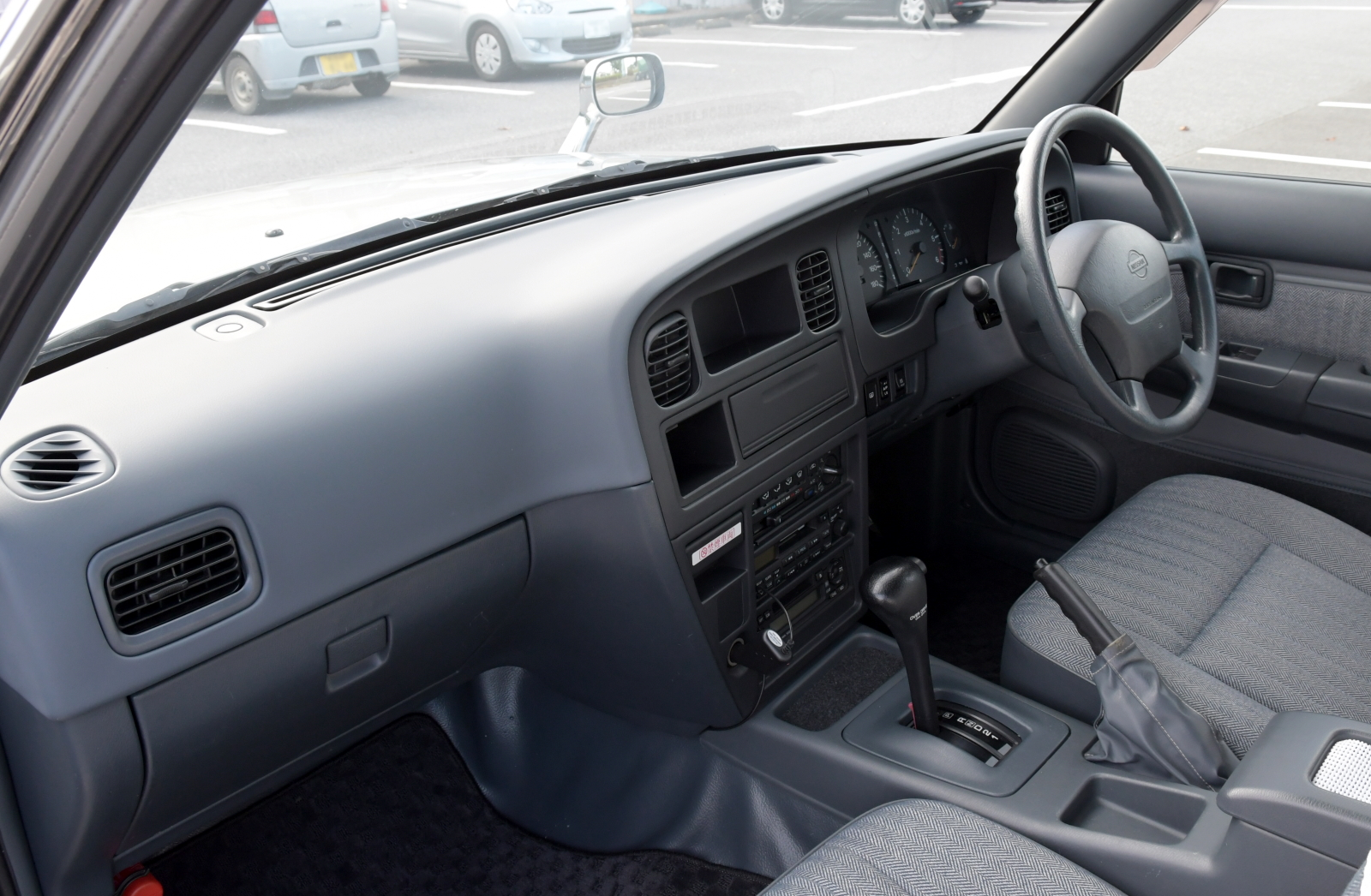
Nissan Crew GLX interior

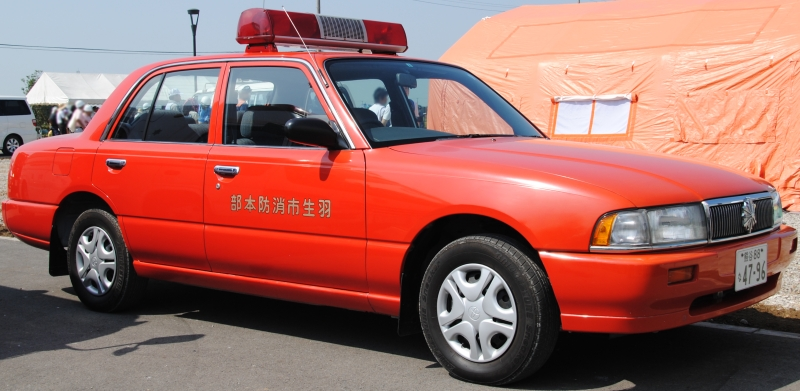
Nissan Crew used by a fire department

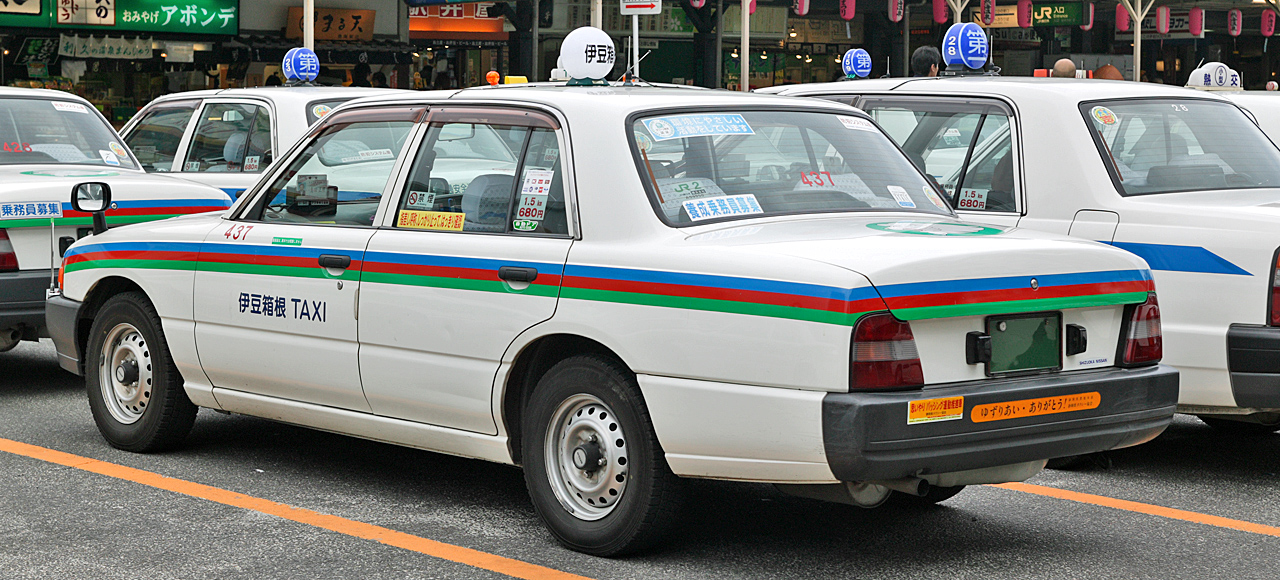
Nissan Crew taxi
