= Nissan Laurel =

Series of luxury performance automobiles manufactured by Nissan

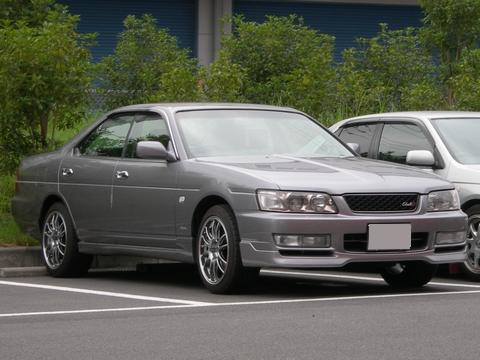
- Nissan Laurel Club S (C35)

Overview
- Manufacturer: Nissan
- Production: 1968–2002

Body and chassis
- Class: Mid-size car

Chronology
- Successor: Nissan Teana

The Nissan Laurel (Japanese: 日産・ローレル, Hepburn: Nissan Rōreru) is a two- and four-door sedan manufactured and marketed by Nissan from 1968 to 2002. Later generations added all-wheel drive and turbocharged engines. Introduced in 1968 as a new model positioned above the Datsun Bluebird 510, the Laurel offered the luxury of the Nissan Gloria A30 in a shorter wheelbase, and always was the luxury version of the Skyline range for all generations, sharing engines, suspensions, and handling dynamics of the popular performance coupe and sedan while having a longer wheelbase.

The first Laurel was developed by the Nissan Tsurumi R&D Division and assembled at the Musashimurayama Plant of the former Prince Motor Company in 2-door and 4-door variants beginning in 1968. The Laurel was not marketed new in Japan at Nissan Prince Store locations that sold the Skyline and Gloria, former Prince products. Instead, the Laurel was sold at Nissan Motor Store as the junior model to the Nissan Cedric and executive limousine, V8-powered Nissan President.

The Laurel, and its Skyline twin, saw yearly equipment, appearance and trim package changes, so as to appear fresh and new, and every four to five years were given an all-new appearance, while core technology that were tested and reliable remained underneath.

Nissan intermittently listed the Laurel for sale in various Asian, European and South American markets, labeled as the Datsun Laurel or Datsun 200L until exports from Japan ended after 1989. The Laurel was cancelled subsequent to Nissan's alliance with Renault.

The name "laurel" is in reference to a laurel wreath, a symbol of triumph worn as a chaplet around the head, or as a garland around the neck.

== First generation (C30; 1968) ==
Nissan Laurel
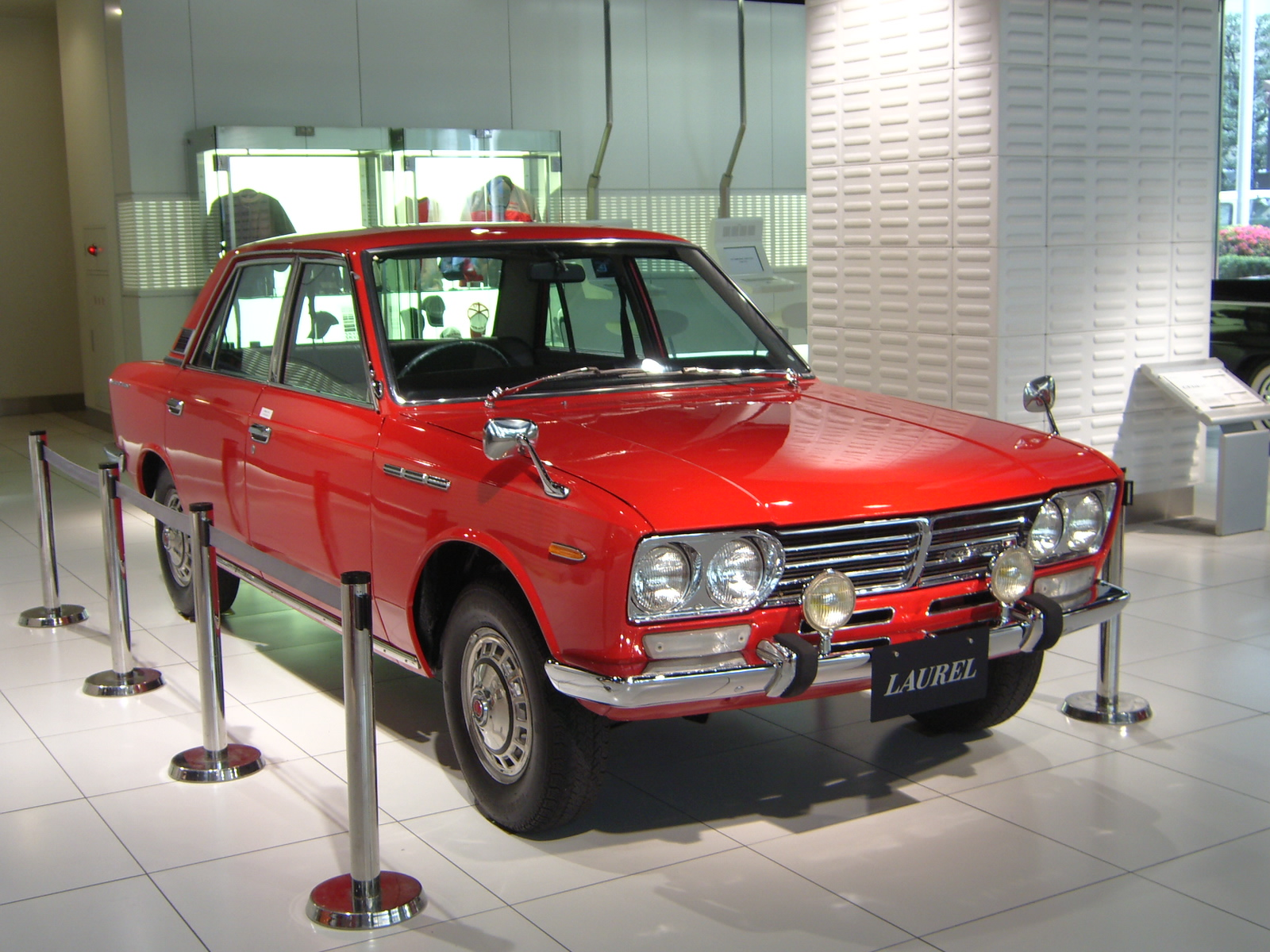
- Nissan Laurel

Overview
- Model code: C30
- Also called: Datsun Laurel; Datsun 200L; Datsun 1800
- Production: 1968–1972
- Assembly: Musashimurayama, Japan
- Designer: Shinichiro Sakurai

Body and chassis
- Body style: 2-door hardtop coupé; 4-door sedan
- Layout: front engine/rear drive
- Related: Nissan Skyline C10

Powertrain
- Engine: 1.8 L G-18 I4; 2.0 L G-20 I4
- Transmission: 4-speed manual; 5-speed manual; 3-speed automatic

Dimensions
- Wheelbase: 2,620 mm (103.1 in)
- Length: 4,305 mm (169.5 in)
- Width: 1,605 mm (63.2 in)
- Height: 1,405 mm (55.3 in)
- Curb weight: 1,005 kg (2,215.6 lb)

In April 1968, Nissan presented its new Laurel in four-door deLuxe and Super deLuxe versions, both equipped with a 1.8 L inline-four engine, and in June 1970 a two-door hardtop coupé joined the lineup. The Laurel was conceived as a junior version of the all-new Gloria before Nissan acquired Prince, and one year later a 2000 cc engine became available in the four-door sedan as well. The focus on a luxurious appearance had appeared in 1962 with the Nissan Skyline Sport with an exotic, European influenced appearance. Its competitors at introduction were the 1968 Toyota Corona Mark II sedan, and the Mazda Luce which was introduced in 1966.

The Laurel did not sell as well as expected, largely because the design was too similar to that of the smaller, modestly priced Bluebird (510) which was developed as a competitor before Nissan bought Prince. The Bluebird was exclusive to Nissan Store, so as not to compete alongside the higher-content luxury Laurel.

This car was developed by the Nissan Tsurumi vehicle development team, but the C30 Laurel was fitted with the Prince four-cylinder SOHC engine, the G18 of 1,815 cc capacity. Conversely, the GC10 Skyline 2000GT was developed by the former Prince Ogikubo vehicle development team but was fitted with Nissan's L20 six-cylinder SOHC engine. The suspension is the same MacPherson struts for all wheels and Semi-trailing arm independent suspension for the rear wheels that was fitted on the C10 Skyline. August 1970 saw the release of a modified version of the four-door sedan version, now with the same roof angle as that of the hard top. The instrument panel received redesigned panel meters, and the more luxurious GL grade was added.

=== 2000GX ===
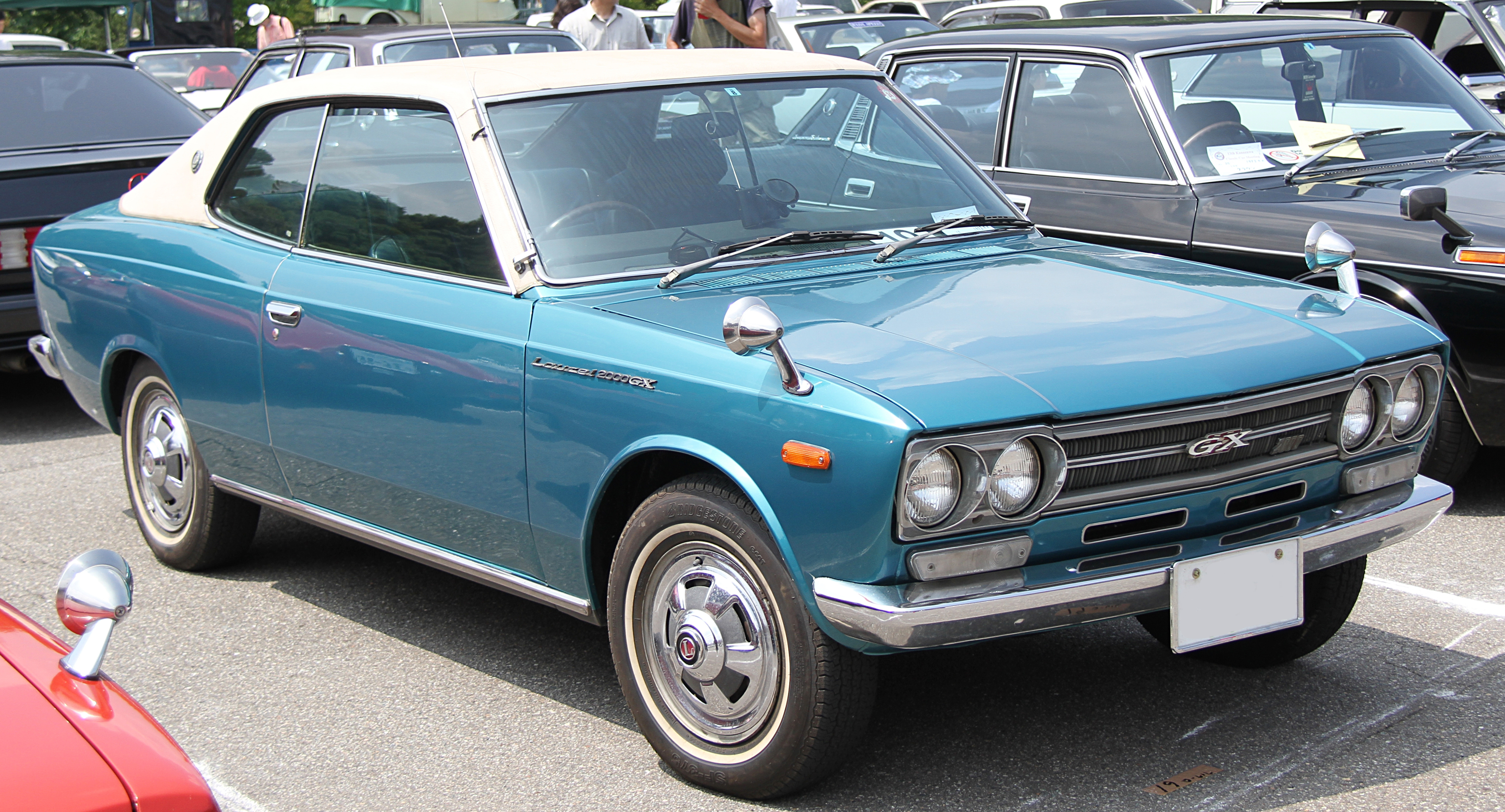
1972 Nissan Laurel 2000GX coupe

The Laurel 2000GX, Nissan's first hardtop, was introduced June 1970 and was equipped with the Prince developed SOHC 1,990 cc G20-series four-cylinders with either a single or SU twin-carburetor. The single carburetor generated 110 PS (81 kW; 108 hp) at 5600RPM, the dual carburetor generated 120 PS (88 kW; 118 hp) at 5800rpm, and the premium fuel dual carburetor generated 125 PS (92 kW; 123 hp) at 5800rpm. The Laurel hardtop coupe was introduced before the SOHC Skyline 2000 GT-X with the L20SU straight-six engine that appeared later in October. The Laurel 2000GX used the same chassis as the Skyline GT-X and GT-R while having a longer wheelbase. The Skyline GT-R garnered most of the attention, having been raced and built for that purpose, while the 2000GX was developed for comfortable yet spirited performance. The Laurel 2000GX used the same 5-speed manual transmission, an available limited slip differential, and also used semi-trailing arm strut suspension, with disc brakes at the front and drum brakes at the rear. A feature that was unique to the 2000GX was the stylish at the time sequential rear turn signals, where three light blubs would flash from the center to the outer edge on both the coupe and sedan. All Laurel coupes were also given a vinyl roof as standard equipment.

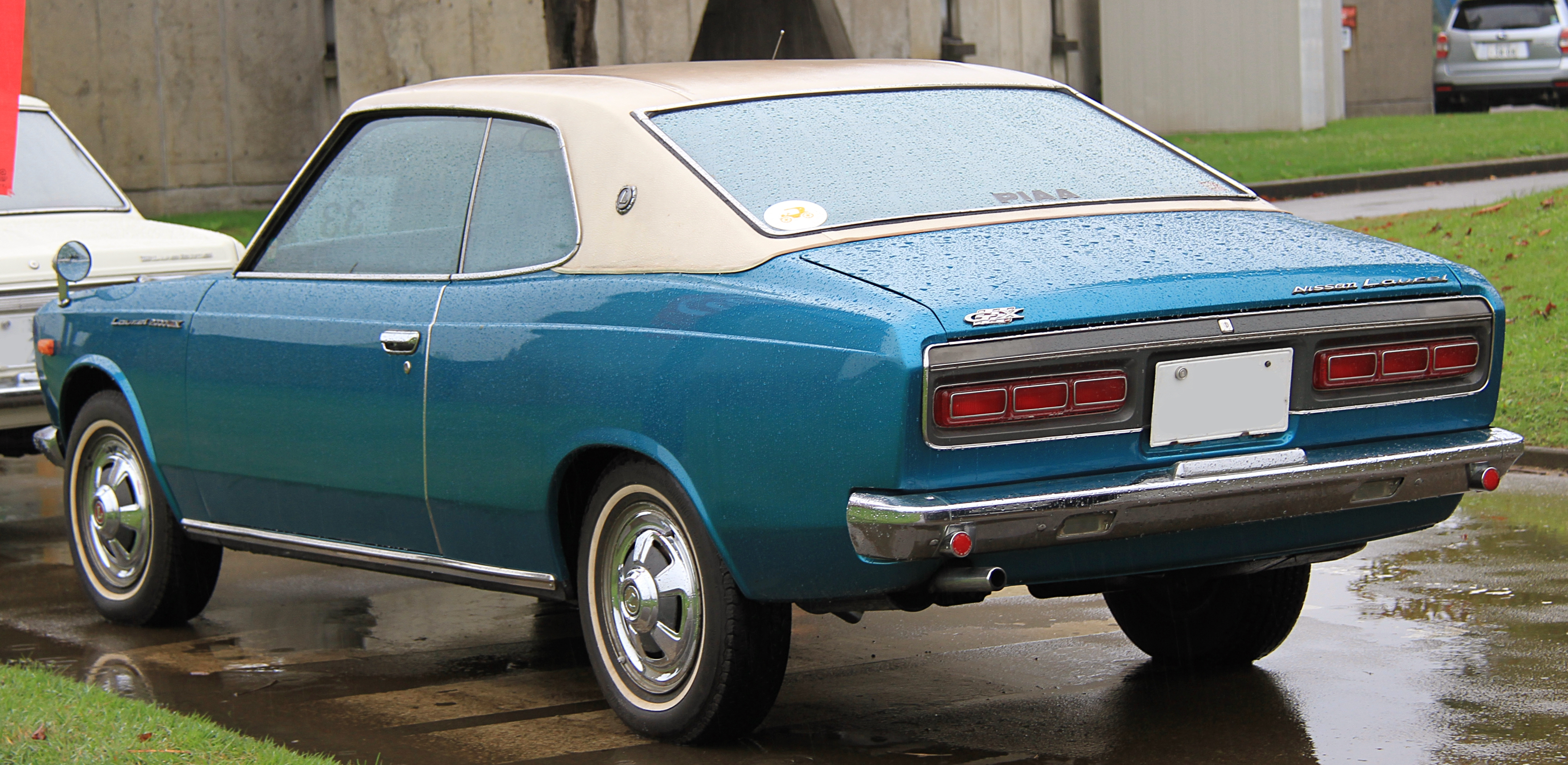
1972 Nissan Laurel 2000GX coupe

== Second generation (C130; 1972) ==
Nissan Laurel
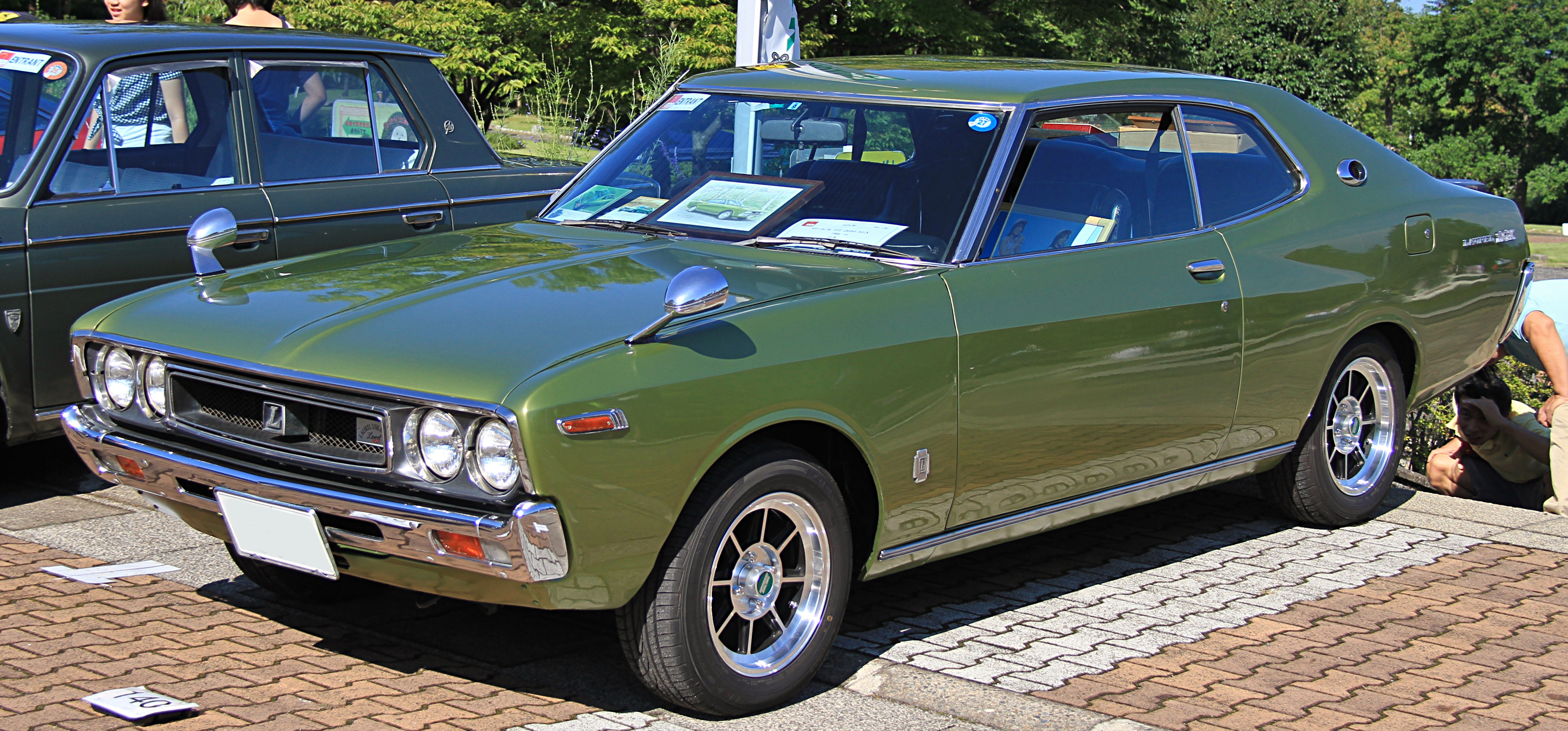
- Nissan Laurel 2000SGX series C130

Overview
- Model code: C130
- Also called: Datsun Laurel; Datsun 200L
- Production: 1972–1977
- Assembly: Musashimurayama, Japan
- Designer: Shinichiro Sakurai

Body and chassis
- Body style: 2-door hardtop coupé 4-door sedan
- Layout: front engine/rear drive
- Related: Nissan Skyline C110

Powertrain
- Engine: 1770 cc L18 I4; 1815 cc G18 I4; 1990 cc G20 I4; 1998 cc L20A I6; 2565 cc L26 I6; 2753 cc L28 I6; Induction motor (EV)
- Transmission: 4/5-speed manual 3-speed automatic

Dimensions
- Wheelbase: 2,670 mm (105.1 in)
- Length: 4,500 mm (177.2 in)
- Width: 1,670 mm (65.7 in)
- Height: 1,415 mm (55.7 in)
- Curb weight: 1,155 kg (2,546.3 lb); 1,919 kg (4,231 lb) (EV)

In April 1972, the second Laurel generation appeared, again in four-door saloon and two-door hardtop coupé form affectionately known as the Butaketsu Laurel ("pig butt") because of its ample rear quarter panels and tail section, with the taillights incorporated into the rear bumper. The saloon continued to use MacPherson struts for the front wheels but now used a rear beam axle and semi-elliptic leaf spring.

The hardtop coupé continued to share MacPherson struts for the front wheels and Semi-trailing arm for the rear suspension, and again shared with the Skyline 2000 GTX-E. The styling of the coupe appears to be influenced by the 1970 Ford Torino and the 1971 Mercury Cougar, reflecting a popular styling trend during the 1960s and 1970s called "coke bottle", and continued a softer appearance in comparison to the edgier Skyline.

The G-20 4-cylinder and L20 six-cylinder engines were equipped with SU twin carburetors but were eliminated in February 1976 due to emission regulations. Engines available at the time were the four-cylinder 1815 cc G18 and 1990 cc G20, and the six-cylinder 1998 cc L20. Both the G20 and L20 were available with twin SU carburetors as an option. However, only the G20 equipped cars outwardly announced this with a "Twin Carburetor 2000GX" badge.

Sales in Japan (very few were exported) ran to about 96,000 per year, with three-quarters sedans. The Toyota competitor was the Mark II coupé and sedan.

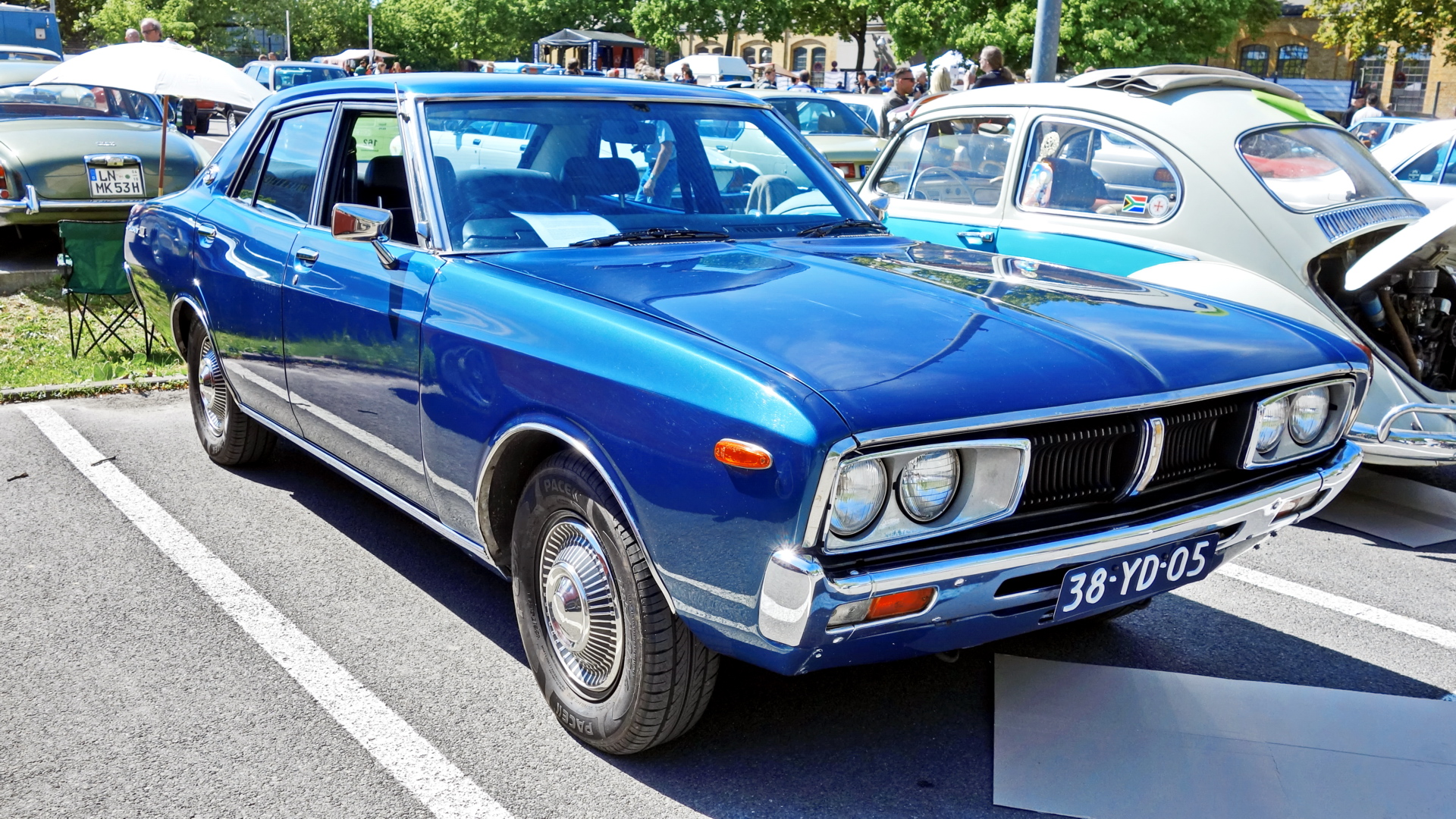
Datsun 200L sedan (Europe)

In October 1973 the first Laurel with the 2565 cc L26 six-cylinder engine was added and badged as "2600SGL". Since the engine was over two litres, it was not restrained by the size limits imposed by Japanese regulations, and therefore it was fitted with bigger bumpers than regular Laurels. The installation of the 2.6-litre engine in Japanese models helped identify this generation as a luxury car, as the larger engine obligated Japanese drivers to pay higher amounts of annual road tax.

In September 1975, in order to meet the new emissions regulations for that year, the L26 was replaced by the larger yet 2753 cc L28 six-cylinder. By October the carburettors in the L20 were replaced with electronic fuel injection and the engine was now dubbed L20E. Because of the difficulty in meeting the emissions regulations, the twin-carburetted engines were all discontinued. The 1,770 cc L18 replaced the G18 in the lineup.

In February 1976 carburetted 1.8-litre and 2.0-litre engines which met the 1976 emissions regulations were introduced, and were identified with the Nissan NAPS badge.

This model has been nicknamed as "Gamera Laurel" (Japanese: ガメラ・ローレル, Hepburn: Gamera Rōreru), "Butaketsu" (Japanese: ブタケツ, Hepburn: Butaketsu), and "Kan-Oke" (Japanese: 棺桶, Hepburn: Kanoke) for its design to evoke Gamera the turtle kaiju, the gluteal region of pigs, and coffins.

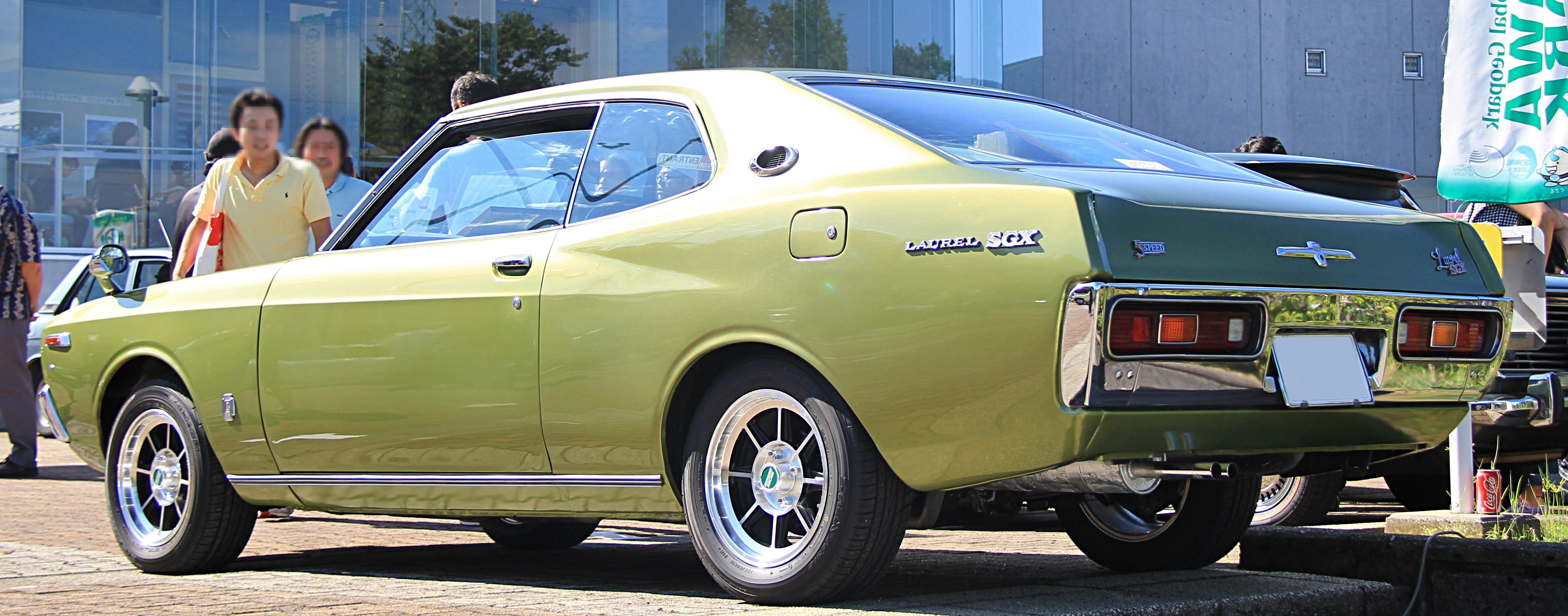
Nissan Laurel 2000SGX Hardtop (C130) with Hayashi Street wheels

=== Laurel C130-EV ===
In 1974 Nissan developed an electric passenger sedan based on the Nissan Laurel. The Nissan Laurel C130-EV - referred to as the Datsun 200L-EV in export markets - developed to be used by the VIPs at the 1975 International Oceanographic Exposition in Okinawa. It was originally engineered by the Prince Motor Company, but produced by Nissan when the company assumed Prince operations in 1966.

The C130-EV uses one 16.0 kW (21.5 hp) electric motor, rear-mounted and driving the rear axle through a two-speed automatic transmission. The Nissan Laurel C130-EV has a claimed top speed of 85 km/h (53 mph) and a range of 65 km (40 mi). Nissan's next electric car venture would be the 1998 Altra.

== Third generation (C230; 1977) ==
Nissan Laurel
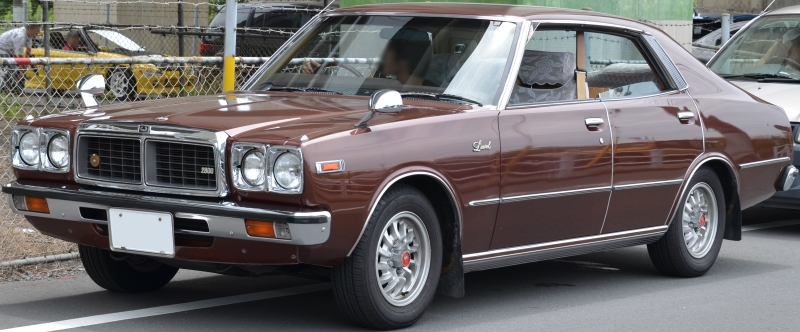
- Nissan Laurel 2800 SGL Hardtop

Overview
- Model code: C230
- Also called: Datsun Laurel; Datsun 180L/200L/240L/280L
- Production: 1977–1980
- Assembly: Musashimurayama, Japan
- Designer: Shinichiro Sakurai

Body and chassis
- Body style: 4-door sedan 4-door hardtop 2-door hardtop
- Layout: front engine/rear drive
- Related: Nissan Skyline C210

Powertrain
- Engine: 1770 cc L18 I4; 1770 cc Z18 I4; 1952 cc L20B I4 (South Africa); 1952 cc Z20 I4; 1998 cc L20/L20E I6; 2393 cc L24 I6; 2753 cc L28/L28E I6; 1991 cc SD20 diesel I4
- Transmission: 3/4/5-speed manual 3-speed automatic

Dimensions
- Wheelbase: 2,670 mm (105.1 in)
- Length: 4,525 mm (178.1 in)
- Width: 1,685 mm (66.3 in)
- Height: 1,405 mm (55.3 in)
- Curb weight: 1,235 kg (2,722.7 lb)

The third generation appeared in January 1977. For the first time, the C230 was available in either saloon and hardtop coupé form, but also as a hardtop saloon without B-posts. The hardtop was only available with six-cylinder engines. Buyers could choose between a 1.8-litre four, a 2.0-litre inline-six (carburetted or fuel-injected, a first for the Laurel), a 2.8-litre six, or a 2.0-litre diesel four, sourced from Nissan Diesel as an alternative to the diesel-powered Toyota Mark II and the Isuzu Florian. Transmissions were mainly four- or five-speed manuals or a three-speed automatic, although a three-speed manual with a column shift was also available in the lower spec and commercial versions.

In the Autumn of 1978, the C230 received a mild facelift (type C231), marked visually by squared instead of round double headlights. The Toyota competitor was the Mark II coupé and sedan. Again, comfort was prioritized over handling and agility, while still using the identical MacPherson struts for the front wheels and Semi-trailing arm for the rear suspension from the Skyline.

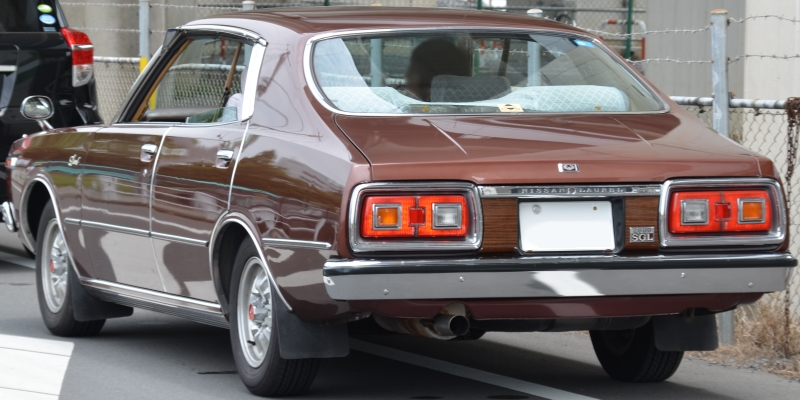
Nissan Laurel 2800 SGL Hardtop, rear view

One year later (January 1978) Nissan released a tenth anniversary edition, which adopted a special deep red body color known as "Laurel's Crimson", as well as trim-specific emblems, aluminum wheels and front grille. In 1979, the 2.4-litre L24 engine was added to the lineup. European outputs were 71 and 83 kW (97 and 113 PS) DIN for the 2.0 and the 2.4 inline-sixes. European buyers were attracted to the Laurel for its overall reliability, low price, and ample equipment. Datsun-Nissan South Africa also developed a two-litre four-cylinder option not offered elsewhere to suit local needs with a lower-cost, torquier engine than the two-litre six sold elsewhere. The L20B engine offered 72 kW (98 PS) and was paired with somewhat lower equipment than the 100 kW (136 PS) 280L sold alongside it.

November 1978 brought minor changes to the Laurel, including squaring off of the front headlights. The highest trim level, "Medalist", received air conditioning in addition to its OHC four-cylinder two-litre diesel engine. The 1800 cc cars switched to the newer Z18 crossflow engine, and all Laurels now met the Showa 53 (1979) gasoline vehicle emission regulations. The "Medalist" trim package name continued until 1999, when the Laurel was cancelled.

Later, in October 1979, a two-litre four-cylinder gasoline option (Z20-series) was added in several markets. Also new were the options of automatic transmission and the SGL equipment grade on diesel vehicles.

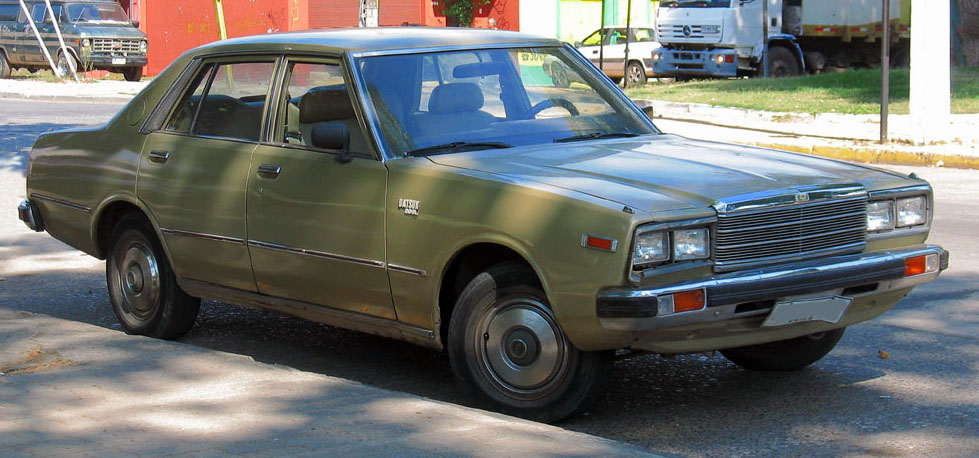
1979 Datsun 200L (Chile)

In February 1980, an electric sunroof was added to the hardtop version of the Medalist. This was the first year in which a sunroof was a model option.

In July 1980, a special limited edition "gold medalist" top-of-the-line trim was released.

== Fourth generation (C31; 1980) ==
Nissan Laurel
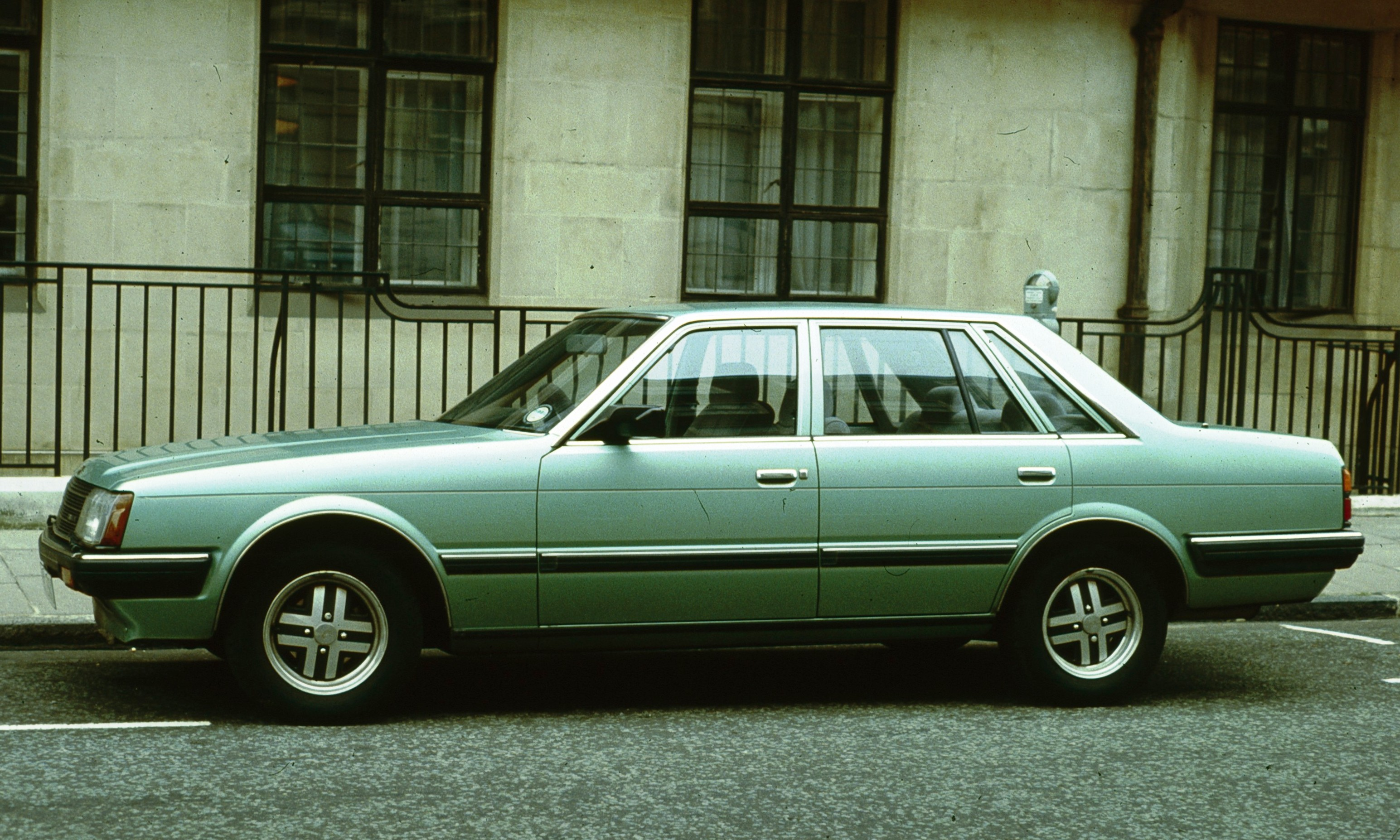
- Nissan Laurel Sedan (C31, U.K.)

Overview
- Model code: C31
- Also called: Datsun Laurel
- Production: 1980–1984
- Assembly: Musashimurayama, Japan
- Designer: Shinichiro Sakurai; Naganori Ito

Body and chassis
- Body style: 4-door hardtop 4-door sedan
- Layout: front engine/rear drive
- Related: Nissan Skyline (R30); Nissan Leopard (F30)

Powertrain
- Engine: 1770 cc Z18S/Z18P I4; 1809 cc CA18S I4; 1952 cc Z20S I4; 1998 cc L20/L20E I6; 1998 cc L20ET turbo I6; 2393 cc L24 I6 (export); 2753 cc L28E I6; 1952 cc LD20 diesel I4; 2792 cc LD28 diesel I6
- Transmission: 4/5-speed manual 3/4-speed automatic

Dimensions
- Wheelbase: 2,670 mm (105.1 in)
- Length: 4,635 mm (182.5 in)
- Width: 1,690 mm (66.5 in)
- Height: 1,360 mm (53.5 in)
- Curb weight: 1,245 kg (2,744.8 lb)

The C31 model, introduced in November 1980, was the first model that was only available in a four-door form, either as a sedan or hardtop. Engines for the C31 were 1.8-liter, 2.0-liter L20, 2.4-liter L24 gasoline, and 2.8-liter diesel. The coupé was replaced by the new Nissan Leopard F30, while the Laurel and Leopard continued to use the same MacPherson struts for the front wheels and semi-trailing arm with 4-links for the rear suspension from the Skyline. The Laurel remained exclusive to Nissan Motor Store, the Skyline to Nissan Prince Store, and the new Leopard coupe and sedan to Nissan Satio Store, so that the Laurel could maintain its position as a luxury vehicle.

The Toyota competitor was the Cresta hardtop; the Skyline was an alternative to the Chaser performance sedan, and the Leopard was introduced as the competitor to the Mark II. November 1982 saw the introduction of the exclusive "Laurel Turbo Medalist Givenchy Version" with Hubert de Givenchy doing the TV commercials in Japan, borrowing a marketing concept for an American luxury coupe, the Lincoln Continental Mark IV. The Givenchy was the top trim package, painted in Dark Charcoal over Silver two-tone paint, with contrasting medium-brown cloth upholstery with the Givenchy logo pattern woven into the fabric. In 1981, the Nissan Laurel Spirit, exclusive to Nissan Store locations, was offered as a smaller alternative to the Laurel, while still offering the luxury content of the larger car.

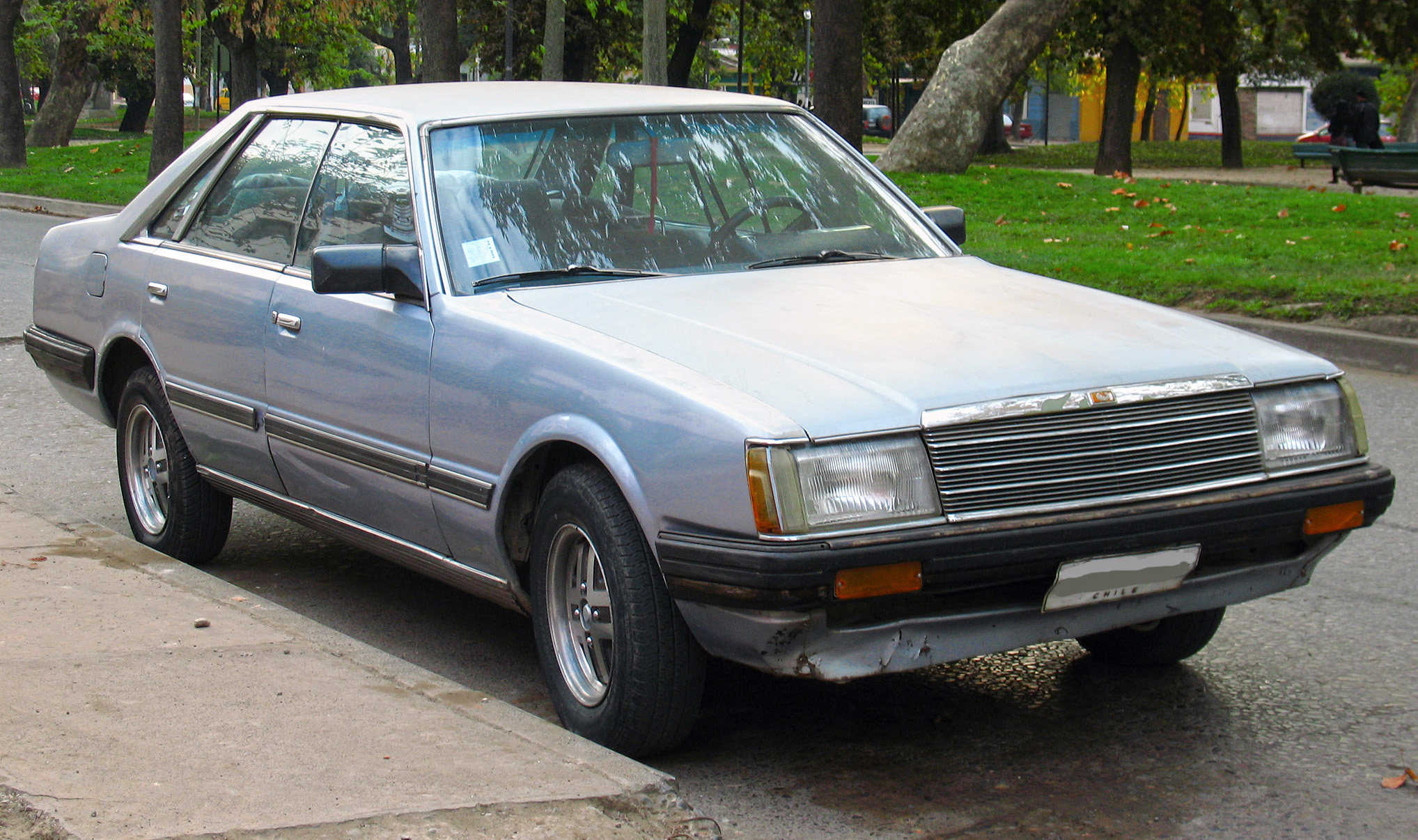
1981 Datsun Laurel 2.4 Hardtop (C31, Chile)

Development Supervisor Itirou Makoto Sakurai was in charge of developing the Laurel alongside the Skyline. The Laurel's redesign was carried out in a European style and tone. The coefficient of drag (Cd value) of the four-door hardtop is 0.38. The lowest-priced Z18 is a four-cylinder engine, as is the 2-litre Z20. The L20-series are inline-six cylinder models, also available in the fuel-injected L20E type, and as the turbocharged L20ET - the first turbocharged Laurel. On top of the lineup was the 2.8-litre L28E, and for some export markets the 2.4-litre L24 engine (usually carburetted) was also offered. Mostly for commercial use, there was the four-cylinder LD20 diesel engine, while private users usually preferred the larger six-cylinder LD28 type, which was also available with much better equipment.

In February 1981, the GX trim level was added. L20E sedan with independent rear suspension in the vehicle suspension formula (a six-link independent rear suspension was equipped as standard on the turbocharged cars). In November 1981, the car received some improvement and the Turbo Medalist model was new to the lineup.

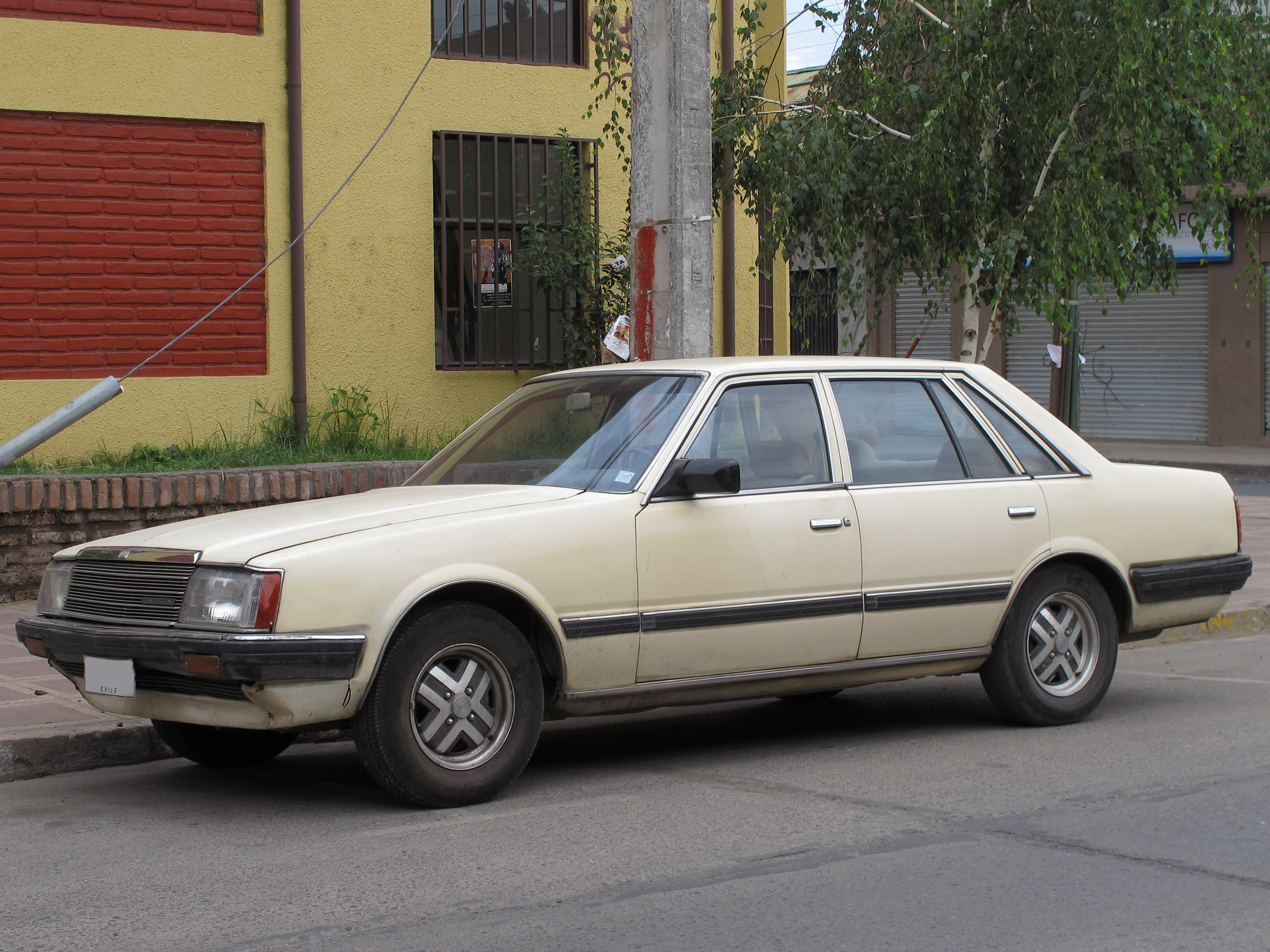
1983 Datsun Laurel 2.0 GL (C31) in Chile.

In September 1982, there was a minor change. Up a sense of luxury and large-scale extrusion in the chrome bumpers and rear license plate holder. The taillamp design was changed as well. Instead of the Z18 series engine, the new OHC four-cylinder 1809 cc CA18S engine was fitted to the Laurel 1.8. The engine range was overhauled at the time and now included the CA18S, L20E, turbocharged L20ET, the four-cylinder SOHC Z20S, and the diesel LD20 and LD28-6 models. The carburetted L20, the L28E, and the column-shifted LD20 (six-seater) were discontinued. The six-cylinder gasoline-powered car with automatic transmission and Super Touring equipment received an overdrive gear at the same time.

In November 1982, the Turbo Medalist Givenchy Version II was released. In February 1983, the "50 Special" released. In March, the Givenchy II version went on sale. In May, another 50 Special II vehicles were launched. In July, electrically retractable fender and door mirrors were introduced, a first. In October, taxi and driver instruction vehicles with an OHC LPG four-cylinder engine (Z18P, Standard or GL equipment) were added. SGL Grand Touring car (with a hubcap for Medalist colored bumper and large) and 50 Special Release III.

January 1984 saw the abolition of the 1.8-litre GL models, while the Turbo Medalist Givenchy III limited edition also went on sale.

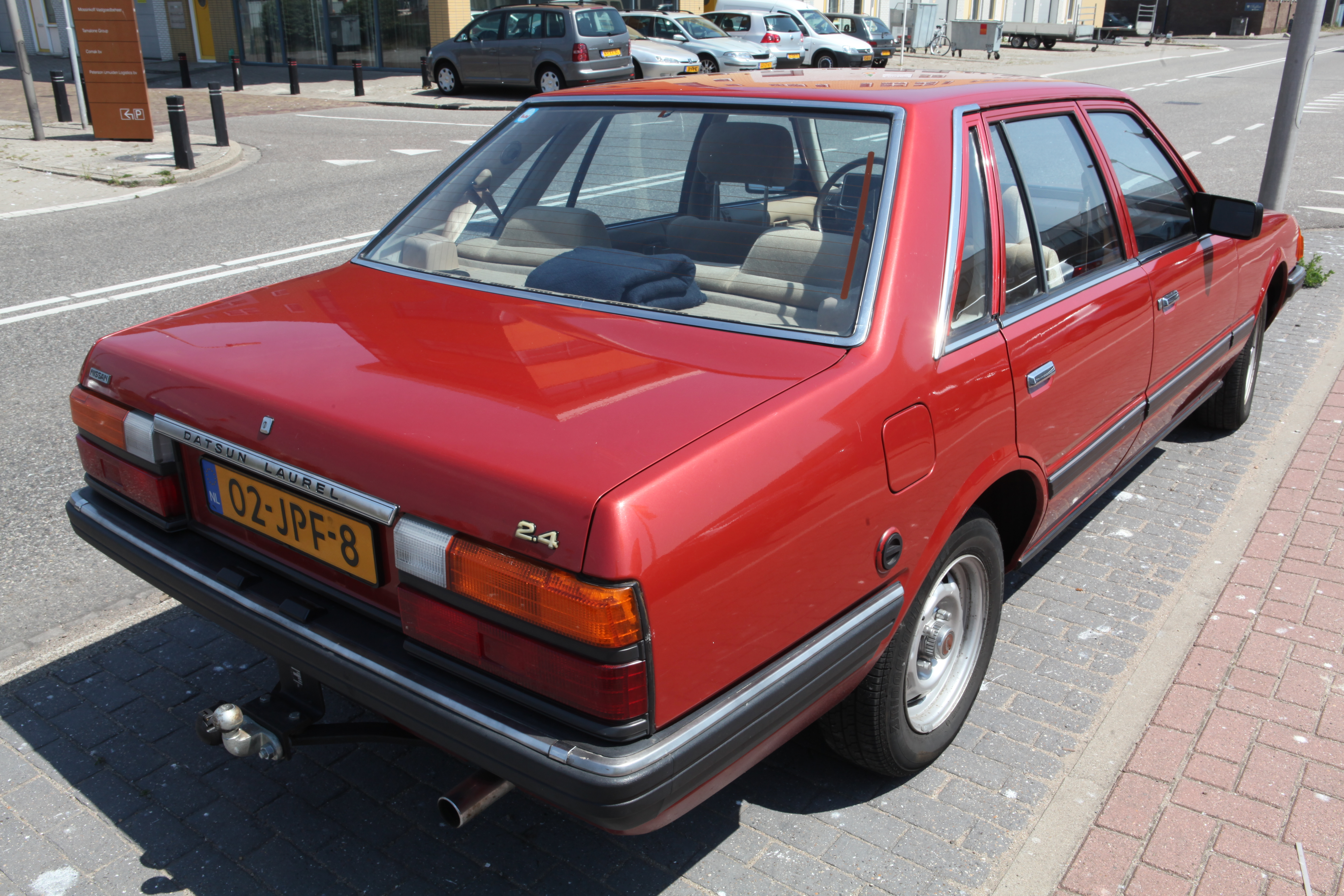
1982 Datsun Laurel 2.4 SGL Sedan (C31, The Netherlands)

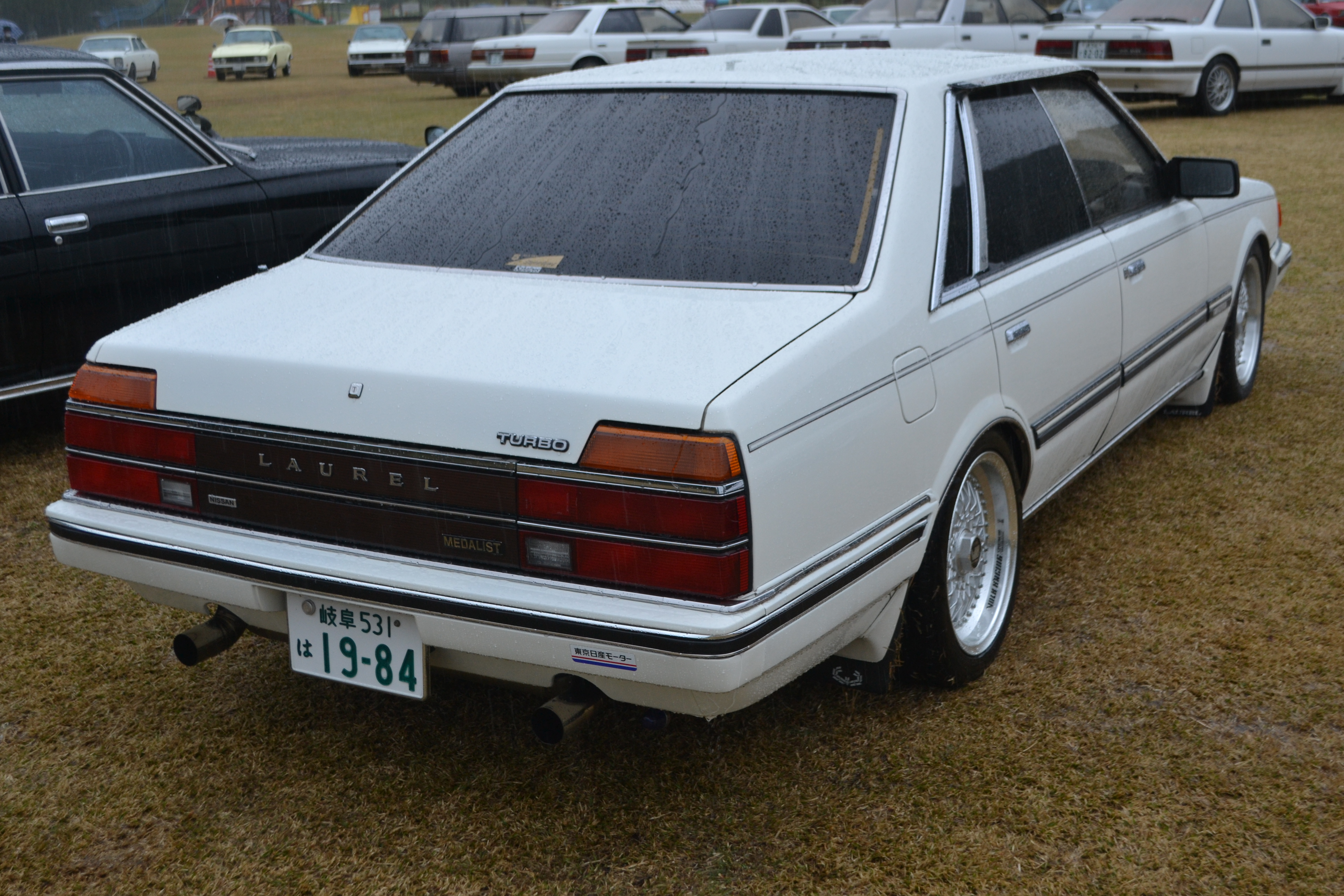
Nissan Laurel Hardtop 2000 Turbo Medalist (HC31, Japan)

European export models received the carburetted 2.0 (DX or SGL trim) and 2.4 inline-sixes (SGL), with 71 kW (97 PS) and 88 kW (120 PS) respectively, or with the large 2.8 diesel with 60 kW (82 PS). A fuel injected 2.4 with 127 PS (93 kW) later appeared for some markets. The 2.4-liter six only developed 113 PS (83 kW) in Swedish-market petrol cars as a result of that country's stringent emissions standards. As large Japanese cars are not very popular with private buyers in Europe, the diesel saw the lion's share of sales, mainly for taxi usage. Fitted with a detuned version of the L24 engine, the Laurel was introduced to the Middle Eastern (mainly Saudi) market in 1982.

This generation of Laurel was also sold in Indonesia and other Asian countries, but not in Australia or New Zealand.

== Fifth generation (C32; 1984) ==
Most of the information in this article was translated from the Nissan Laurel article on Japanese Wikipedia at ja:日産・ローレル.

Nissan Laurel
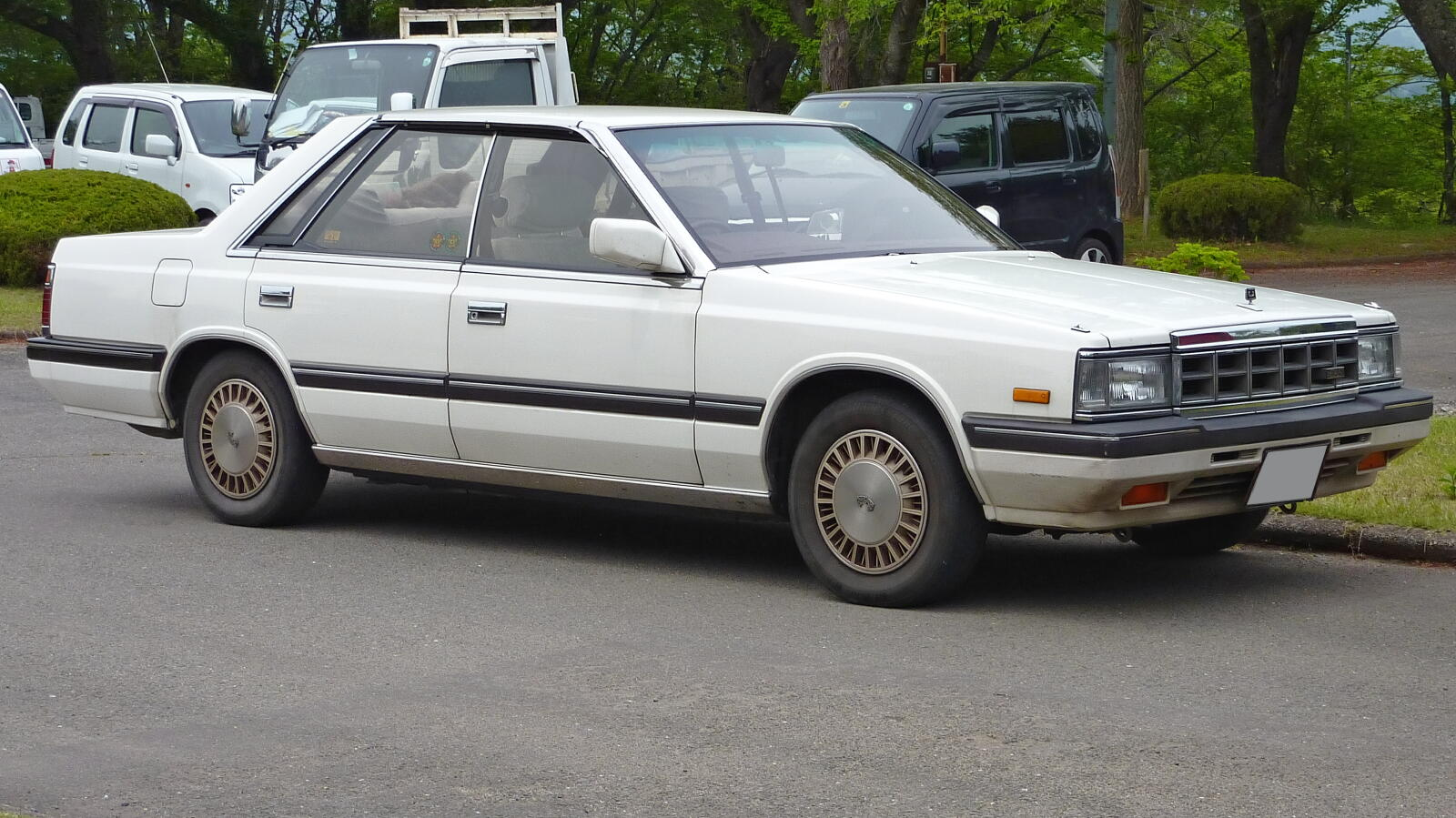
- Nissan Laurel Hardtop in Japan

Overview
- Model code: C32
- Production: 1984–1989
- Assembly: Musashimurayama, Japan
- Designer: Naganori Ito

Body and chassis
- Body style: 4-door hardtop 4-door sedan
- Layout: front engine/rear drive
- Related: Nissan Skyline R31; Nissan Leopard F31; Nissan Pintara (Australian export)

Powertrain
- Engine: 1.8 L CA18S I4; 2.0 L CA20S I4; 2.0 L RB20E I6; 2.0 L RB20DET turbo I6; 2.0 L VG20ET turbo V6; 2.4 L L24E I6; 3.0 L VG30S/VG30E V6; 2.8 L LD28 diesel I6; 2.8 L RD28 diesel I6
- Transmission: 5-speed manual 4-speed automatic

Dimensions
- Wheelbase: 2,670 mm (105.1 in)
- Length: 4,650 mm (183.1 in)
- Width: 1,690 mm (66.5 in)
- Height: 1,425 mm (56.1 in)
- Curb weight: 1,380 kg (3,042.4 lb)

Chronology
- Successor: Nissan Crew (taxi versions); Nissan Maxima (Europe); Nissan Laurel Altima (Middle East)

In October 1984, the C32 Laurel was released. Osamu Ito, Development Supervisor of the R31/32 Skyline, was assigned to redesign the Laurel. He saw the car needed significant changes and set about doing so. Some of the Laurel's new features included a 4-door sedan body, variations in the hardtop, and a more overall angular appearance, and also introduced the world's first electric retractable door mirrors. The C32 was the last model to be sold in Europe, where the Laurel was replaced by the front-wheel-drive Nissan Maxima (PU11) which was not available as a diesel and had a sportier, more luxurious air.

The C32 were fitted with a variety of gasoline engines, inline-fours and V6 engines ranging from 1.8 to 3.0 liters. Some engines, like the L24 and the electronically carbureted VG30S were reserved for export. The C32 Laurel also came with the LD28 diesel. In 1987, there were a minor facelift which revised the bumpers, new grilles and new lights in the front and back. The LD28 diesel engine were swapped out in favor of the similarly dimensioned RD28. This generation was the only Laurel to be equipped with a V6 engine. The suspension remained as the MacPherson struts for the front wheels and semi-trailing arm with 4-links for the rear suspension from the Skyline.

If the Laurel was installed with the "Super Sonic Suspension" system, a sonar module was mounted under the front bumper and scanned the road surface, adjusting the suspension accordingly via actuators mounted on all four coil over shock absorbers and the front suspension was installed with a multi-link suspension. There was also a switch on the center console that allowed the driver to limit the adjustment information being provided by the sonar sensor, and change the setting from "Auto" to "Soft", "Medium" or "Hard" settings. The speed-sensitive rack-and-pinion power steering could also be separately reduced for a sporting feeling, and the suspension setting would modify both the steering feel and the shift points on the automatic transmission.

The Medalist could be optionally installed with a 6-inch CRT TV screen installed in the dashboard below the A/C controls that allowed passengers to watch broadcast TV if the transmission was in Park and the parking brake applied. The screen was not touch sensitive, and didn't offer a CD-ROM based navigation system. The display also showed AM/FM stereo settings. The video entertainment system also had RCA connections to attach a camcorder and watch recorded video. The stereo and video equipment was supplied by Sony. Also available was a modification to the front passenger seat Nissan called "Partner Comfort Seat" where the top portion of the front passenger seat was further articulated to tilt forward, supporting the passengers shoulders while allowing the seatback structure to recline. The front edge of the passenger seat cushion was also adjustable.

To enhance rear passenger comfort and convenience, the four-door hardtop front driver and passenger seat belt shoulder strap was connected at the top to the ceiling, however, the upper portion could be detached, with the shoulder strap emerging from the side door support, resting on the driver's and passenger's shoulder. This provided rear passengers an unobstructed view from the rear seat without the seat belt hanging from the ceiling when the windows were retracted. The upper part would then swing up to the ceiling and could be fastened into place.

The styling of the Nissan Laurel began to resemble the larger Gloria but on a slightly smaller platform, with reduced tax liability based on the vehicles dimensions. The Toyota competitor was the Cresta hardtop, while the Skyline was the competitor to the Chaser sedan and in 1986, the Honda Vigor.

The RB20E engine was equipped with six-cylinder series SOHC2.0L, VG20ET-SOHC2.0L V6 turbo, CA18S-series four-cylinder (LPG and specifications), LD28-series 6-cylinder diesel SOHC2.8L. The car's system also shared a Skyline rack-and-pinion steering rack.

In May 1985, the Grand Extra Limited edition was released. Detail improvements were made in October 1985 and January 1986.

In October 1986, there were mechanical changes along with significant modifications to the exterior. There was a new turbocharged DOHC engine, the 2.0-liter RB20DET 24-valve six-cylinder, while the LD28 diesel engine was replaced by the new RD28-series six-cylinder diesel engine.

In May 1987, the "Grande Extra White Special" edition was released. In August of the same year, the Grande Touring Limited was added to lineup.

Beginning January 1988, the Laurel was joined by a longer version at 2,735 mm (107.7 in) of the Nissan Gloria stablemate, called the Nissan Gloria Cima which offered an improved version of the V6 engine available on the Laurel, and an optionally available turbocharged version of the same V6.

In February 1988, there was an improved and some 20 releases Super medalist anniversary special edition. In May 1988, the "White Limited" model was released. In September of the same year, the Super Series Selection was added to the lineup. In December, private car and driving school versions were discontinued, leaving only taxis and other commercial models. In January 1989, Laurels with an automatic gearbox received a shift lock.

The taxi/commercial versions of the fifth generation were finally discontinued in July 1993, when they were replaced by the Nissan Crew.

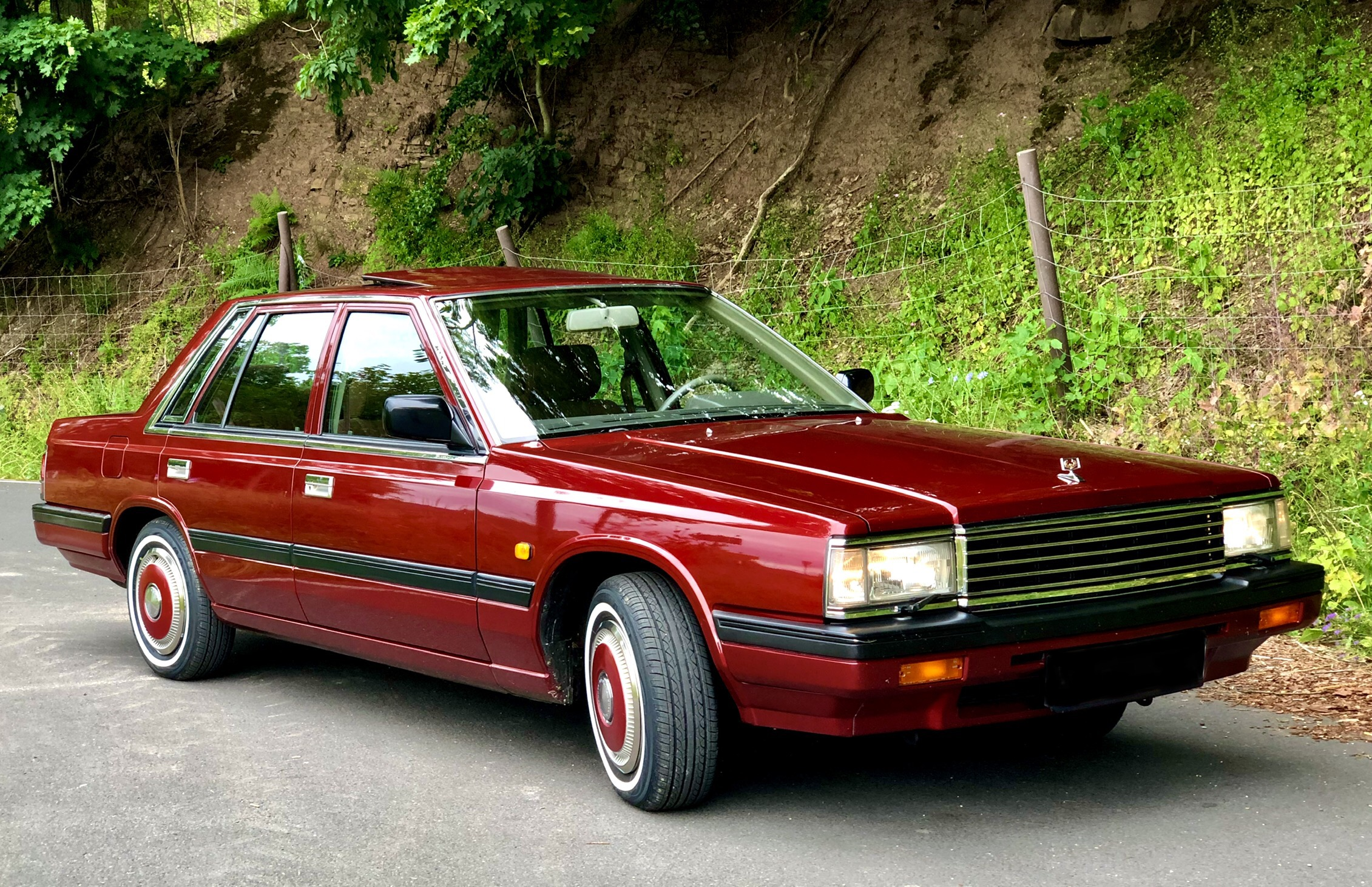
Nissan Laurel sedan with "Laurel's Crimson" appearance package

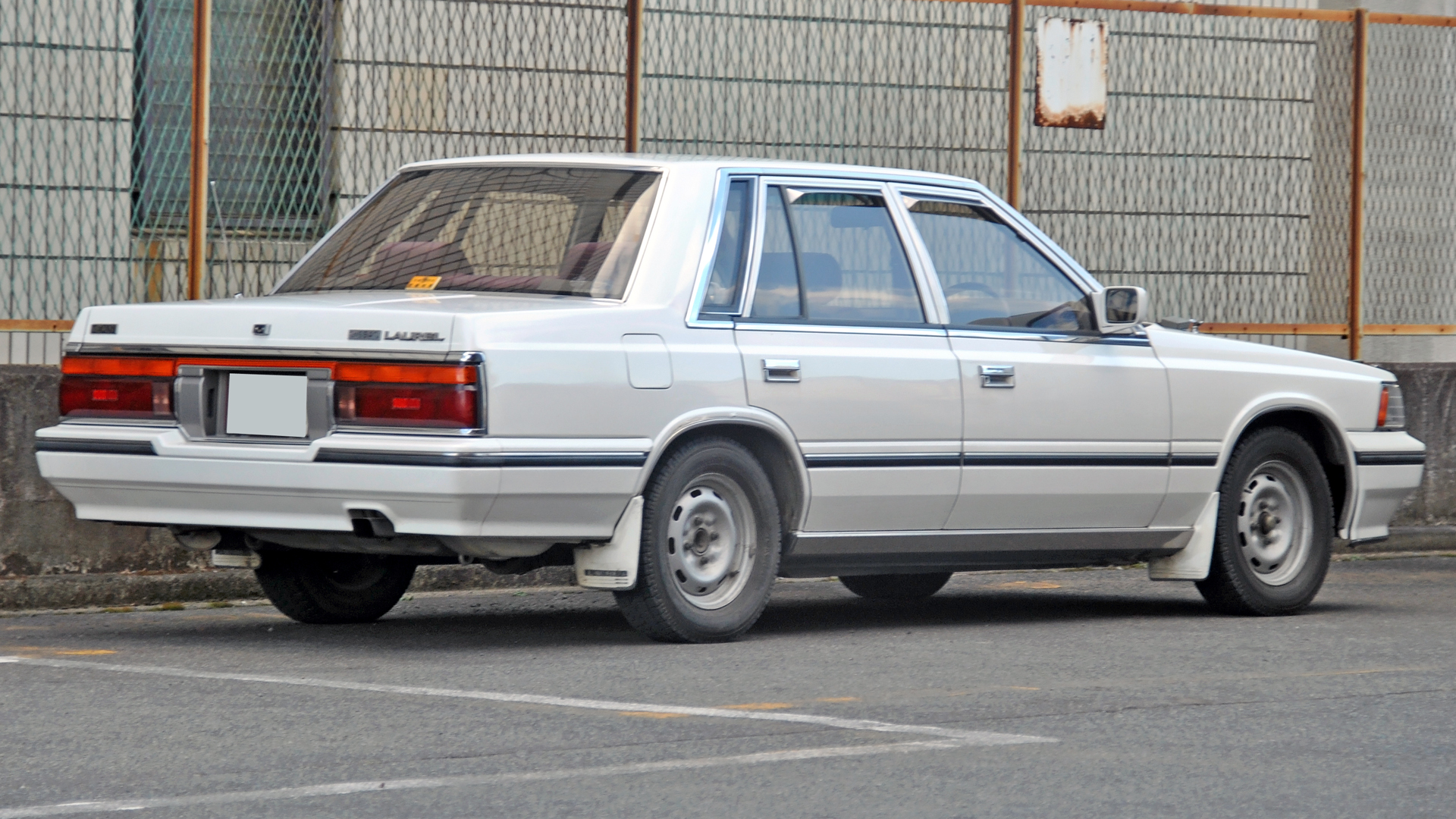
Nissan Laurel Sedan (Japan)

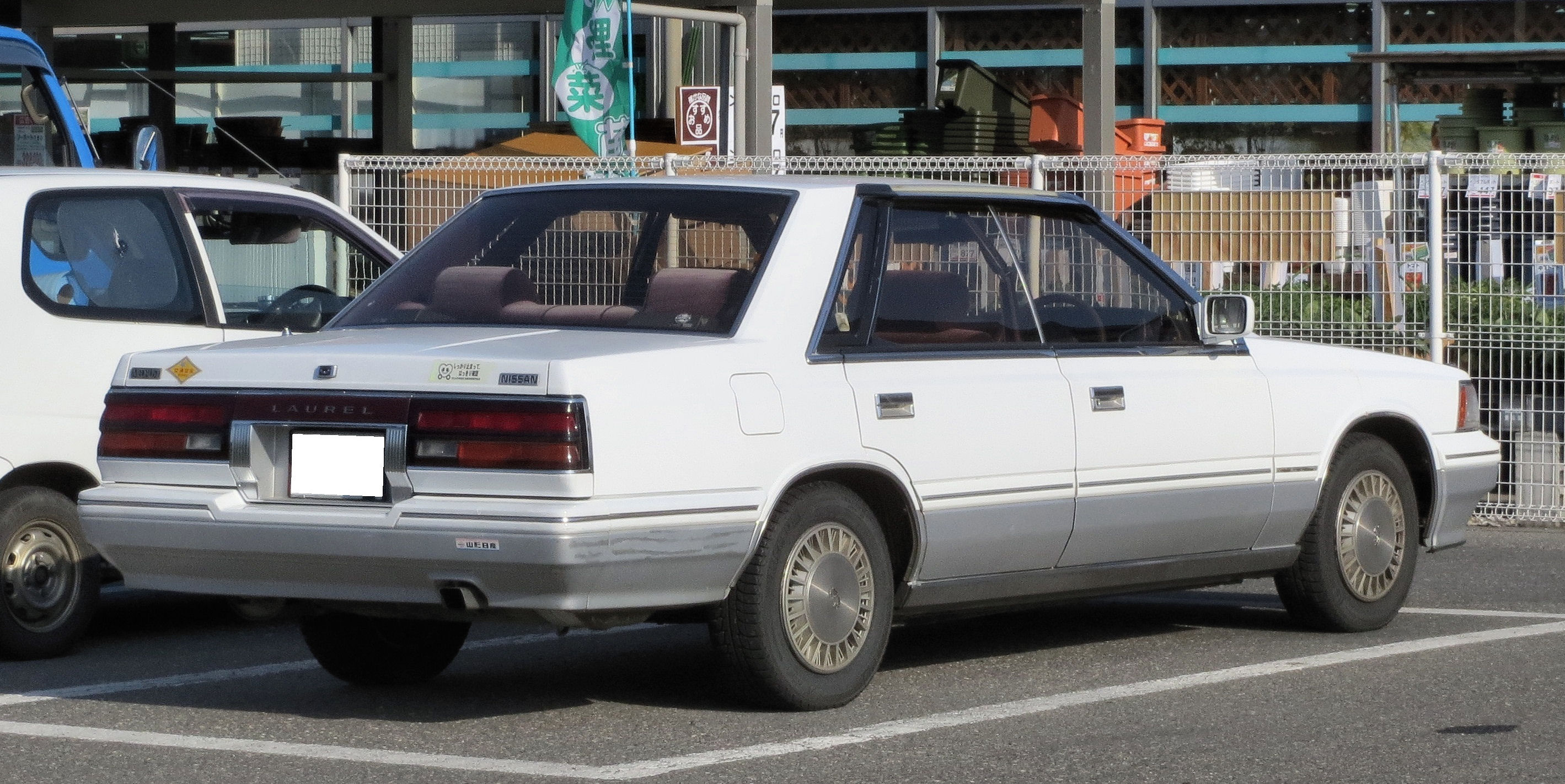
Nissan Laurel Medalist hardtop (facelift, rear view; JDM)

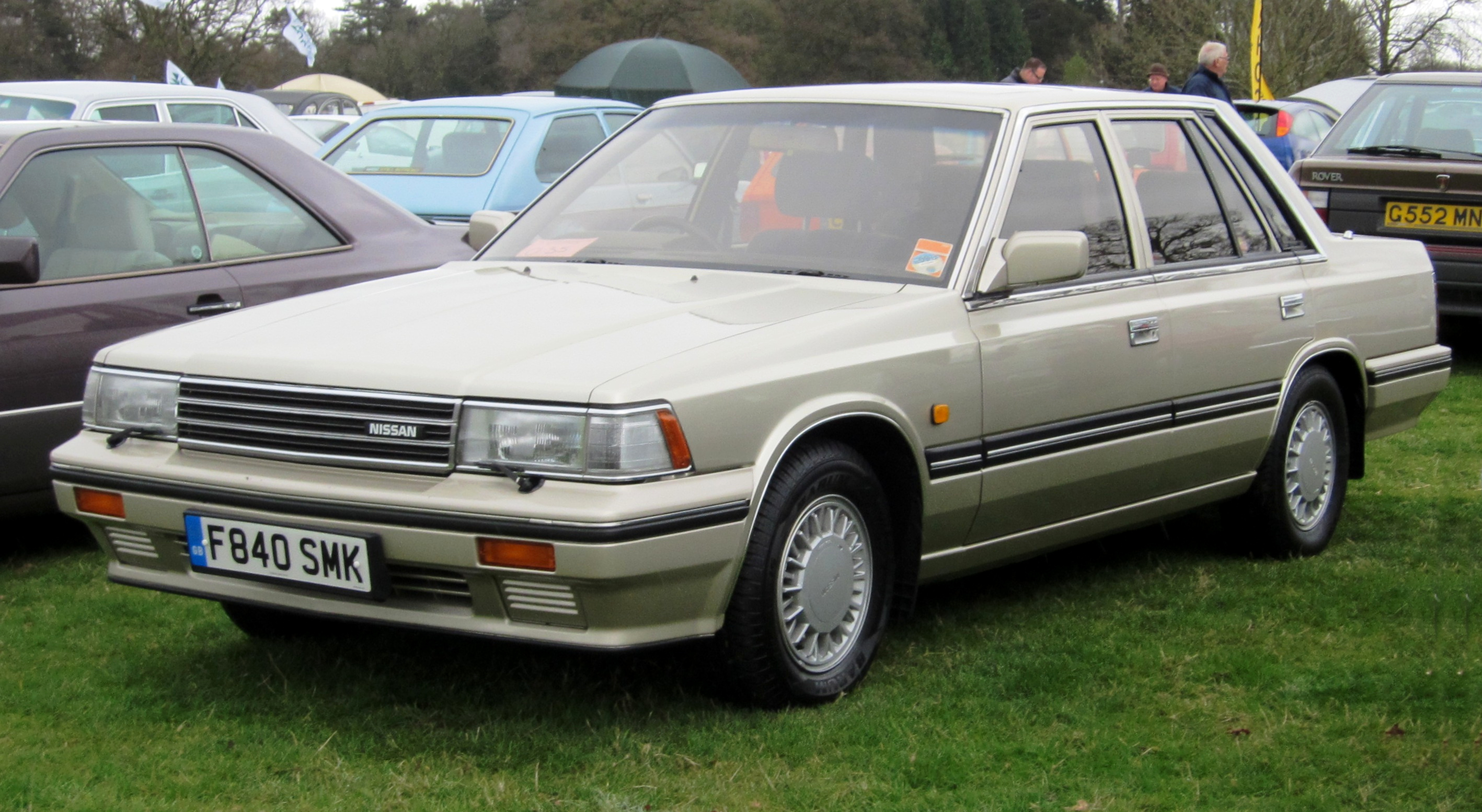
Nissan Laurel Saloon (facelift; UK)

== Sixth generation (C33; 1989) ==
Most of the information in this article was translated from the Nissan Laurel article on Japanese Wikipedia at ja:日産・ローレル.

Nissan Laurel
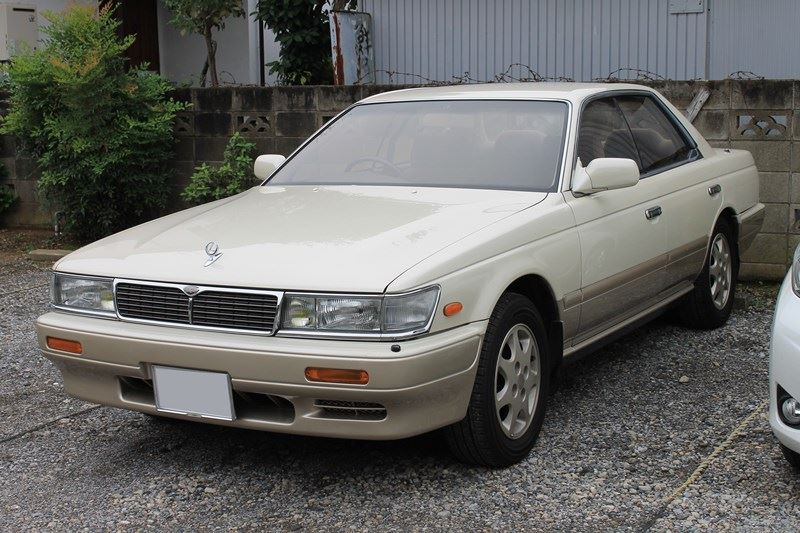
- Nissan Laurel Medalist Twincam Turbo

Overview
- Model code: C33
- Production: 1989–1993
- Assembly: Musashimurayama, Japan
- Designer: Naganori Ito (1986)

Body and chassis
- Body style: 4-door hardtop
- Layout: front engine/rear drive
- Related: Nissan Skyline R32; Nissan Cefiro A31; Nissan Laurel Altima A31

Powertrain
- Engine: 1.8 L CA18i I4; 2.0 L RB20E I6; 2.0 L RB20DE DOHC I6; 2.0 L RB20DET turbo I6; 2.5 L RB25DE DOHC I6; 2.8 L RD28 diesel I6
- Transmission: 5-speed manual 4/5-speed automatic

Dimensions
- Wheelbase: 2,670 mm (105.1 in)
- Length: 4,690 mm (184.6 in)
- Width: 1,695 mm (66.7 in)
- Height: 1,365 mm (53.7 in)
- Curb weight: 1,330 kg (2,932.1 lb)

Benefiting from Project 901, the C33 Laurel was announced in December 1988. In January 1989, the C33 went on sale and was now only available as a four-door hardtop. V6 engines were no longer available, having been replaced by straight-sixes. The base, 1.8-litre, four-cylinder engine (CA18i) was carried over from the previous generation; available options consisted of a 2-litre six of an SOHC (RB20E), DOHC (RB20DE), or DOHC Turbo (RB20DET) layout, and a 2.8-litre diesel inline-six (RD28). Early in 1991, a DOHC 2.5-litre inline-six coupled to a five-speed automatic became available. There was also a driving school model available, only with the four-cylinder model (CA18i) petrol engine or the six-cylinder diesel (RD28).

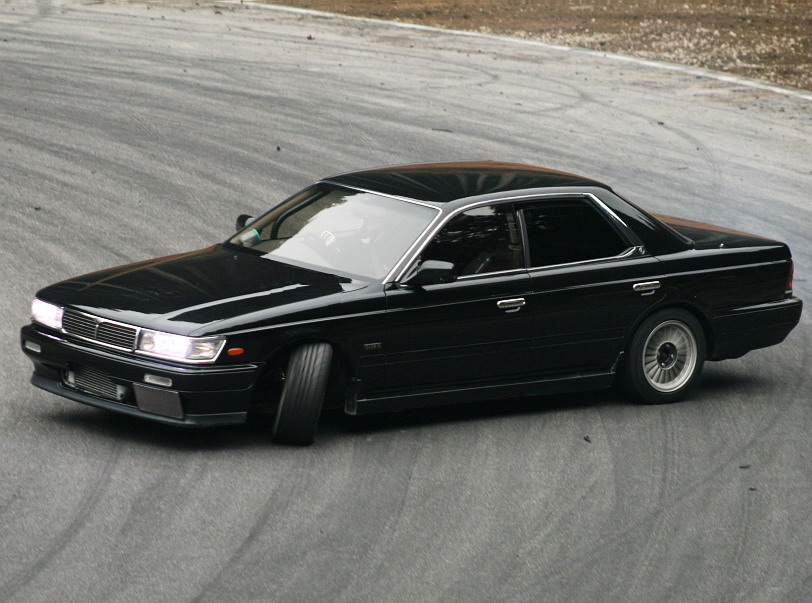
Nissan Laurel Medalist Club S "drifting" in Japan

The C33, in particular, is very popular as a "drift car," because it has the same floor plan as the Nissan A31 Cefiro and the four-door Nissan Skyline R32. They also have many interchangeable parts, which makes them ideal for modification. The suspension continued to offer MacPherson struts for all wheels but now offered multi-links for the rear suspension from the Skyline, including optional HICAS II rear-wheel steering available on the Club S and Twin Cam Medalist models.

The Toyota competitor was the Cresta while the new Honda Inspire, Mitsubishi Emeraude and the new Mazda luxury sedan ɛ̃fini MS-8 were also alternatives in the increasingly crowded segment. The Laurel was repositioned slightly higher as a larger luxury sedan, as its exterior dimensions matched the more senior Nissan Cedric and Nissan Gloria, which were exclusive to separate Japanese Nissan dealerships (Nissan Store for the Cedric, Nissan Prince Store for the Gloria). The Laurel remained exclusive to Japanese dealership Nissan Motor Store locations.

The four-door hardtop front driver and passenger seat belt shoulder strap was connected at the top to the ceiling to enhance rear passenger comfort and convenience. However, the upper portion could be detached, with the shoulder strap emerging from the side door support, resting on the driver's and passenger's shoulders. This provided rear passengers with an unobstructed view from the rear seat without the seat belt hanging from the ceiling when the windows were retracted. The upper part then swung up to the ceiling and could be fastened in place. Trim levels included the Medalist, Medalist Club S, and Gran Limited. The Club S was the only C33 Laurel with the RB25DE option and a front lip spoiler; other models offered only the RB20, CA18, and RD28 engines.

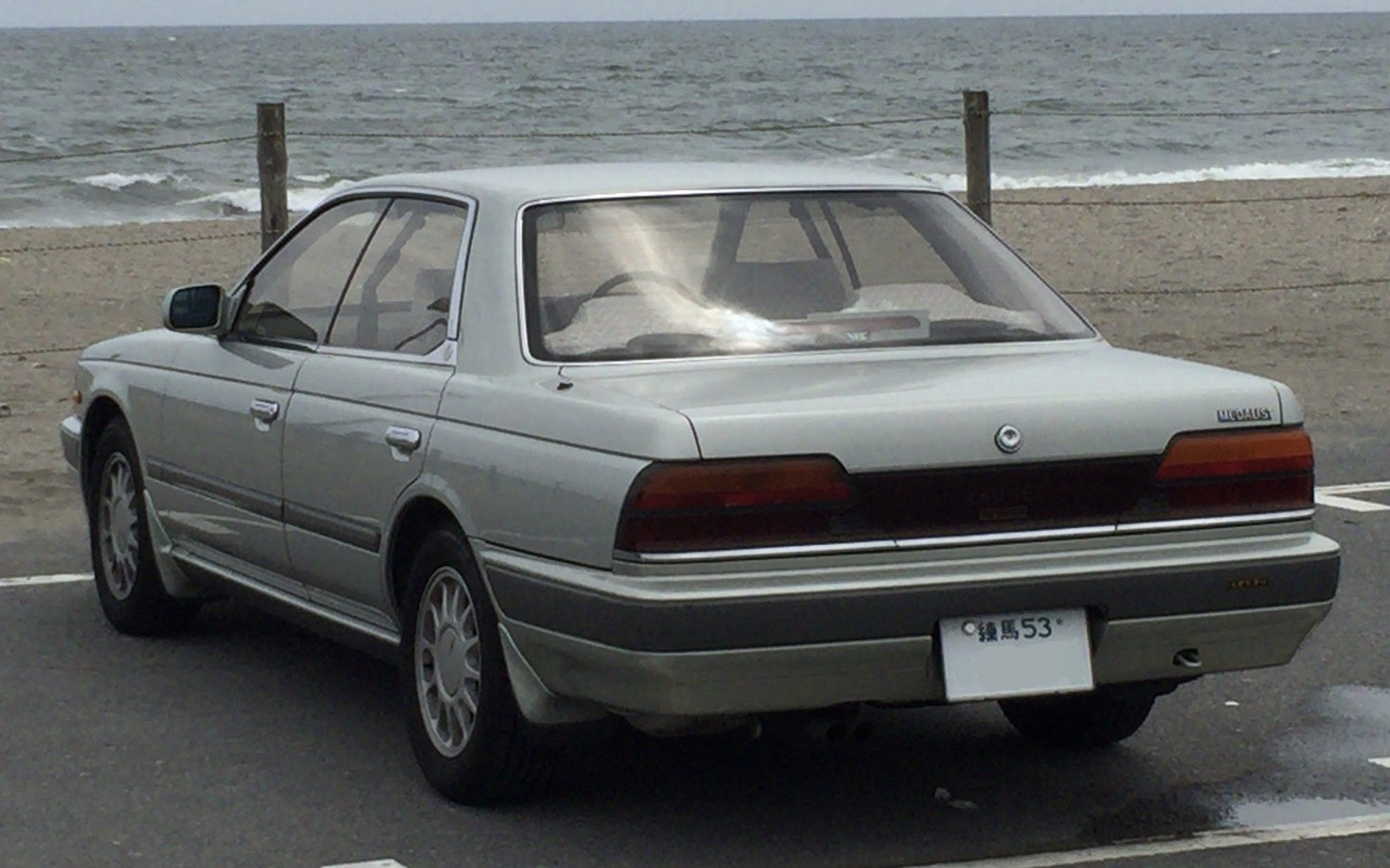
Nissan Laurel 2.0 Medalist (C33) in Japan.

In January 1991, the Laurel was facelifted, and a new RB20E/RB20DE-powered 5-speed AT model crept into the range. In November 1991, 3-series cars RB25DE Catalogue DOHC2.5L added a grade-six-cylinder engine. 2.5L existing and additional models are equipped with previous-generation high-mount side lamps and side-door airbags. The DUET-SS Super Sonic Suspension was also introduced as an extra-cost option on Gran Limited-equipped vehicles.

By January 1992, cumulative production achieved 2 million units.

== Seventh generation (C34; 1993) ==
Most of the information in this article was translated from the Nissan Laurel article on Japanese Wikipedia at ja:日産・ローレル.

Nissan Laurel
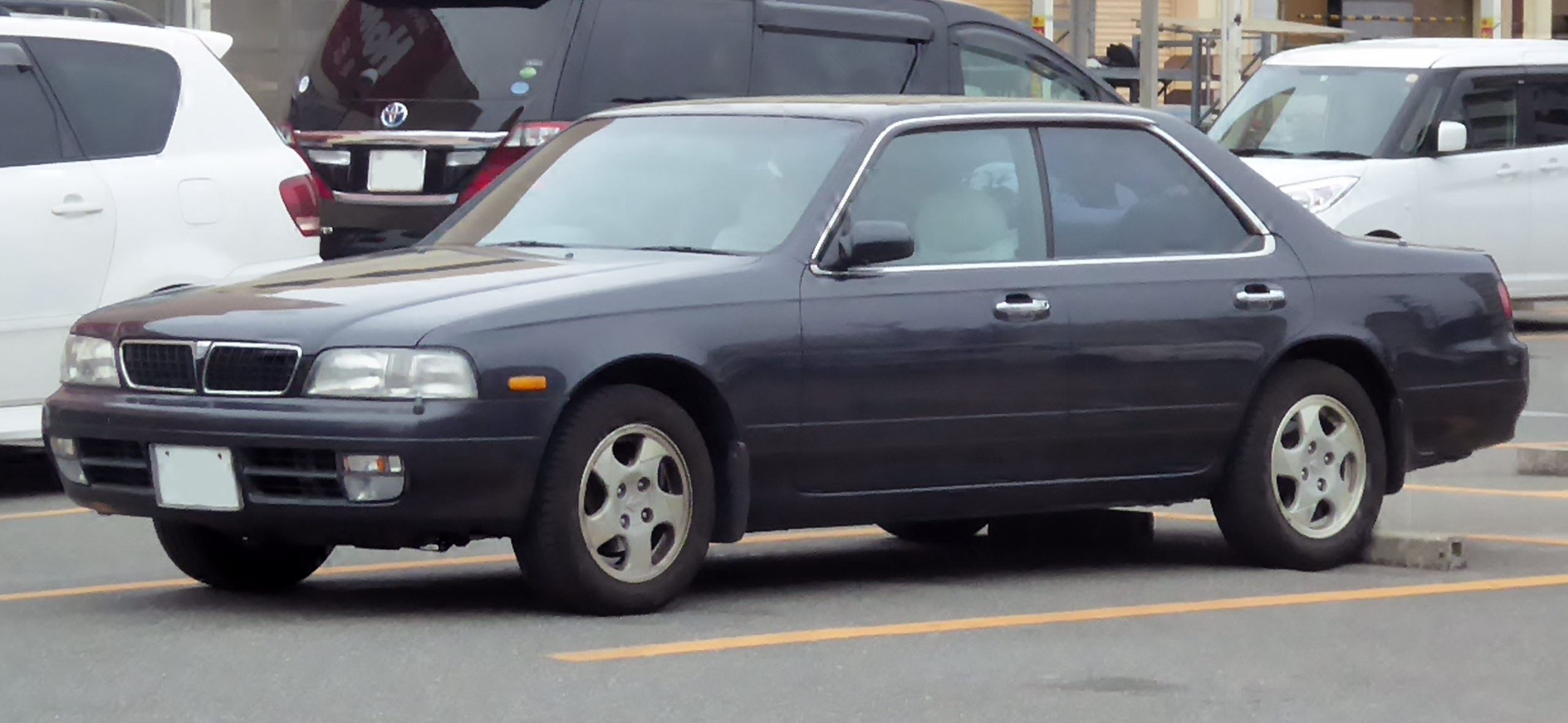
- Nissan Laurel Club S (C34) (Japan)

Overview
- Model code: C34
- Production: 1993–1997
- Assembly: Musashimurayama, Japan
- Designer: Kozo Watanabe (1996)

Body and chassis
- Body style: 4-door hardtop
- Layout: Front engine, rear-wheel drive / four-wheel drive
- Related: Nissan Skyline R33; Nissan Stagea Series I WC34

Powertrain
- Engine: Gasoline: 2.0 L RB20E I6; 2.0 L RB20DE DOHC 24v I6; 2.5 L RB25DE DOHC 24v I6; 2.5 L RB25DET turbo DOHC 24v I6; Diesel: 2.8 L RD28 18v I6
- Transmission: 5-speed manual (Medalist Diesel); 4-/5-speed automatic

Dimensions
- Wheelbase: 2,720 mm (107.1 in)
- Length: 4,710 mm (185.4 in)
- Width: 1,720 mm (67.7 in)
- Height: 1,390 mm (54.7 in)
- Curb weight: 1,490 kg (3,284.9 lb)

The new Laurel C34 was released in January 1993. To meet stricter side-impact legislation, it was no longer available in a pillarless hardtop sedan configuration; the single-body style offered was a regular saloon with B-posts. Gone as well was the four-cylinder engine. Available engines included a 2.0 L six (SOHC or DOHC), a 2.5 L DOHC six, and a 2.8 L diesel six. The diesel engine now had three valves per cylinder, for a total of 18. This series offered broader and longer body dimensions, which meant that under Japanese dimension regulations, all Laurels were now in the large car category, including models with engines displacing less than 2 liters. Japanese owners were now liable for additional taxes paid yearly in addition to standard registration, road tax, and inspection costs. Large cars have a leading "3" at the top of the license plate, while compact cars have a "5". Manufacturing remained at the Murayama plant. The smaller Laurel Spirit was replaced by the all-new Nissan Presea.

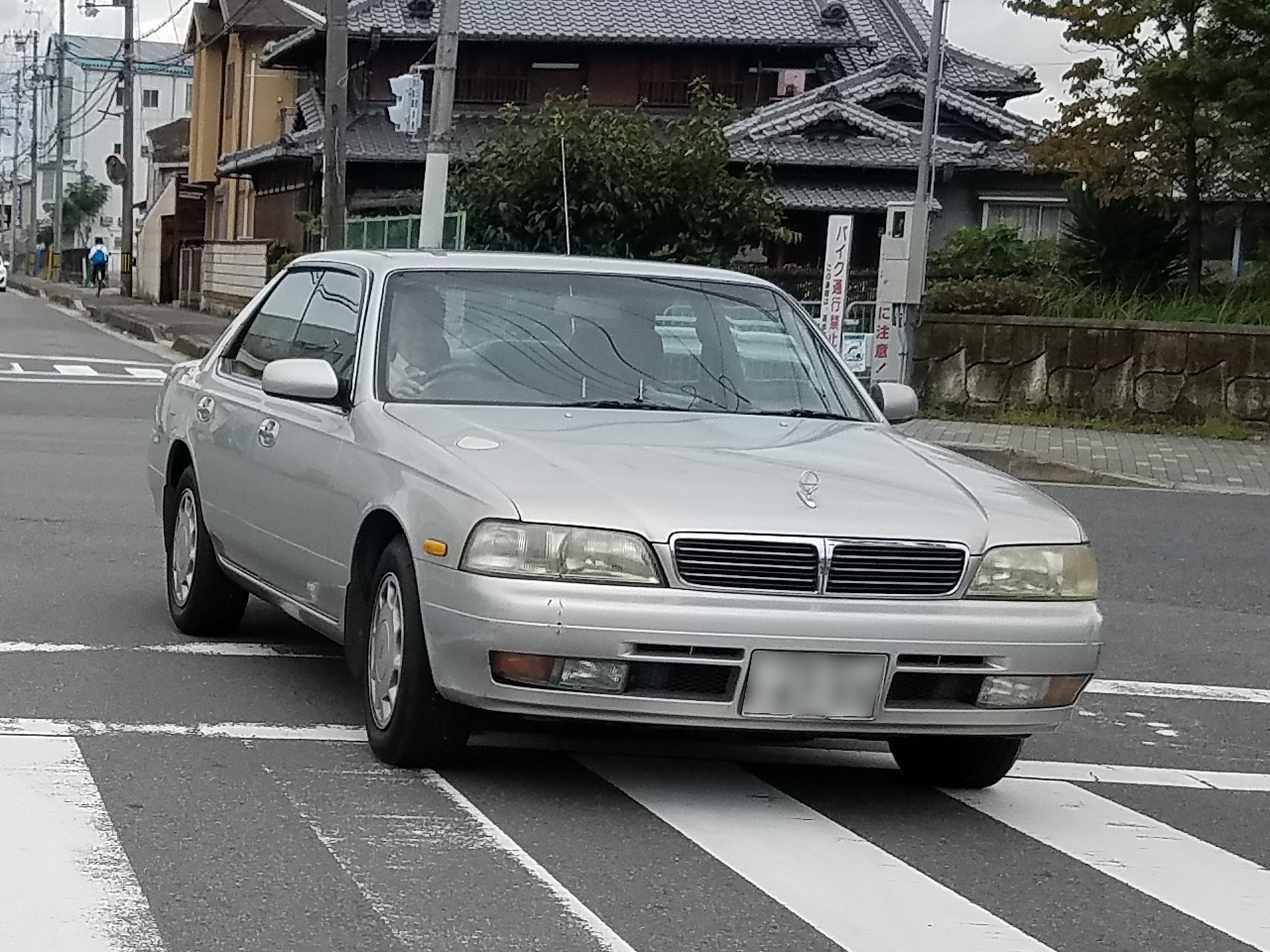
Nissan Laurel Medalist (HC34) in Japan

Some of the later models featured more sophistication, such as Nissan's proprietary 4-wheel steering (Super HICAS) or 4-wheel drive (ATTESA E-TS) systems, which were shared with the Skyline models, along with ABS brakes. The Laurel also offered ASCD (auto speed control) with steering wheel switches on the top-of-the-line Medalist VG Selection. A 5-speed manual transmission was only available in the Medalist diesel version, with no manually shifted gasoline cars offered. Diesel and single-cam gasoline cars received four-speed automatics; more powerful gasoline cars all got a five-speed automatic. The suspension and trim packages now differed based on whether it was RWD or AWD. If it was rear-drive "Medalist", it was MacPherson struts for the front wheels but now offered multi-links for the rear suspension from the Skyline. If it was the AWD "Club" trim package, it used the multi-link for the front wheels to accommodate ATTESA.

In May 1993, an RB20E-engined Club S was added, as the 2.5-only Club S was not a strong seller. In July and August 1993, special editions were launched to celebrate Nissan's 60th anniversary, the Medalist S 60th Anniversary, and the Club SJ 60th Anniversary, respectively.

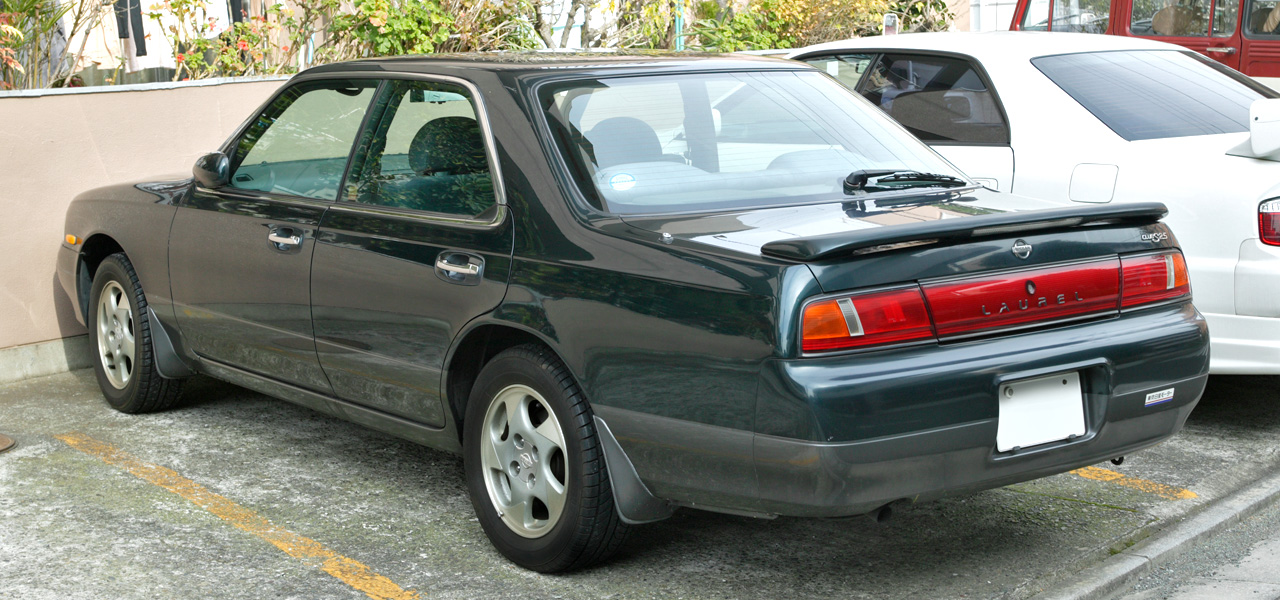
Early/Mid-series Nissan Laurel Club S in Japan

January 1994 saw a mid-life facelift for the C34 Laurel. Medalist versions received a center grille finisher, while the Club S received a sportier-looking grille and an exclusive front bumper design, necessitating other minor changes around the front end. Medalist and Club S specifications were more differentiated than before. The Club S also received a new engine, the turbocharged 24-valve DOHC RB25DET straight-six, while the 24-valve RB20DE model was discontinued. The turbo version received a four-speed automatic, as the engine produces too much torque for the five-speed JATCO RE5R01A.

The new Club S Type X was a more expensive version. At the same time, the regular Club S received a few downgrades, such as a Premium Tricot interior rather than the earlier Ultrasuede, which was now only a cost option on the Type X. The Medalist J and the basic Grand Cruise model was replaced by the Medalist L and the Grand Saloon. Minor cost-cutting led to Medalists using wheel trims shared with other Nissan automobiles. At the same time, the stereo head was changed from a Laurel-only dedicated size to a single DIN regular format.

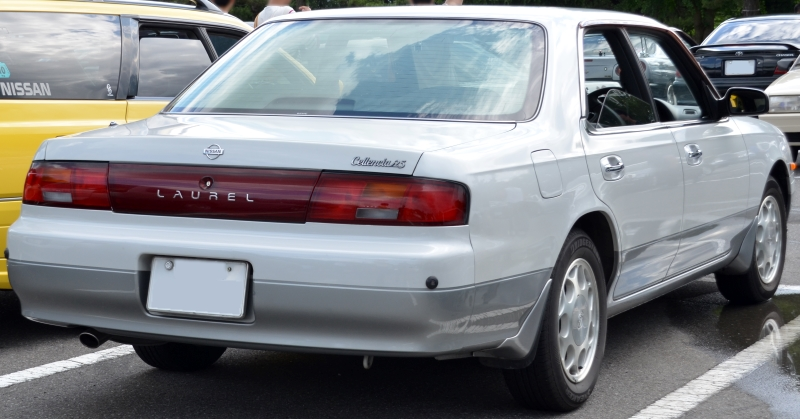
Facelifted rear end of a 1996-1997 Laurel 25 Medalist Cellencia

The Laurel underwent a minor change in September 1994, with a significant rear-end redesign. Front-end design remained largely untouched, while a driver's SRS airbag became standard fitment. New was the first four-wheel-drive Laurel and a Medalist Turbo model. The Medalist Turbo received the same sporty-looking front end as the Club S. In January 1995, a new, well-equipped Club S Selection was introduced. In September 1995, another special edition appeared, the 20E-engined Medalist Dual Limited.

A final update took place in May 1996. The steering wheel design was changed, and a passenger airbag became standard. More special editions also appeared in the form of the "Celencia," which received dedicated seat fabric, a unique grille, and tinted window glass. In February 1997, the ABS-equipped Celencia SV and Celencia Medalist SV appeared. Production ended in May 1997, with sales continuing from stock until the eighth generation Laurel replaced it.

== Eighth generation (C35; 1997) ==
Most of the information in this article was translated from the Nissan Laurel article on Japanese Wikipedia at ja:日産・ローレル.

Nissan Laurel
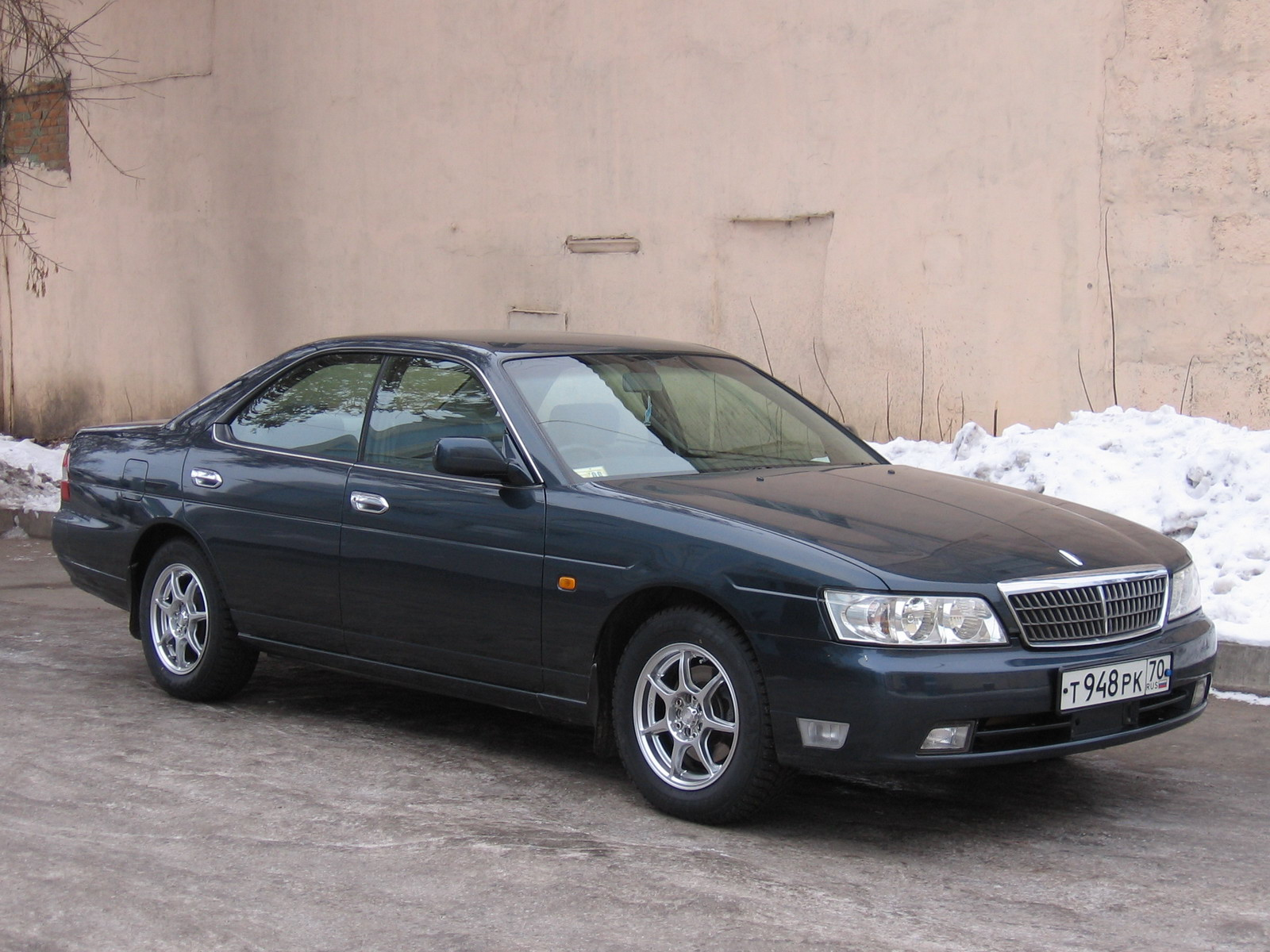
- Nissan Laurel 2.5 Medalist

Overview
- Model code: C35
- Production: 1997–2002
- Assembly: Musashimurayama, Tokyo, Japan; Kaminokawa, Tochigi, Japan
- Designer: Kozo Watanabe (1996)

Body and chassis
- Body style: 4-door hardtop
- Layout: Front engine, rear-wheel drive / four-wheel drive
- Related: Nissan Skyline R34; Nissan Stagea Series II WC34

Powertrain
- Engine: 2.0 L RB20DE NEO I6; 2.5 L RB25DE NEO I6; 2.5 L RB25DET NEO turbo I6; 2.5 L RB25DET turbo I6; 2.8 L RD28E diesel SOHC I6
- Transmission: 4-speed automatic RE4R01B

Dimensions
- Wheelbase: 2,720 mm (107.1 in)
- Length: 4,765 mm (187.6 in)
- Width: 1,730 mm (68.1 in)
- Height: 1,400 mm (55.1 in)
- Curb weight: 1,440 kg (3,174.7 lb)

Chronology
- Successor: Nissan Teana

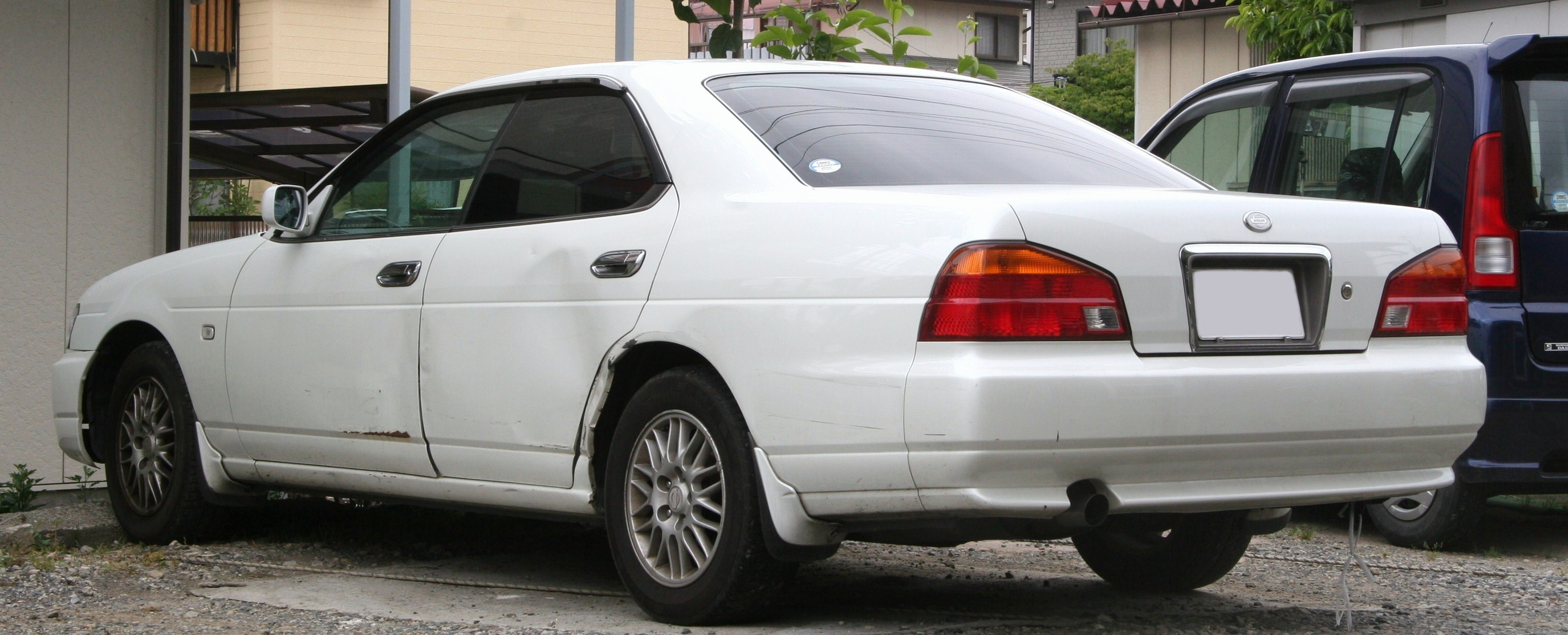
Nissan Laurel 2.5 Medalist

The eighth and last generation debuted in June 1997. Holding to traditional product refreshes, the C35 Laurel remained consistent with its established role as the slightly longer Skyline. It has a softer appearance and a luxury approach to equipment, performance, handling, and market value in an ever-increasing competitive market. Competition grew from within, with the Cedric and Gloria Gran Turismo, the Cima Grand Touring, and the growing international popularity of the Skyline. Economic conditions were having a substantial effect on sales as the "bubble economy" began to collapse. Starting in 1999, the Nissan Japanese dealership network was reorganized, and the Laurel was now available at Nissan Blue Stage locations. The Laurel was now in a more crowded list of available performance luxury sedans.

The available engines were the RB25DET NEO turbo, the RB25DET turbo, the RB25DE NEO engine, the RB20DE NEO, and all were updated with Nissan variable valve timing technology called NEO. The RD28E diesel SOHC I6 remained. The only transmission available was the four-speed automatic, while the Dualmatic M-ATx automatic transmission with manual mode was optional for all RWD vehicles. The model number is HC35 for the 2000cc model, GC35 for the 2WD model (GCC35 for SUPER HICAS specification)/GNC35 for the 4WD model, and SC35 for the diesel engine model.

The suspension package remained the same as the previous generation, whether it was RWD or AWD, and the last separation generation continued; the Medalist was RWD, and the Club was either RWD or optional AWD. If it was rear-drive, it was MacPherson struts for the front wheels but now offered multi-links for the rear suspension from the Skyline. If it was AWD, it used the multi-link for all wheels to accommodate ATTESA E-TS and was identified as "2.5 Club S-Four". In October 1997, a special trim package was offered called the 25 Club S 30th Anniversary released to commemorate Laurel's 30th anniversary, and was only painted in Red Pearl with 15" aluminum alloy wheels.

The all-new telematics in-car navigation system called Compass Link was installed as an extra-cost option in all trim packages beginning with this generation. Vehicles equipped were the Medalist NAVI Edition and subsequent special editions with the NAVI badge.

In March 2001, production at Murayama ended, and all production was transferred to Tochigi. In late 2002, Laurel's production ended after 35 years. The competitors were the Toyota Cresta and the Honda Inspire. It was replaced in 2003 by the Nissan Teana.

== See also ==
- Nissan Laurel Spirit
- Nissan Skyline - sister car
- Nissan Cefiro
- Nissan Teana - successor
- Toyota Mark II - competing model
- Nissan Note - the second-generation top version has reintroduced the "Medalist" badge
