= Nissan Elgrand =

Minivan produced by Nissan

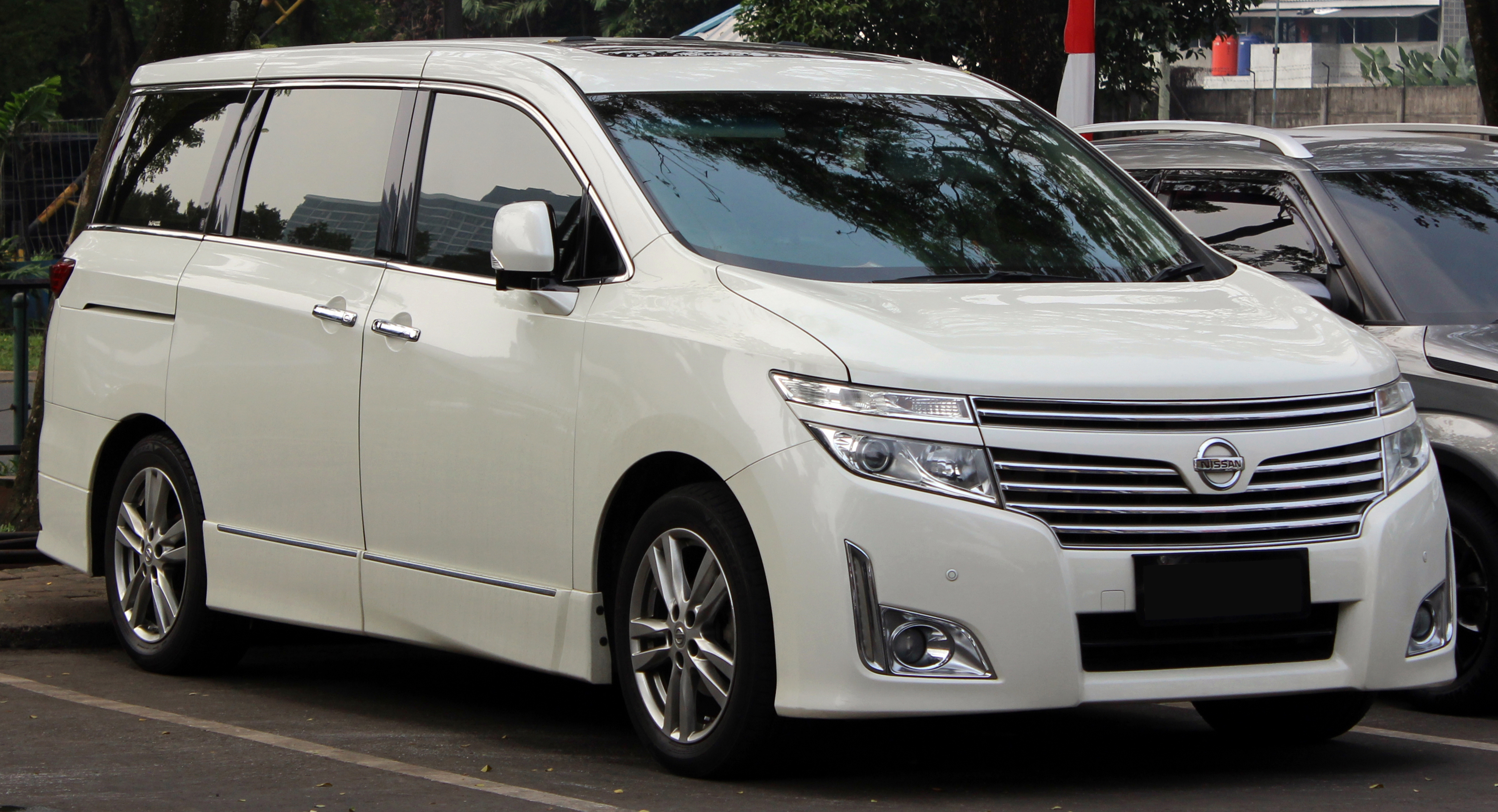
- 2013 Nissan Elgrand 3.5 Highway Star (E52)

Overview
- Manufacturer: Nissan
- Also called: Nissan Caravan Elgrand (1997–1999); Nissan Homy Elgrand (1997–1999); Isuzu Fargo Filly (1997–1999); Isuzu Filly (1999–2002)
- Production: 1997–present

Body and chassis
- Class: Minivan; Light commercial vehicle (E50, 1998–2017)
- Layout: Front-engine, rear-wheel-drive (1997–2010); Front-engine, front-wheel-drive (2010–2026); Front-engine, four-wheel-drive (1997–present)

Chronology
- Predecessor: Nissan Homy/Caravan; Nissan Presage

The Nissan Elgrand (Japanese: 日産・エルグランド, Hepburn: Nissan Erugurando) is a large MPV manufactured by Nissan Shatai for Nissan since 1997, available in fourth generations, with model codes E50 (1997–2002), E51 (2002–2010), E52 (2010–2026), and E53 (2026–present). The E50 Elgrand was also configured and produced as a light commercial vehicle from 1998 to 2017.

The Elgrand's main competitors are the Toyota Alphard/Vellfire, and the Honda Odyssey.

Since 2022, the Elgrand replaced the Fuga and Cima sedans as the company's flagship product range in their home market.

== First generation (E50; 1997) ==
First generation
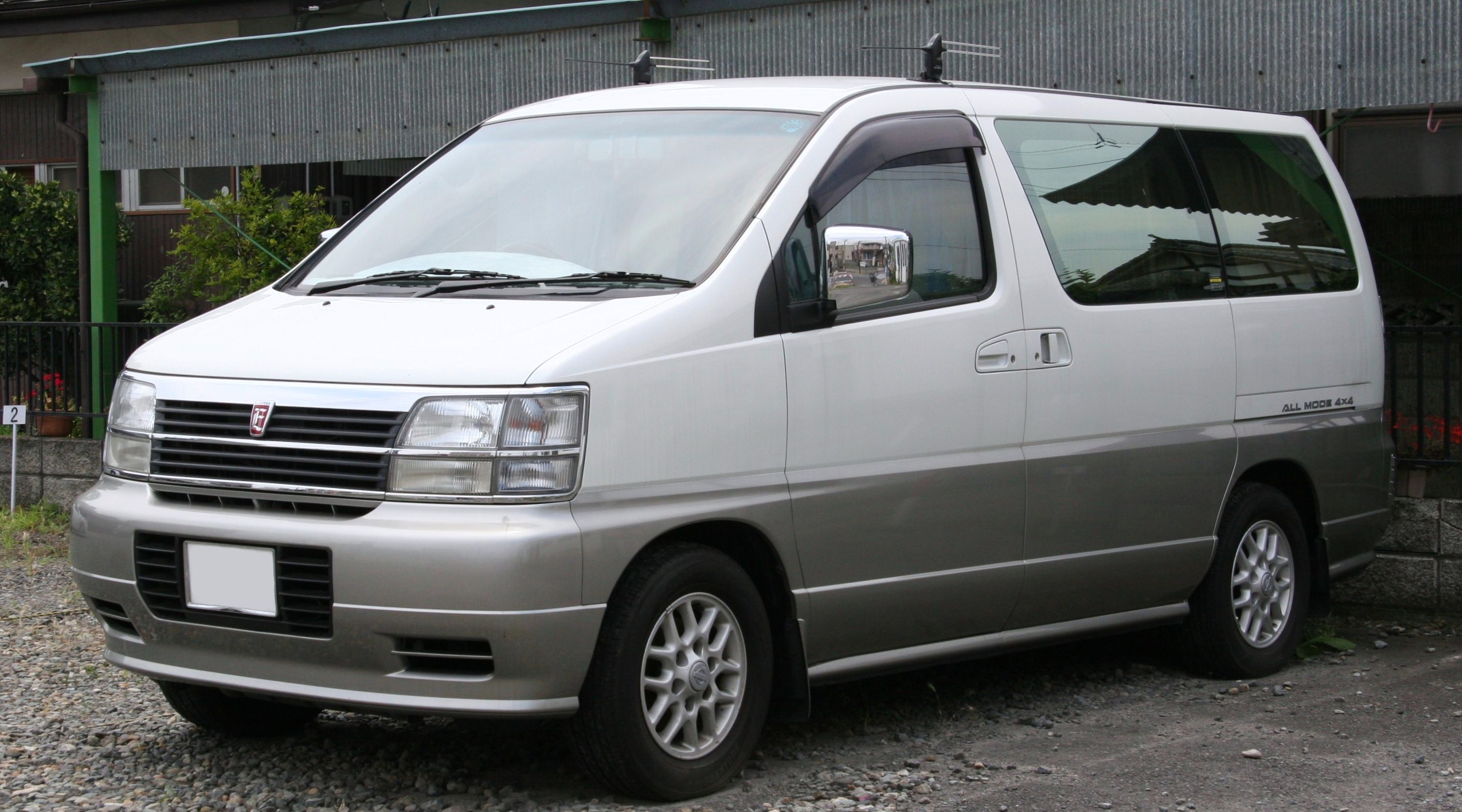

Overview
- Model code: E50
- Also called: Isuzu Fargo Filly; Isuzu Filly; Isuzu Super Medic II; Nissan Caravan Elgrand; Nissan Homy Elgrand; Nissan Paramedic
- Production: May 1997 – May 2002 (Elgrand); May 1998 – December 2017 (Paramedic); 2000–2011 (Jumbo Taxi)
- Assembly: Hiratsuka, Kanagawa (Nissan Shatai)

Body and chassis
- Body style: 4-door minivan 4-door van (commercial models)
- Layout: Front-engine, rear-wheel-drive Front-engine, four-wheel-drive

Powertrain
- Engine: 3.3 L VG33E V6; 3.5 L VQ35DE V6; 3.0 L ZD30DDTi I4 diesel turbo; 3.2 L QD32ETi I4 diesel turbo
- Transmission: 4-speed automatic

Dimensions
- Length: 4,740–4,775 mm (186.6–188.0 in); 5,640 mm (222.0 in) (Jumbo Taxi)
- Width: 1,775–1,800 mm (69.9–70.9 in); 1,900 mm (74.8 in) (Jumbo Taxi)
- Height: 1,940–1,955 mm (76.4–77.0 in); 2,480 mm (97.6 in) (Jumbo Taxi)
- Curb weight: 1,940–2,060 kg (4,277.0–4,541.5 lb); 2,030–2,180 kg (4,475.4–4,806.1 lb) (AWD)

Chronology
- Successor: Nissan Caravan (E26) (commercial models)

The first generation of the Nissan Elgrand was produced from May 1997 to May 2002, with commercial versions remaining in production until December 2017. Various engine combinations were available including the petrol VG33E, VQ35DE and diesel QD32ETi and ZD30DDTi. The E50 had a 4 speed automatic transmission and came in either 2- or 4-wheel drive. The Caravan Elgrand was exclusive to Nissan Store, while the Homy Elgrand was exclusive to Japanese Nissan Prince Store dealerships. The Elgrand assumed the Caravan Coach's passenger carrying duties with a luxury enhancement. The top trim level equipment packages were installed with internet enabled satellite navigation called CarWings.

In August 1999, a minor facelift occurred. The Homy and Caravan nameplate was dropped.

The Elgrand received a facelift on 23 August 2000. Featuring a slightly redesigned front fascia and revised headlights.

The E50 version of the Elgrand came in several trim levels including: V, VG, X, XL, Highway Star, Rider, and S Edition.

=== Model variations ===
Isuzu Fargo Filly

From 1997 to 2002, the E50 Elgrand was rebadged and sold by Isuzu as the Fargo Filly in the Japanese market.

On 4 April 2013, two Fargo Filly vans were subjected to recalls due to issues regarding the durability of the battery cable's plastic band, which causes it to touch the exhaust tube when it breaks to potentially cause a short circuit. On February 19, 2016, 15 Fargo Filly vans made between January 1999 and December 2001 were subjected to recalls due to engine issues that prevent the driver from starting it.

Nissan Paramedic and Isuzu Super Medic II

In May 1998, the second generation Nissan Paramedic ambulance was introduced on the E50 Elgrand chassis. To facilitate ambulance use, the body of the E50 Paramedic from the B pillar rearward was carried over from the Paramedic II, a high-roof ambulance version of the E24 Caravan, to increase interior space in the rear of the ambulance. The E50 Paramedic was facelifted in 2006 and remained in production until December 2017, when it was replaced by a third generation based on the E26 NV350 Caravan.

The E50 Paramedic was also marketed by Isuzu as the Super Medic II until 2002.

On 4 April 2013, 12 Fargo Filly vans were subjected to recalls due to issues regarding the durability of the battery cable's plastic band is not durable, which causes it to touch the exhaust tube when it breaks to potentially cause a short circuit. On February 19, 2016, 15 Super Medic II vans made between January 1999 and December 2001 were subjected to recalls due to engine issues that prevent the driver from starting it.

Elgrand Jumbo Taxi

Between 2000 and 2011, a 10-passenger commercial van based on the E50 Paramedic was offered under the Elgrand Jumbo Taxi nameplate.

=== Gallery ===
Elgrand

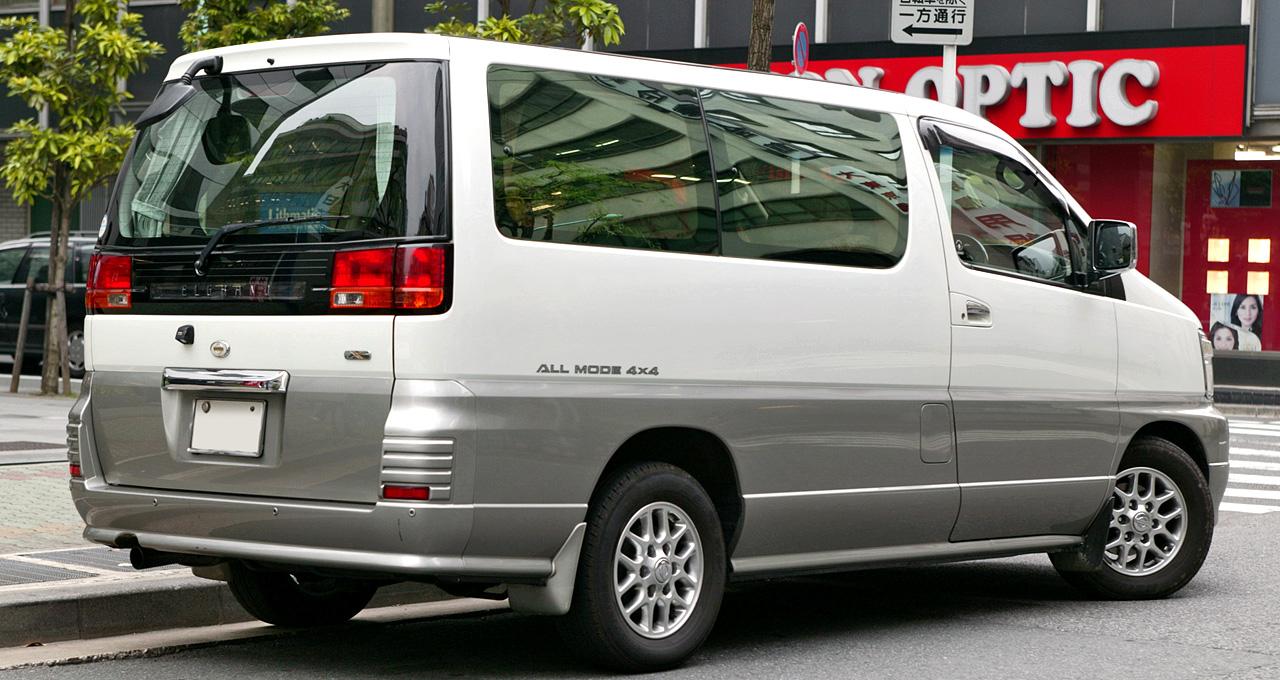
Nissan Elgrand rear view(E50)

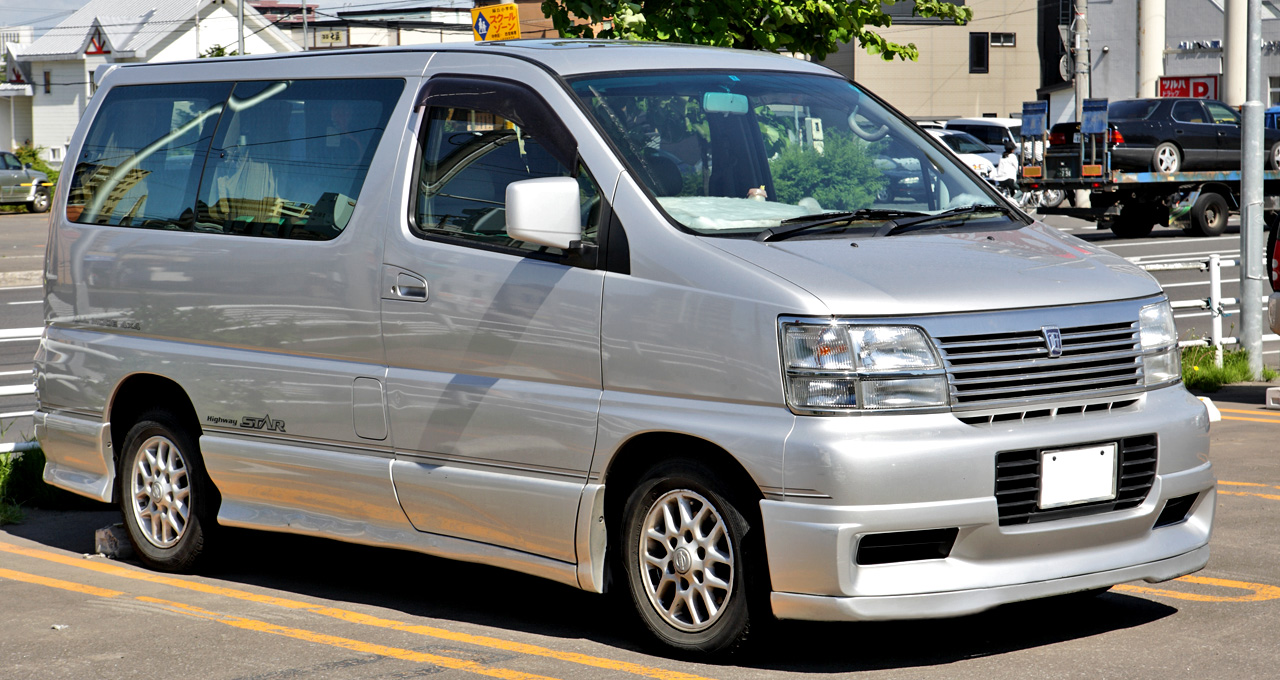
Nissan Elgrand Highway Star (E50)

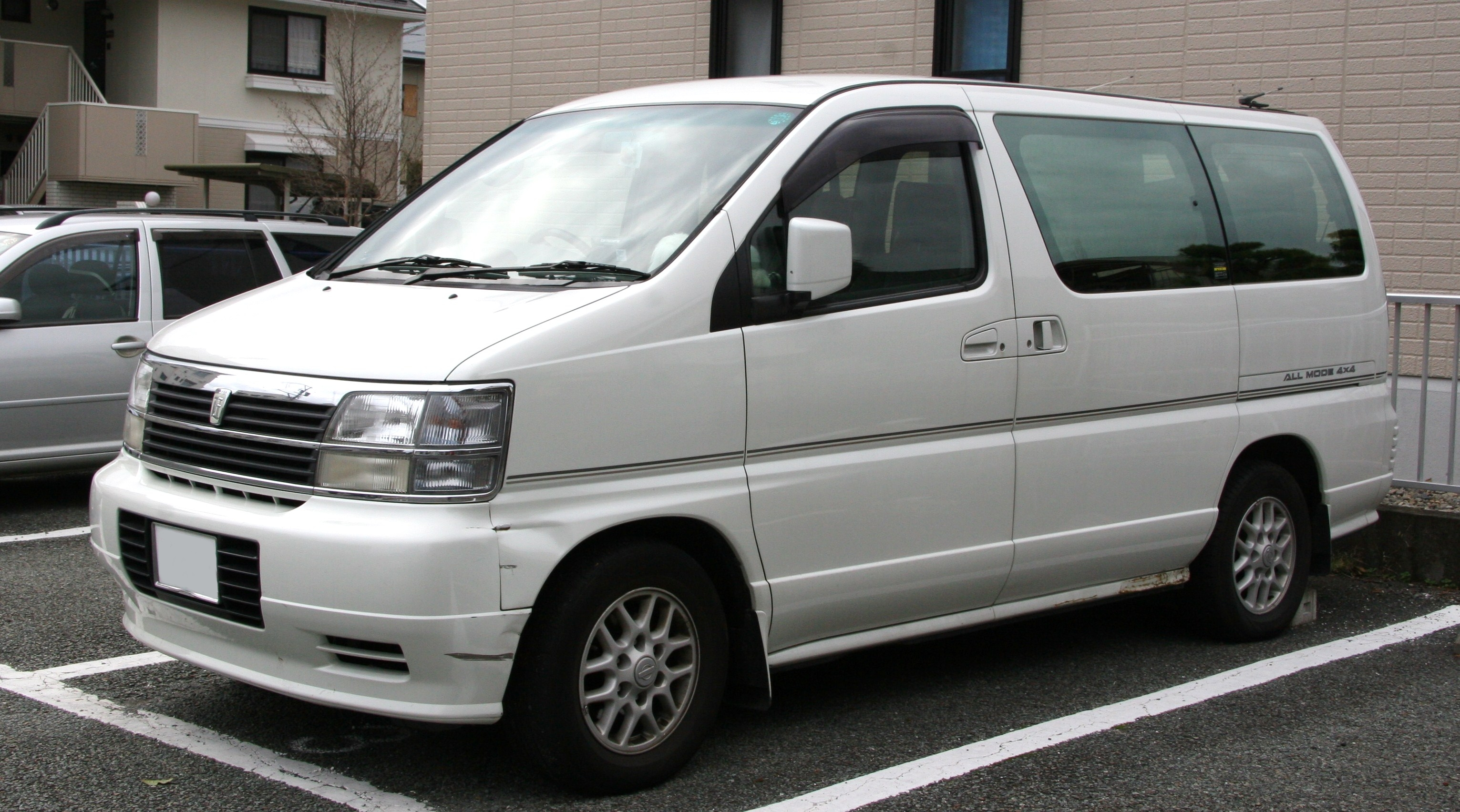
1999 minor facelift

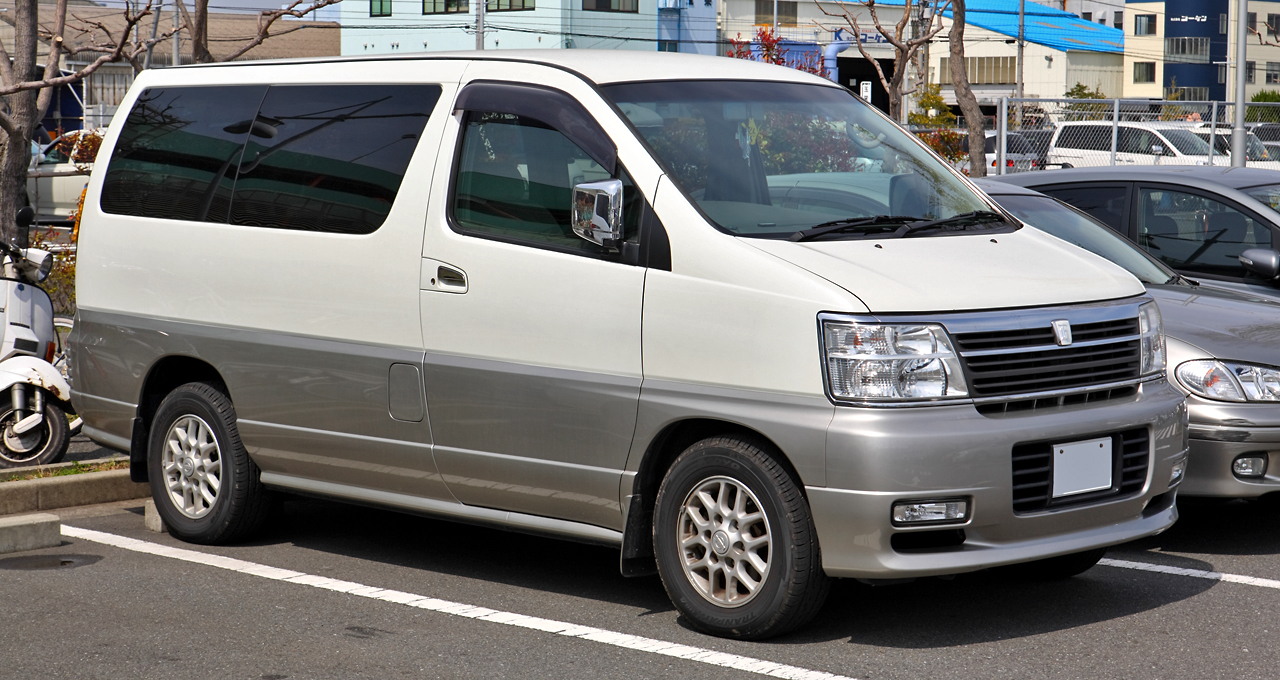
2000–2002 facelift

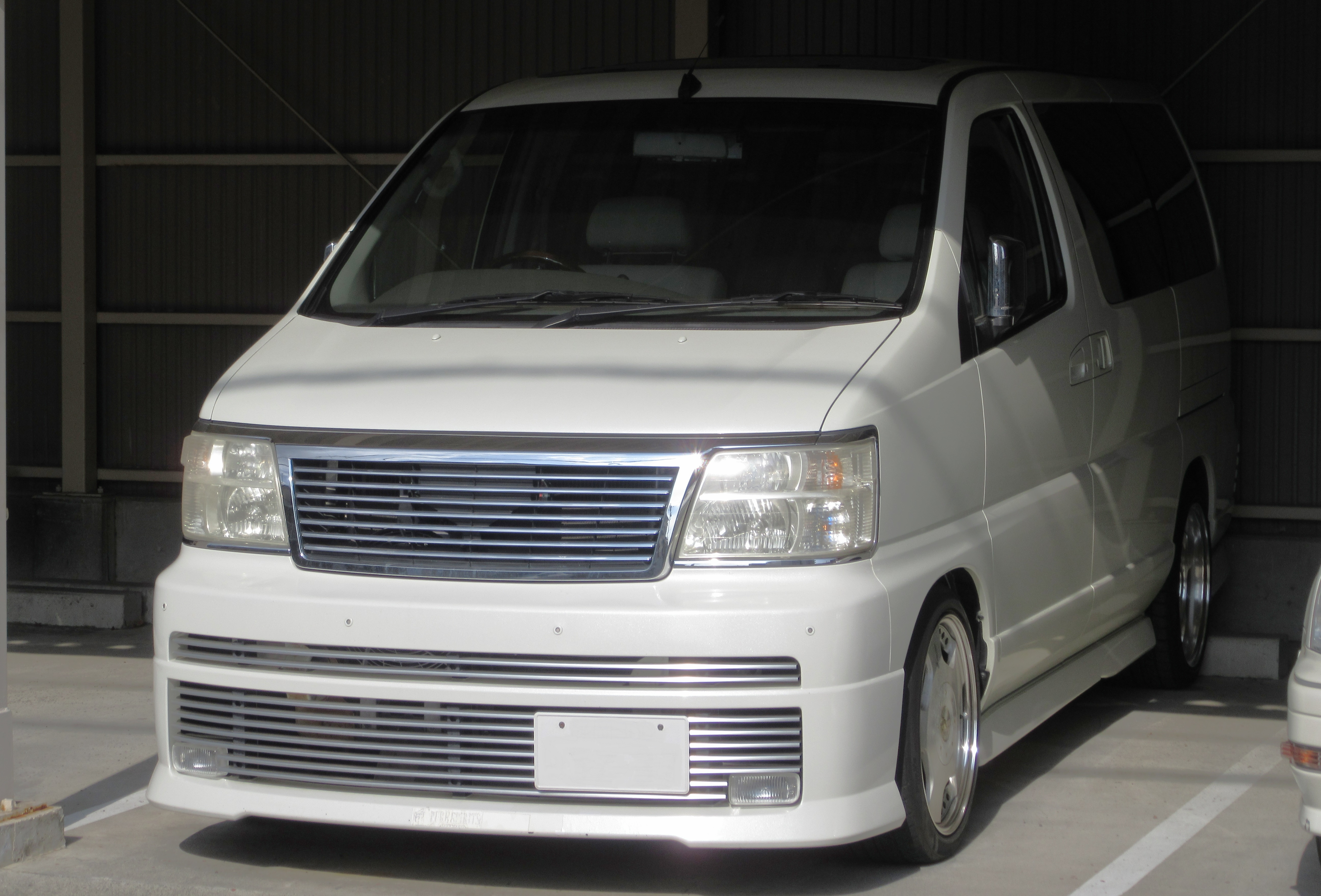
Nissan Elgrand Rider

Isuzu Filly

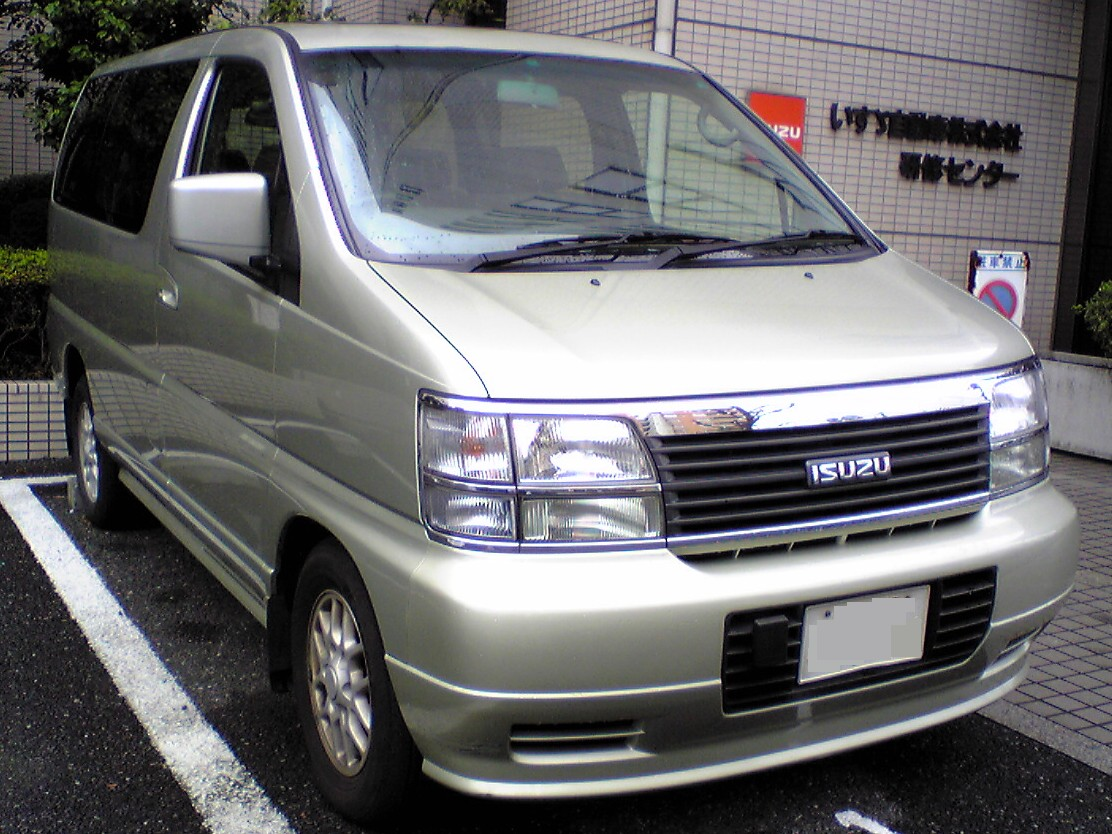
Isuzu Fargo Filly (Japan)

Nissan Elgrand Jumbo Taxi

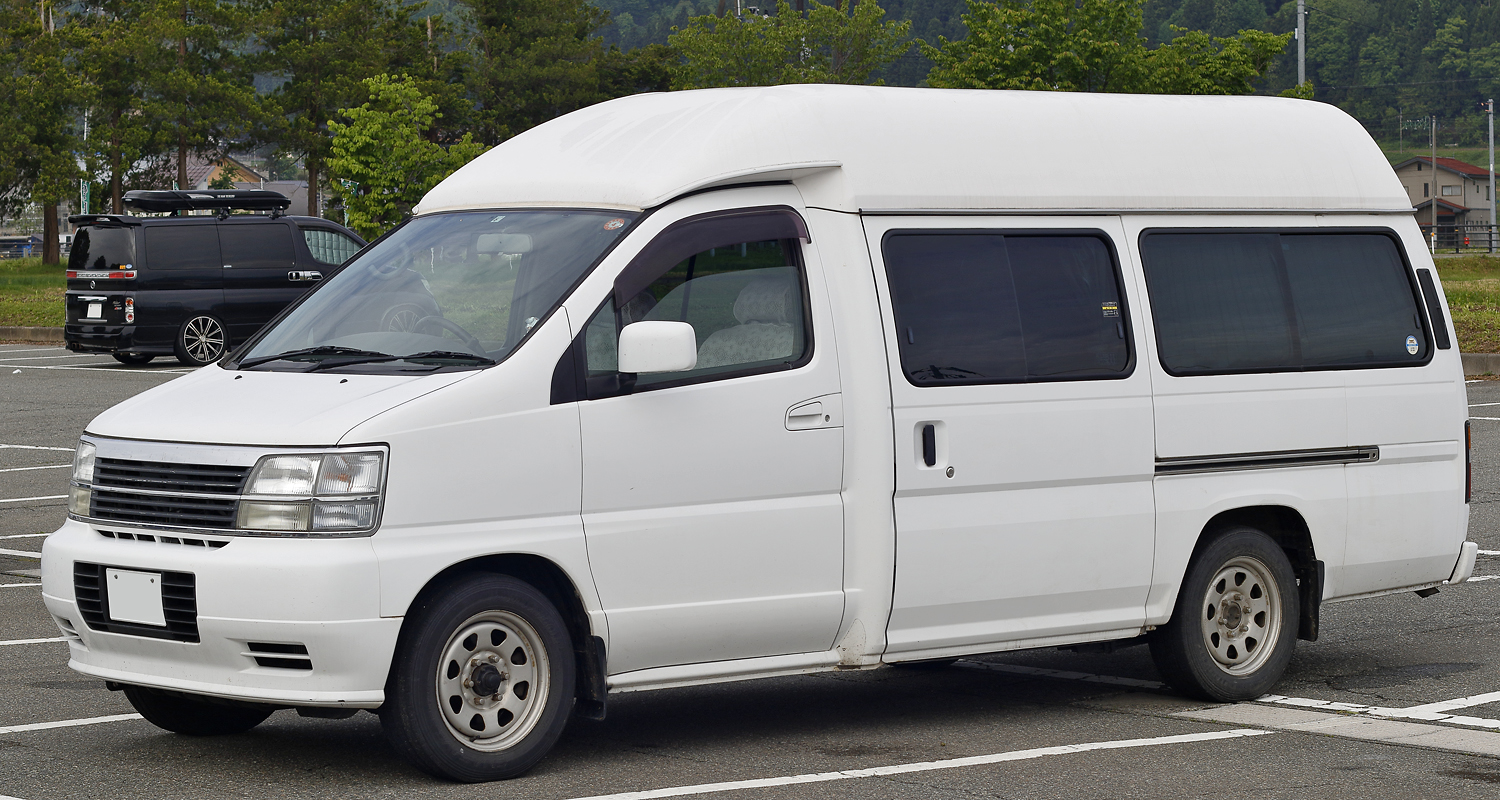
Nissan Elgrand Jumbo Taxi (E50)

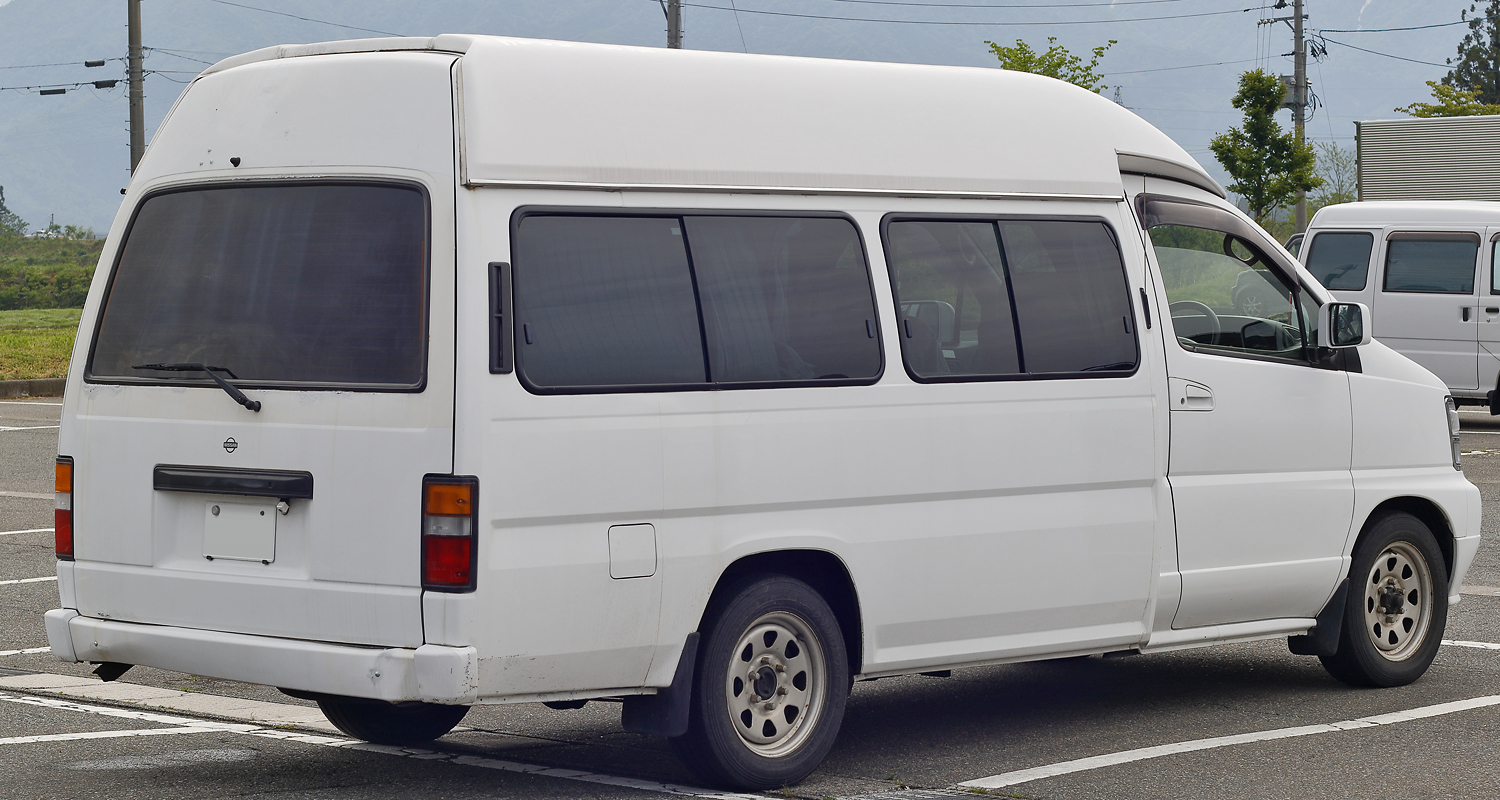
Nissan Elgrand Jumbo Taxi (E50)

Nissan Paramedic

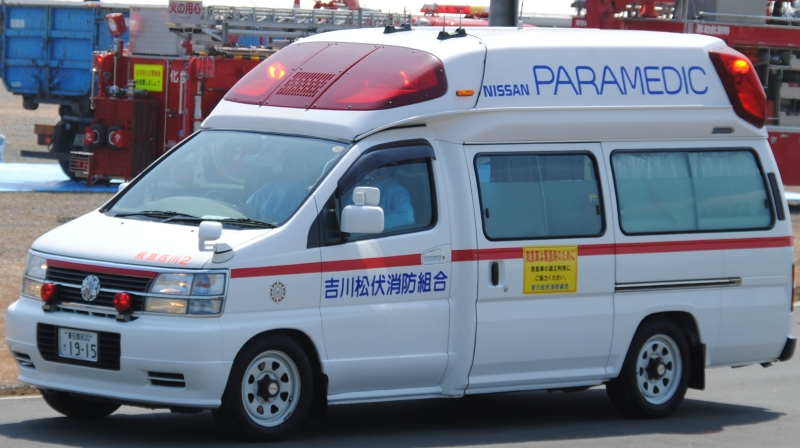
Pre-facelift Nissan Paramedic (E50)

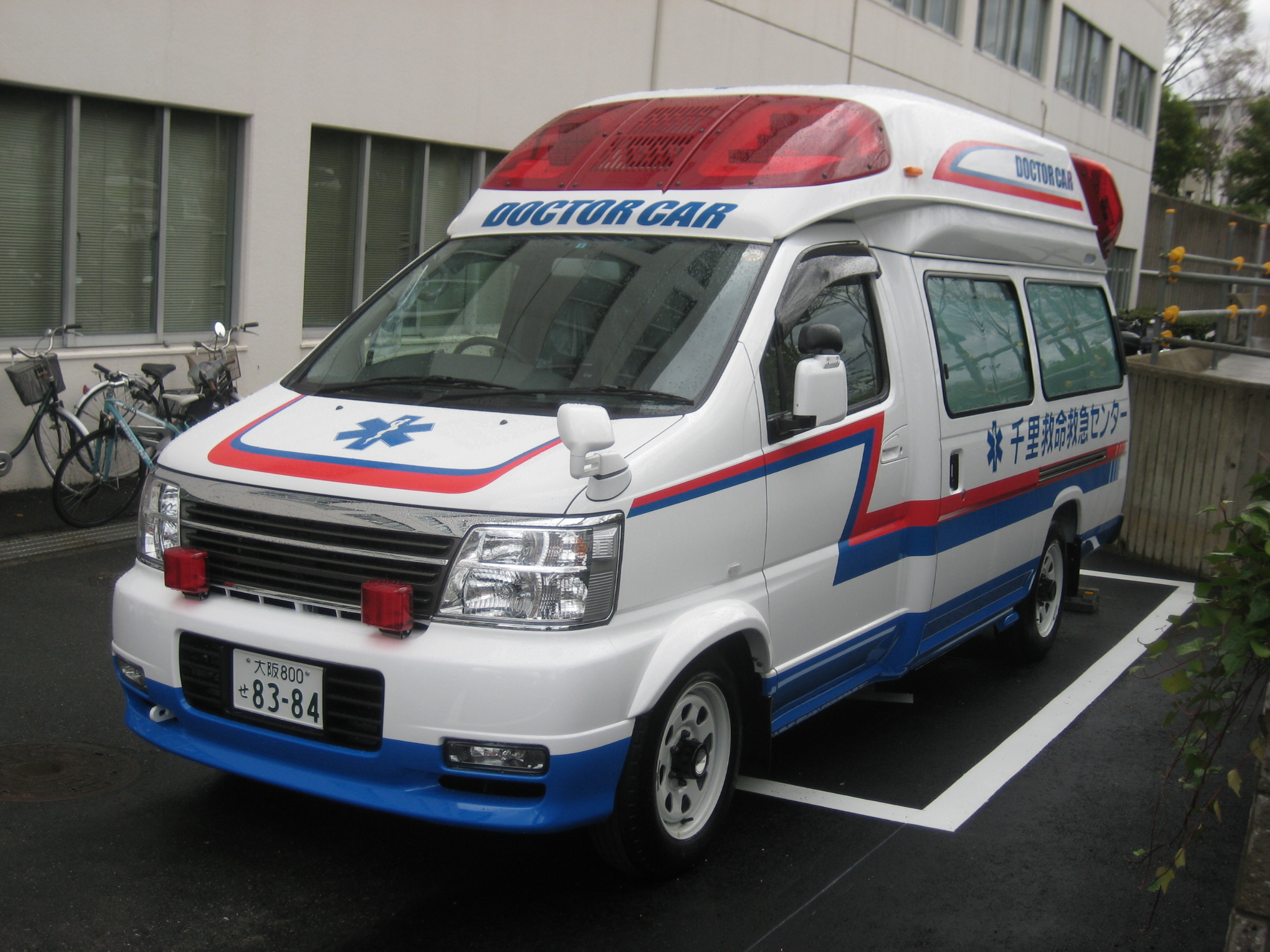
Facelift Nissan Paramedic (E50)

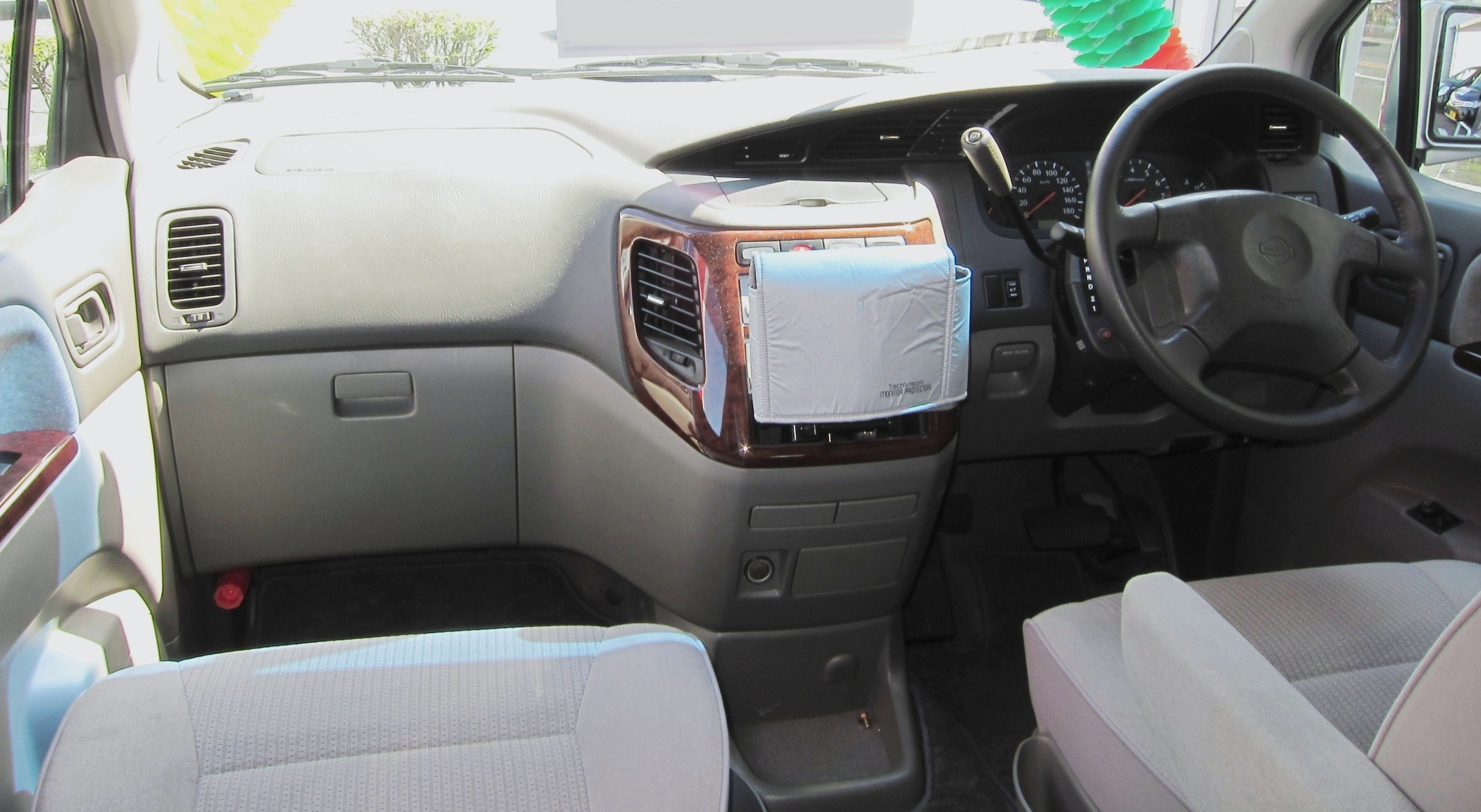
Interior

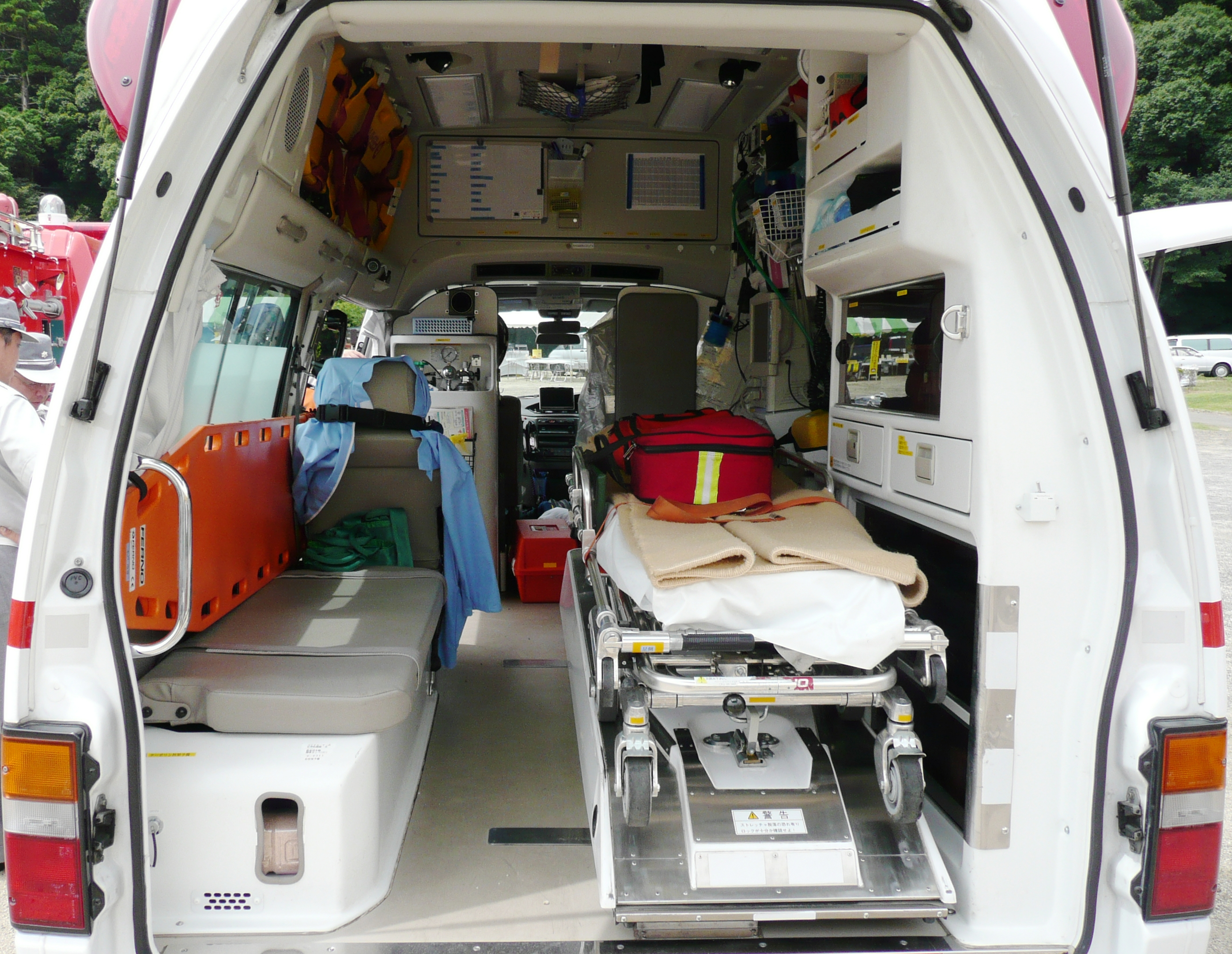
Ambulance interior

== Second generation (E51; 2002) ==
Second generation
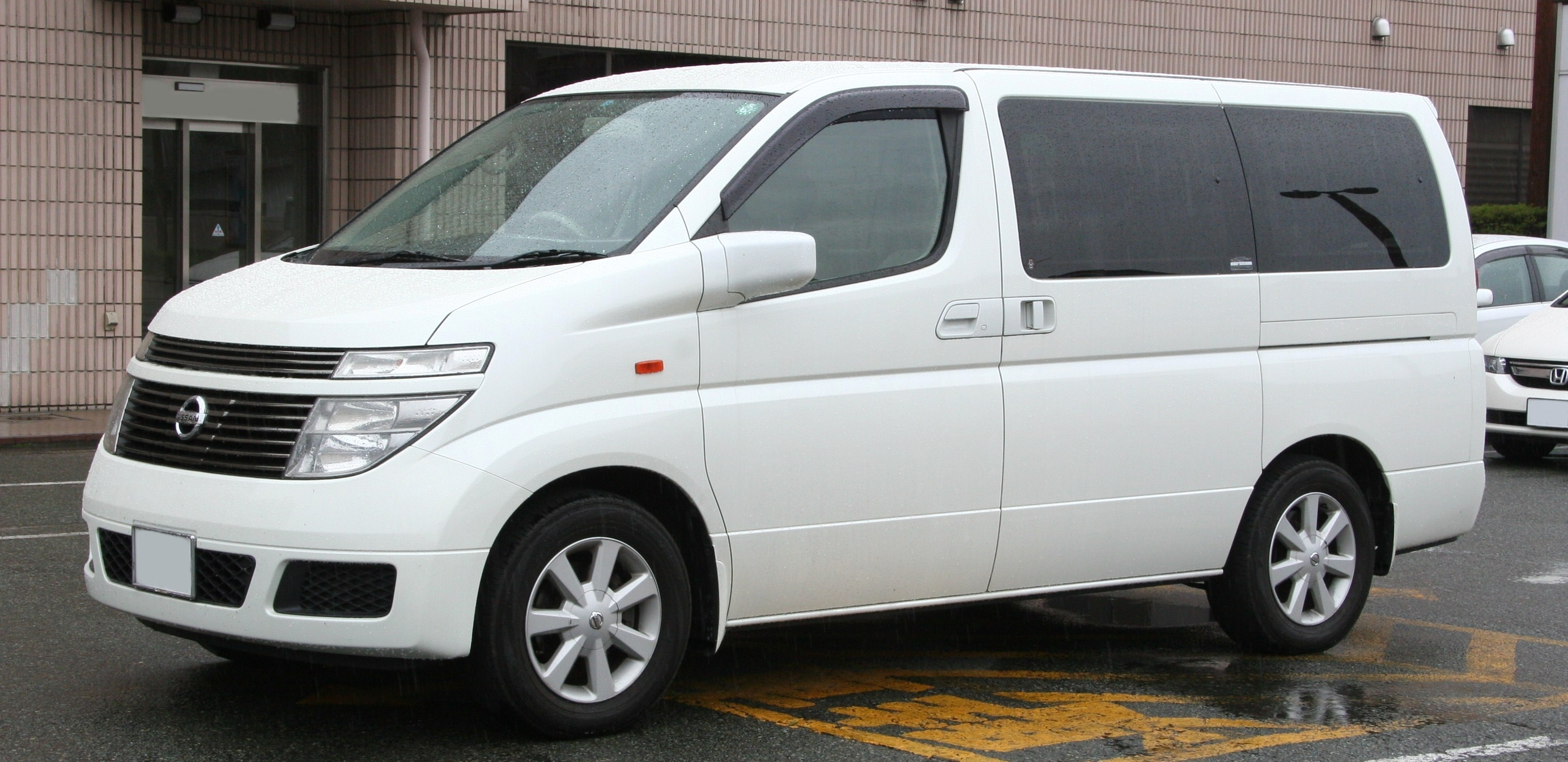
- Pre-facelift Nissan Elgrand E51 (Japan)

Overview
- Model code: E51
- Production: May 2002– August 2010
- Assembly: Hiratsuka, Kanagawa (Nissan Shatai)

Body and chassis
- Body style: 4/5-door minivan
- Layout: Front-engine, rear-wheel-drive Front-engine, four-wheel-drive
- Platform: Modified Nissan FM platform

Powertrain
- Engine: 2.5 L VQ25DE V6; 3.5 L VQ35DE V6
- Transmission: 5-speed automatic with manumatic shifting RE5R05A (VQ35DE)

Dimensions
- Wheelbase: 2,950 mm (116.1 in)
- Length: 4,835 mm (190.4 in)
- Width: 1,795 mm (70.7 in) (XL) / 1,815 mm (71.5 in) (HWS)
- Height: 1,920 mm (75.6 in) (XL) / 1,910 mm (75.2 in) (HWS)

The second generation E51 Elgrand was launched in May 2002 and primarily competes with the Toyota Alphard and Honda Elysion. The Jumbo Taxi and Paramedic did not move to the new platform, instead remaining on the previous E50 chassis. In addition, the rebadged Isuzu Filly was not carried over. The E51 Elgrand is quite different from its predecessor, now equipped with power sliding doors, turn signal repeaters built into the side mirrors, a rear roof spoiler, and 16- (XL) or 17-inch (HWS) aluminum alloy wheels. The new front fascia, with a chromed grille, gives the Elgrand a sportier look. The E51 was only available through Nissan dealerships in Japan, with limited exports to Hong Kong and Brunei. The E51 is a popular grey import vehicle in Australia, the United Kingdom, Canada, and New Zealand.

The E51 Elgrand uses either the 2.5l or 3.5l V6 VQ-series engine combined with a five-speed automatic transmission with Tiptronic shift for better response. Additional transmission controls include Power and Snow settings, as well as a four-wheel drive option. It employs a multilink rear suspension with ventilated disc brakes all around.

The Elgrand went on sale on 21 May 2002. Early Nissan Elgrand models include XL, X, VG (4/5-doors), V, and Highway Star

Interior features include captain-style seats, an eight-speaker sound system with an optional nine-speaker system by Bose Corp., and a TV/DVD player with a 9-inch (230 mm) screen. The Elgrand is also equipped with an eight-inch (203mm) LCD monitor in the dashboard for the Carwings Vehicle Information System (also known as VIS). Optional extras include heated front seats, power curtains and finer levels of interior trim, such as woodgrain trim panels and a woodgrain steering wheel. The interior seating arrangement can be configured for dining by adjusting the front captain-style seats facing the back, and folding the second row of seats flat onto the seat cushions.

Like most newer models produced by Nissan, the Elgrand comes with the "Keyless-go" feature for enhanced user convenience. Higher spec Elgrands like the Highway Star, Rider, X, and XL versions come with an internal GPS system dedicated for use in Japan. An optional GPS system for Hong Kong and Guangdong Province in China was available. The GPS system was not a satellite-based system, but a disc-operated CarWings system that played off a concealed DVD player via tracking the position of the vehicle via wheel sensors, against an inputted start and end position of a journey with high accuracy. CD Discs were only ever created for Japan and direct export countries.

But alongside this was the innovation of reversing camera with turning guidance lines, lane control and assisted braking. In 2008 this was updated to a four-view camera technology that provided an aerial all-round view when reversing. Other innovations including voice-activated controls, BOSE Audio or 5.1 channel surround sound audio systems, auto voice-activated phone calls, and a satellite controlled clock.

Options included cruise control, a multi-deck CD-player and BOSE all round 9-speaker stereo, as well as a TV set in the rear with a 7" LCD screen. There were also several windshield options available, ranging from a standard type through to a water repellent, laser-etched, tinted screen. The water repellent screens have a holographic sticker to identify this additional option.

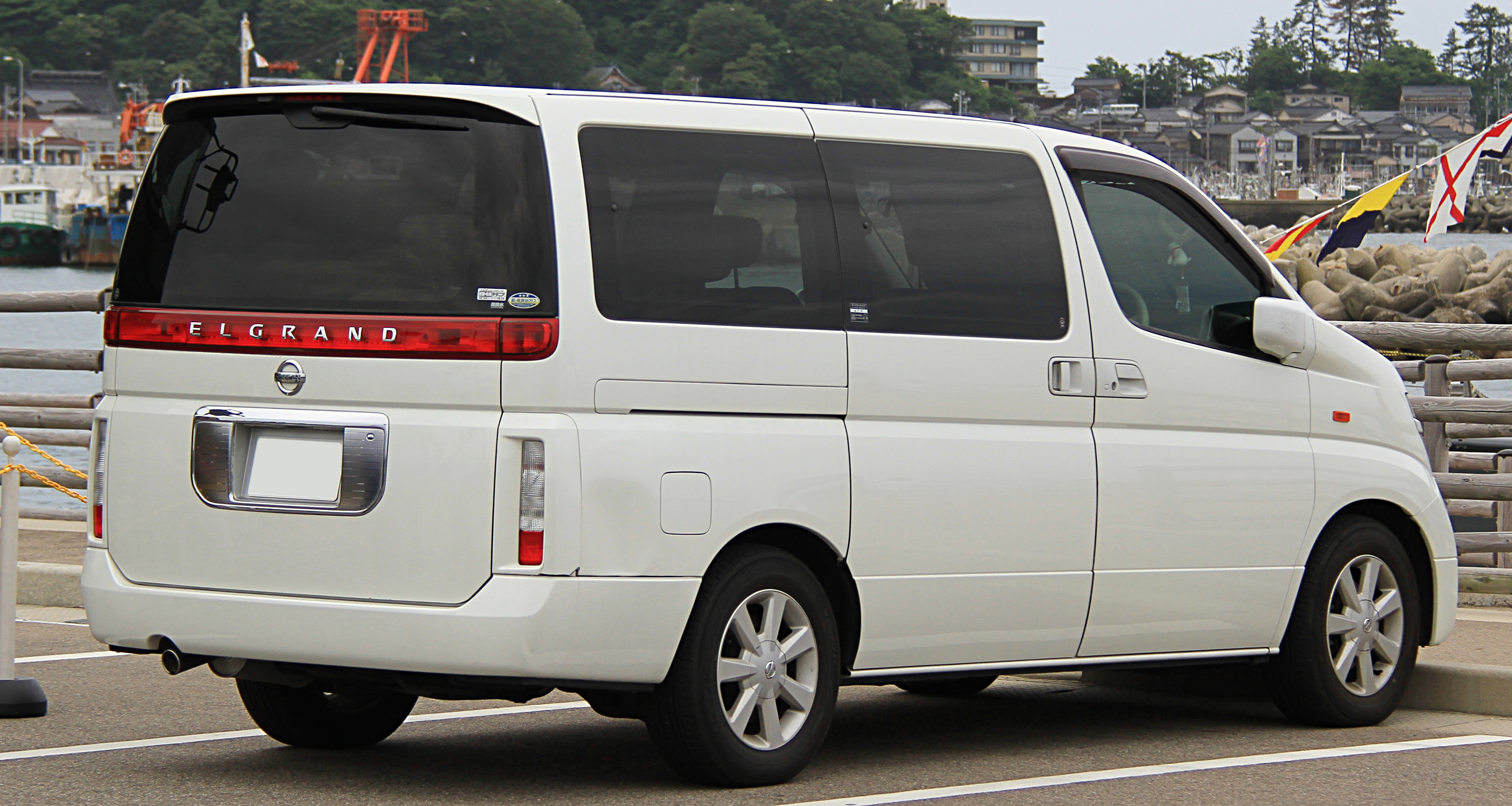
Pre-facelift Nissan Elgrand E51 (Japan)

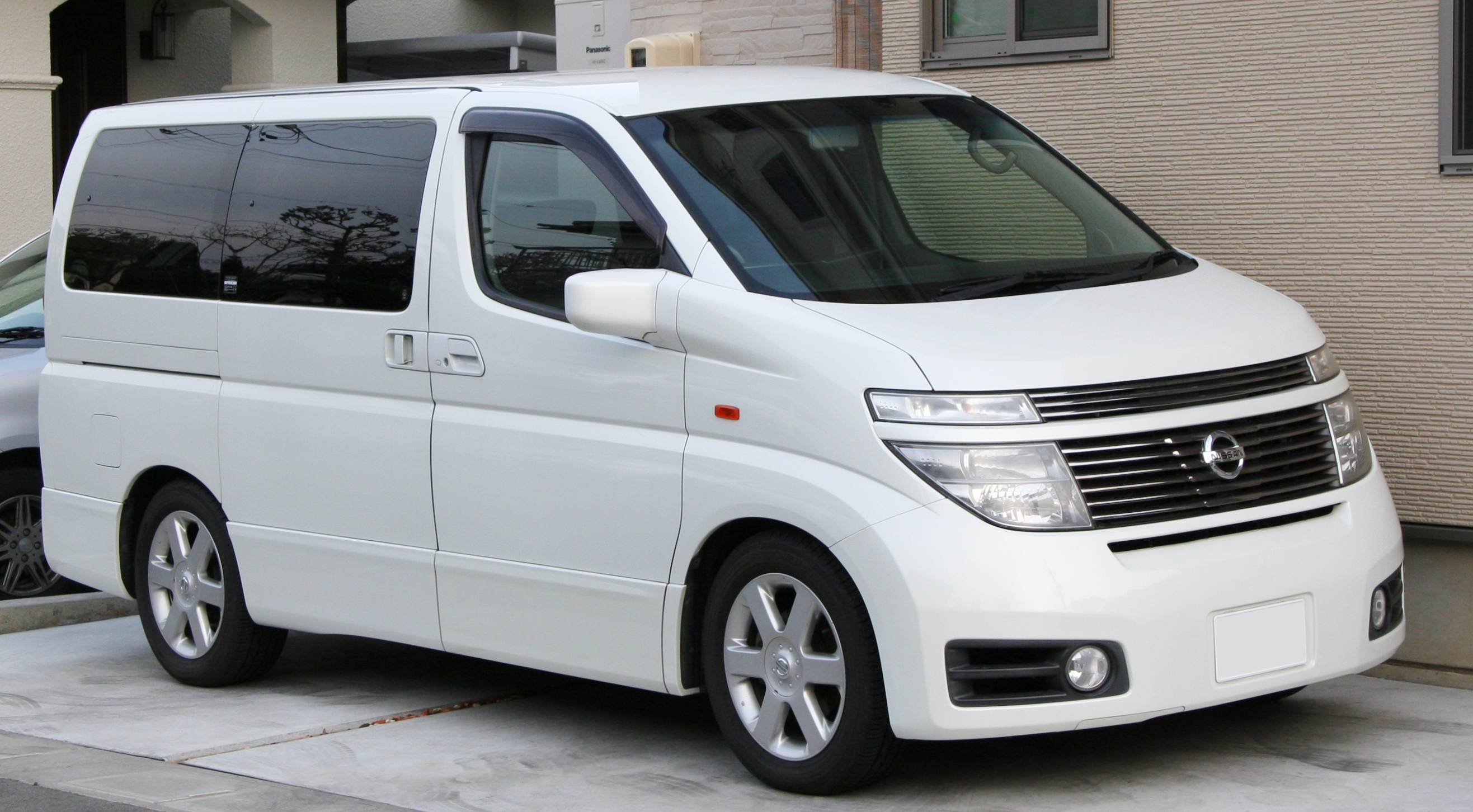
Pre-facelift Nissan Elgrand E51 Highway Star (Japan)

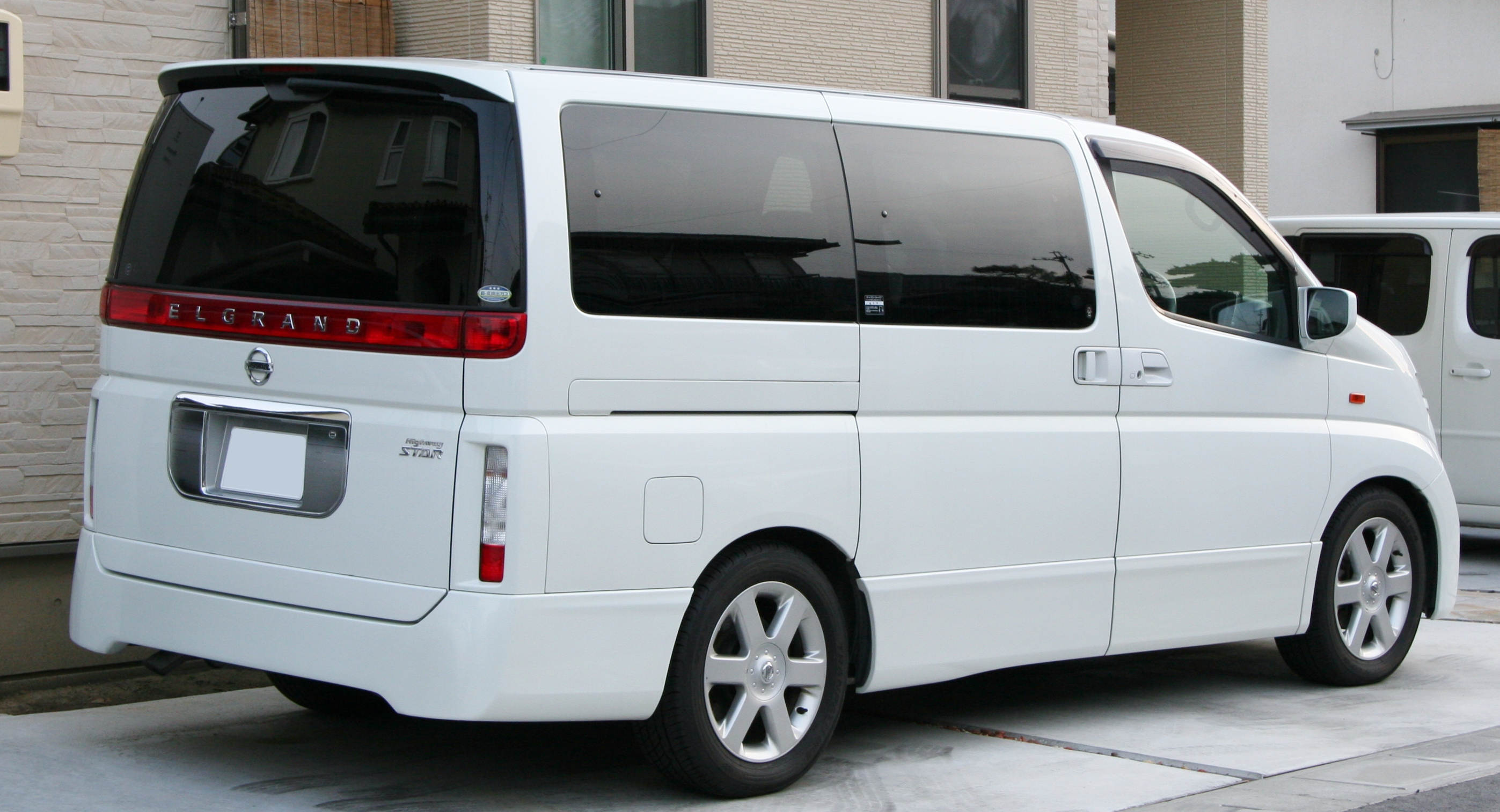
Pre-facelift Nissan Elgrand E51 Highway Star (Japan)

Interior of the 2003 (E51 pre-facelift) Elgrand, with LCD screen.

The model specifications were V, VG, X, and X. Later releases added the Highway Star and Rider versions. The bottom specification model was the V, whereas the top specification vehicle was the XL, with full leather interior. The 2006 refresh saw the discontinuation of the VG model.

The Rider had two variations including an Autech Tuned Nismo version.

=== Variants ===
==== Nissan Elgrand, Autech Elgrand Enchante ====
The early Elgrand Enchant models included VG, V, and Highway Star. All model ranges can be configured with a removable second-row seat or Step Type.

==== Elgrand XL ====
This was the top of the range model, with many additional options fitted as standard. It came with a full leather 7-seat interior, 8 speaker sound system, which included Sony MiniDISC, keyless entry, Carwings, reversing camera, two TV screens, folding wing mirrors and heated driver and passenger seats.

Out of the complete range of Elgrand, this was also very heavy at 2.2 tons. Rider versions being the lightest version as it was originally conceived as a sports model, so had a lot of the additional features removed in view of reducing the weight/power ratio for the vehicle.

==== Elgrand Rider ====
The Rider was a version of the Elgrand VG 5-door with front bumper was changed, front fog lamp, side sill protector, rear under protector, rear upper combination lamp, rear winker finisher, clear side turn lamp, leather-lined interior, Rider sound system (MD/CD integrated AM/FM electronic tuner radio, 6 speakers and subwoofer), 17-inch aluminum road wheels, 215/60R17 tires, large-diameter sports muffler by Fujitsubo, and low-height suspension. The Rider went on sale on 2 October 2002.

The Autech Rider S is sporty version from the 8-passenger Elgrand Rider with the front and rear bumper design was slightly changed, and the design of the special finisher was changed. The Elgrand Rider S went on sale on 22 October 2003.

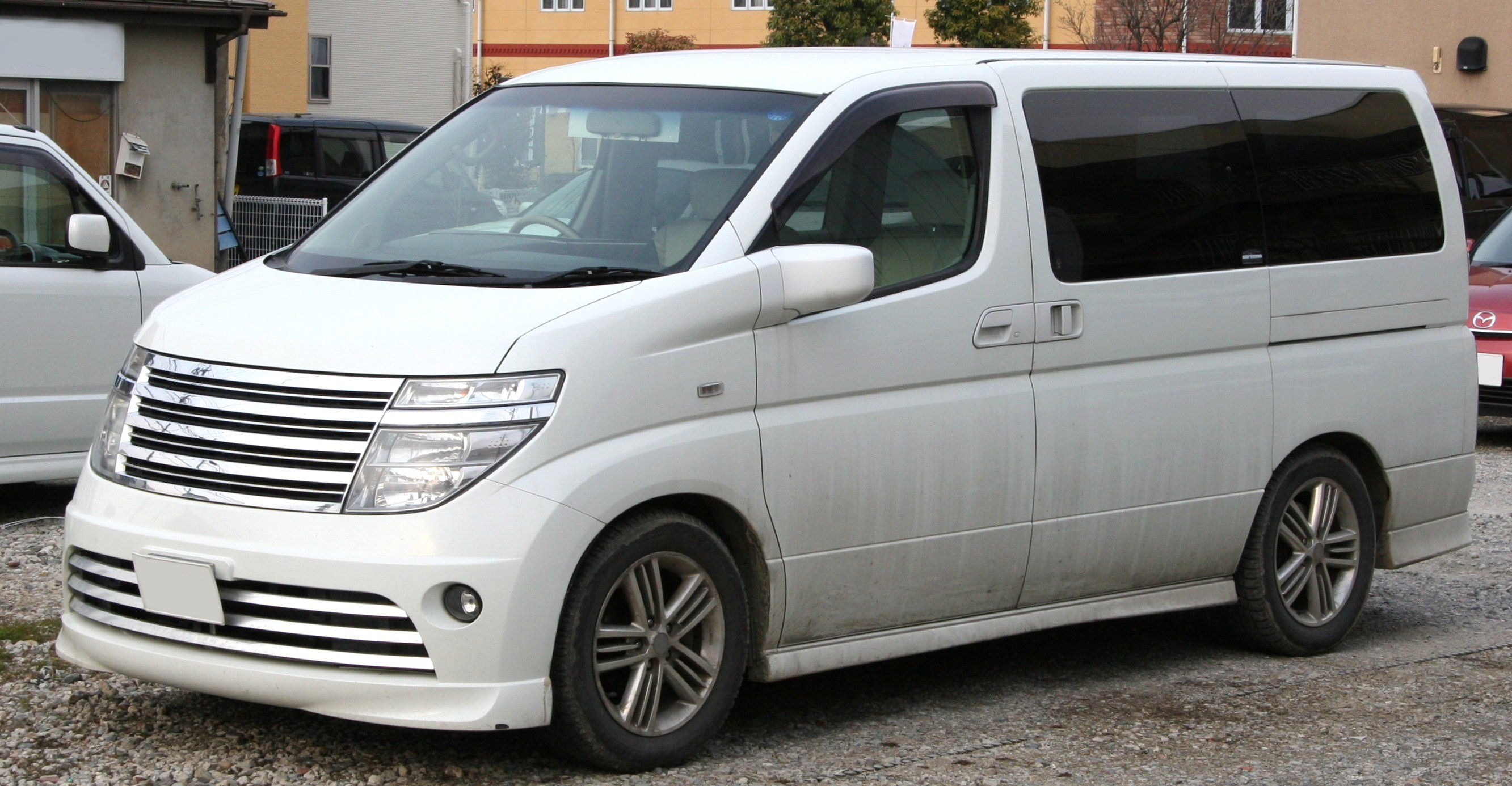
Pre-facelift Nissan Elgrand Rider (Japan)

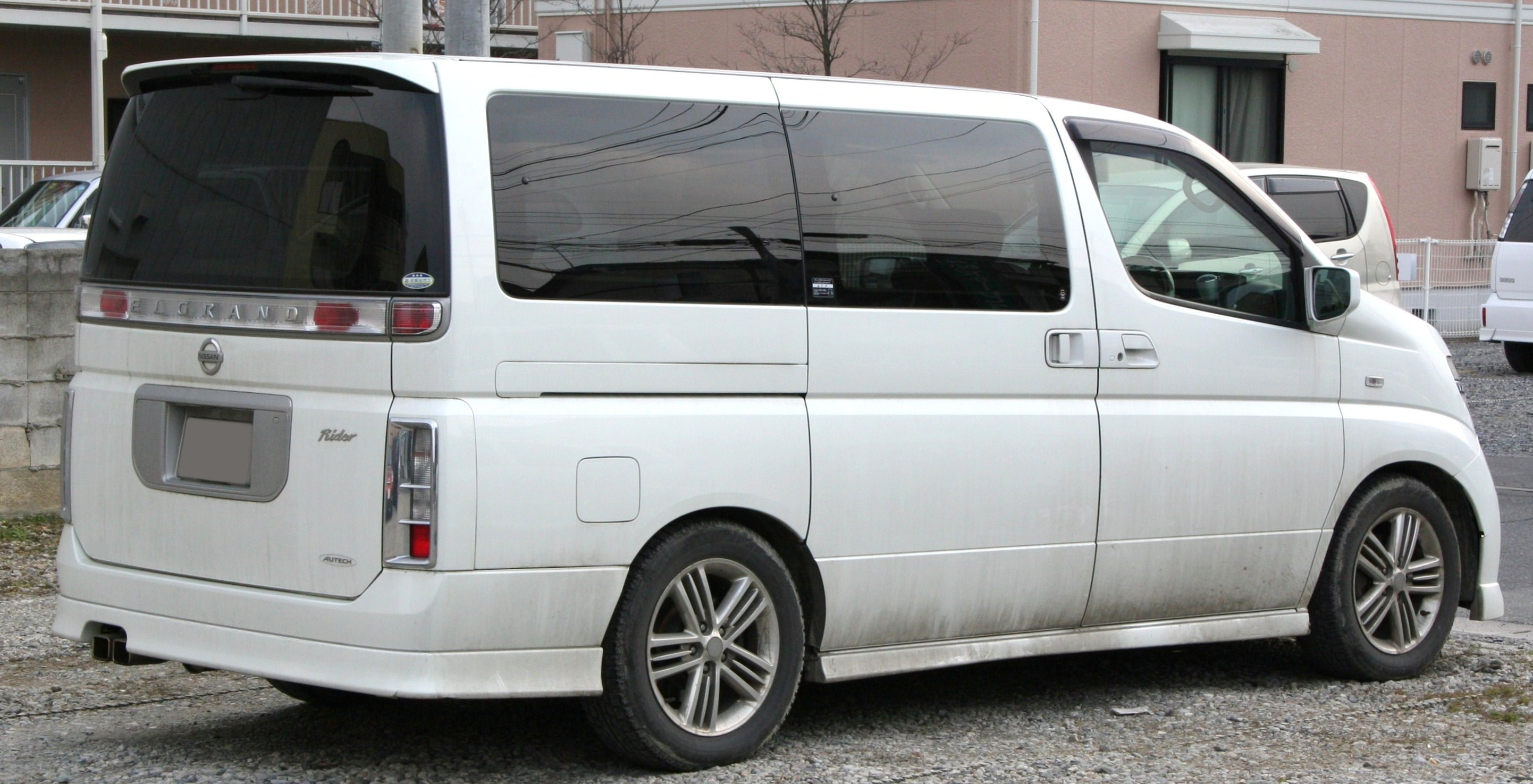
Rear view (pre-facelift))

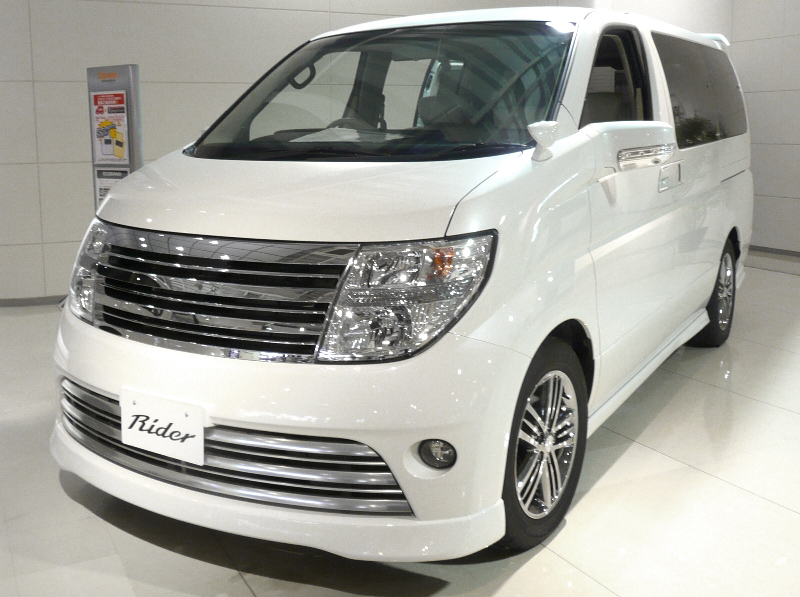
Elgrand Rider (first facelift)

==== Autech Elgrand VIP ====
It is a version of Elgrand XL 4-seat with leather-wrapped rear seat with centre armrest, electric slide step, trunk board with partition board, second seat long slide rail, rear-seat reading lamp with room lamp, rear-seat audio system (VHS+CD+DVD), electric ottoman, rear-seat audio speaker (6 speakers), electric outlet (AC100V, 100W), front cabinet, floor carpet, drawn-out table, black body colour.

JDM models went on sale on 19 December 2002.

==== VG version L, Highway Star version L (2002–2003) ====
VG version L and Highway Star version L are versions of the Nissan Elgrand VG and Highway Star, respectively, commemorating the sale of 250,000 units of the Nissan Elgrand in Japan since May 1997. Changes include a Carwings DVD TV/navigation system, 2 Intelligent Keys (driver side, passenger side, back door sensor), rear-view camera with car width and distance display (colour), Elgrand super sound system and 6 speakers (MD/CD integrated AM/FM electronic tuner radio, 160W, MD/CD autochanger connection), steering wheel controls for the audio, voice command, and hands-free phone, choice of 3 body colours: Champagne silver titan metallic, white pearl (3-coat pearl), black/sparkling silver metallic in VG version L; white pearl (3-coat pearl), sword metal metallic, diamond silver metallic in Highway Star version L.

JDM models went on sale between 24 December 2002 and 31 March 2003.

==== Elgrand Highway Star update, Elgrand Enchante front row passenger Lift Seat Type (2003–2010) ====
Change to Elgrand Highway Star include fully plated front grille, chrome colour coat aluminum road wheel, fog lamp surround in body colour, black steering wheel, suede tone cross-section seat floor Jacquard material in black, shift knob leather section in black, instrument panel centre cluster control panel in dark grey. New options include driver seat auto slide door for an intelligent key model, leather or Supplier (from Elgrand X)-upholstered seat.

==== Elgrand Enchant (2003) ====
The Elgrand Enchant takes 8-passenger versions of the Elgrand V, VG, Highway Star, and X, and adds a mobility access seat in the second row.

JDM models went on sale on 27 August 2003.

=== 2004 first facelift ===
The facelifted Elgrand went to sale in August 2004, the front grille and headlight units were integrated, the rear bumper and lighting designs were revised, and door mirrors with integrated turn signals became standard equipment. The rear combination lamps were separated into taillights and brake lights, and the brake lights were converted to LEDs. The interior was reshaped, with the instrument panel and dashboard, woodgrain panels in various parts, a fine vision meter with an illuminated ring, and chrome-plated switches. The facelifted Elgrand 2.5 available in the standard V model and the Highway Star equipped with aero parts, as well as the Autech's Rider and Rider S models. The facelifted Elgrand went on sale on 25 August 2004.

The Elgrand models with 2.5-litre VQ25DE engine was added in December 2004 included V (8-seat), Highway Star (8-seat).

The updated Elgrand Enchante was unveiled at the 2004 Tokyo Motor Show.

=== 2007 second facelift ===
Nissan announced the elgrand facelift and went on sale in October 2007. The Highway Star received a new design, adding a body-colored line to the center of the front grille. The "Around View Monitor" is as optional equipment on all variant.

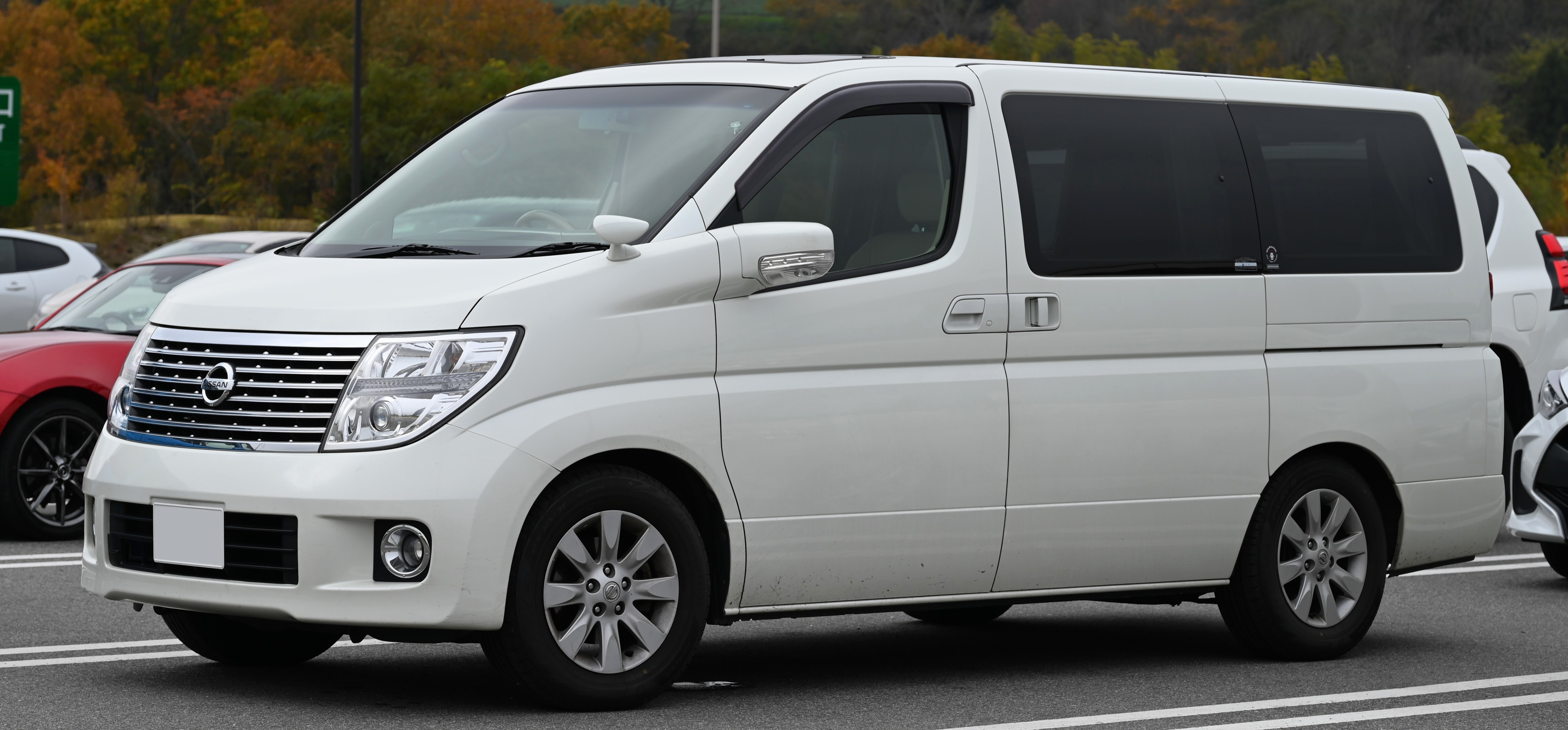
Facelift Nissan Elgrand E51

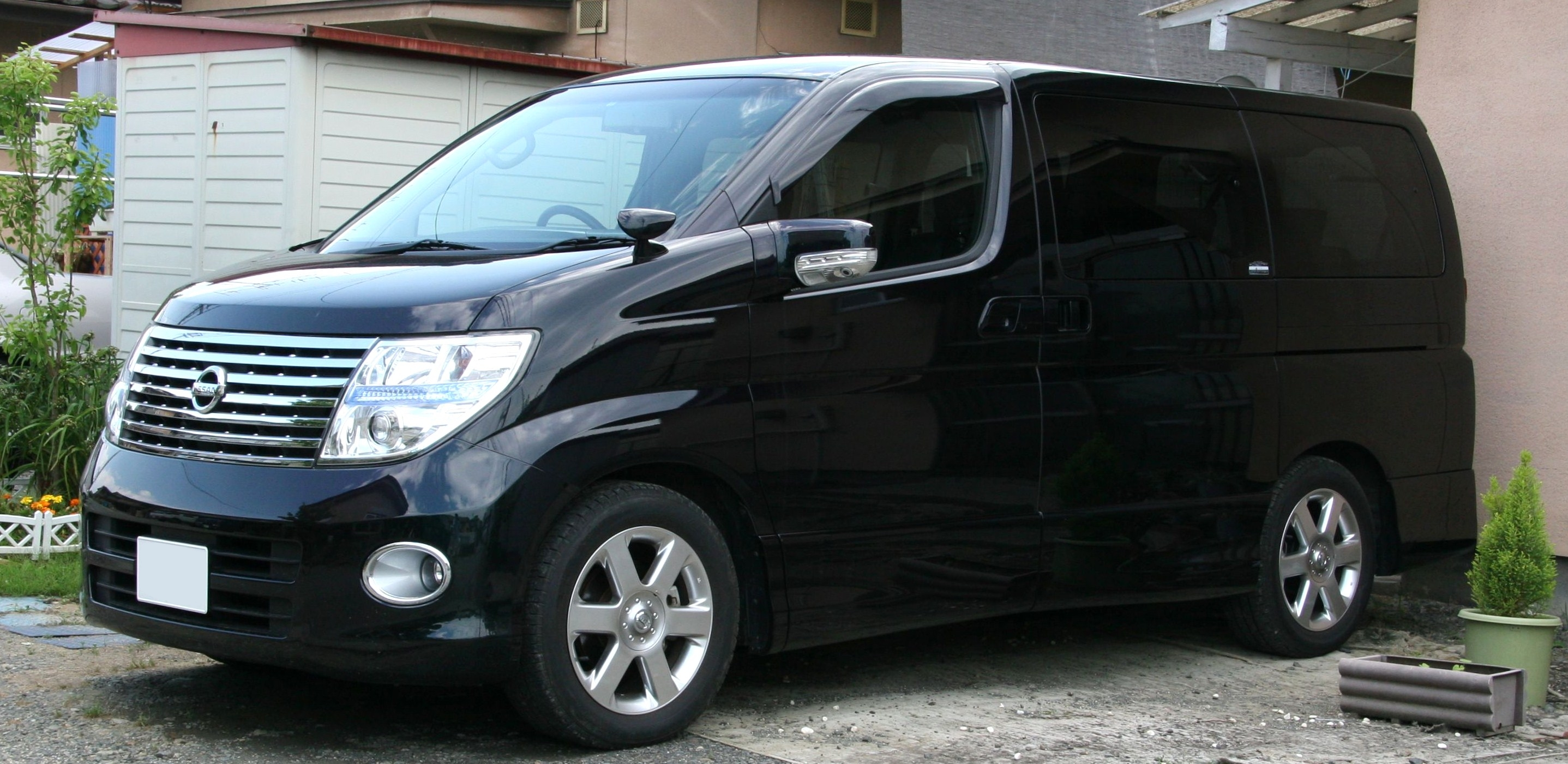
First facelift Nissan Elgrand E51 Highway Star (Japan)

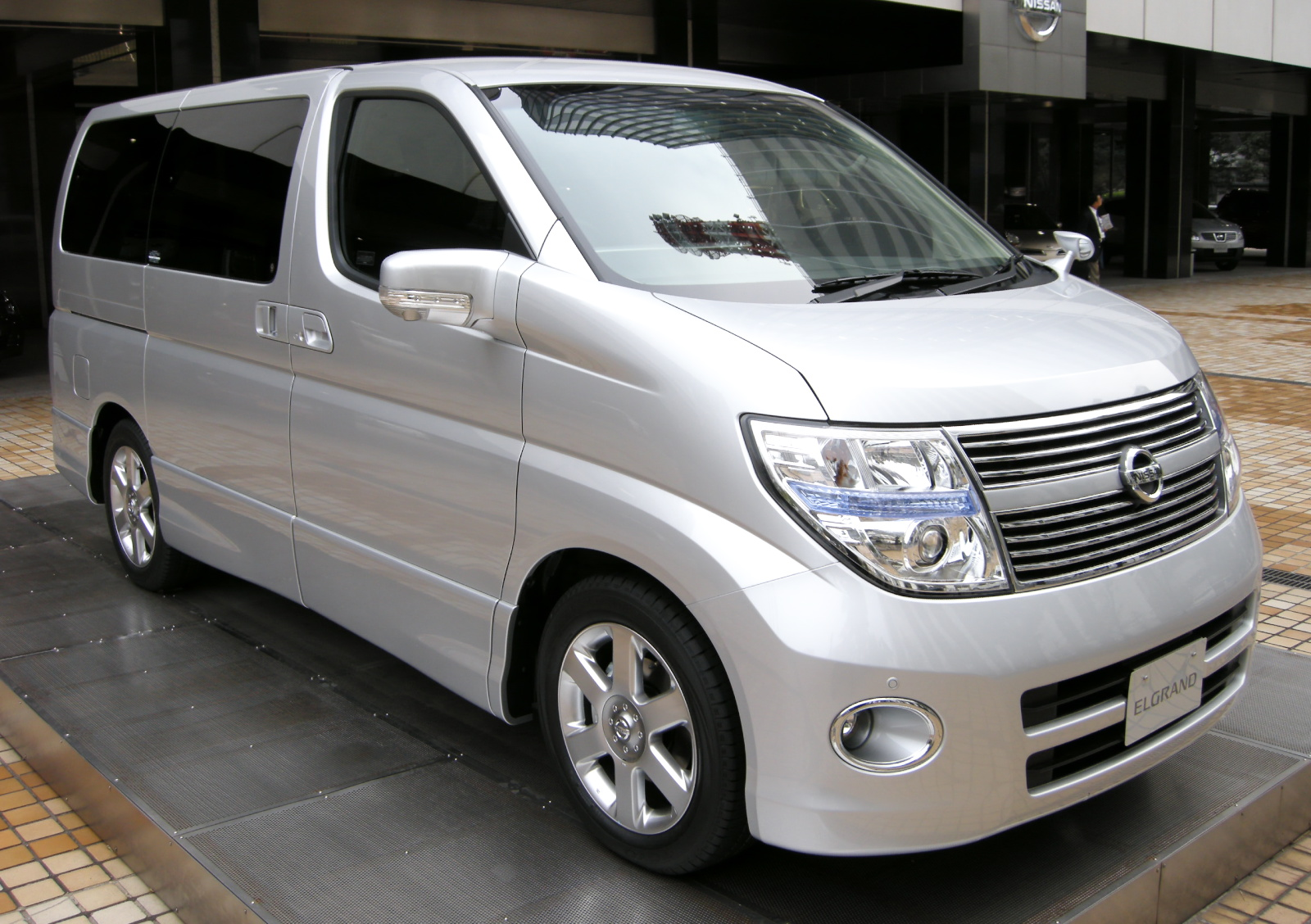
Second facelift Nissan Elgrand E51 Highway Star (Japan)

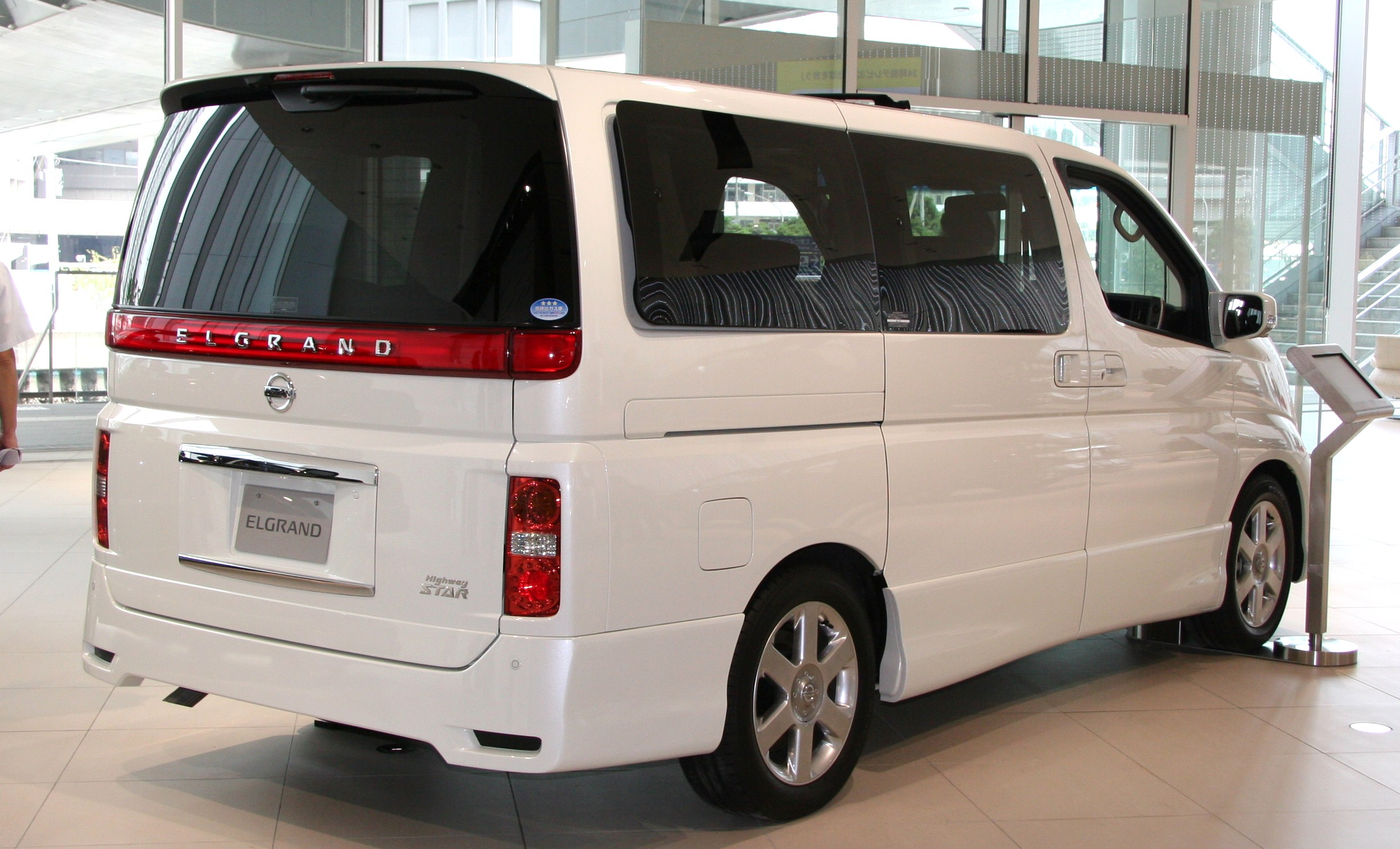
Second facelift Nissan Elgrand E51 Highway Star (Japan)

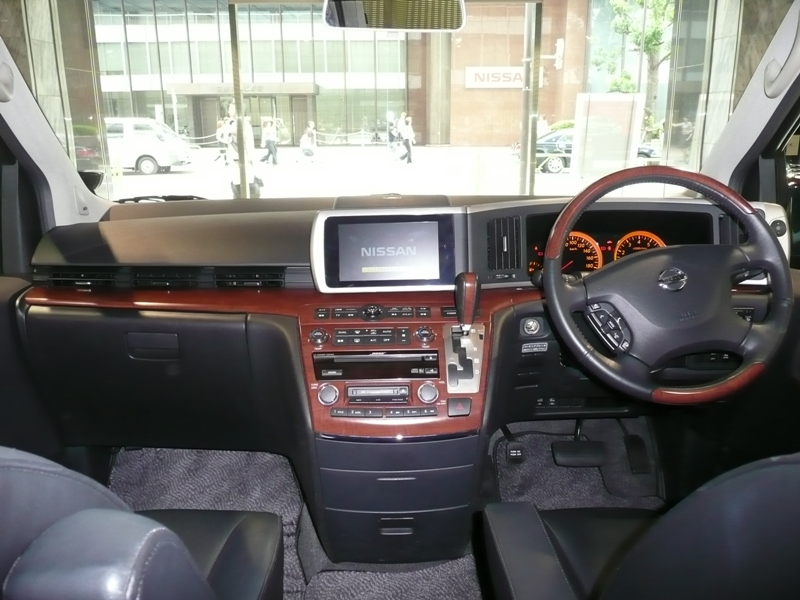
Interior (first facelift)

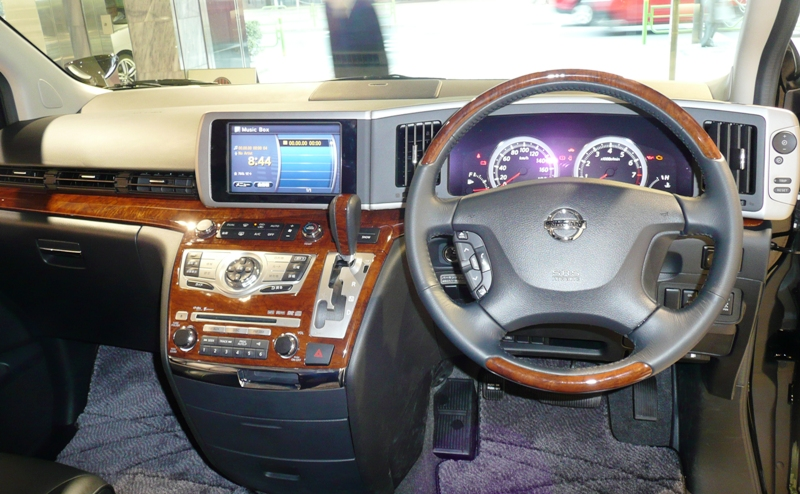
Interior of the late 2007 (E51 second facelift)

==== Nissan Forum concept (2008) ====
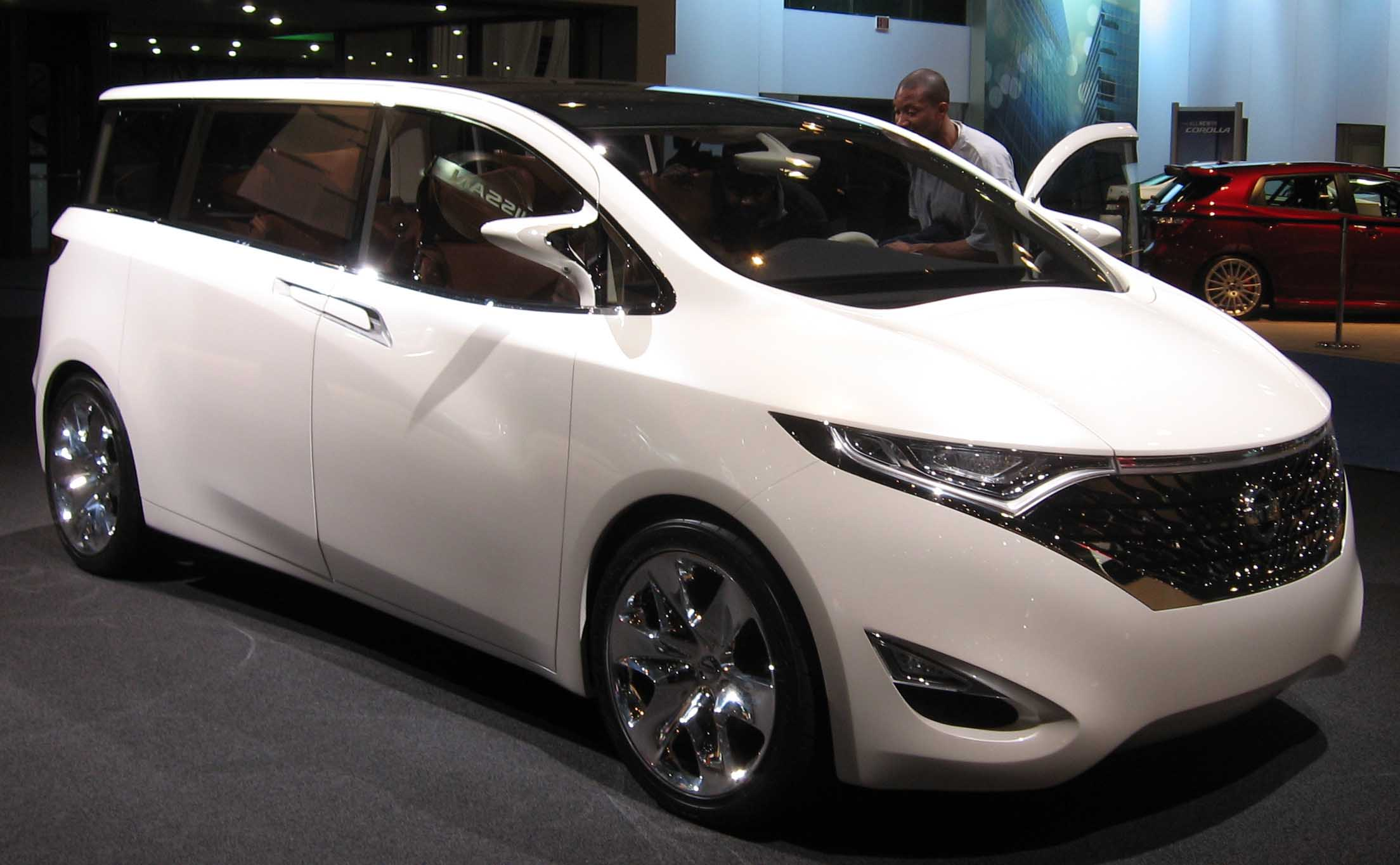
Nissan Forum concept

The Nissan Forum is a concept vehicle based on the E51 Nissan Elgrand, developed by Nissan Design America. It features trackless sliding side doors, hidden sunshades in SkyView moonroof panels, LED lights front and rear, soft-edged side outside mirrors, wide six-spoke alloy wheels and low-profile tires, a wide rear hatch, dual exhaust outlets, dual climate controls, Bluetooth wireless technology and mood lighting under the upper and lower console areas. It also has a console-mounted microwave, vertical wave pattern carpeting, "Turntable" seating, a Bose media system, and Around View Monitor. The design of the Forum would be later used on the R42H Nissan Quest, the North American counterpart of the succeeding E52 Elgrand.

The concept was unveiled at the 2008 North American International Auto Show.

== Third generation (E52; 2010) ==
Third generation
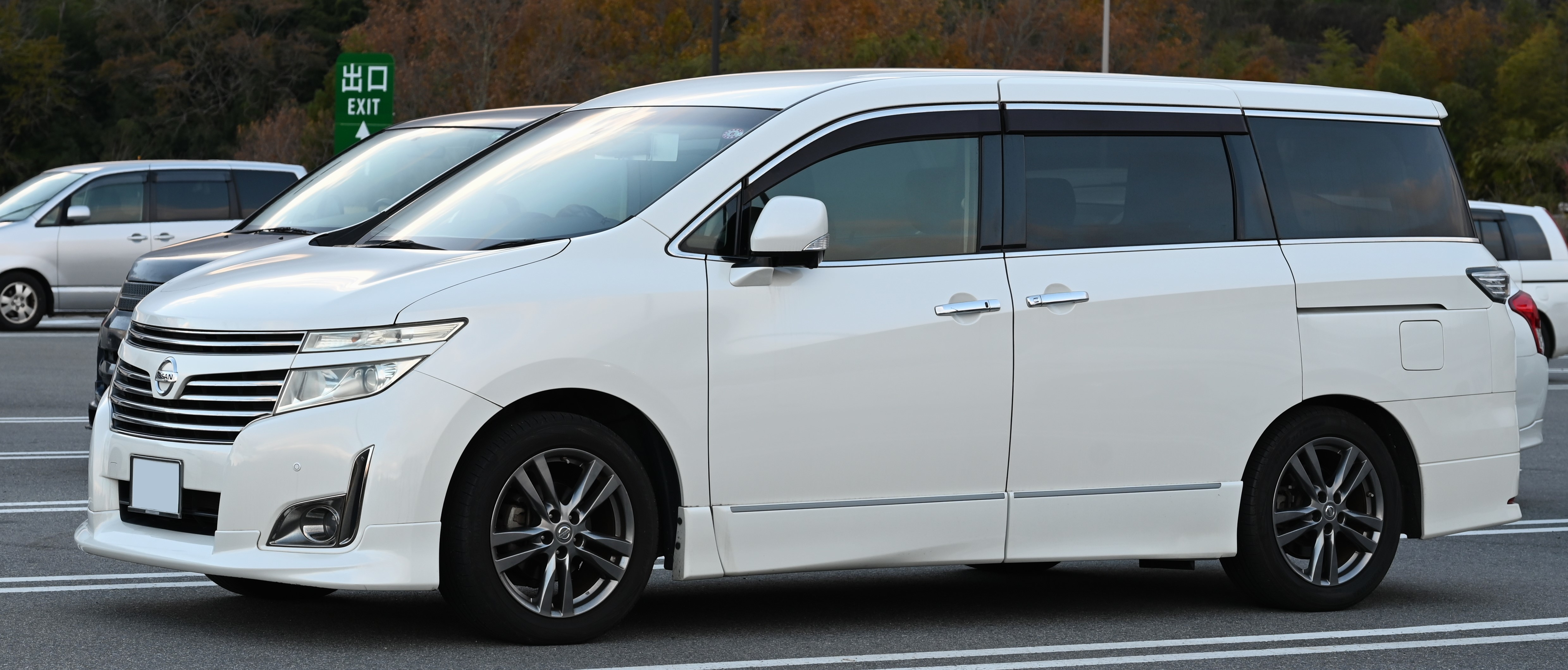
- Pre-facelift Nissan Elgrand Highway Star Urban Chrome

Overview
- Model code: E52
- Also called: Nissan Quest (2011–2017)
- Production: August 2010 – July 2026
- Assembly: Japan: Kanda, Fukuoka (Nissan Shatai Kyushu)

Body and chassis
- Body style: 5-door minivan
- Layout: Front-engine, front-wheel-drive Front-engine, four-wheel-drive
- Platform: Nissan D platform

Powertrain
- Engine: 2.5 L QR25DE I4; 3.5 L VQ35DE V6
- Transmission: 7-speed XTRONIC CVT

Dimensions
- Wheelbase: 3,000 mm (118.1 in)
- Length: 4,915 mm (193.5 in)
- Width: 1,850 mm (72.8 in)
- Height: 1,805 mm (71.1 in) (250XG) / 1,815 mm (71.5 in) (HWS)

The third generation E52 Elgrand, which ditched the previous generation's rear-wheel drive layout, shares a platform with the North American fourth generation Quest (RE52).

The Elgrand E52 was released in Japan on 18 August 2010. The pre-facelift model was manufactured from August 2010 to January 2014. Across this time period there were six trim levels available. All models were available in front-wheel drive or all-wheel drive configurations with a continuously variable transmission being the only transmission option. A 250 prefix to the trim level represented a 2.5 litre inline-four engine with 170 PS (125 kW) (QR25DE) while a 350 prefix to the trim level represented a 3.5 litre V6 engine with 280 PS (206 kW) (VQ35DE). Some models were available in both engine options while others were only available with one.

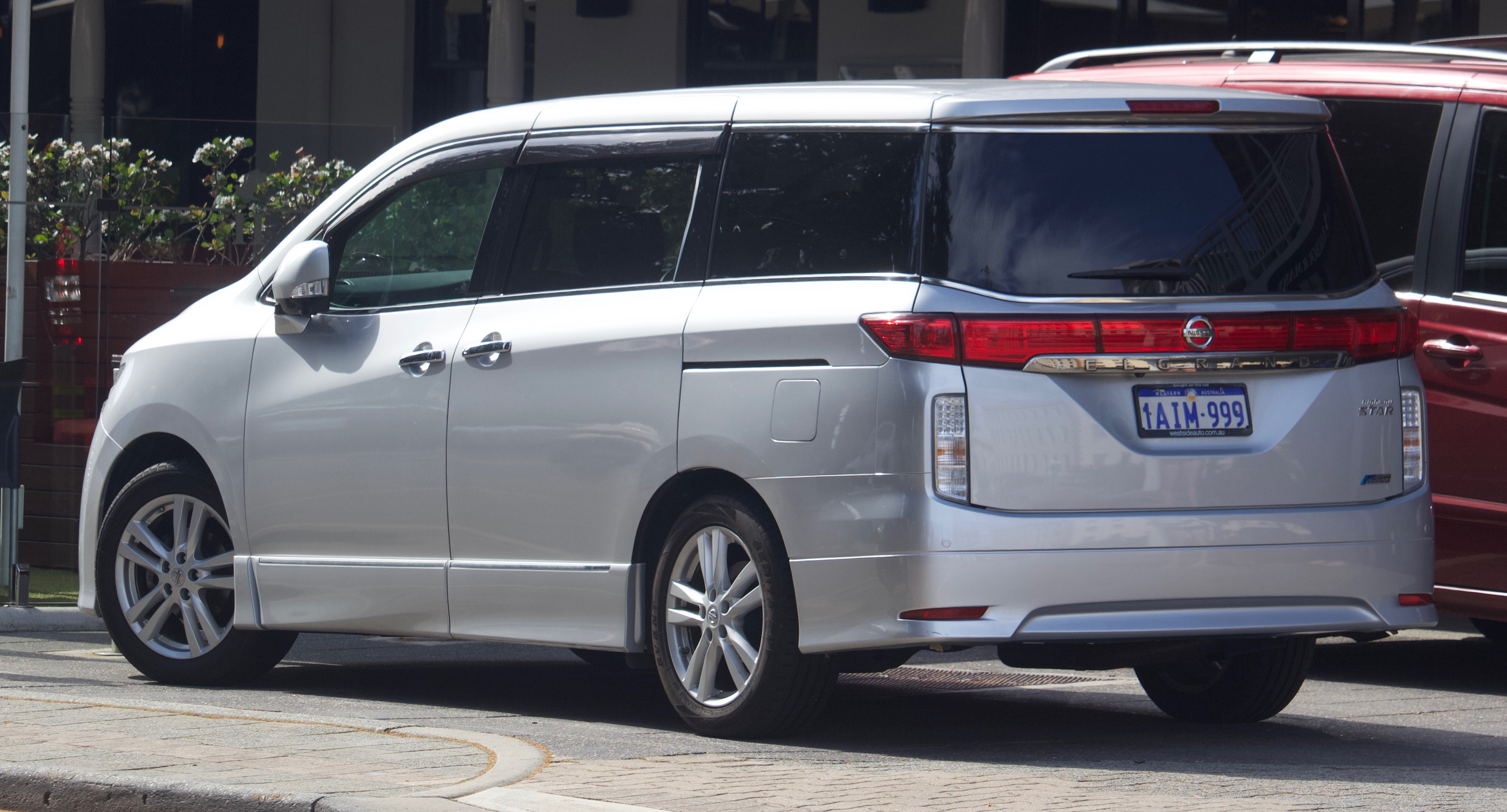
Pre-facelift Nissan Elgrand 250 Highway Star (TE52)

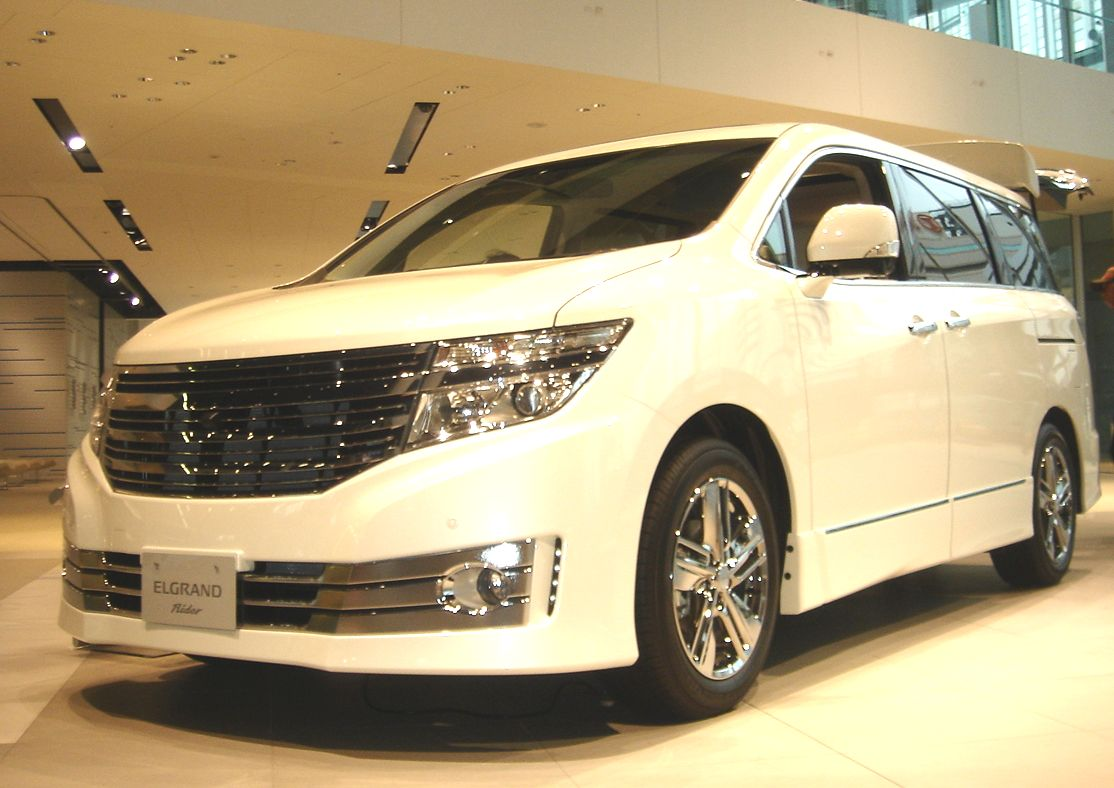
Pre-facelift Nissan Elgrand E52 Autech Rider (Japan)

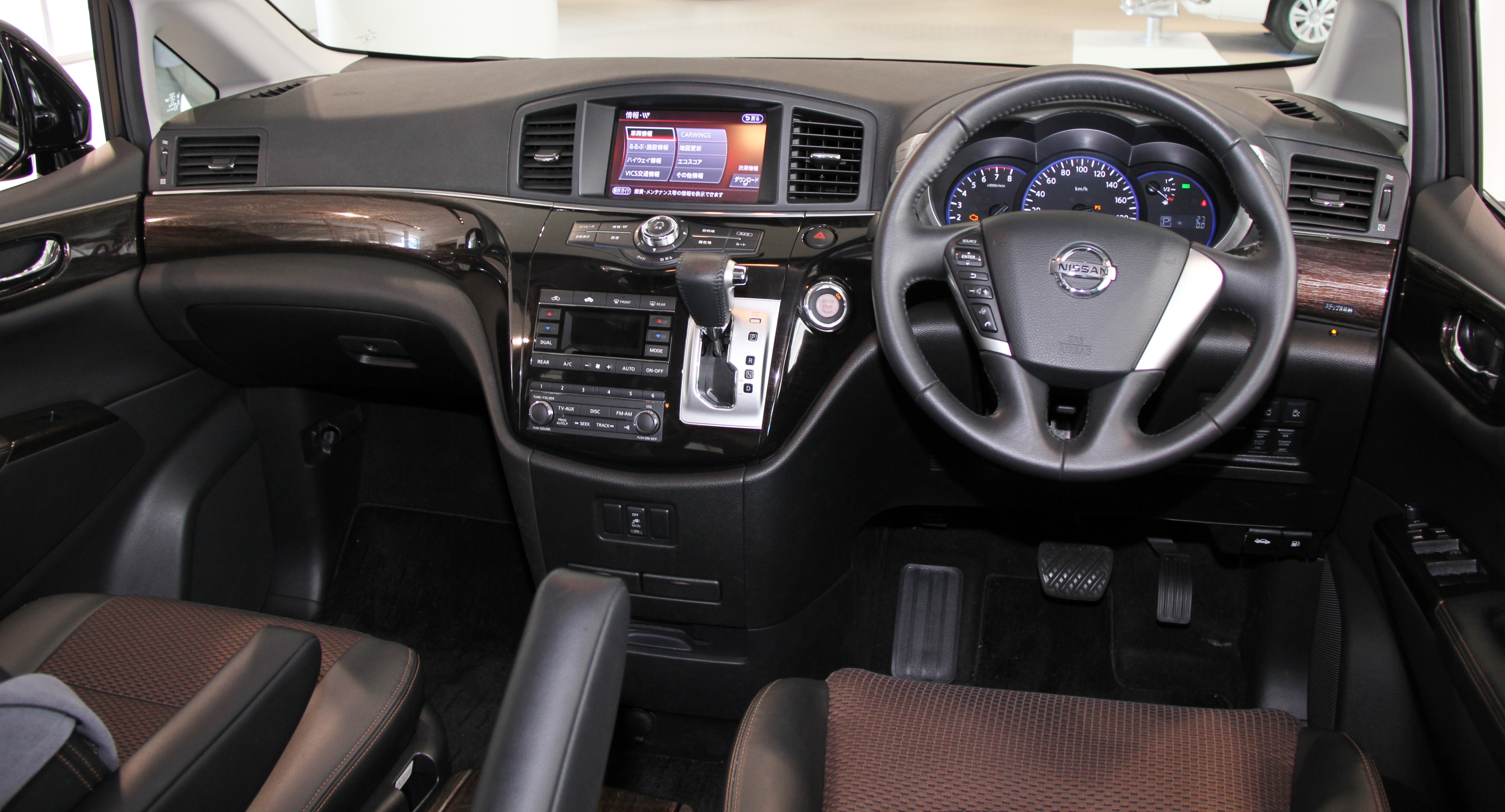
Interior

=== Trim levels (Japan) ===
- Elgrand 250 XG
- Elgrand 250/350 Highway Star
- Elgrand 250/350 Highway Star Black Leather
- Elgrand 250/350 Highway Star Urban Chrome
- Elgrand 250/350 Highway Star Urban Chrome Black Leather
- Elgrand 350 Highway Star Premium

The Enchant, a version of the Elgrand with a mobility access seat in the second row, was available in the 250/350 Highway Star and the 250 XG.

In Japan, the Elgrand is one level below Nissan's largest van, called the Nissan Caravan which has been in production since the 1960s.

The E52 went on sale in Hong Kong on 20 October 2010 as a 2011 model year vehicle. Early models included Elgrand 350 Highway Star Premium. Elgrand Highway Star AVM and Elgrand Highway Star Dynamic with VQ35DE engine went on sale on 15 February 2012. ELGRAND 250 was added on 17 January 2013.

=== Minor changes ===
Nissan Elgrand receives update in 2011 includes: Object motion sensor, Power liftgate (standard on 350 Highway Star, optional on 250 models), Standard active AFS on 250 models

Urban Chrome is a version of the 250 Highway Star and 350 Highway Star with dark chrome grille, dark chrome fog lamp finisher, front protector, graphite-finish 18-inch aluminium wheels, clear rear combination lamp, LED high-mount strap lamp (clear type), and power sliding doors on the 250 Highway Star (standard on regular 350 Highway Star versions). The 2011 update went on sale on 11 November 2011.

The Elgrand VIP was introduced replaced the Nissan President VIP was discontinued. The space between the first and second rows is separated by a cabinet, which houses a built-in freezer and bookshelf and a large 11-inch widescreen with is also standard equipment. The passenger side is equipped with a side step and automatic sliding door. In addition, individual orders such as changing the rear seats to two or seating capacity of four, are also available. In September 2011, a 2-row version (4-seater) was added to the existing 3-row version (7-seater).

Nissan announced updates again in 2012 includes: Collision avoidance assist with brake override and 4 ultrasound sonar sensors as an option. The Carwings navigation system was included, 11-inch wide rear seat monitor entertainment system, around view monitor, intelligent cruise control, intelligent brake assist, and collision avoidance assist at first only on 350 Highway Star Premium, but became standard equipment. New metal grey colour (with multi-flex colour) for a total of 5 body colour choices.

The Highway Star Urban Chrome Black Leather and Highway Star Black Leather are versions of Nissan Elgrand Highway Star variants, with black leather seats with silver stitching, memory seats, steering wheel, and pedals, driver and front passenger power seats, steering wheel with leather wrapping and wood trim, reverse down-view liftgate mirror, and heated seats. These models went on sale on 22 November 2012.

=== 2014 facelift ===
The Nissan Elgrand underwent a major change in November 2013 and went to sale on 15 January 2014. However, the 250XG remain the same as pre-facelift model, with no changes to its exterior design.

The "Highway Star" grade, the grille was redesigned. The chrome grille has been widened vertically, and the LED headlights and front bumper have also been reshaped. The grille is now framed with chrome parts. Standard cruise control now available for all models.

The Autech "Rider" series was also improved, with changes to the design of the front and dedicated aluminum wheels, as well as a new low-down suspension. In the interior, the dedicated finisher was changed to a wood grain gold finish. Autech options include large roof spoiler and exclusive seat upholstery in premium white leather (3.5-litre engine model only). Autech dealer options include an exclusive front protector and exclusive front protector decal.

The facelift was unveiled at the 43rd Tokyo Motor Show. Followed by 2014 Tokyo Auto Salon (Rider High Performance Spec Black Line). Nismo Performance Package was available in July 2014. Features front and rear spoilers, side skirts, and rear side spoilers, aerodynamic performance has been further improved.

The facelifted Autech Elgrand went on sale on 20 January 2014. The Autech Rider (Black Line) models include 250XG, and 350 Highway Star, while early Autech High Performance Spec models include 350 Highway Star (FWD). The facelifted Autech Enchant models include 250XG and Highway Star variants. The facelifted Autech VIP 2 and VIP 3 models include 350 Highway Star.

The facelifted Elgrand went to sale in Hong Kong. It was went to sale in Malaysia in May 2014, and Indonesia in July 2014.

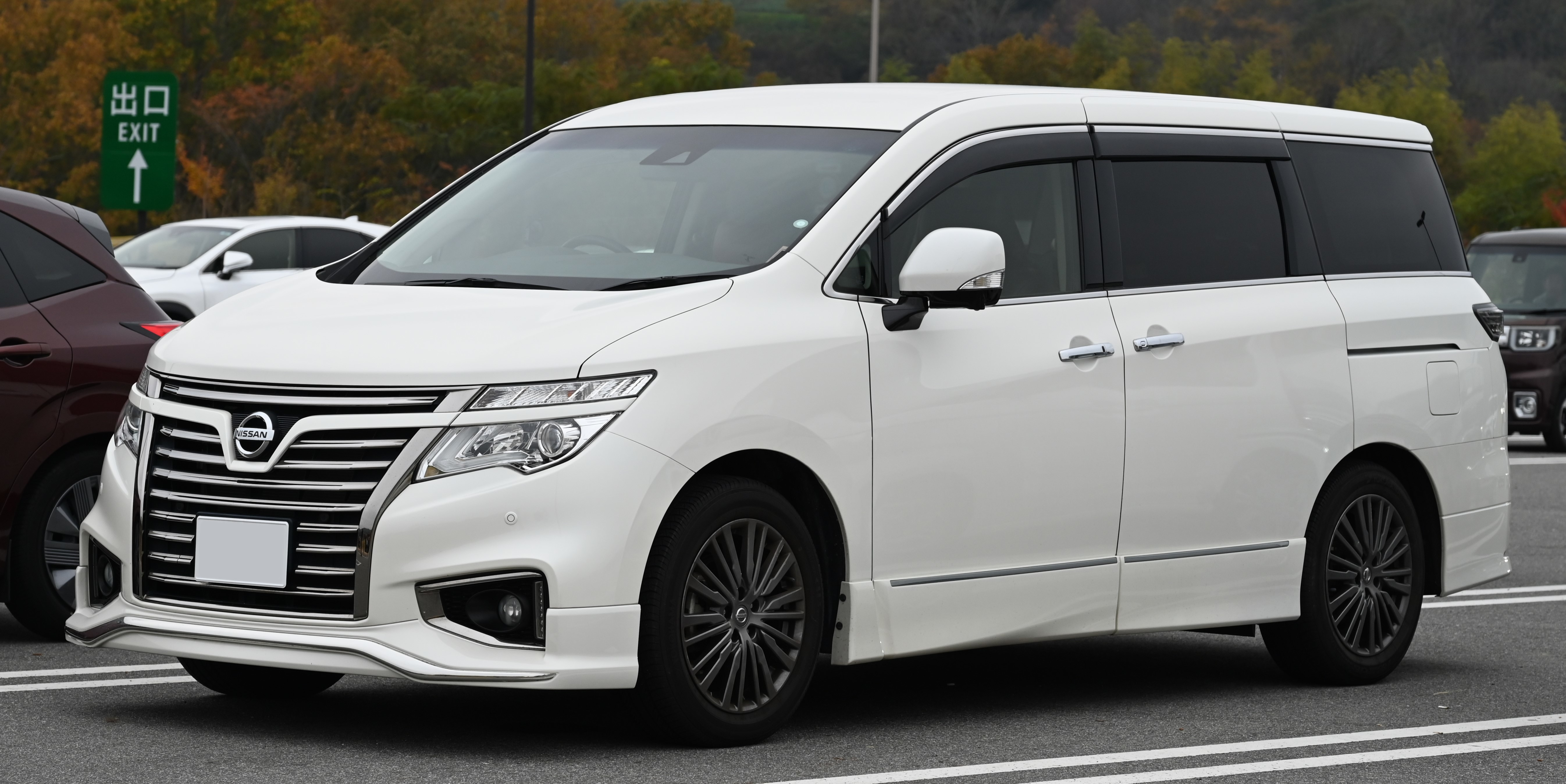
2014 facelift

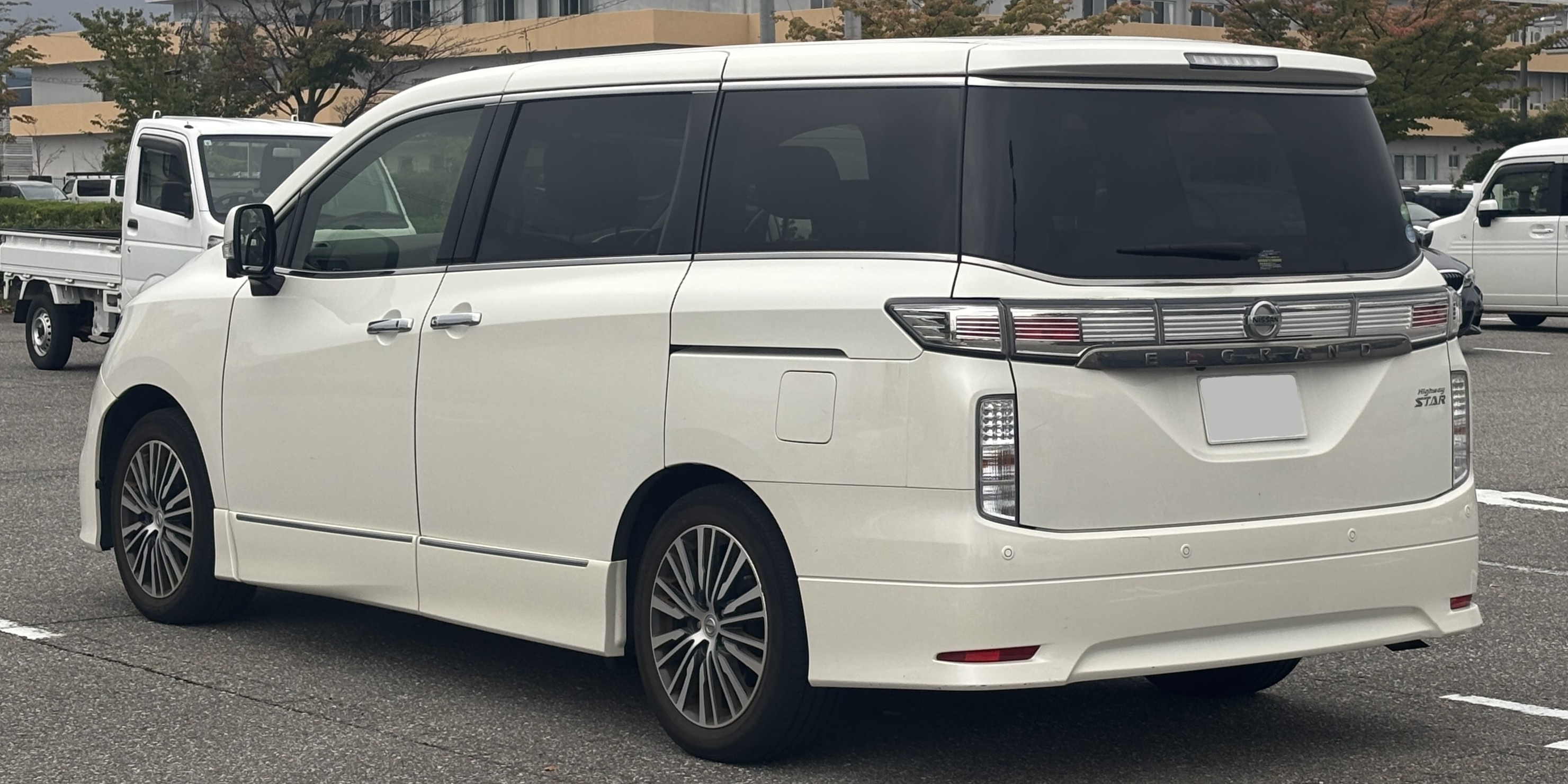
Rear View

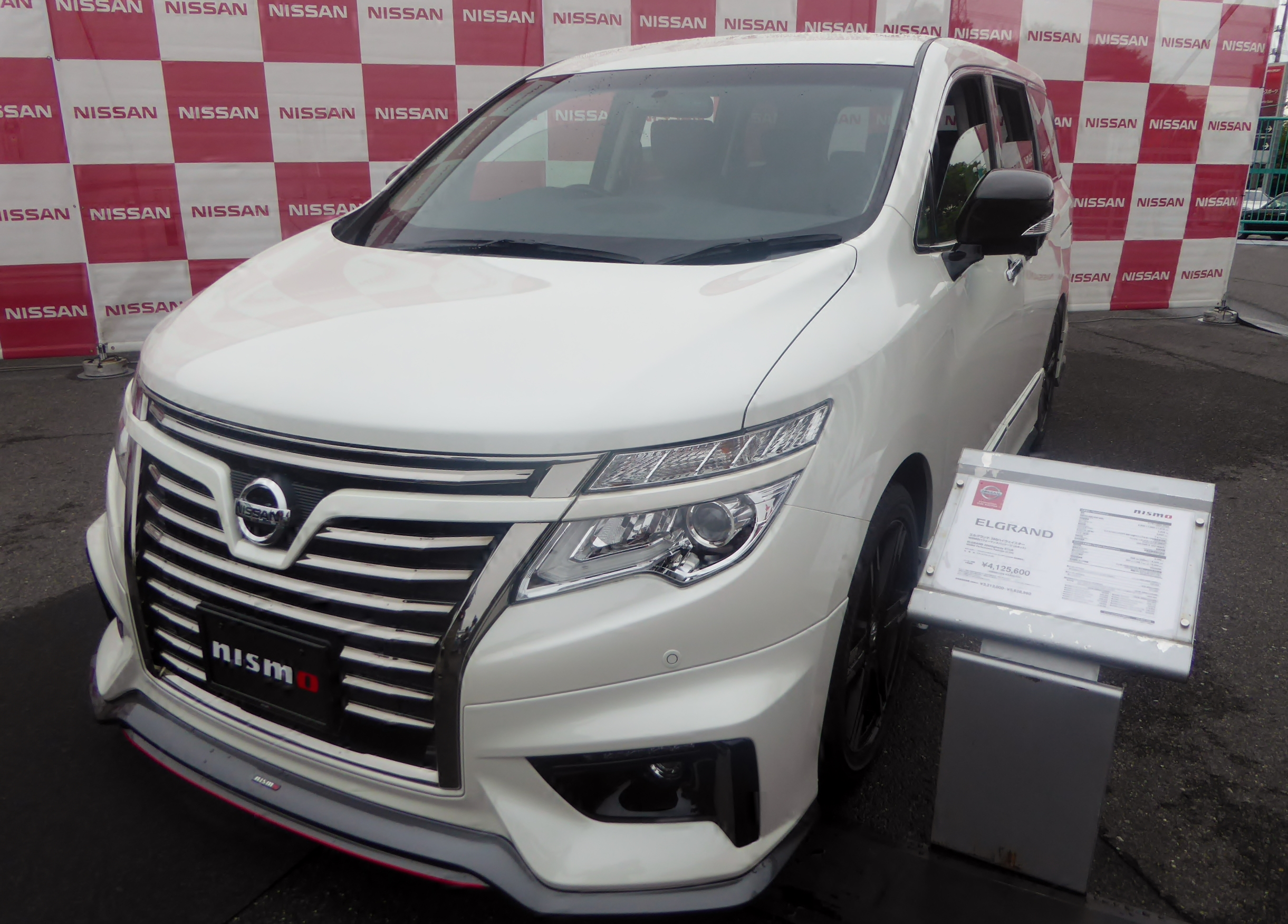
Elgrand Nismo

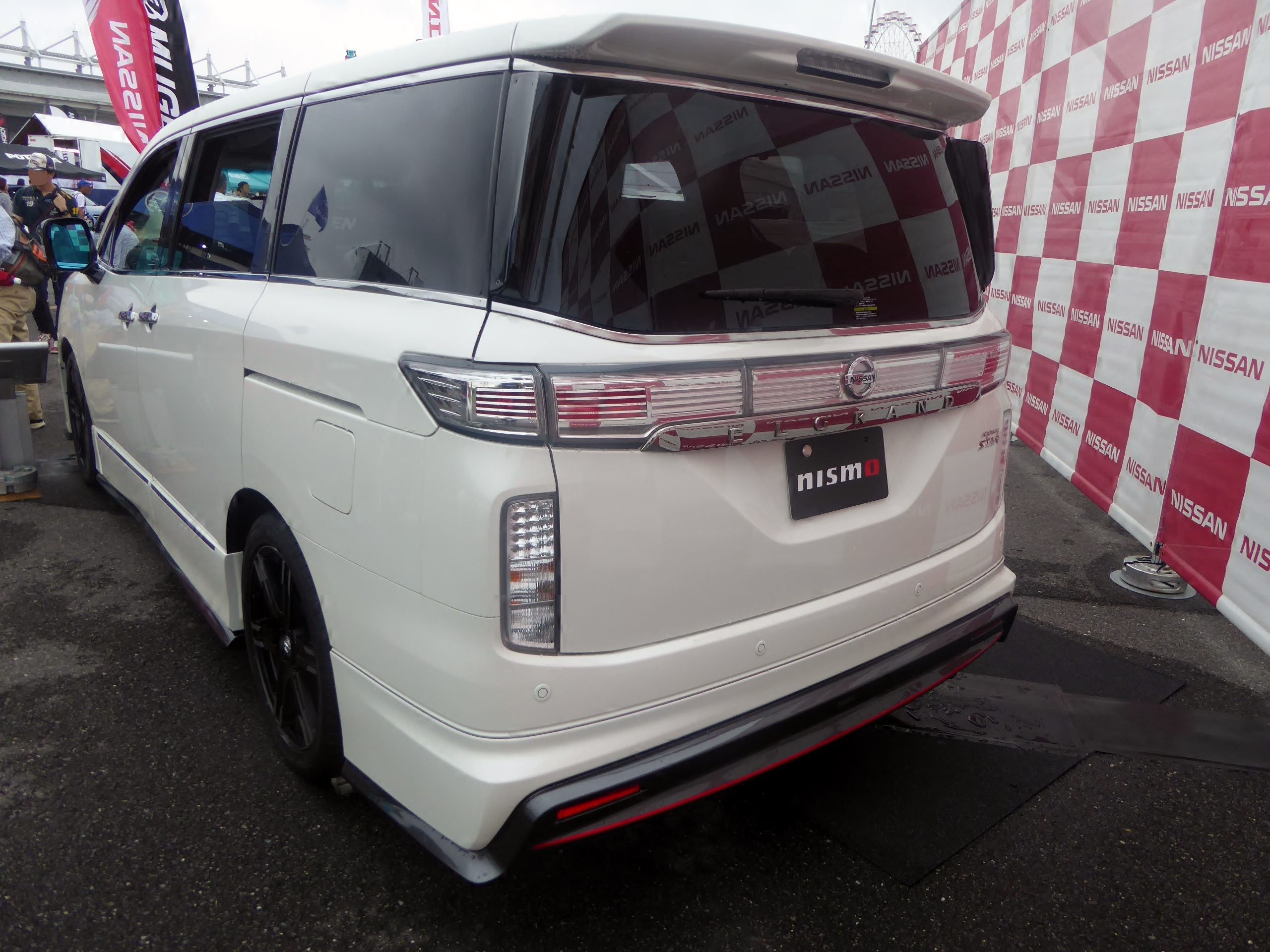
Elgrand Nismo rear view

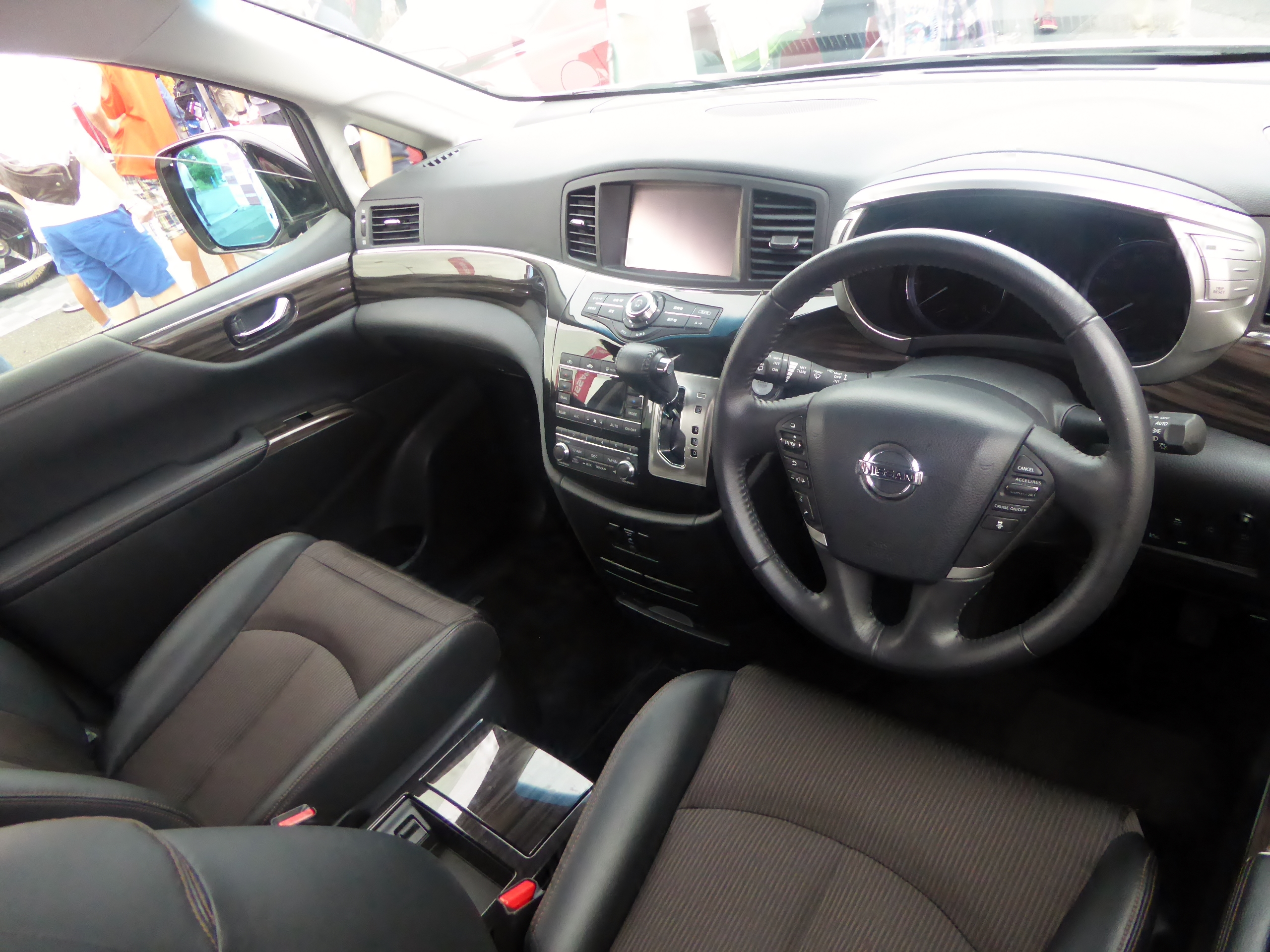
Interior

=== 2020 facelift ===
The Elgrand received its second facelift on 12 October 2020.

The 250XG was discontinued, leaving only the "Highway Star" in the lineup. These 2020 changes include exterior design of the front grille was slightly changed. The interior is made with a horizontal theme from the instrument panel to the door trim, and a large 10-inch display finished in piano black is placed in the centre. The premium seats have been changed to a continuous quilted pattern. The rear seats have added a folding seatback function to the captain's chairs, and are also equipped with angle-adjustable armrests, foldable seatside tables, and an ottoman seat

Nissan announced another minor change for 2022, include Nissan's new logo was adopted.

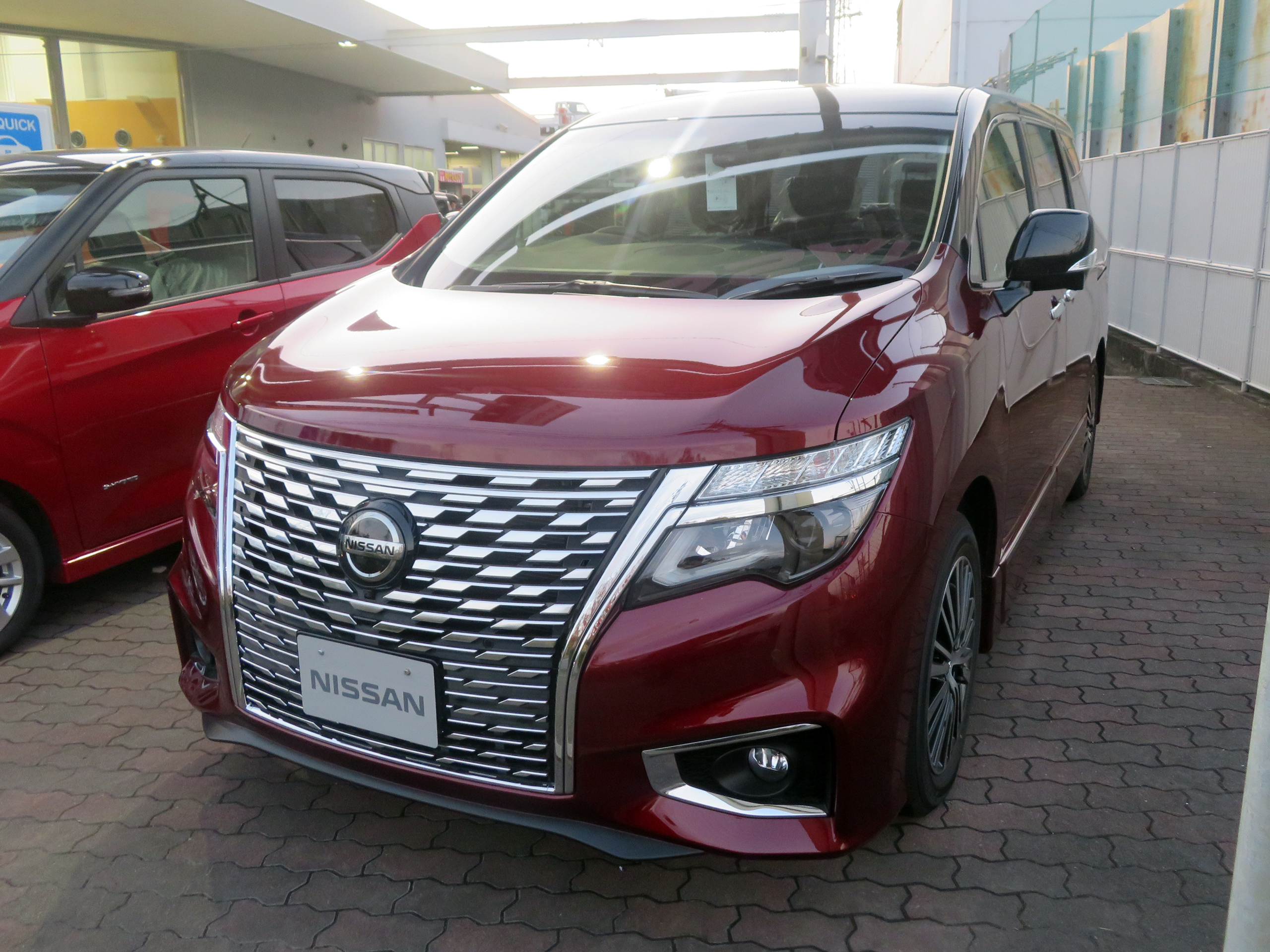
2020 facelift

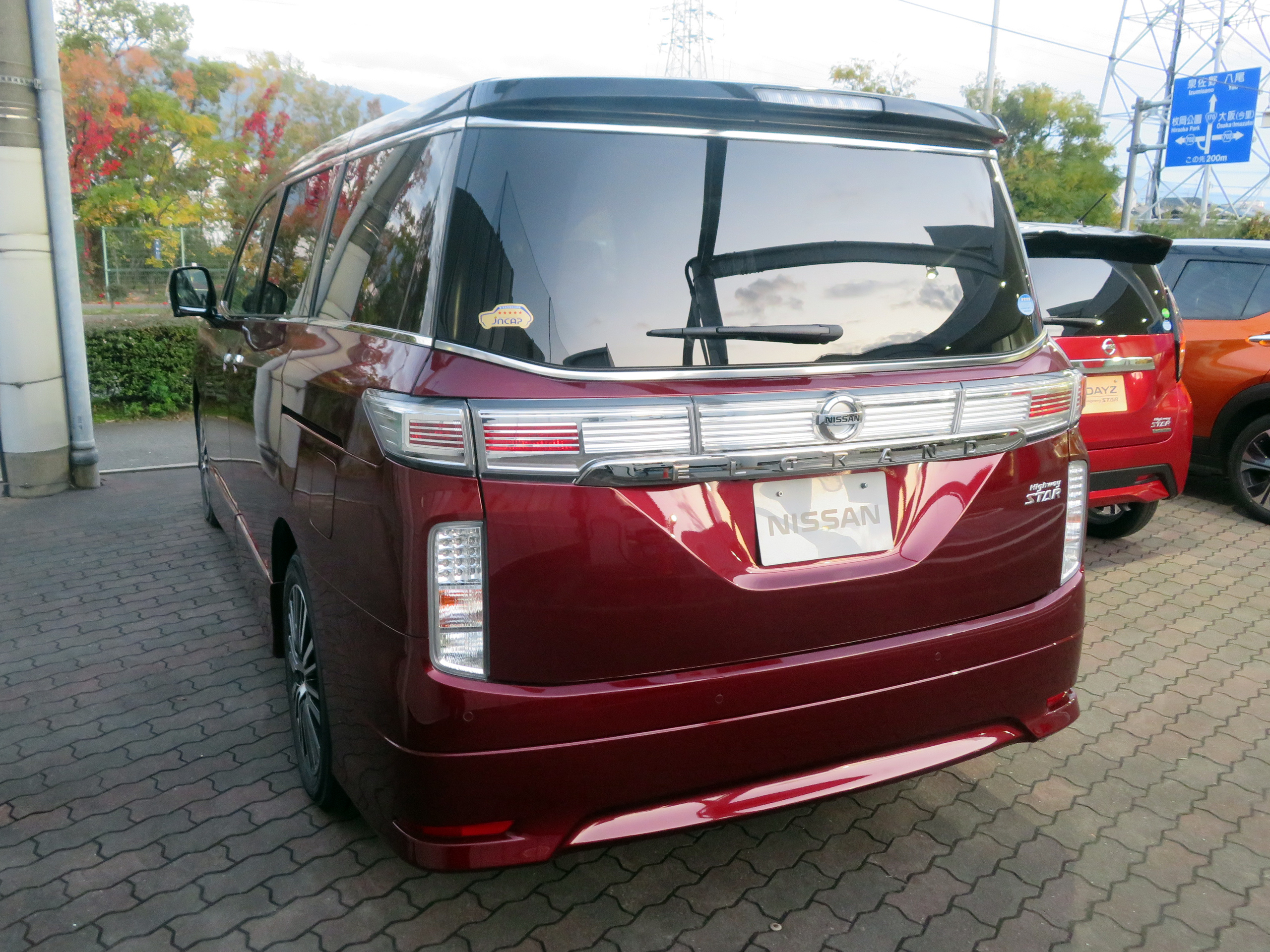
Rear View

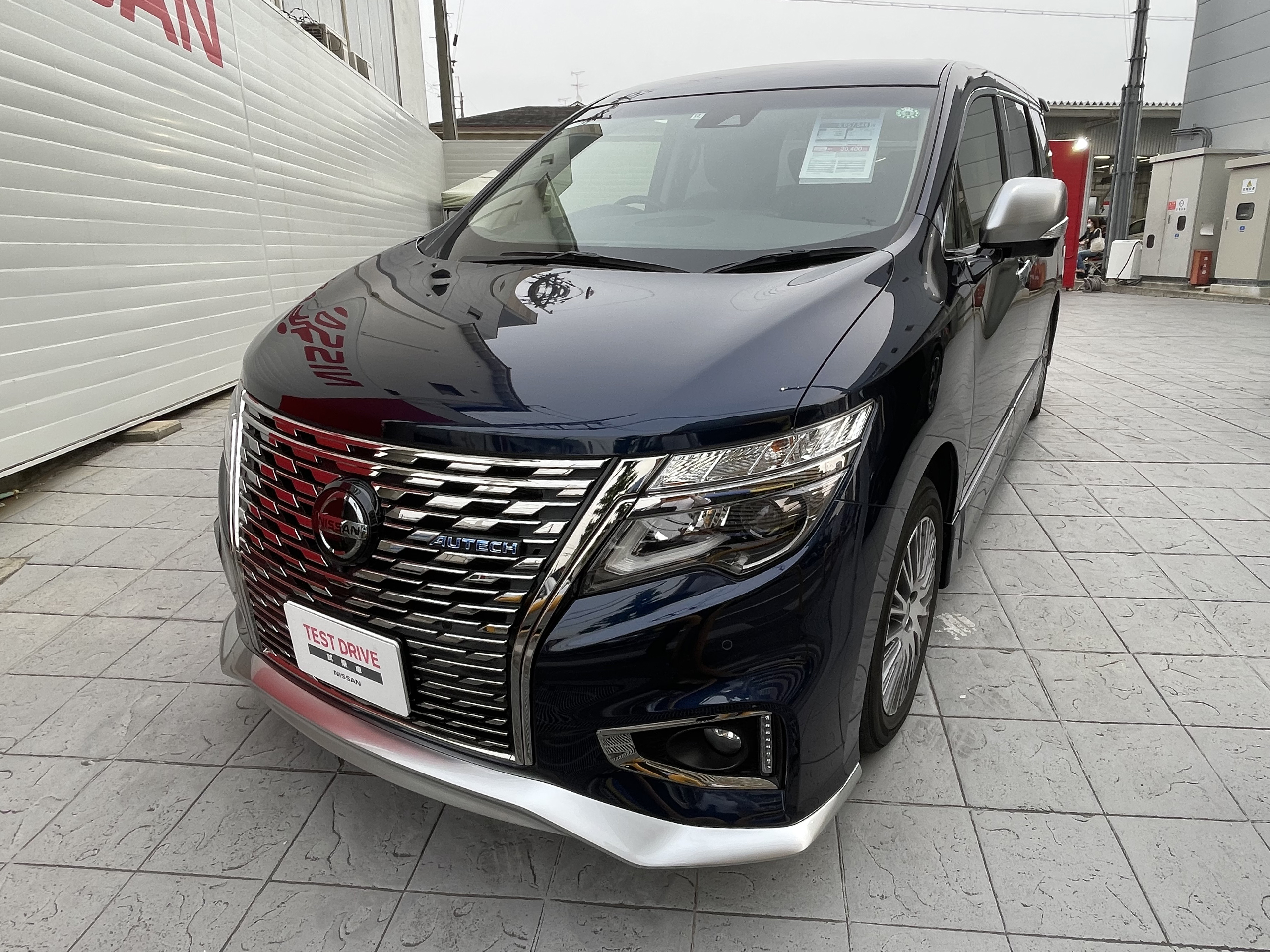
Elgrand Autech

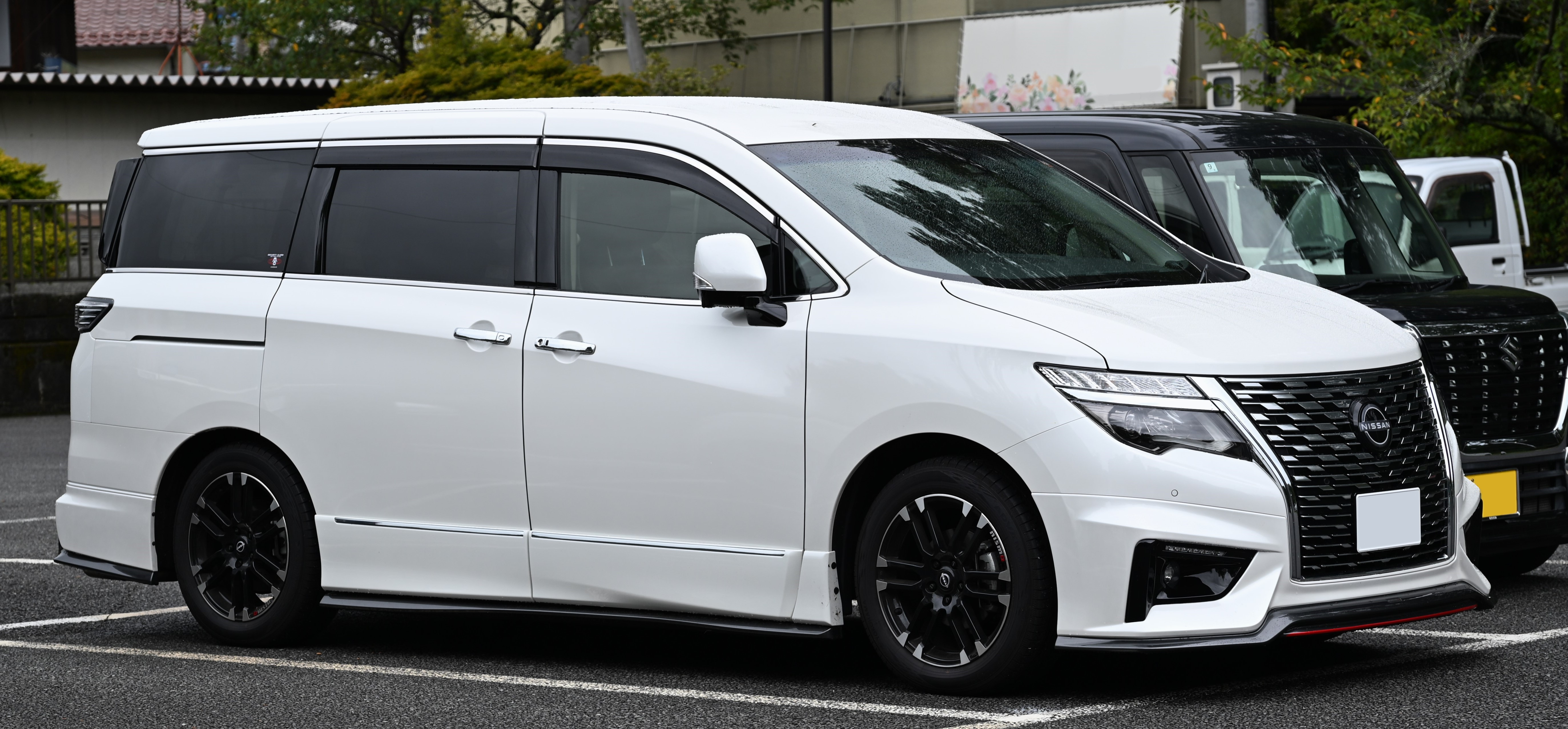
Elgrand Nismo

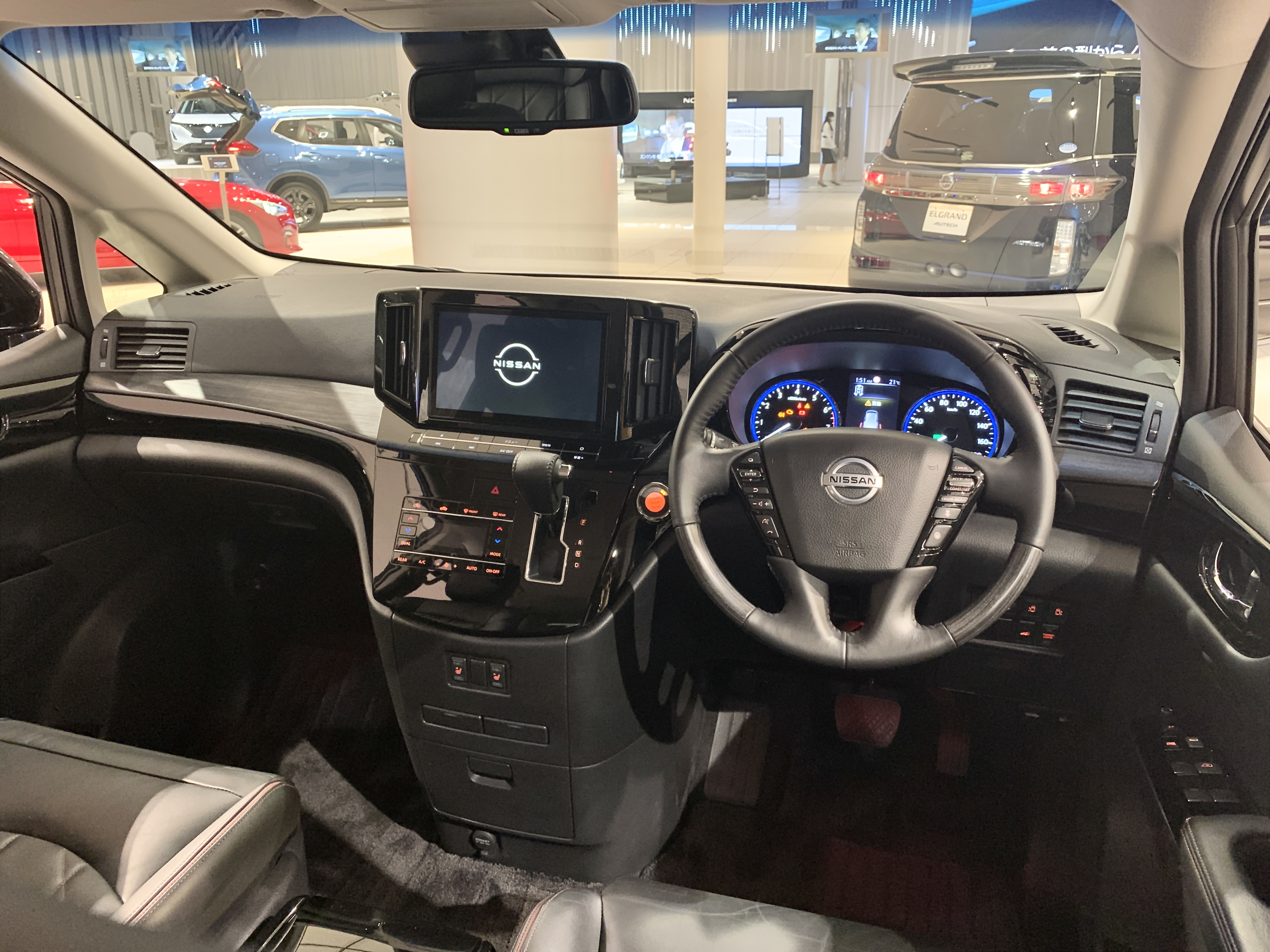
Interior

== Fourth generation (E53; 2026) ==
Fourth generation
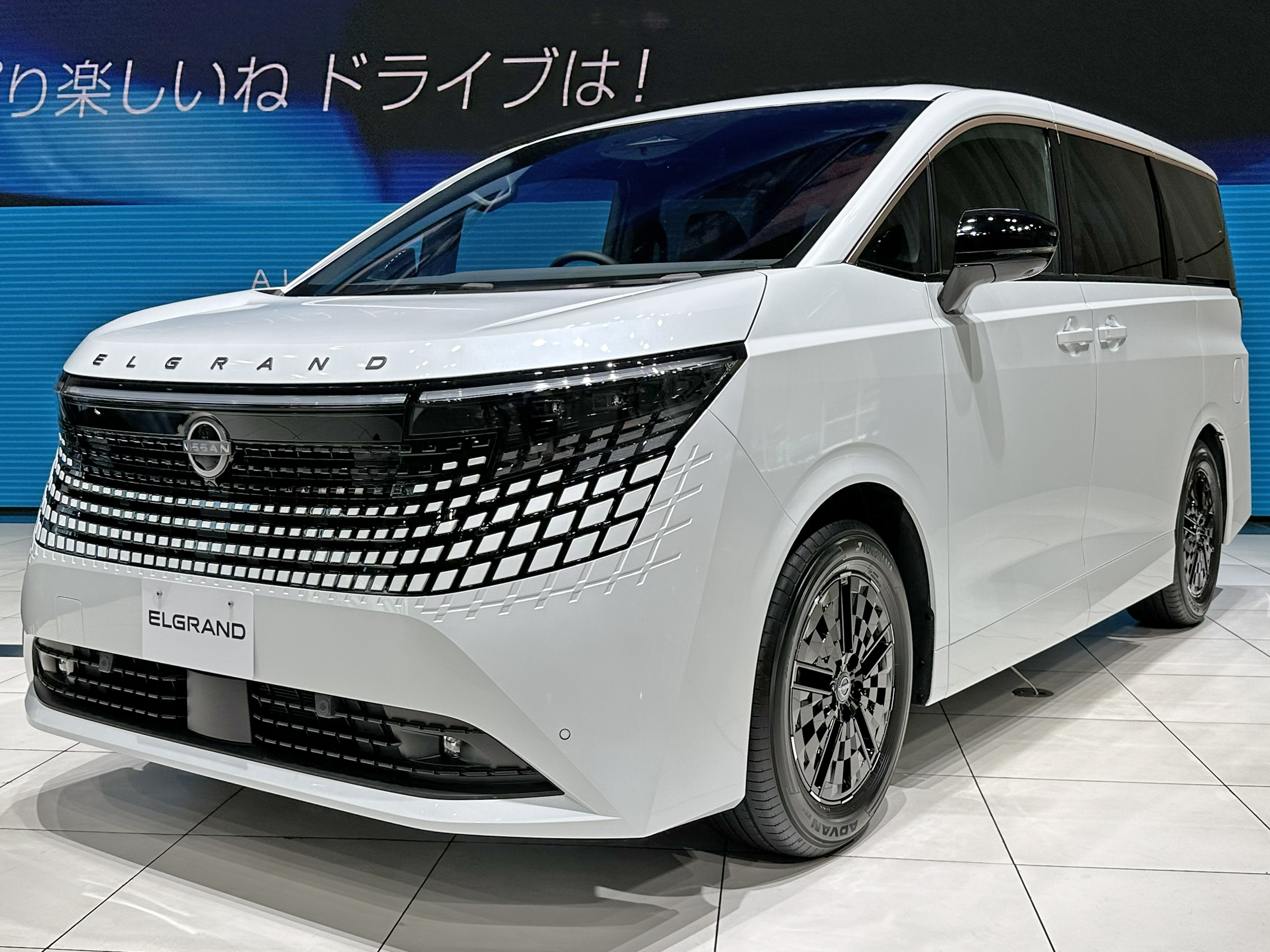
- Nissan Elgrand G e-4ORCE

Overview
- Model code: E53
- Production: May 2026 – present
- Assembly: Japan: Kanda, Fukuoka (Nissan Shatai Kyushu)

Body and chassis
- Body style: 5-door minivan
- Layout: Front-engine, four-wheel-drive
- Platform: Nissan D platform

Powertrain
- Engine: Petrol hybrid: 1.5 L ZR15DDTe DOHC e-Power turbo I3
- Electric motor: AC synchronous; 151 kW (202 hp; 205 PS) YM52 (front); 100 kW (134 hp; 136 PS) MM45 (rear)
- Power output: 103 kW (138 hp; 140 PS) (ZR15DDTe engine); 251 kW (337 hp; 341 PS) (electric motors)
- Transmission: Single speed constant ratio
- Hybrid drivetrain: Series hybrid
- Battery: Lithium-ion

Dimensions
- Wheelbase: 3,000 mm (118.1 in)
- Length: 4,995 mm (196.7 in)
- Width: 1,895 mm (74.6 in)
- Height: 1,975 mm (77.8 in)
- Curb weight: 2,430–2,510 kg (5,357–5,534 lb)

In late April 2025, Nissan teased the fourth generation of the Elgrand. This new generation is shown to take styling cues from the Hyper Tourer concept showcased in 2023, albeit in a significantly subdued manner. The updated Elgrand features a three-piece light bar at the front, rectangular daytime running lights (DRLs) below the headlights, and a full-width patterned light bar at the rear. Additionally, the minivan is equipped with a roof-mounted spoiler, similar to that of the smaller Serena. The E53 Elgrand is also exclusively available as a series hybrid, utilising the third generation of Nissan's e-POWER hybrid technology.

The production version was revealed at Japan Mobility Show on 29 October 2025. All grades were powered by a ZR15DDTe engine with e-Power hybrid system as standard for all grades.

The E53 Elgrand went on sale on 16 July 2026. Available in 2 variants: X, and G. The Autech variants includes: Autech, Autech Line, and VIP. The "Step Type" is optional for all grades.

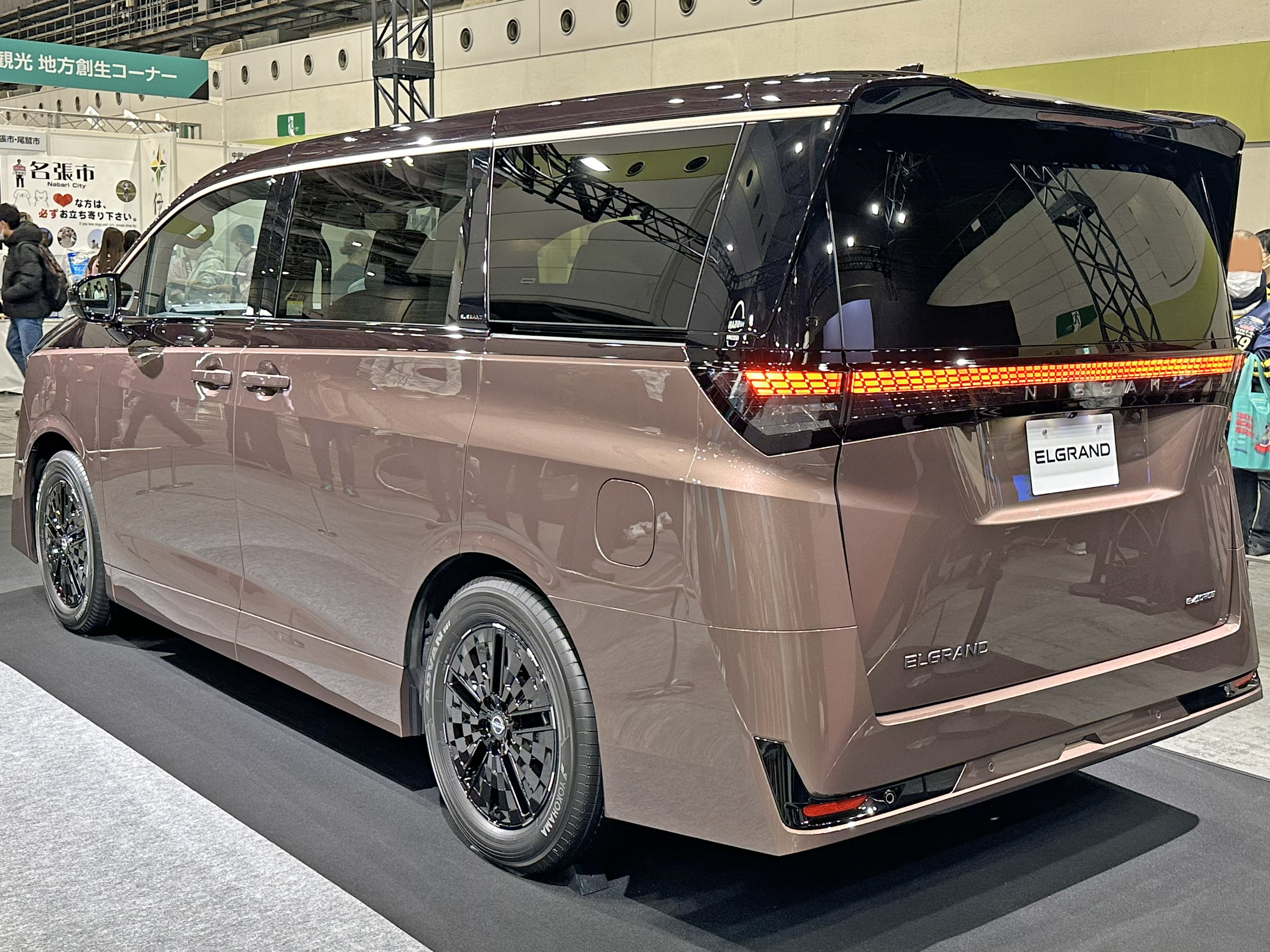
Rear view

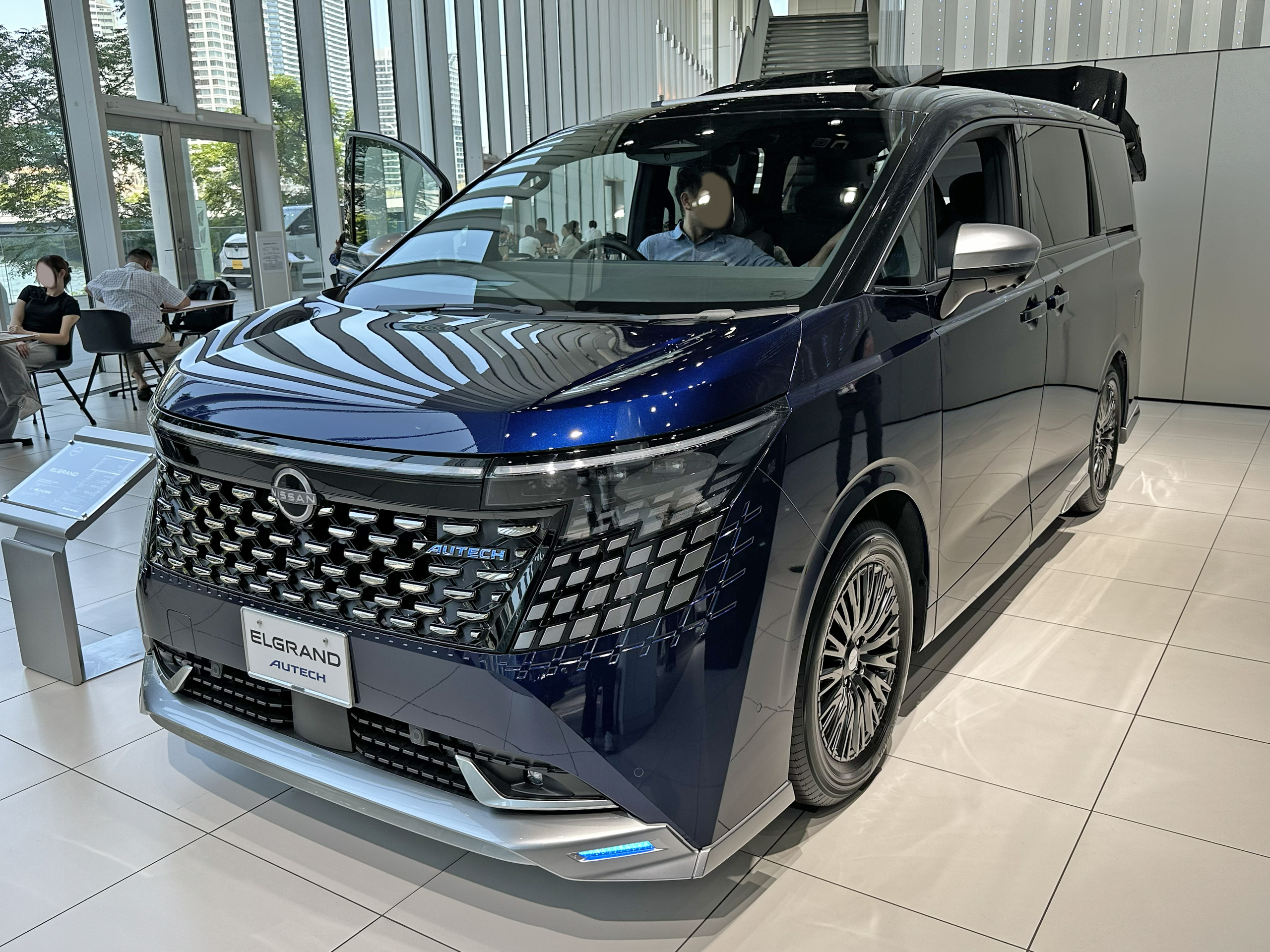
Nissan Elgrand Autech

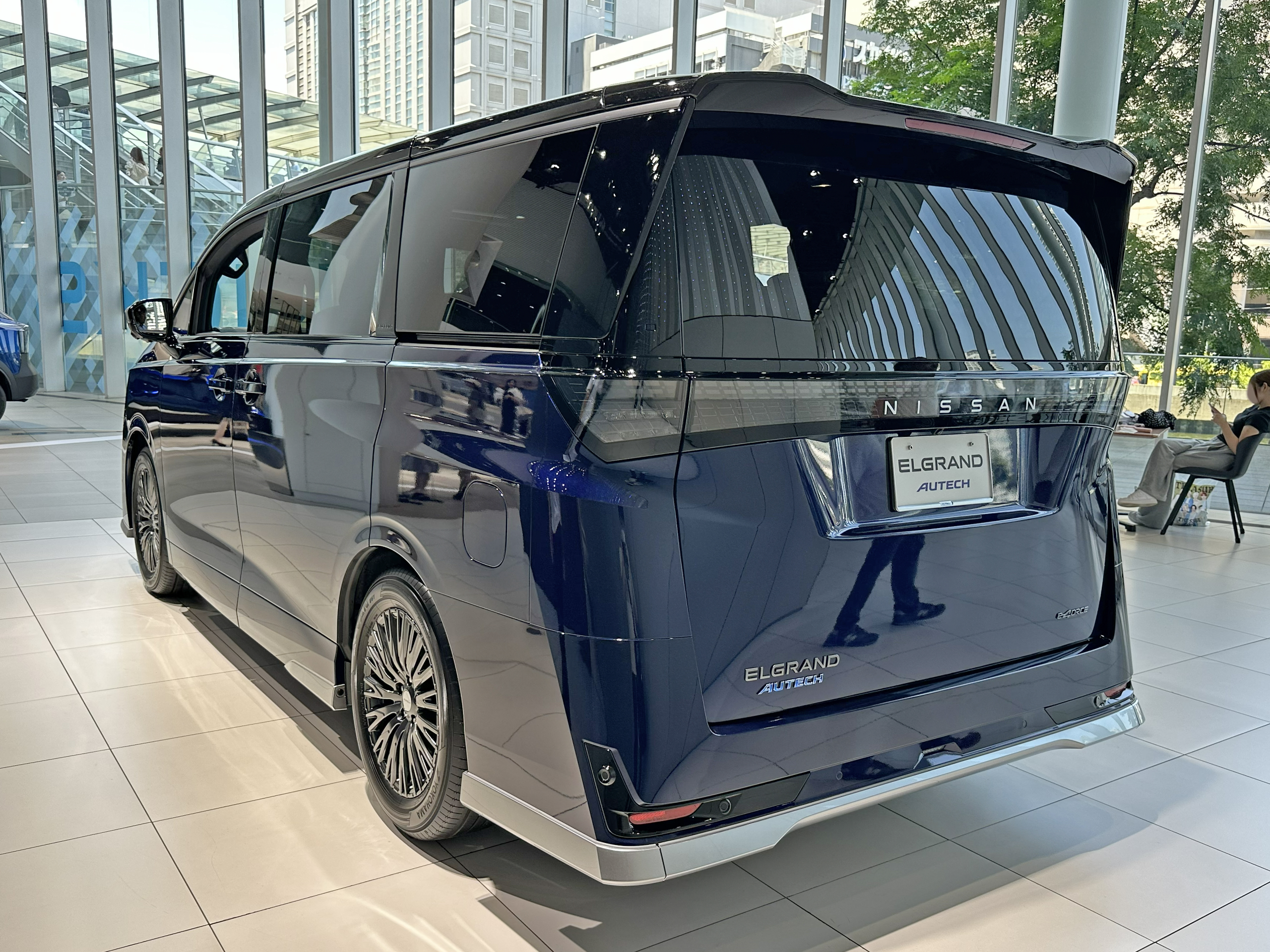
Nissan Elgrand Autech rear

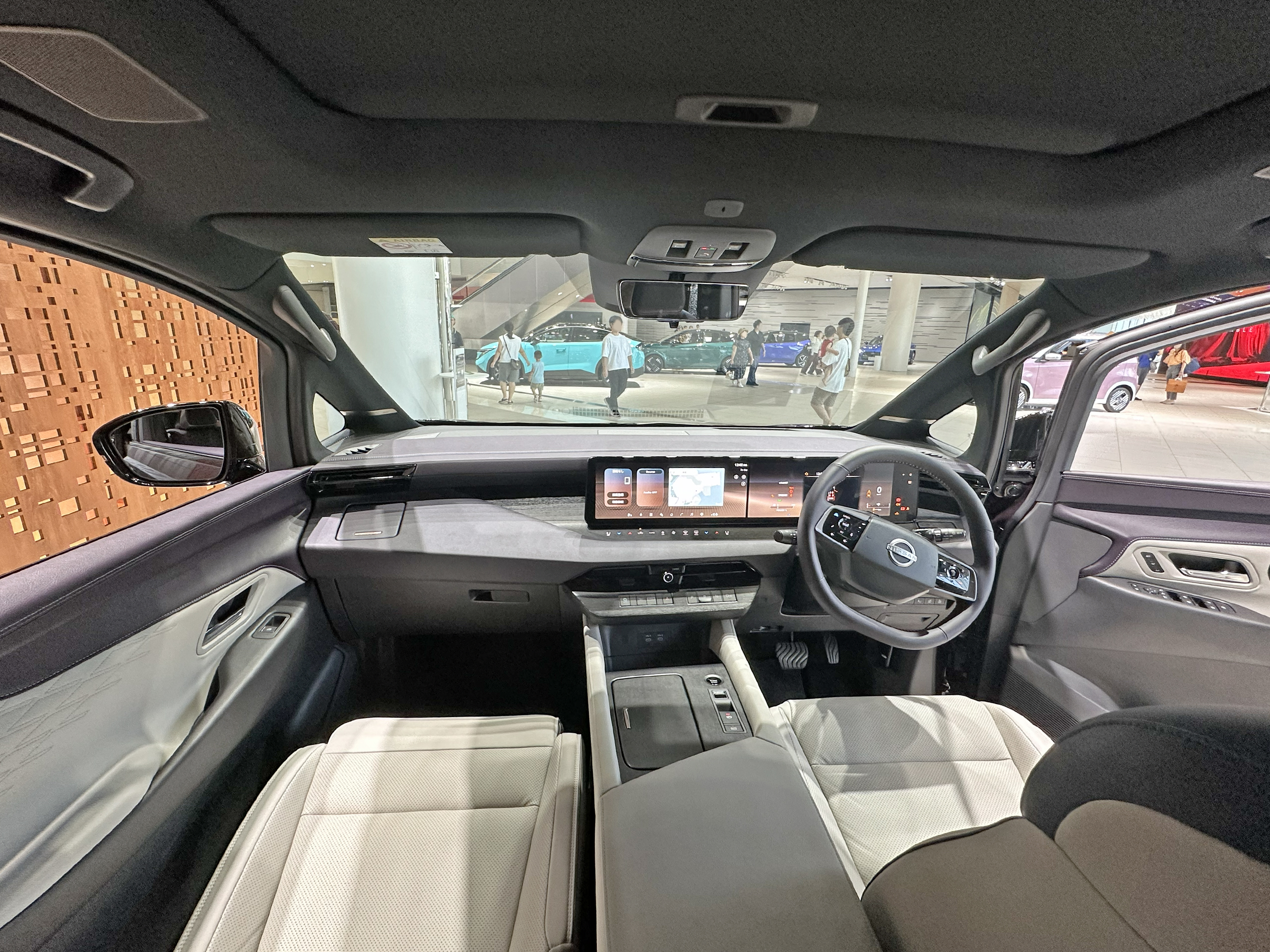
Interior

=== Hyper Tourer Concept ===
The Hyper Tourer Concept was showcased on 17 October 2023 at 2023 Japan Mobility Show, which previewed the fourth-generation Elgrand.

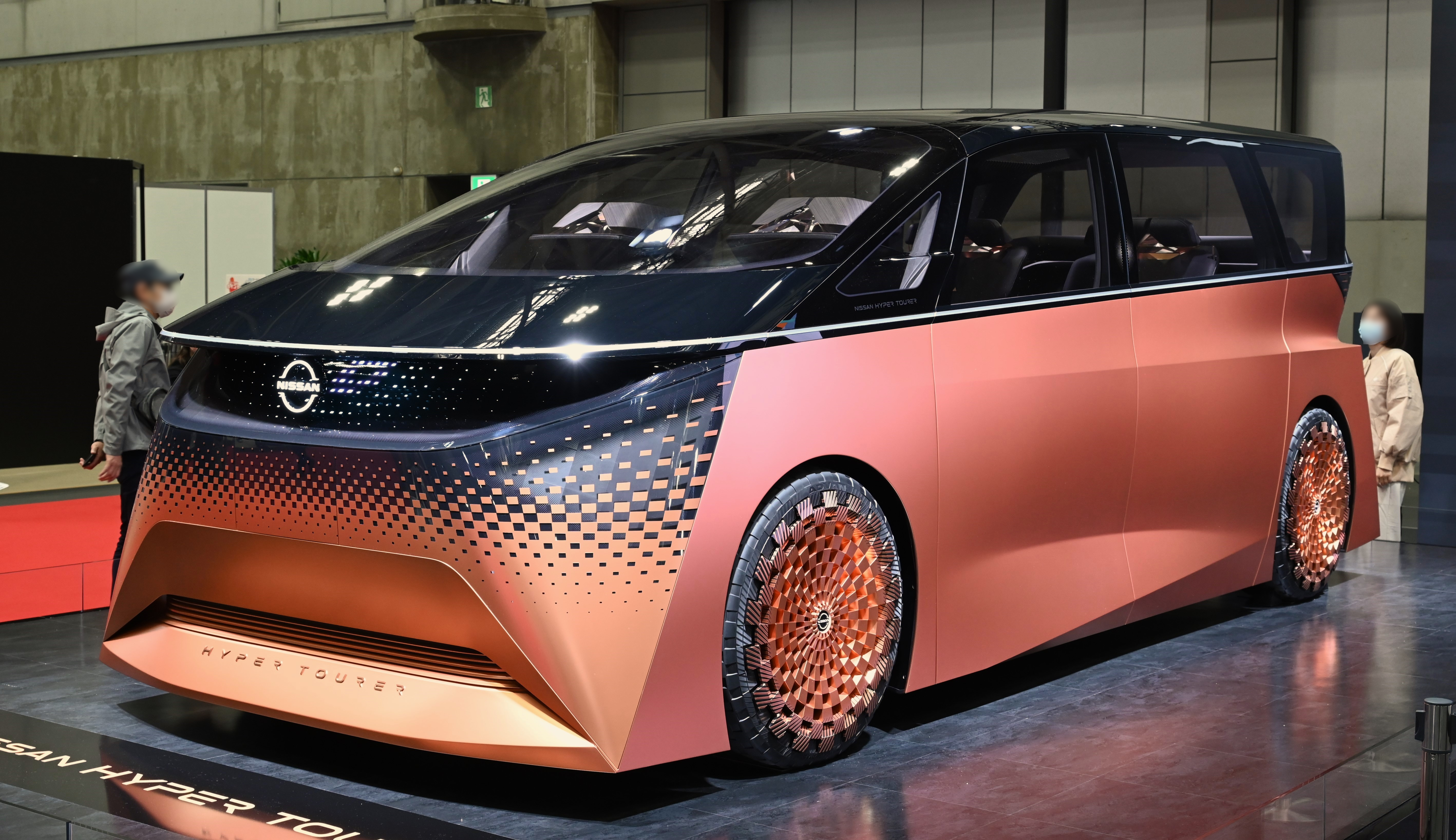
Nissan Hyper Tourer concept (front)

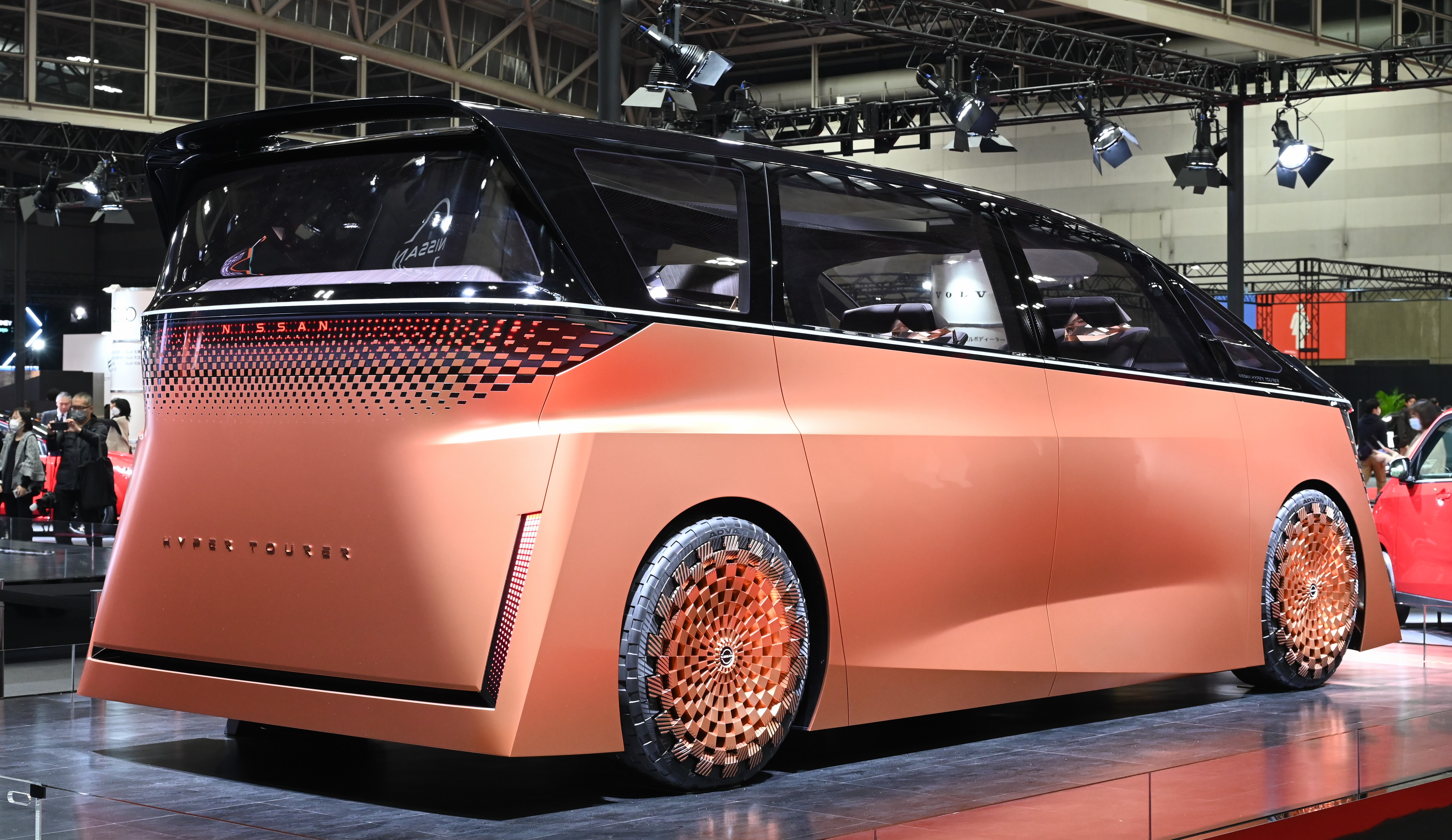
Nissan Hyper Tourer concept (rear)

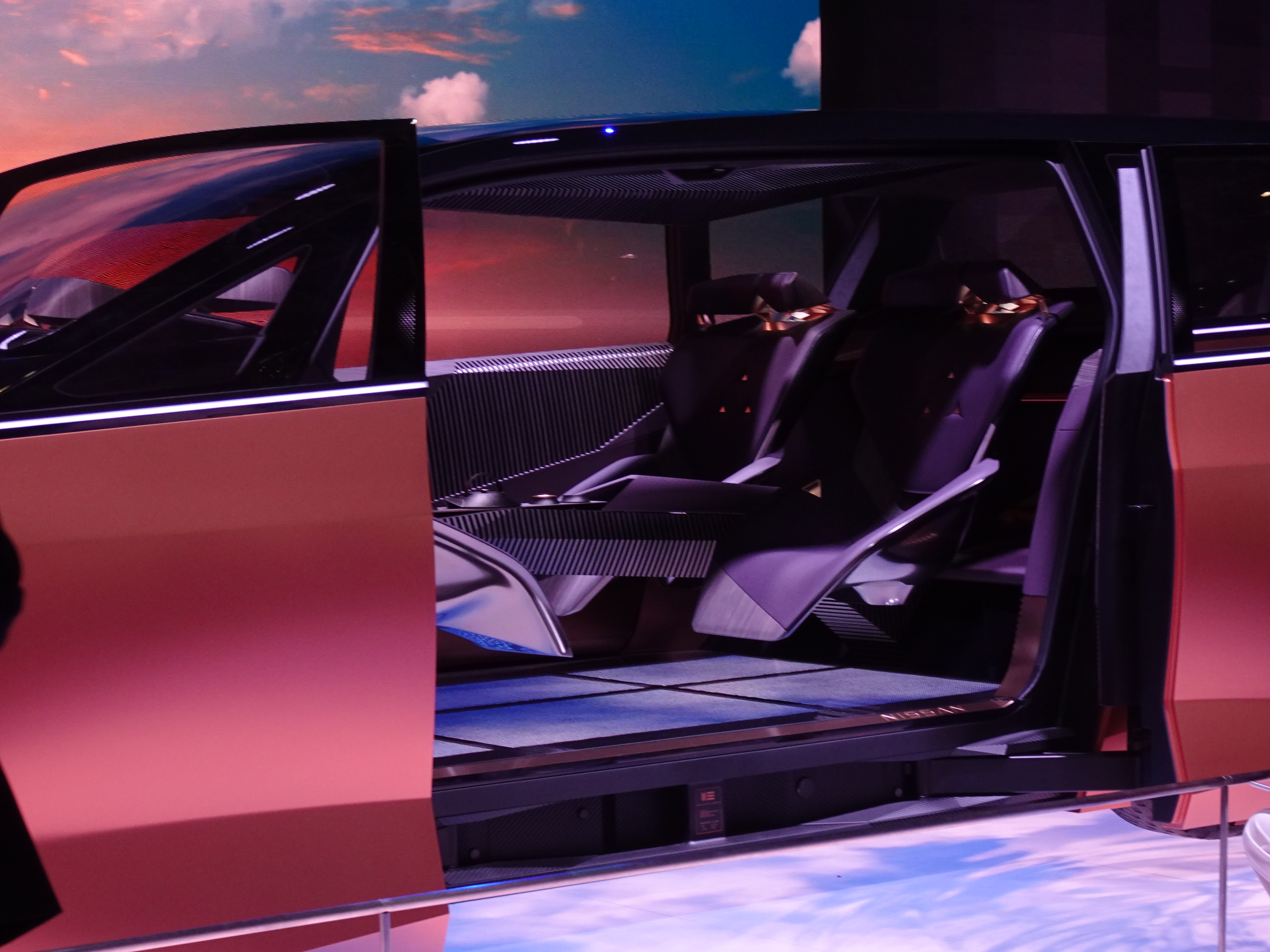
Interior

== International markets ==
There is a strong grey import market emerging for Elgrands in Canada, the United Kingdom, Australia, New Zealand, Russia and previously the Philippines. Growth in these markets is mainly driven by car enthusiasts, or an unfilled need for a seven- or eight- passenger vehicle in that market. In the Philippines, first generation models were converted to left-hand drive and sold before the ban of JDM vehicles.

In Hong Kong, E50 was imported in limited numbers, while the E51, E52 and E53 is currently mass-imported. All three generations are sold officially by Nissan dealers.

In the United Kingdom, most Elgrands are imported for resale through specialist Japanese car import agents or dealerships. There is also a growing market in self-importing Elgrands by either purchasing directly through Japanese car auctions or online dealers.

In Australia, Elgrands are popular imports and are imported from Japanese import agents and special dealerships.

In Indonesia, the third-generation Elgrand was launched at the beginning of 2011. The Elgrand for that market is equipped with the 3.5L V6 petrol engine. The 2.5L 4-cylinder model was released in September 2012.

In Thailand, the fourth-generation Elgrand was launched in 9 November 2026, sales beginning on 1 December 2026. It is available in a two variants: Standard and RSE, equivalent to the Japanese spec G variant.

In Singapore, the second-generation Elgrand was launched in February 2009, while the third-generation Elgrand was launched in March 2012. The fourth-generation Elgrand was previewed in September 2026 during the unveiling of one of Nissan's newly renovated dealership.

== Sales ==
Year	Japan
1997	45,179
1998	55,775
1999	51,521
2000	41,203
2001	31,712
2002	40,439
2003	35,865
2004	31,314
2005	42,823
2006	22,872
2007	18,328
2008	15,807
2009	7,059
2010	20,045
2011	17,673
2012	17,366
2013	10,775
2014	10,987
2015	7,909
2016	6,987
2017	8,162
2018	7,313
2019	6,729
2020	3,652
2021	3,513
2022	2,214
2023	2,255
2024	1,300
2025	1,426
