= Nissan Caravan =

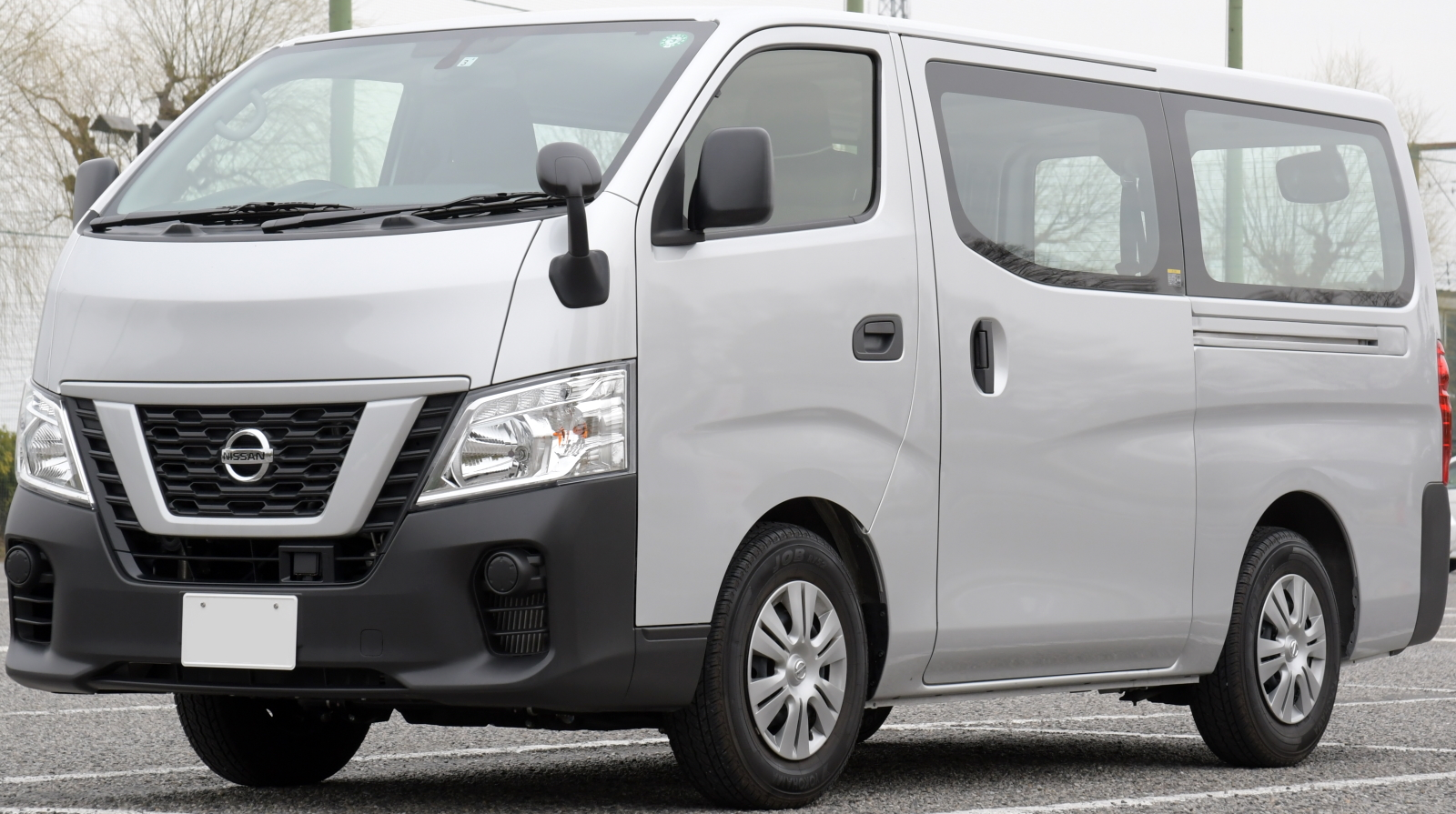
- Nissan NV350 Caravan DX with dual sliding door (Japan)

Overview
- Manufacturer: Nissan
- Also called: Nissan Urvan; Datsun Urvan; Nissan NV350
- Production: 1965–1999 (Nissan Homy); 1973–present (Nissan Caravan)

Body and chassis
- Class: Light commercial vehicle
- Body style: 4/5-door van
- Layout: Front-engine, rear-wheel-drive; Front-engine, four-wheel-drive (1987–present)

Chronology
- Predecessor: Nissan Caball (cargo/passenger van); Isuzu Fargo (Isuzu models); Nissan NV (North America); Mitsubishi Delica Cargo (Mitsubishi models)

The Nissan Caravan is a light commercial van designed for use as a fleet vehicle or cargo van and manufactured by Nissan since 1973. Between 1976 and 1999, a rebadged version of the Caravan sold as the Nissan Homy, which was introduced as an independent model in 1965. Outside Japan, the Caravan was also sold as either the Nissan Urvan or Nissan King Van, or earlier with Datsun badging.

Prior to 1973, the Caravan's twin, the Homy, had been offered as a standalone generation from 1965 until 1976. The Homy was built and sold by the Prince Motor Company before the merger of Nissan in 1965 and the Homy was the first vehicle to be acquired by Nissan. After the merger in August 1966, because Nissan didn't have a large passenger platform, the Prince Homy was "badge engineered" as the Caravan, and the brand name was changed from Prince to Nissan. The merger was complete by 1970. It shared a chassis with the Prince Homer, a medium-duty cabover pickup truck.

The second generation Homy of 1976, was marketed as a twin to the 1973-era Nissan Caravan, sold at the Nissan Prince Store dealerships, while the Caravan was exclusive to Nissan Store locations. The first generation series B640 which was changed to Nissan series T20 was built from 1965 to 1976, the second generation E20 was built from 1976 to 1980, and the third generation E23 was built from 1980 to 1986. The final generation E24 was built from 1986 to 1999, and replaced by the Nissan Elgrand.

Mechanically, the Nissan Caravan and the Nissan Homy were identical. Its traditional competitor from Toyota is the HiAce. All generations use a cabover approach to maximize interior space while remaining within defined exterior dimensions.

Nissan's largest passenger van (or minibus) is the Nissan Civilian, introduced in 1959, and their smaller platform was the Nissan Vanette.

== Predecessor (1965–1973) ==
Prince/Nissan Homy
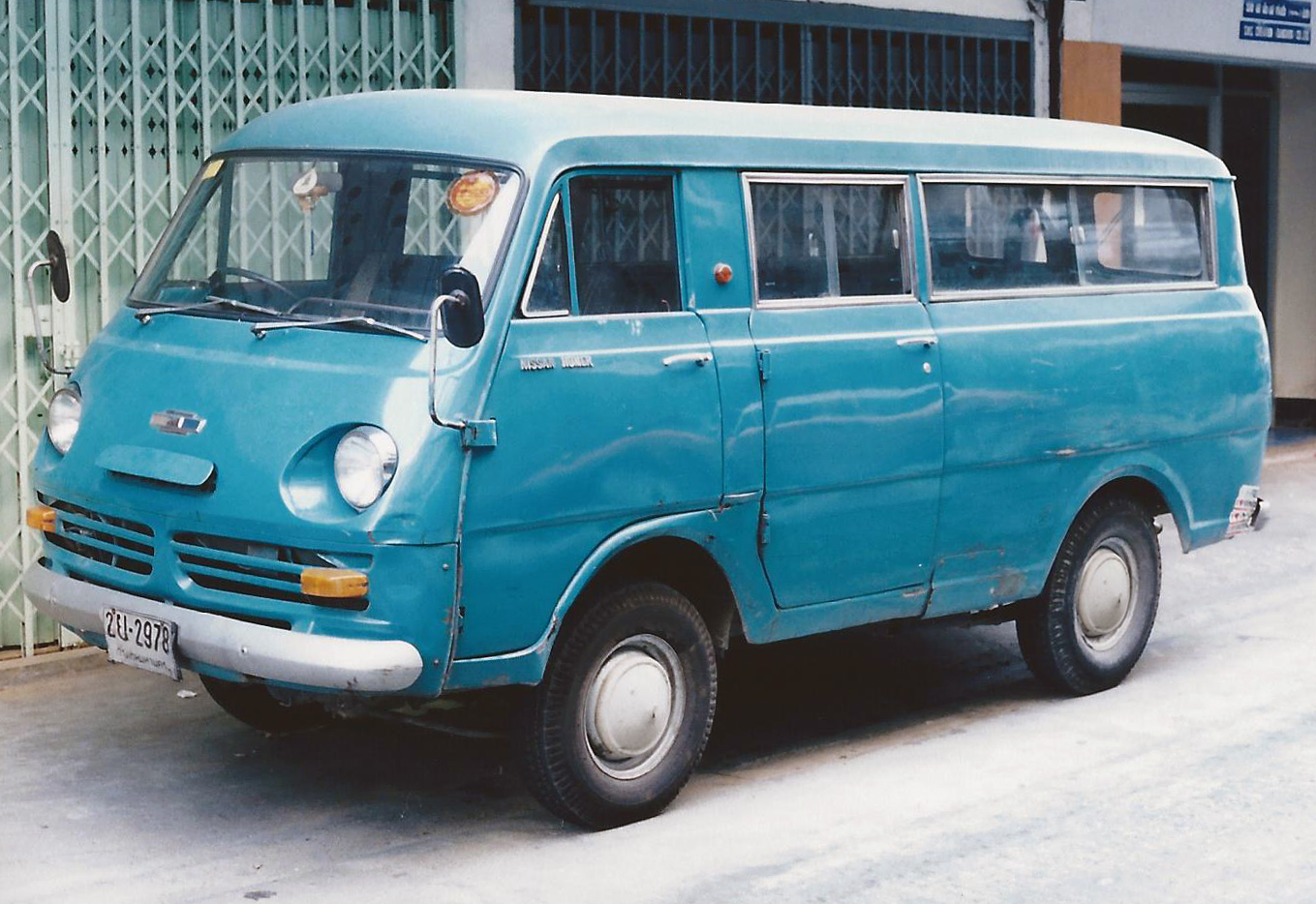
- First generation Nissan Prince Homy (Thailand), sold as Nissan Homer

Overview
- Model code: B640
- Production: October 1965 – February 1973

Powertrain
- Engine: 1.6 L J16 OHV I4

Dimensions
- Wheelbase: 2,130–2,470 mm (83.9–97.2 in)
- Length: 4,325–4,690 mm (170.3–184.6 in)
- Width: 1,690 mm (66.5 in)
- Height: 1,900 mm (74.8 in)
- Curb weight: 1,190 kg (2,624 lb)

The Prince Homy (B640) was the passenger van version of the Prince Homer light duty truck, and had a seating capacity of up to 15 people. In 1966 as the Prince-Nissan merger began, it was initially called the Nissan Homy Prince, sharing load carrying duties with the Prince Skyway, and Prince Gloria station wagons; the Prince name became a dealership network within the Nissan organization in 1970. The Nissan Homy received the T20 model code; it was sold as the Nissan Homer in most export markets. In 1972 the microbus variants were reclassified as commercial vehicle in order to comply with the 1970 Japanese road traffic law. The Homy minibuses were discontinued in 1973, but the related Homer trucks and panel vans continued to be built until 1976.

Nissan had integrated a previously built product called the Nissan Caball as a cabover truck and cargo van, but replaced it with the Homy. The Homer has a 1.6-litre overhead valve engine producing 80 PS (59 kW), enough for a top speed of 110 km/h (68 mph) for the most common truck variants.

== First generation (E20, E21, E22); (1973) ==
Caravan (E20)
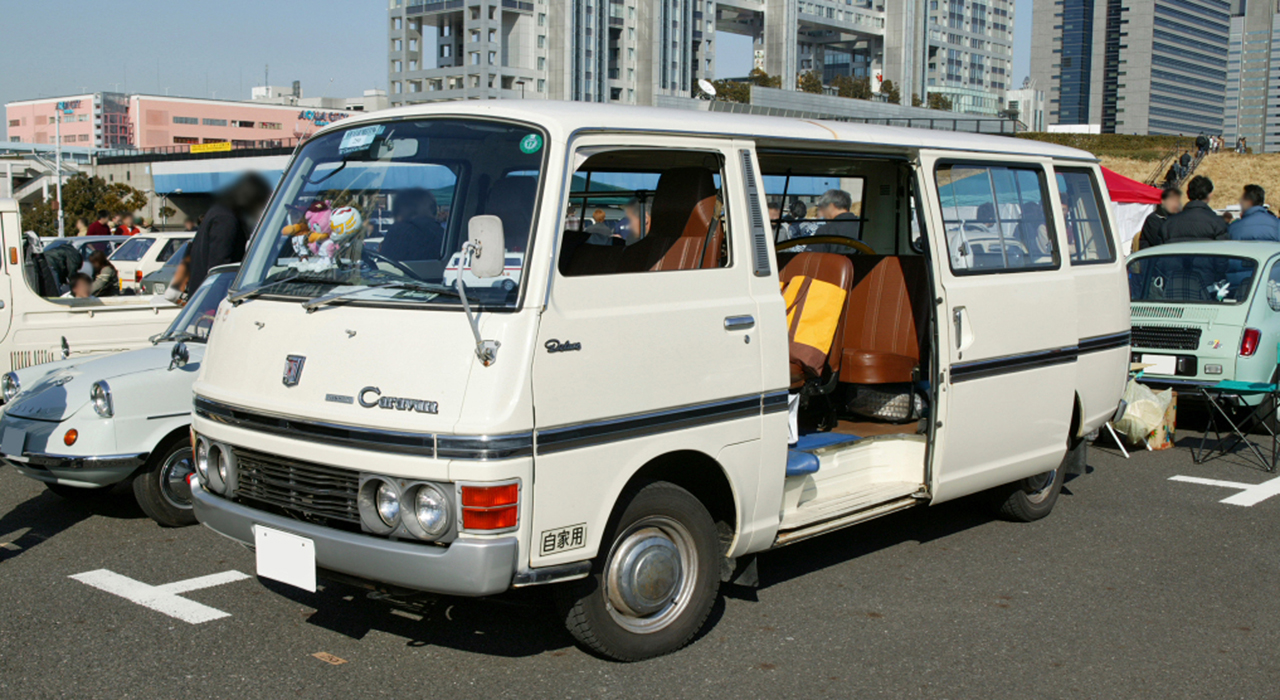

Overview
- Also called: Datsun Urvan; Nissan Homy
- Production: March 1973 – July 1980

Powertrain
- Engine: Petrol: 1483 cc J15 OHV I4 (SE20); 1567 cc J16 OHV I4 (E20); 1982 cc H20 OHV I4 (PE20); Diesel: 2164 cc SD22 OHV I4 (RE20)

Dimensions
- Wheelbase: 2,350 mm (92.5 in)
- Length: 4,690 mm (184.6 in)
- Width: 1,690 mm (66.5 in)
- Height: 1,905 mm (75.0 in)
- Curb weight: 1,425 kg (3,142 lb)

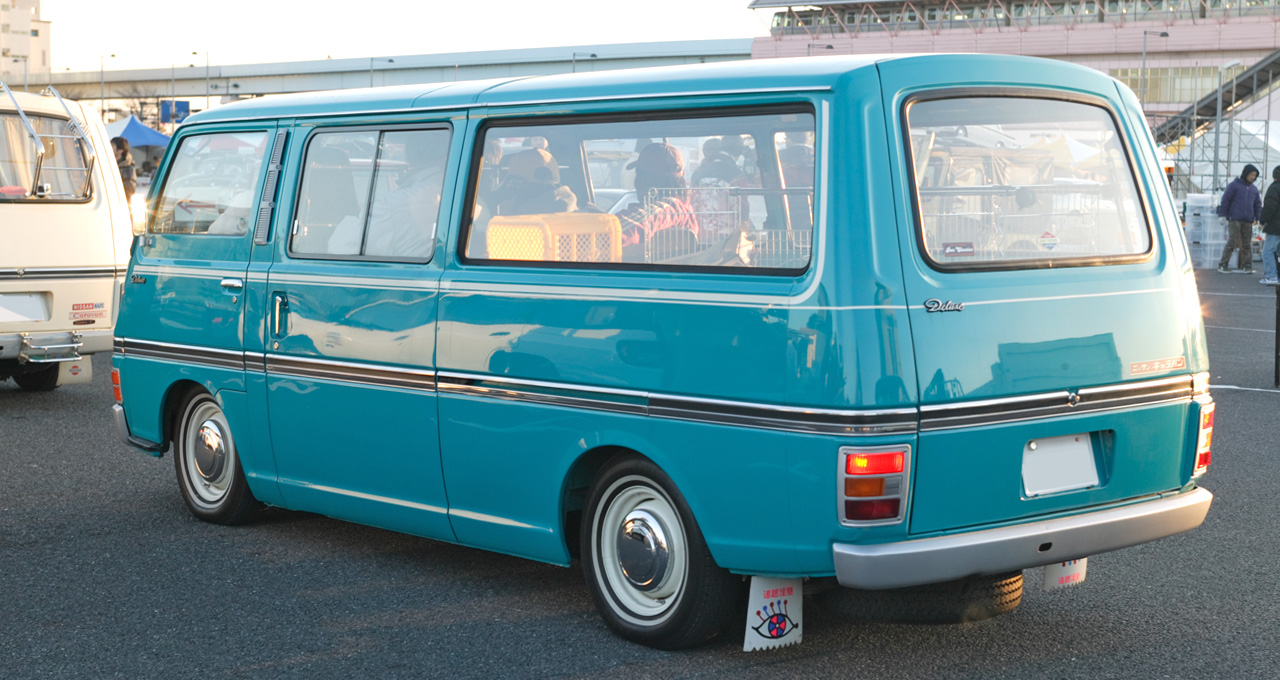
Nissan Caravan (E20)

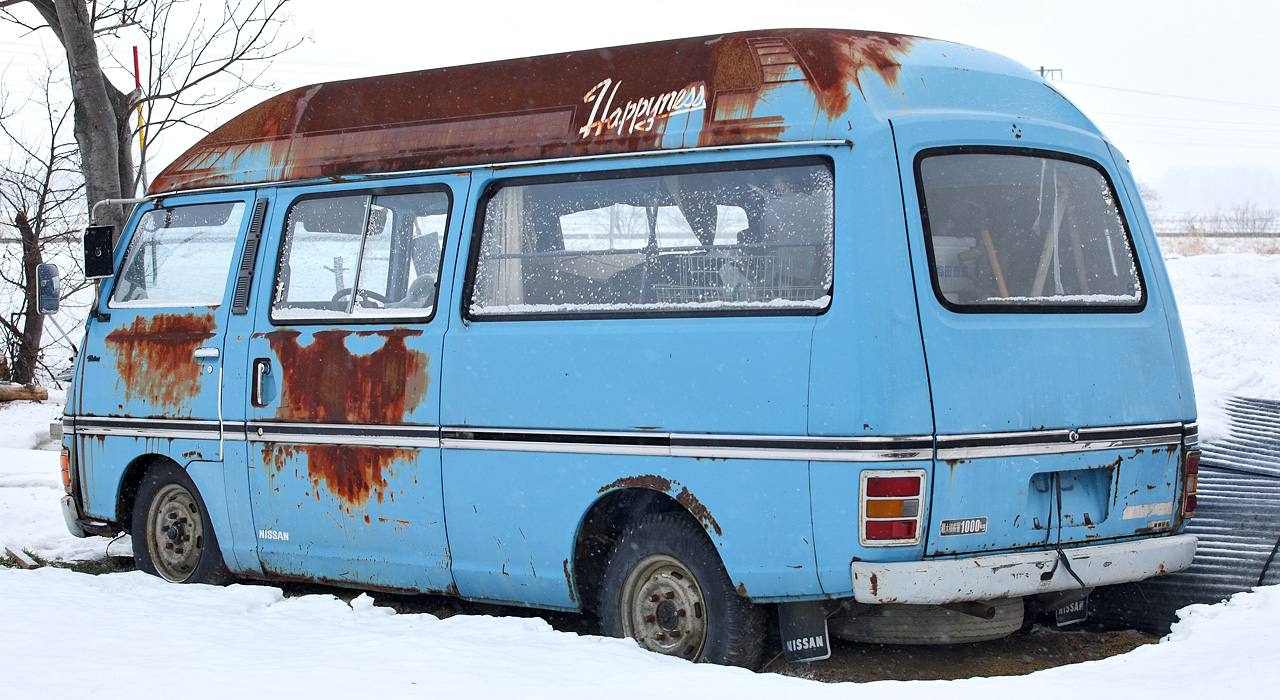
Nissan Homy (E20)

The E20 series Caravan and Urvan van and minibus were manufactured from February 1973 with seating configurations for three, five, seven, and up to 10 passengers. It was exclusive in Japan to Nissan Store, while its twin the Nissan Homy was exclusive to Nissan Prince Store locations. It was especially popular in Europe, and was again very popular with fire departments and as ambulances in certain countries. It had a somewhat difficult handling, as it was heavy to steer, and was not available with power steering. Also, the gear shifter was located at the floor and went all the way up to the height of the hand, and had a slight curve. The gear shifter was nearly 80 cm (2.6 ft) long, so it was somewhat clumsy to shift, but it came with five gears, unusual in Europe at that time.

It was delivered with a 1.5-, 1.6-, and 2.0-liter petrol engines, as well as a later 2.2-liter diesel unit. It was produced until replaced by the E23 Caravan in August 1980. In export markets the first and second generations were called Datsun Urvan, until the Nissan brand replaced it worldwide in 1983 and 1984. In 1978, Nissan added the smaller Vanette as the Caravan grew in dimensions and market positioning.

In South Africa the second generation E20 was made all the way to 1996 with 77,000 units sold, it received a few upgrades including redesigned bumpers from 1984 and square headlights, 5-speed gearbox and the H20 engine was replaced by an L18 motor with twin Hitachi carburetors from 1981 till final production in 1996.

Nissan Homy

The second generation Homy was a rebadged Caravan sold through Nissan Prince Stores beginning in January 1976; there were no mechanical differences between the two.

== Second generation (E23; 1980) ==
Caravan (E23)
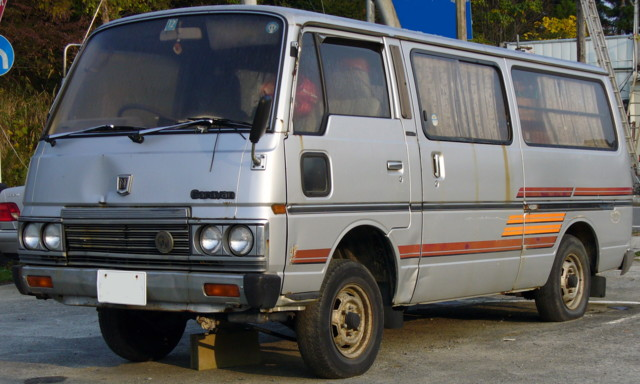
- Nissan Caravan (E23) LWB

Overview
- Also called: Datsun Caravan/Urvan (until 1983); Nissan Homy; Nissan Urvan; Yulon Homer (Taiwan)
- Production: August 1980 – July 1986

Body and chassis
- Related: Nissan Atlas; Nissan Cabstar; FAW Jiefang CA 6440 (1994–2000)

Powertrain
- Engine: Petrol: 1.6 L J16 OHV I4; 1.8 L Z18S I4; 2.0 L H20 OHV I4; 2.0 L Z20S I4; Diesel: 2.0 L LD20T turbo I4; 2.2 L SD22 I4; 2.3 L SD23 I4

Dimensions
- Wheelbase: SWB: 2,350 mm (92.5 in); LWB: 2,690 mm (105.9 in)
- Length: SWB: 4,350 mm (171.3 in); LWB: 4,690 mm (184.6 in)
- Width: 1,690 mm (66.5 in)
- Height: 1,950 mm (76.8 in)
- Curb weight: 1,930 kg (4,255 lb)

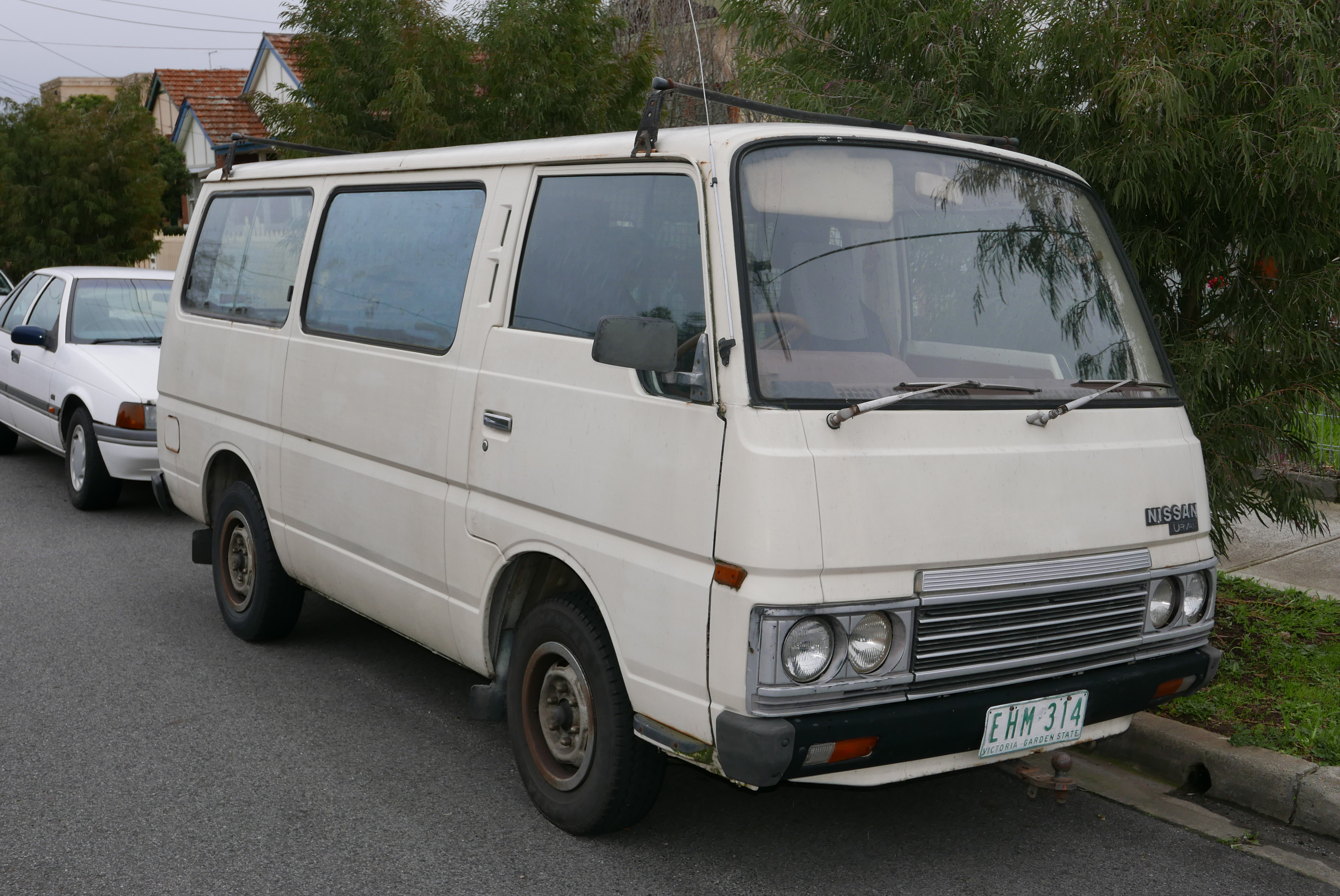

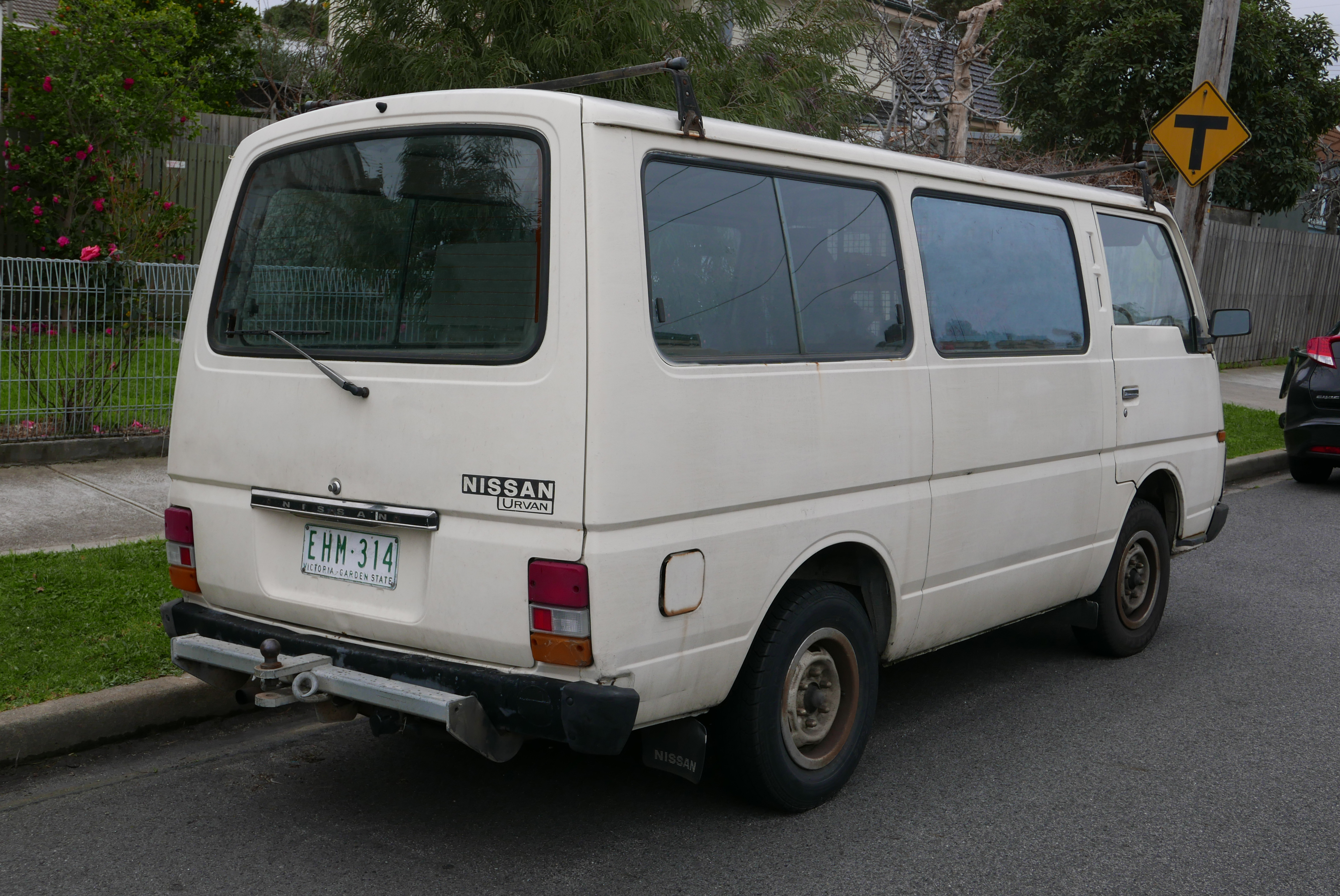
1985 Nissan Urvan (E23) SWB (Australia)

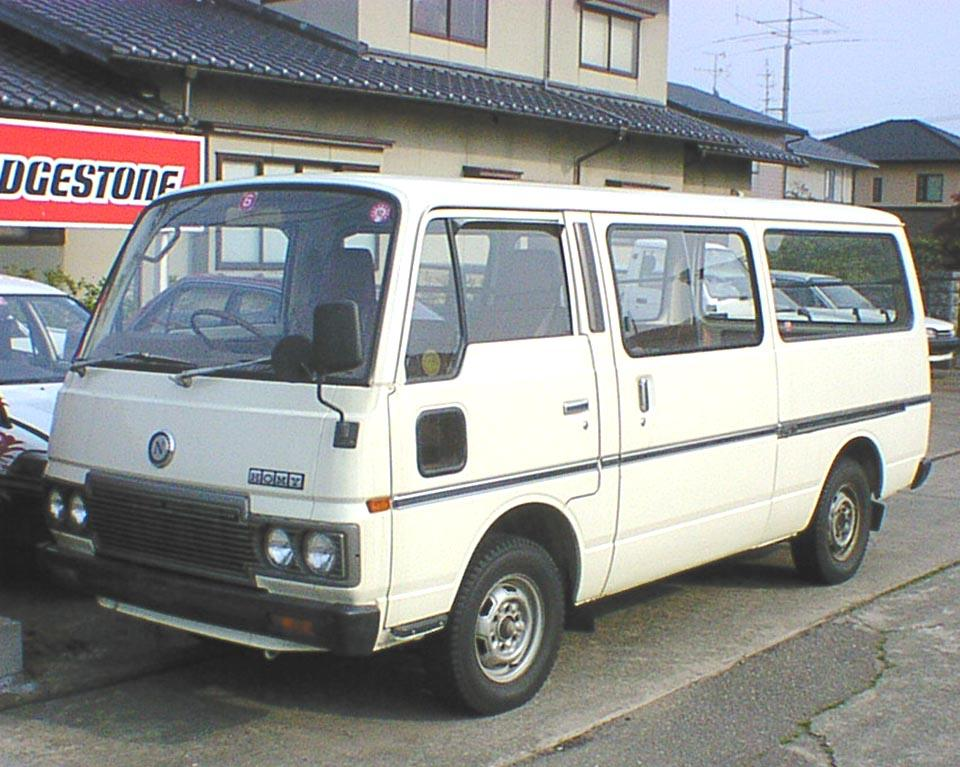
Nissan Homy (E23) LWB

The third generation Nissan Urvan/Caravan, the E23 series, was introduced in August 1980. As before, the Homy, sold through Prince dealerships, was its twin model, set apart by a different grille. The Cabstar and Homer shared much of the bodywork, with the main differences being the frontal treatment and a small side window mounted in the front doors of the Caravan/Homy. Engines were all carryover four-cylinders, ranging from the J16 and H20 pushrod items, via the overhead cam Z20S, and an upgraded SD22 diesel. The van versions were now designed to allow access to the loading area from the passenger compartment. Radial tires were optional. The diesel also benefitted from a new five-speed manual gearbox, while the new luxury GL version offered an optional "Nissanmatic" automatic transmission as well as power steering, comfortable rotating rear seats and air conditioning. In July 1981, a luxurious SGL "Silk Road" version was added.

At the 1981 Tokyo Motor Show, two concept Caravans designed to provide limousine-like accommodation for businessmen were shown, the Royal and Elgrand Royal Line. The Elgrand name was to be adopted for a series of luxurious minivans, beginning in 1997. In May 1982, the Caravan underwent a minor facelift, losing the ventilation window in the front doors, receiving a new dashboard and a new five-bearing SD23 diesel engine replacing the previous SD22. Radial tires became standard for all but the cheapest versions. For more power, coach versions also became available with the turbocharged LD20T diesel. The luxurious "Silk Road" version, with seven captain seats, was only available with the LD20T. This engine passed the 1982 emissions standards for diesel cars. To meet the 1981 emissions standards for petrol cars, coach versions replaced the H20 engine with the new carbureted Z18S and 105 PS (77 kW) Z20S.

In April 1983, there was another light facelift, with SGL and GL versions receiving a new look with four square headlights. An LWB DX ten-seater version was also added. In January 1985, six and nine-passenger van versions were added. Diesel versions received improved pre-heating systems and safety equipment was improved. Manual petrol versions were now all five-speed units. An eight-seater "SGL Silk Road Limited" also joined the lineup in May. In September 1986, the E23 was replaced by the third generation E24.

Nissan Homy

The Homy and its Caravan twin received their first full model change since the Homy was introduced in 1965. The engine was the 2.0-liter inline-four LD20T turbo diesel. The TD23 inline-four was also available.

== Third generation (E24; 1986) ==
Caravan (E24)
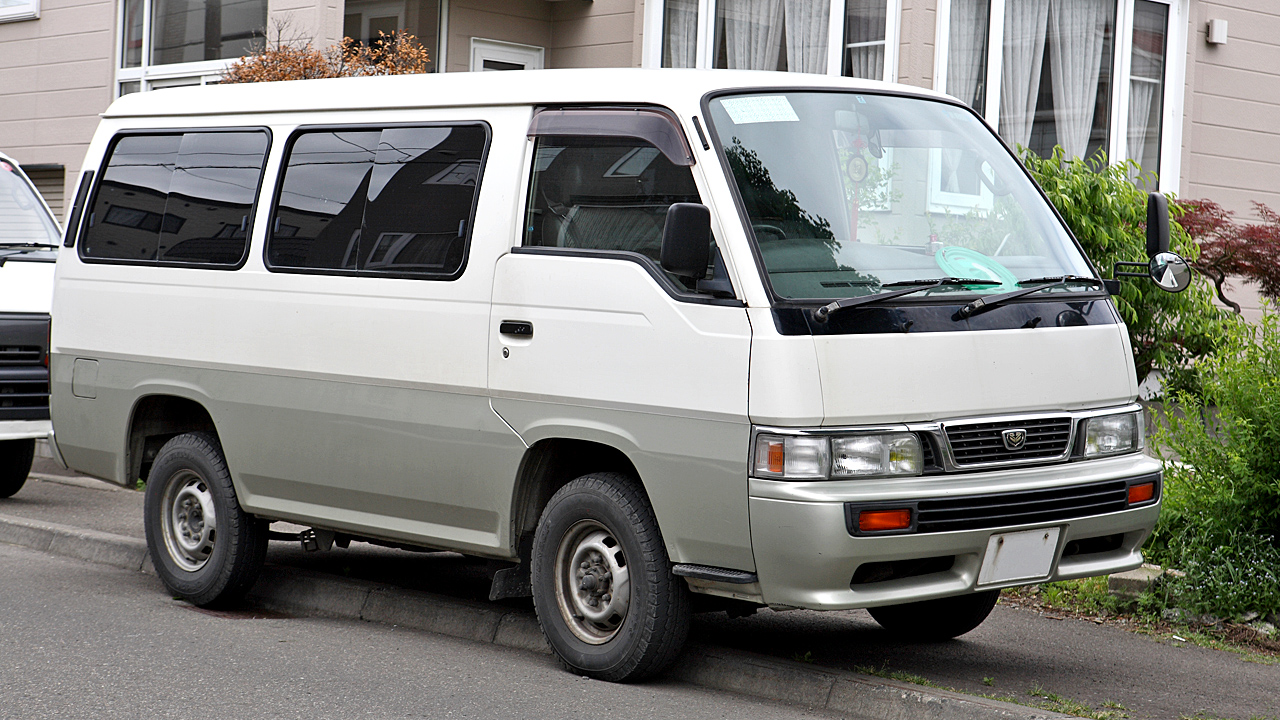

Overview
- Also called: Nissan Homy; Nissan Urvan; Nissan Urvan Escapade; Nissan Urvan Shuttle; Nissan Caravan Homy; Isuzu Fargo; FAW Jiefang CA 6440
- Production: August 1986 – March 2001; August 1992 – May 2015 (Philippines)
- Assembly: Japan: Kanagawa (Nissan Shatai); Philippines: Makati (August 1992–October 2002); Santa Rosa City, Laguna (November 2002–May 2015)

Powertrain
- Engine: Petrol: 1952 cc Z20 I4; 1998 cc NA20S I4; 1998 cc KA20DE I4; 2388 cc KA24DE I4; 2960 cc VG30E V6; Diesel: 1952 cc LD20T II turbo I4; 2289 cc TD23 I4; 2494 cc TD25 I4; 2663 cc TD27 I4; 2663 cc TD27T/Ti/ETi turbo I4; 3153 cc QD32 I4
- Transmission: 4/5-speed manual 4-speed automatic

Dimensions
- Wheelbase: 2,375–2,645 mm (93.5–104.1 in)
- Length: 4,420–5,100 mm (174.0–200.8 in)
- Width: 1,690 mm (66.5 in)
- Height: 1,950–2,395 mm (76.8–94.3 in)
- Curb weight: 1,375–1,930 kg (3,031–4,255 lb)

The E24 version was introduced in September 1986. It remained in production until 2001 and underwent two major facelifts, in 1990 and 1995. In some Scandinavian markets, the E24 series was marketed as the "King Van", to tie it in with the popular "King Cab" version of Nissan's D21 pickup truck. Originally, petrol-equipped Caravans had the Z20 engine while commercial diesels had the 2.3-liter, naturally aspirated TD23 and the Coach (passenger version) the LD20T II turbo-diesel. With the October 1990 facelift this was switched to the NA20S. At the same time, an intercooled version (TD27Ti) of the 2.7-liter turbo-diesel replaced the TD27T in most applications. The facelift consisted of a new grille (not on the DX) and new larger tail lights (excluding the DX and GL models).

In August 1995, there was another facelift, mostly consisting of another new grille. The TD27Ti was upgraded to the electronically controlled TD27ETi. The large QD32 four-cylinder diesel was added to automatic-equipped van models in 1996; it produces 100 PS (74 kW) from 3153 cc. In May 1997, commercial models were upgraded so as to match the changes already introduced on the Coach models. In June 1999, the passenger models (and Homy nameplate) were discontinued and the engine lineup changed: petrol options were now 2.0 and 2.4-liter Twin cam engines from the KA series, while only the naturally aspirated QD32 diesel remained.

Nissan Homy

The Homy received its second full model change in September 1986 and was given the 2.0-liter Z20 engine, as well as the LD20T turbo-diesel. The model code was now E24. In October 1987, four-wheel drive was added to the 2.7-liter TD27 engine. In March 1988, the premium grade "GT Limousine" was offered with the VG30E alongside the 2.7-liter turbo-diesel. Yearly grade changes continued for the rest of the generation, adding items like cruise control, digital speedometers, larger wheels, upgraded interior and upholstery. August 1995 saw the addition of a rebadged Homy sold as the Isuzu Fargo, using the TD27ETi diesel engine. The Homy Coach was replaced by the Nissan Elgrand in 1997 when the Nissan Prince Store Japanese dealerships were renamed Nissan Red Stage and vehicle overlap was streamlined. The Homy badge, first used in 1965, remained in use for commercial models until it, too, was cancelled in June 1999 as the Homy/Caravan lineups were merged.

FAW Jiefang CA 6440

FAW Jiefang made a clone of the E24 known as the CA 6440. Production started in 1994, having a Chrysler-based CA488 engine with a 5-speed manual transmission. According to the "Regulations on Beijing Road Traffic Management" and the "Regulations on the Implementation of the Law of the People's Republic of China on the Prevention and Control of Air Pollution," such vehicles still in service are not allowed to enter Beijing after 10 May 2001 as part of an effort to combat air pollution.

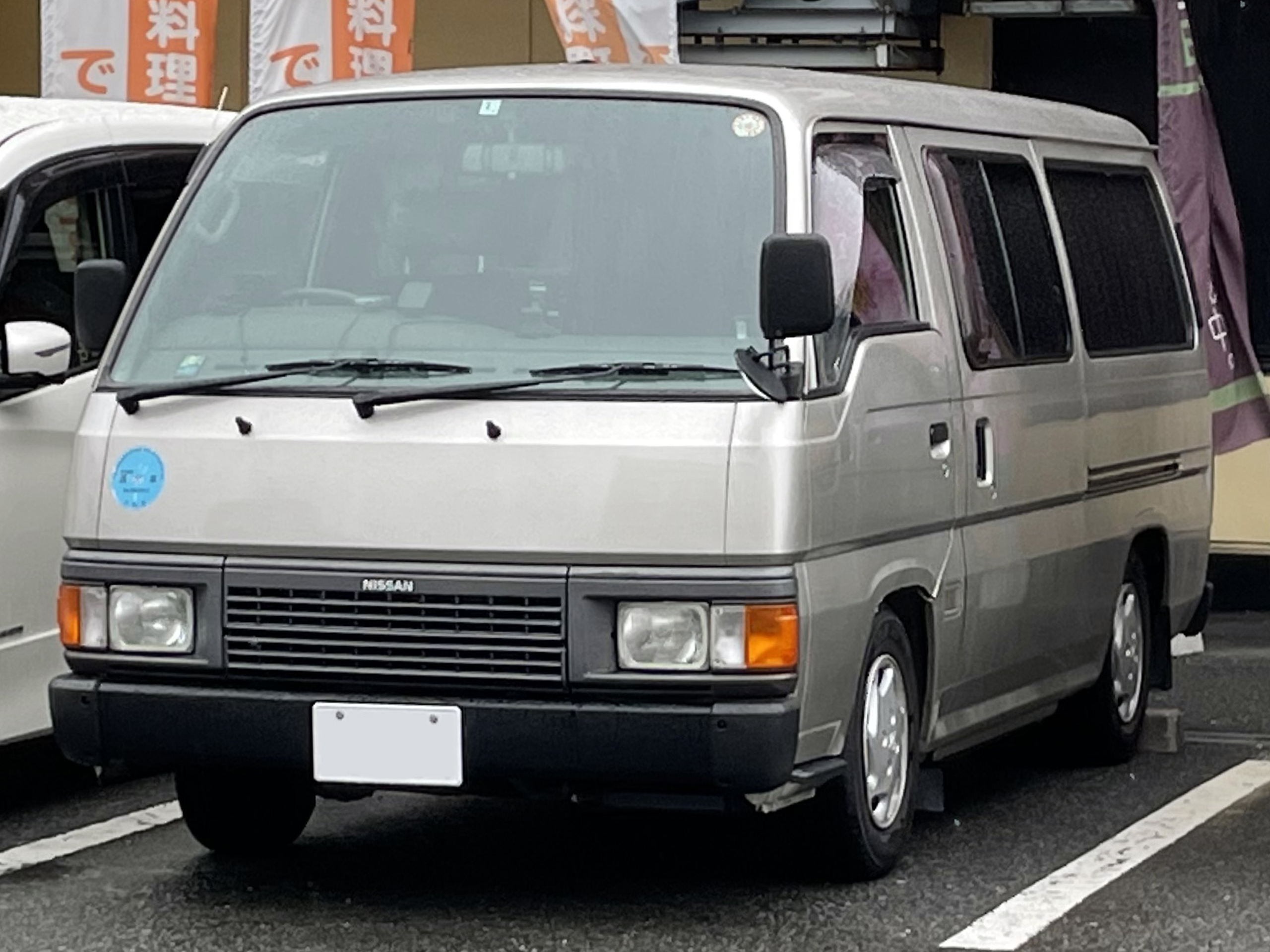
E24 Caravan

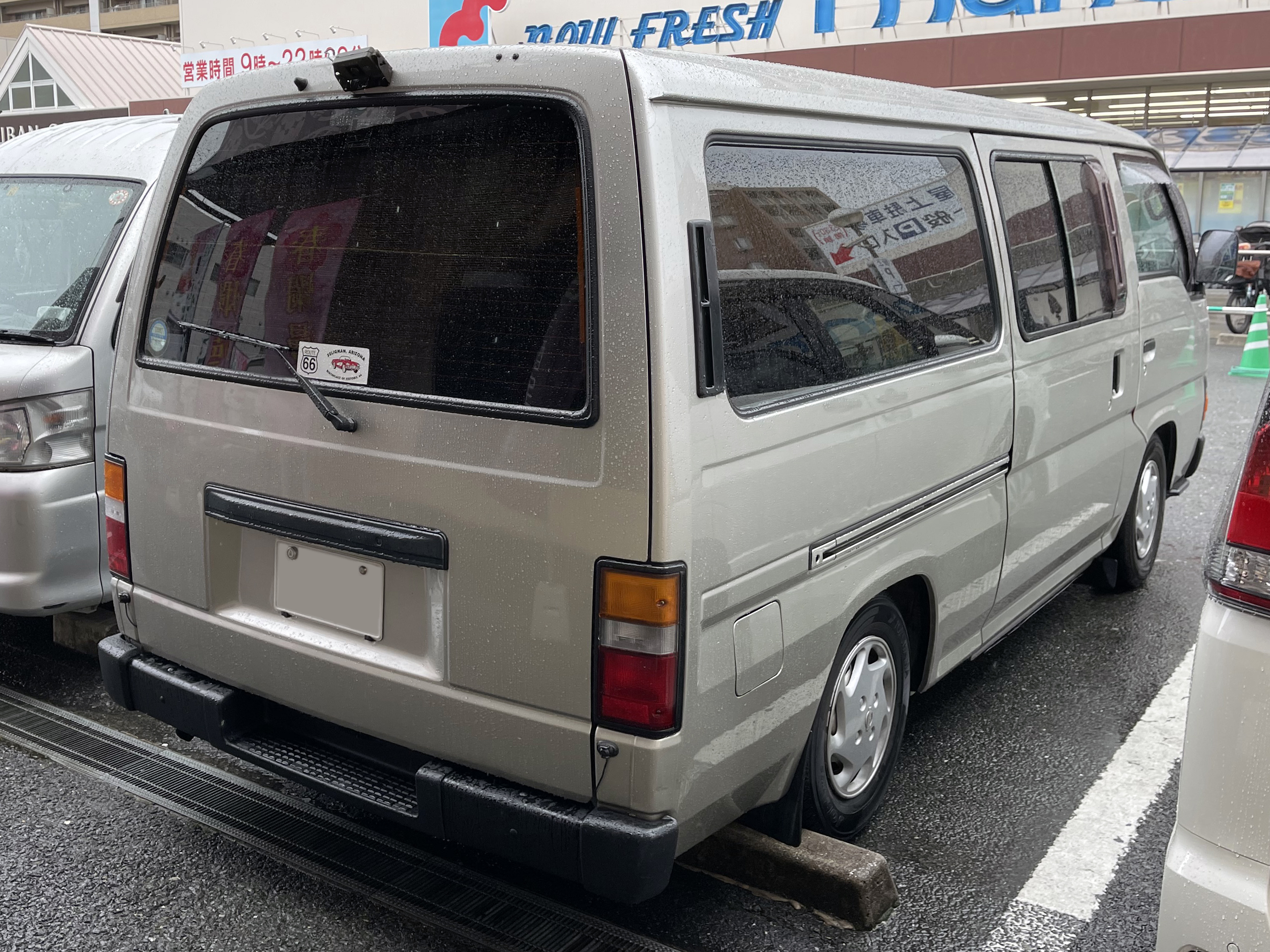
E24 Caravan

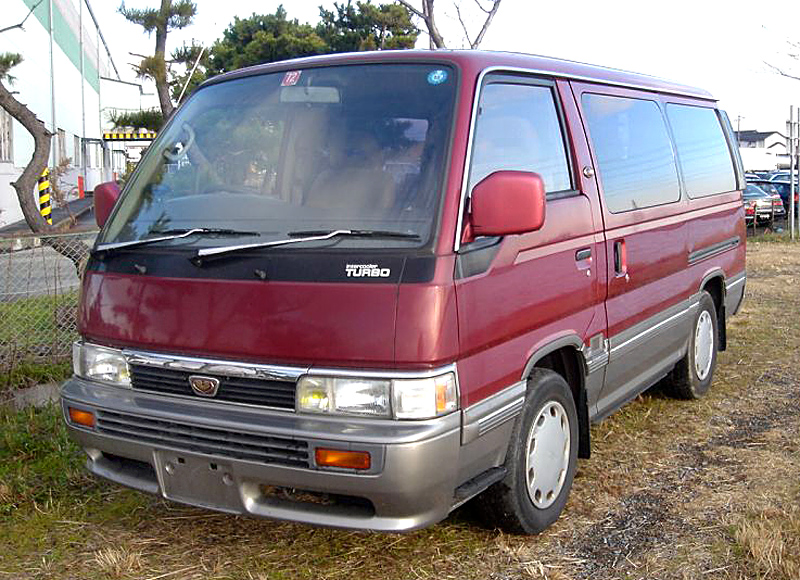
E24 Caravan wagon

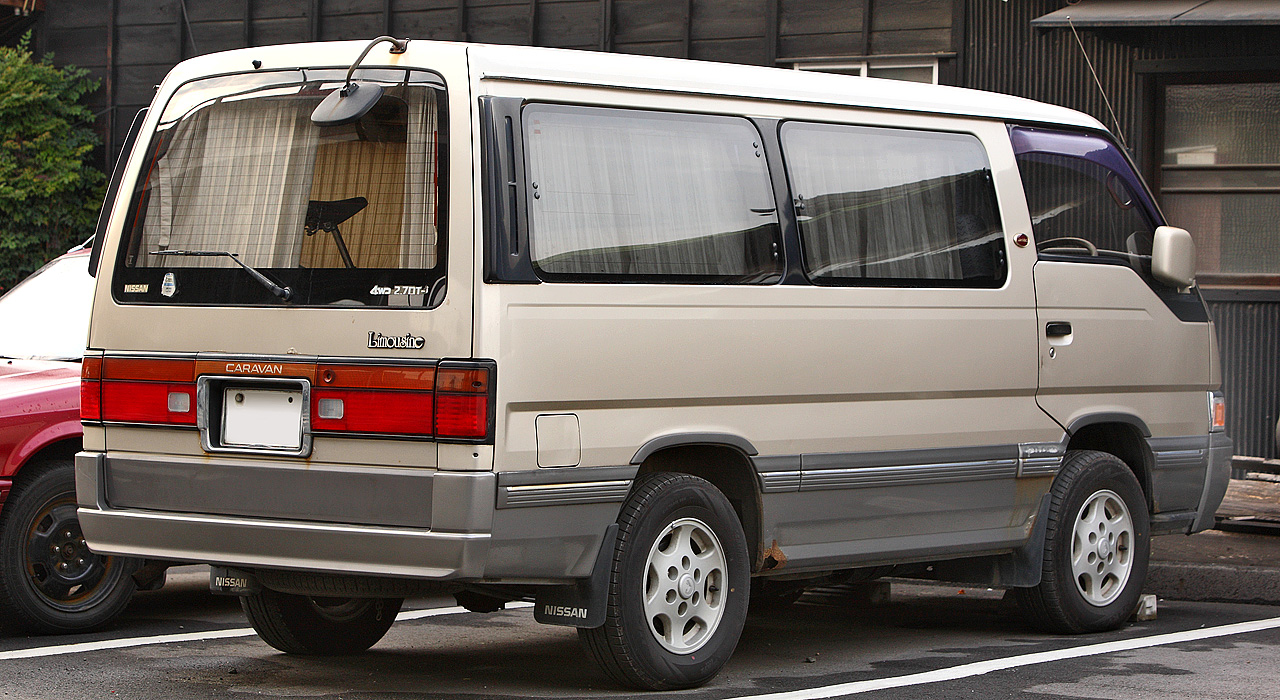
E24 Caravan Limousine

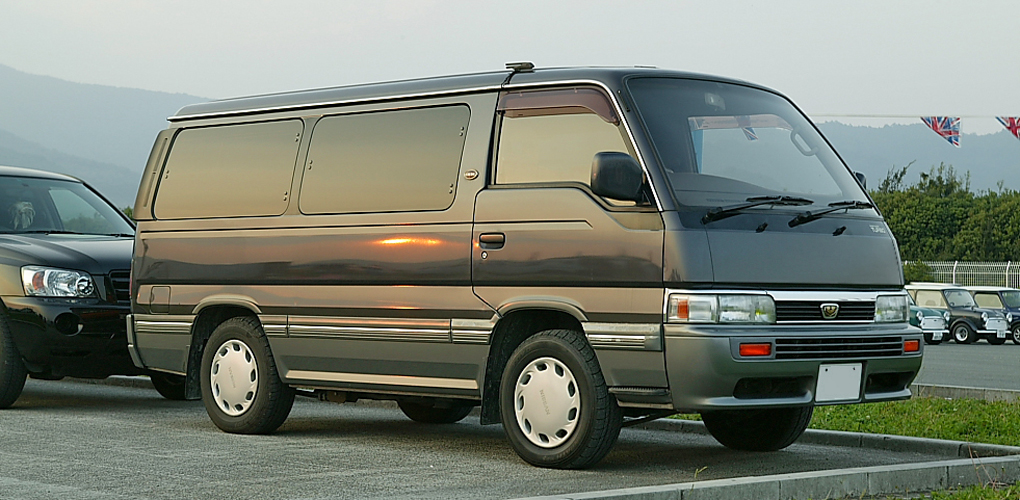
Nissan Homy (E24)

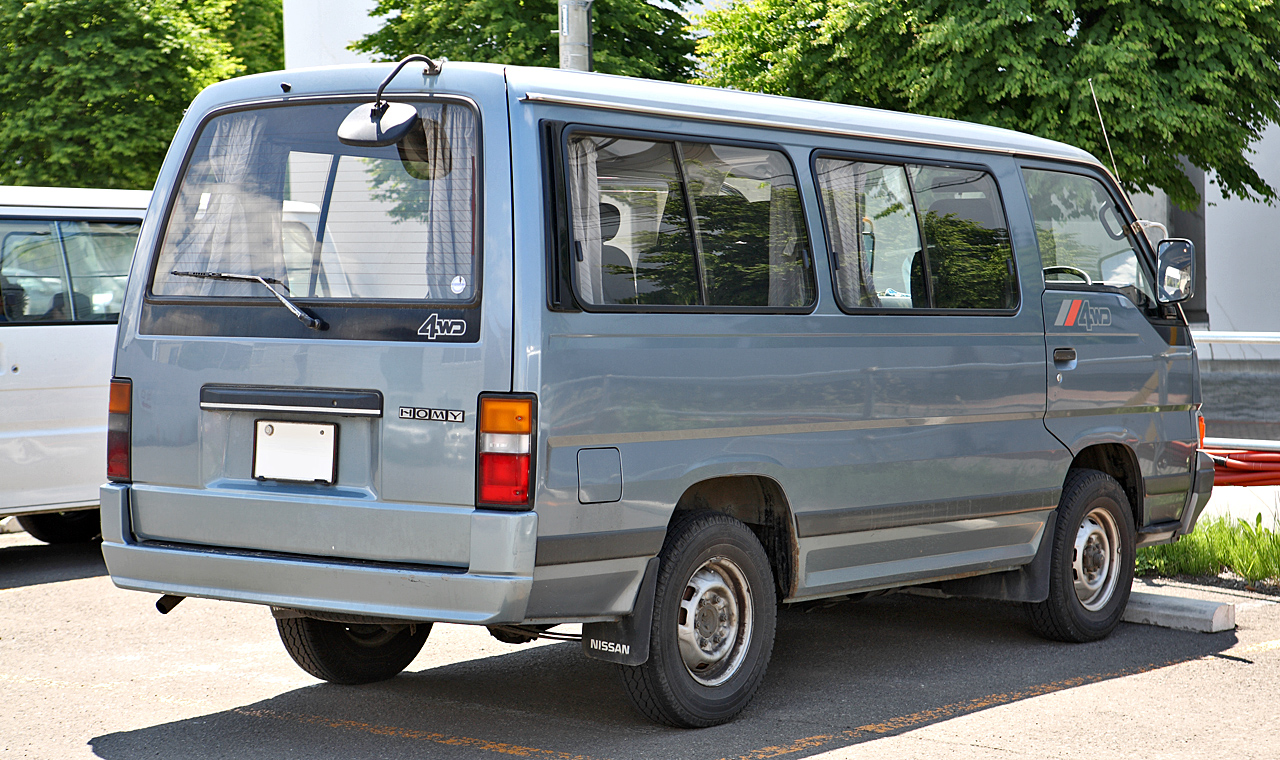
Nissan Homy (E24)

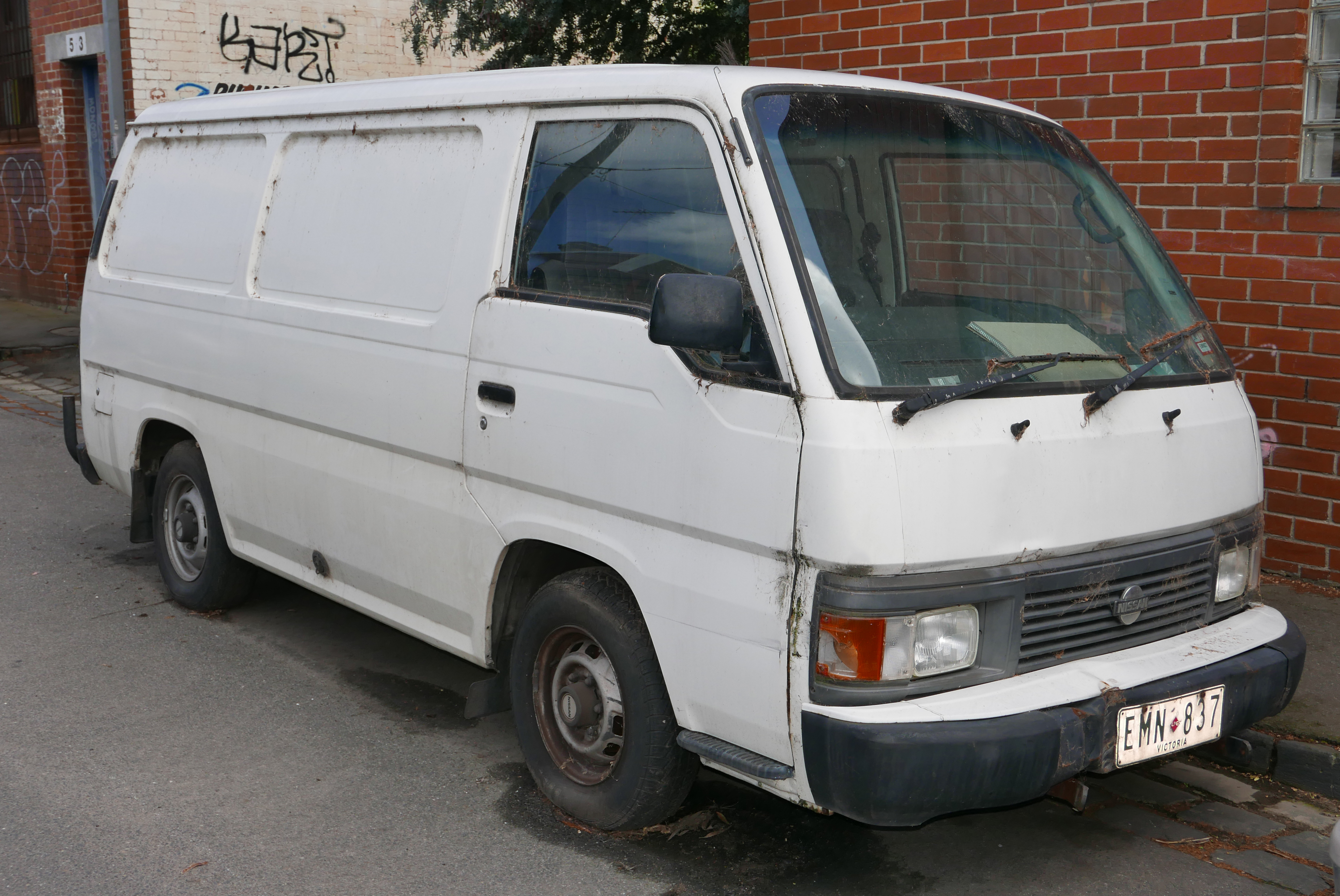
Nissan Urvan Cargo SWB (E24)

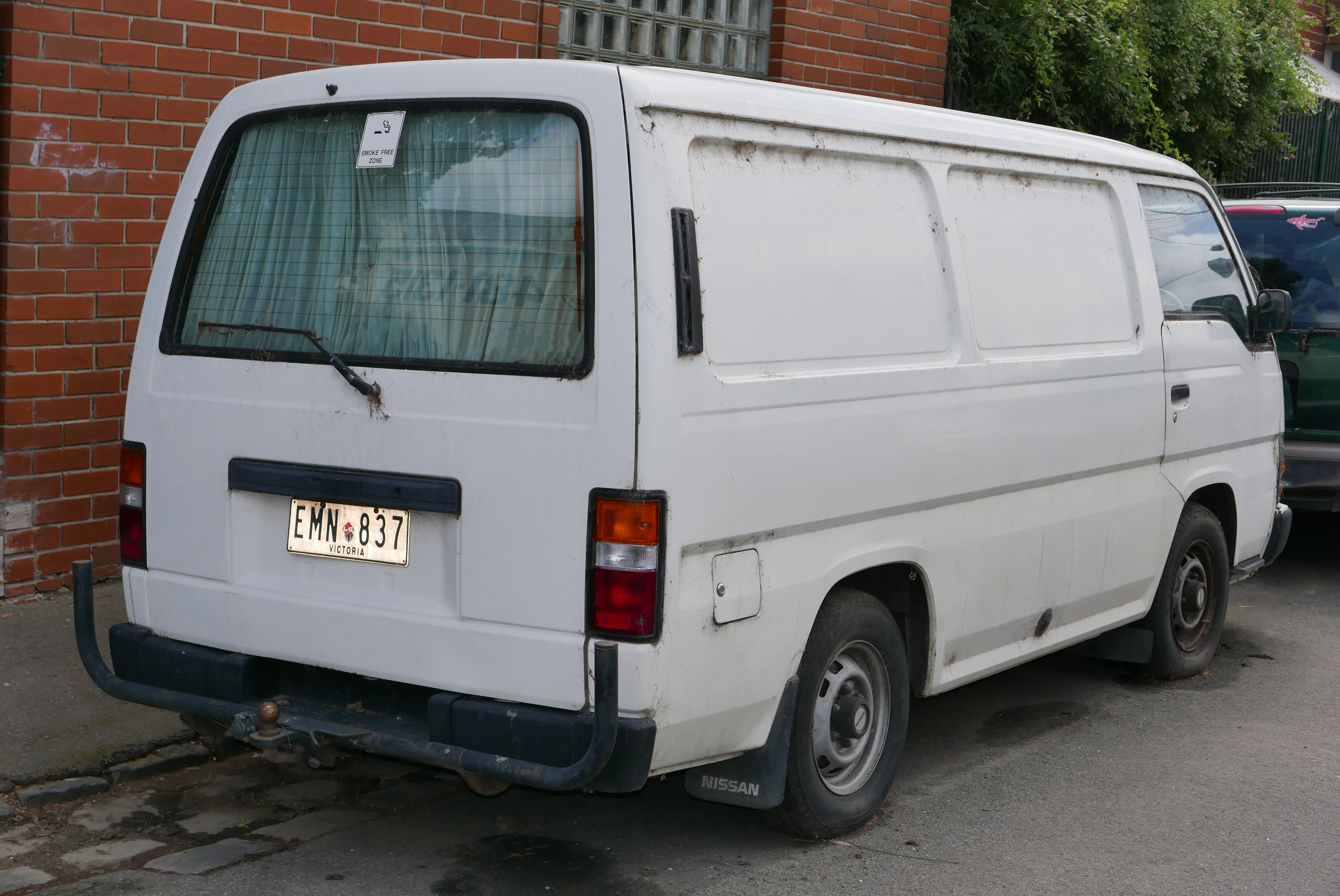
Nissan Urvan Cargo SWB (E24)

== Fourth generation (E25; 2001) ==
Caravan (E25)
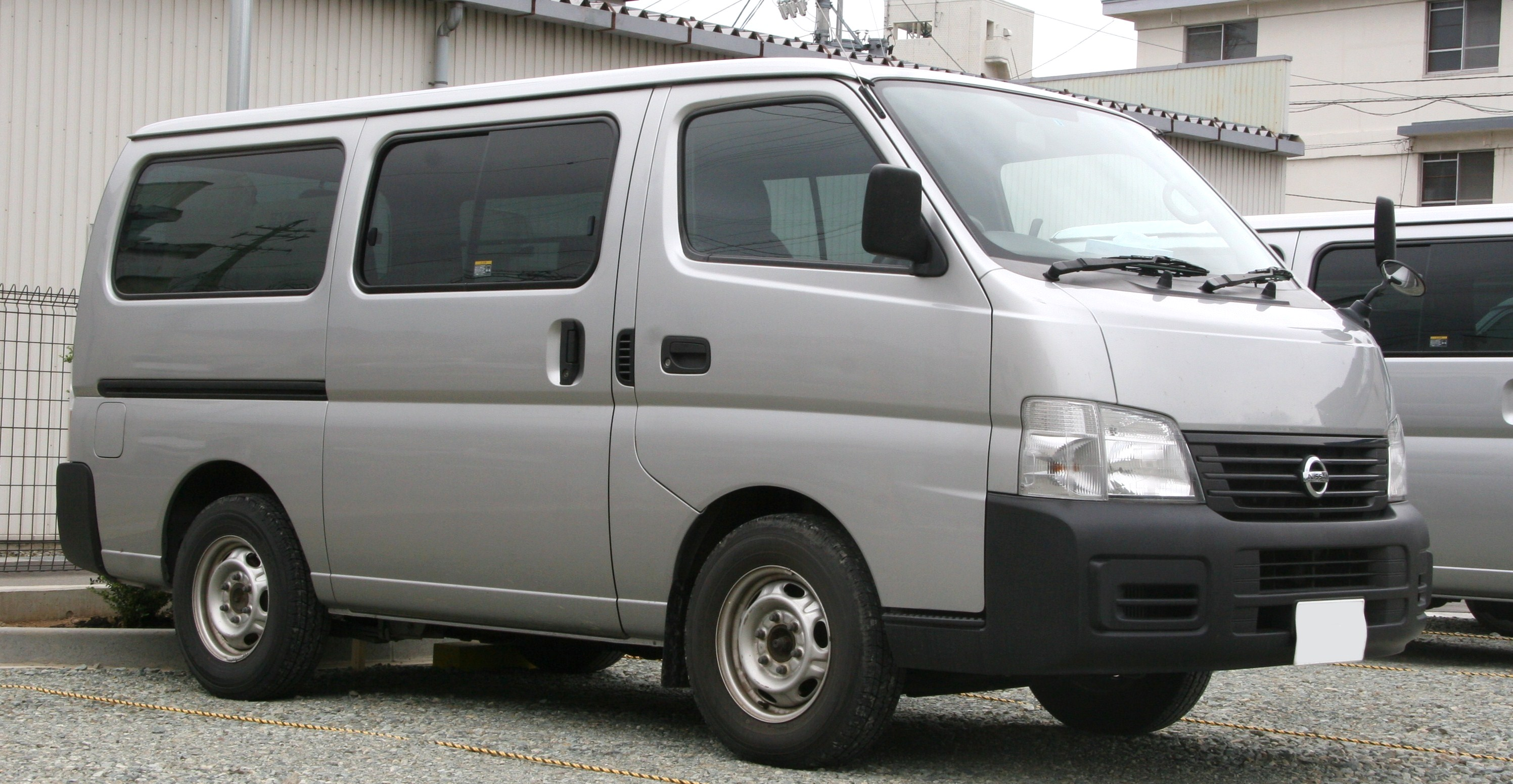
- Nissan Caravan 3.0 Di with dual sliding door (pre-facelift)

Overview
- Also called: Nissan Urvan; Nissan Urvan Estate; Isuzu Como
- Production: April 2001 – May 2012; April 2002 – March 2014 (Philippines)
- Assembly: Japan: Kanagawa (Nissan Shatai); Angola: Luanda (Zhongji Company); Malaysia: Kuala Lumpur (TCMA); Philippines: Santa Rosa City (UMC)

Powertrain
- Engine: Petrol: 2.0 L KA20DE I4; 2.0 L QR20DE I4; 2.4 L KA24DE I4; 2.5 L QR25DE I4; Diesel: 3.0 L ZD30DD I4; 3.0 L ZD30DDTi I/C turbo I4
- Transmission: 5-speed manual 4-speed automatic

Dimensions
- Wheelbase: 2,715 mm (106.9 in)
- Length: Pre-facelift: 4,990 mm (196.5 in); Facelift: 4,995 mm (196.7 in)
- Width: 1,690 mm (66.5 in)
- Height: 1,990 mm (78.3 in); 2,285 mm (90.0 in)
- Curb weight: 1,670 kg (3,682 lb)

Chronology
- Successor: Nissan NV (Mexico); Nissan NV350 Caravan (Japan)

Nissan produced the E25 series from April 2001 to 2012. It was also sold as the Isuzu Como on the Japanese market, replacing the last generation Isuzu Fargo which was a rebadged version of the E24 Caravan.

Mexico was the only North American country to receive the Nissan Caravan vans. 2010 was the last year for this generation in Mexico, as the US-built Nissan NV replaced it.

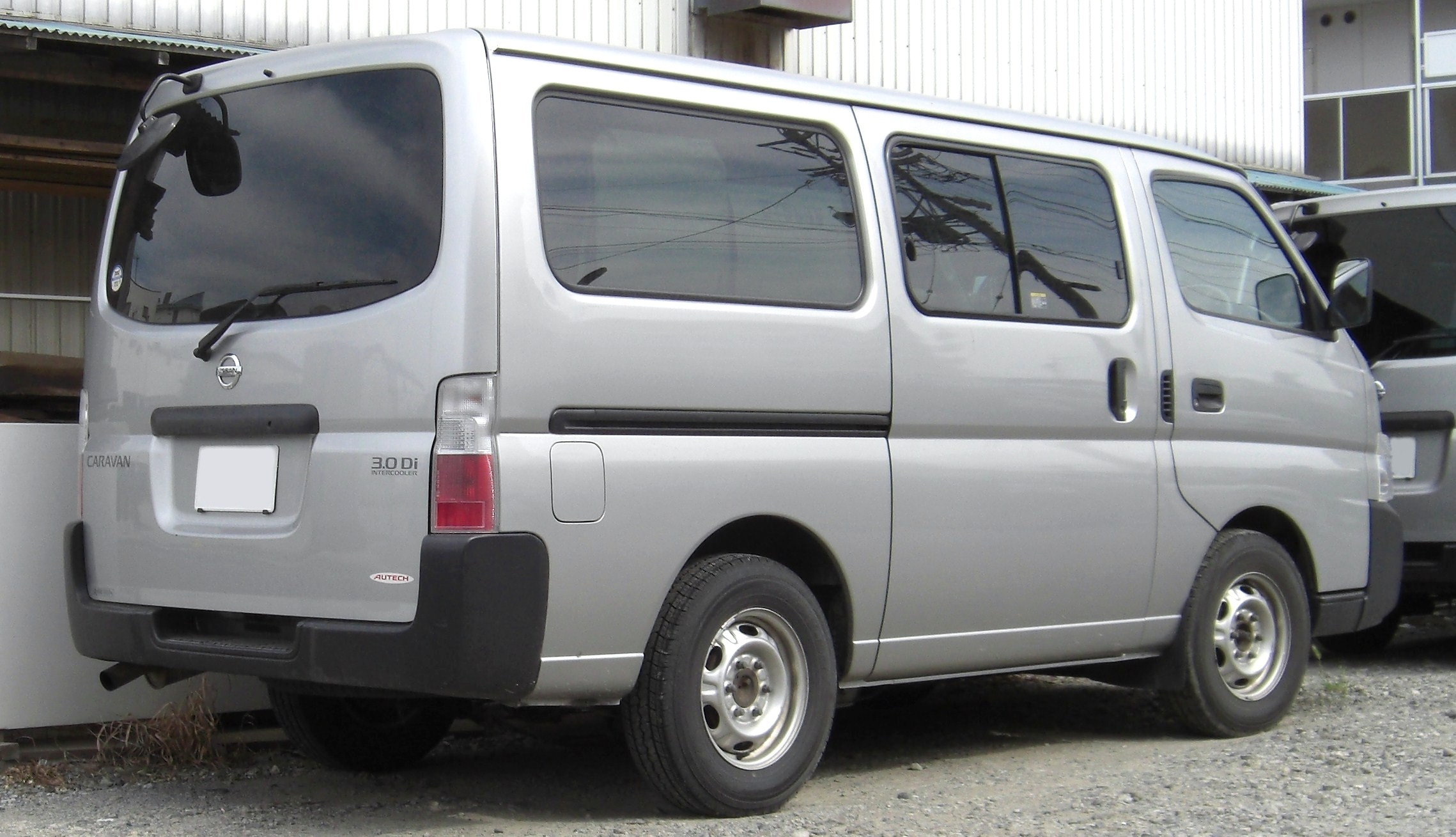
Nissan Caravan 3.0 Di with dual sliding door (pre-facelift)

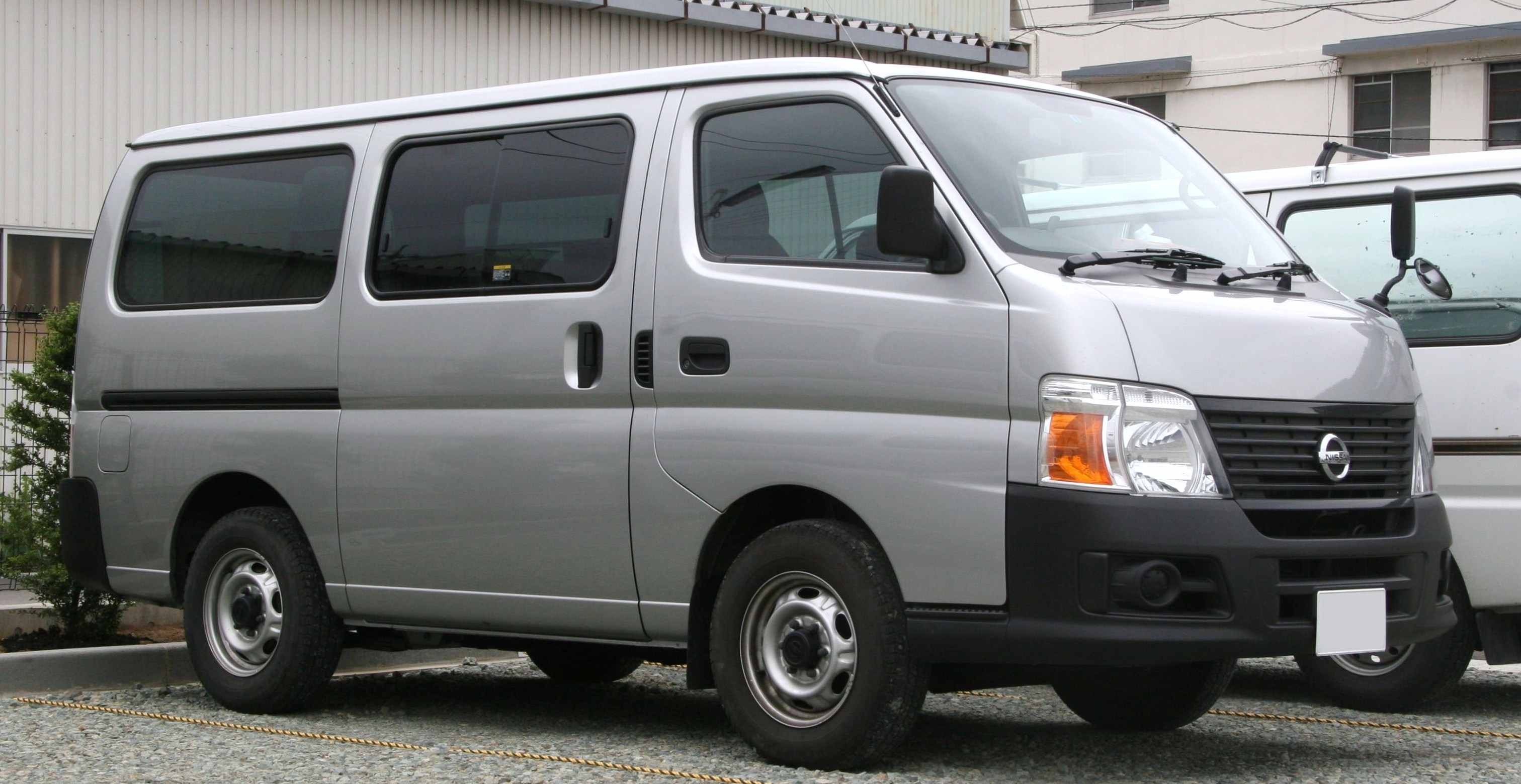
Nissan Caravan 3.0 Di with dual sliding door (facelift)

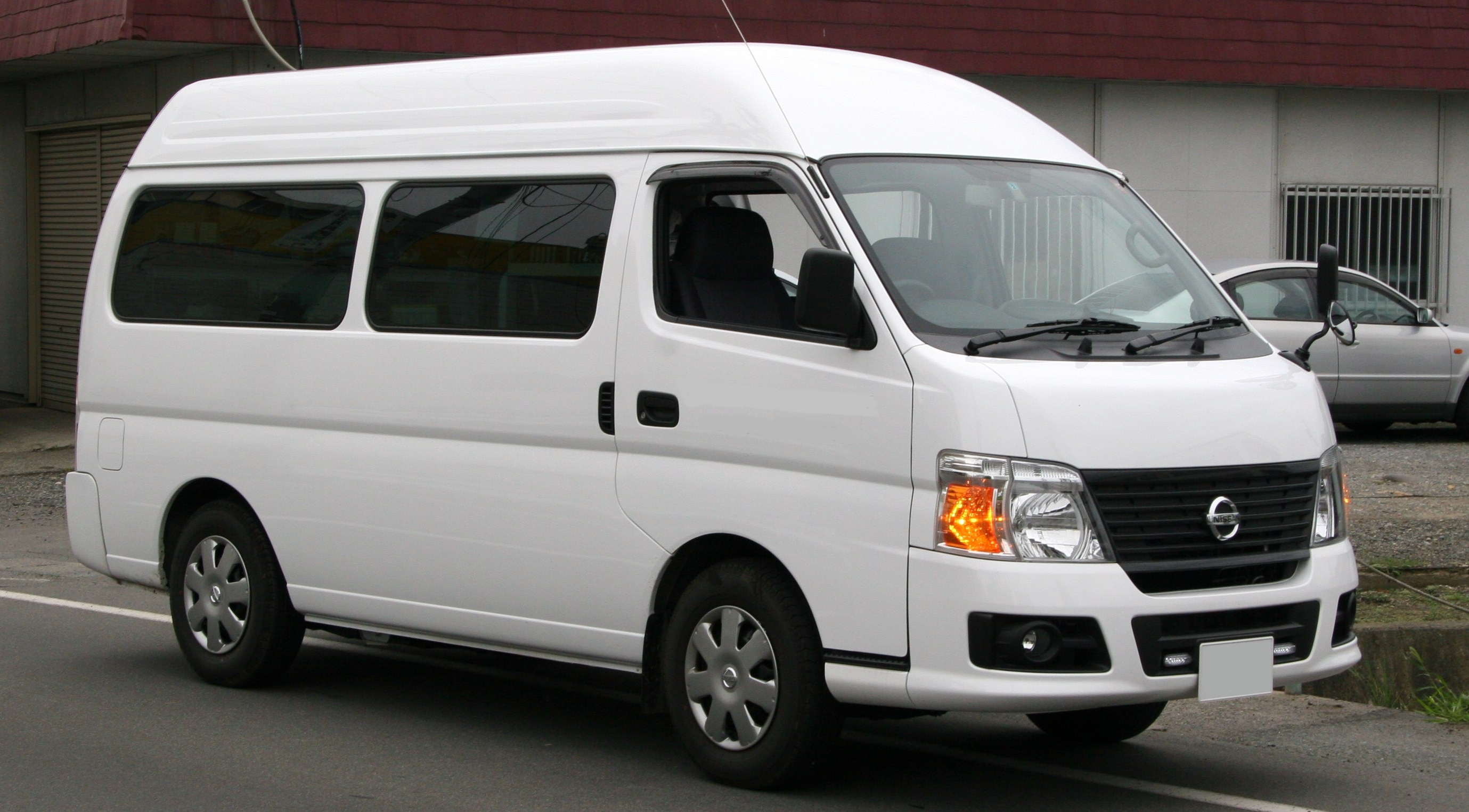
Nissan Caravan High Roof with single sliding door (facelift)

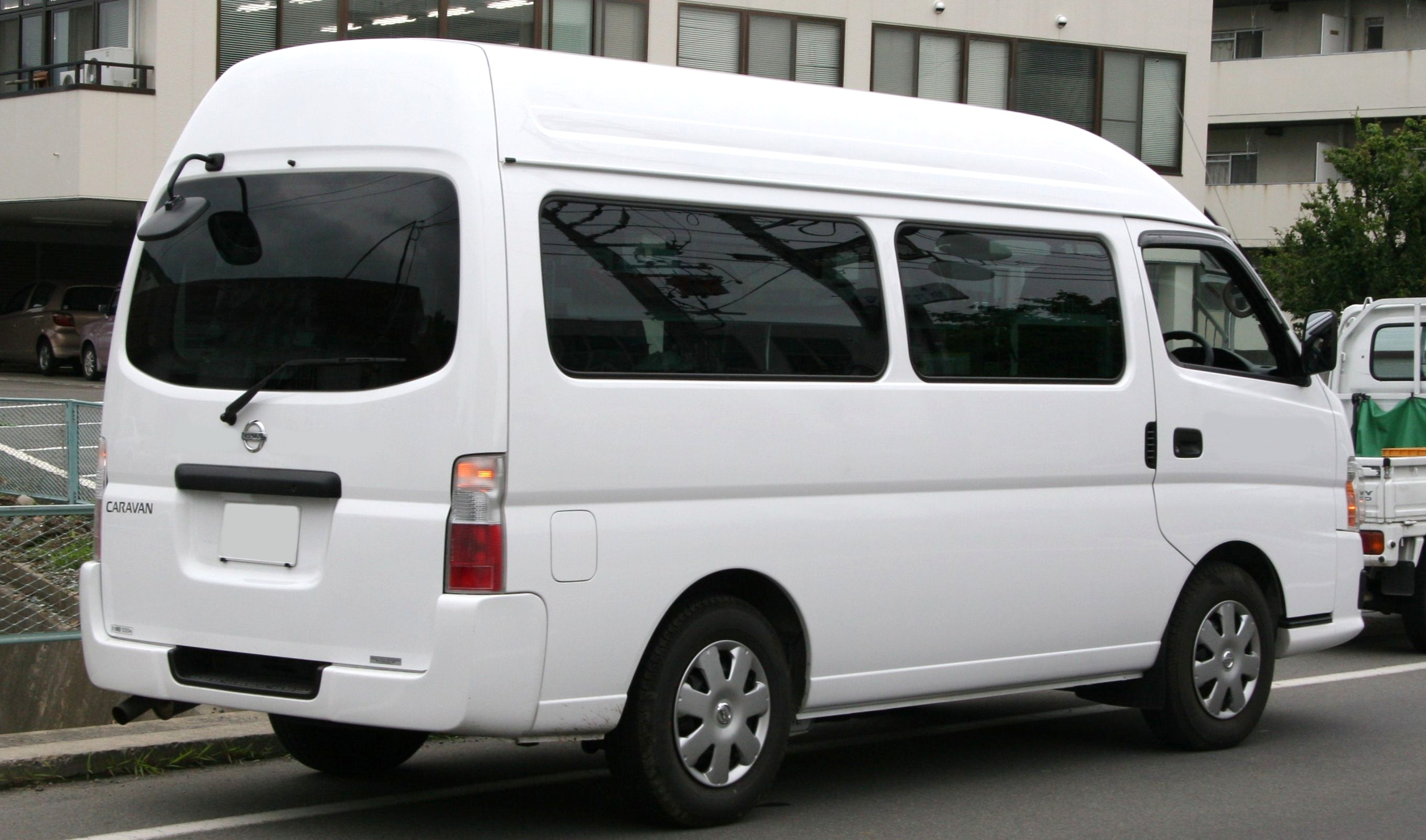
Nissan Caravan High Roof with single sliding door (facelift)

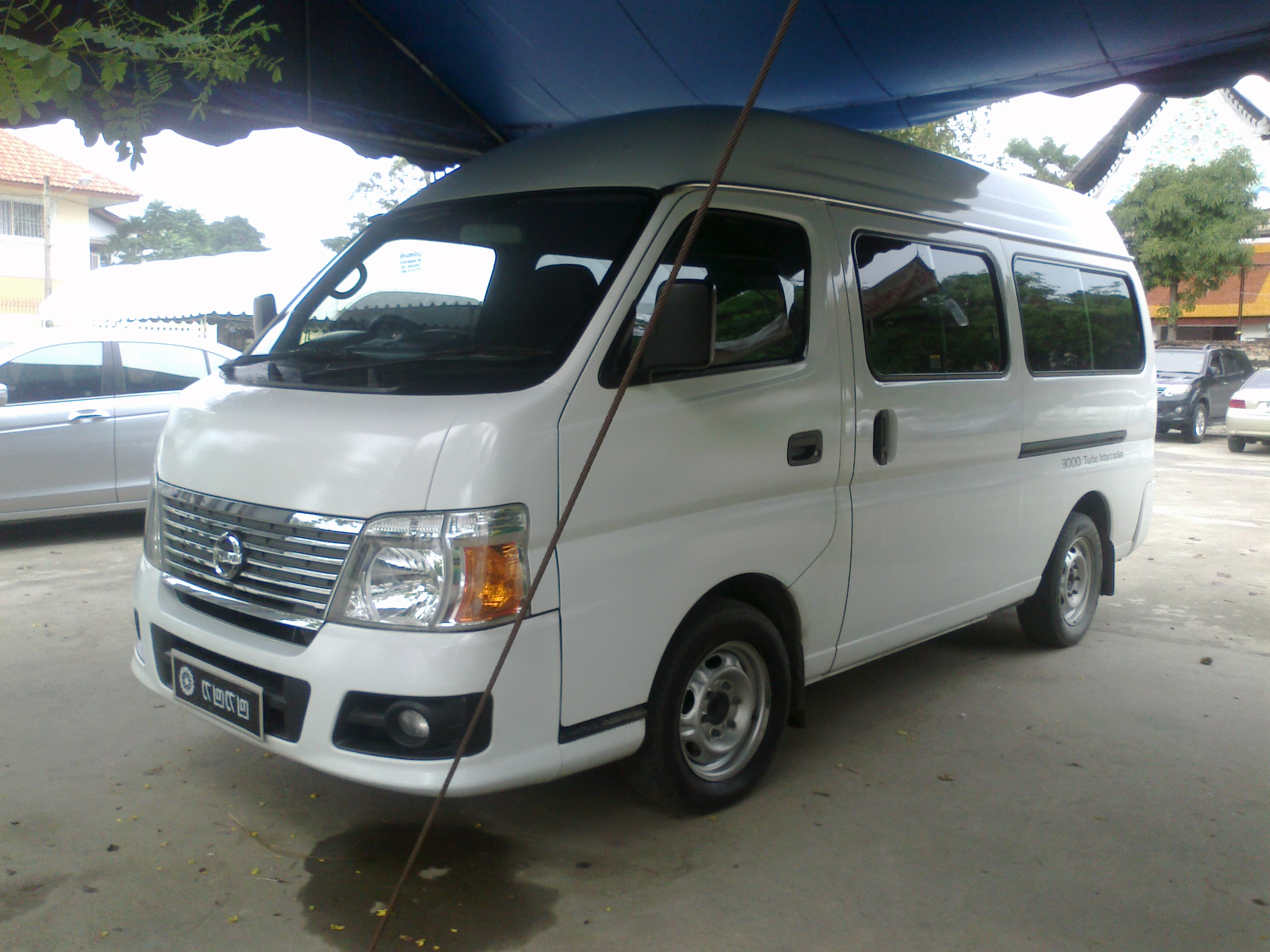
Nissan Urvan Thai version (facelift)

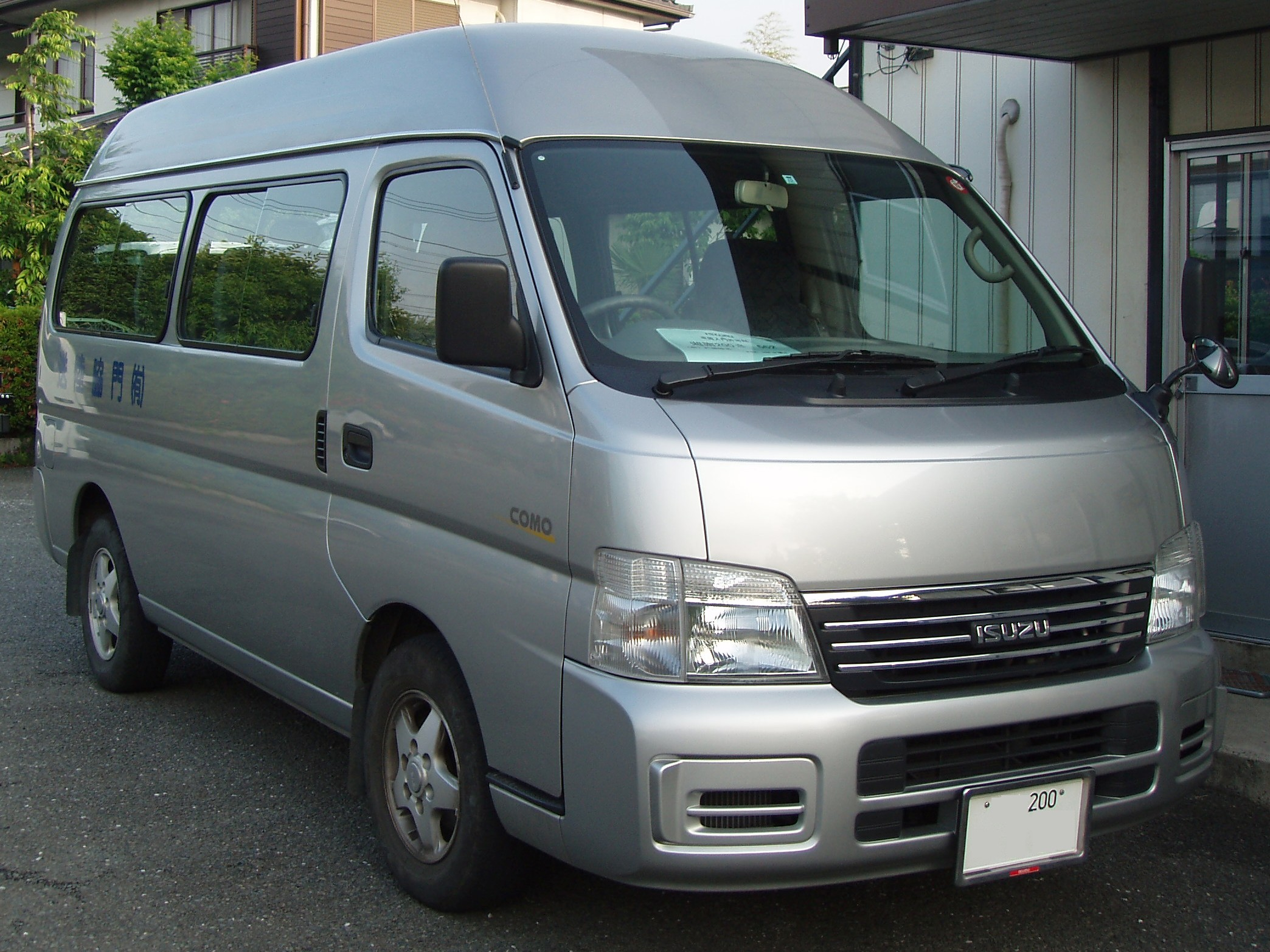
Isuzu Como Minibus LS with single sliding door (pre-facelift)

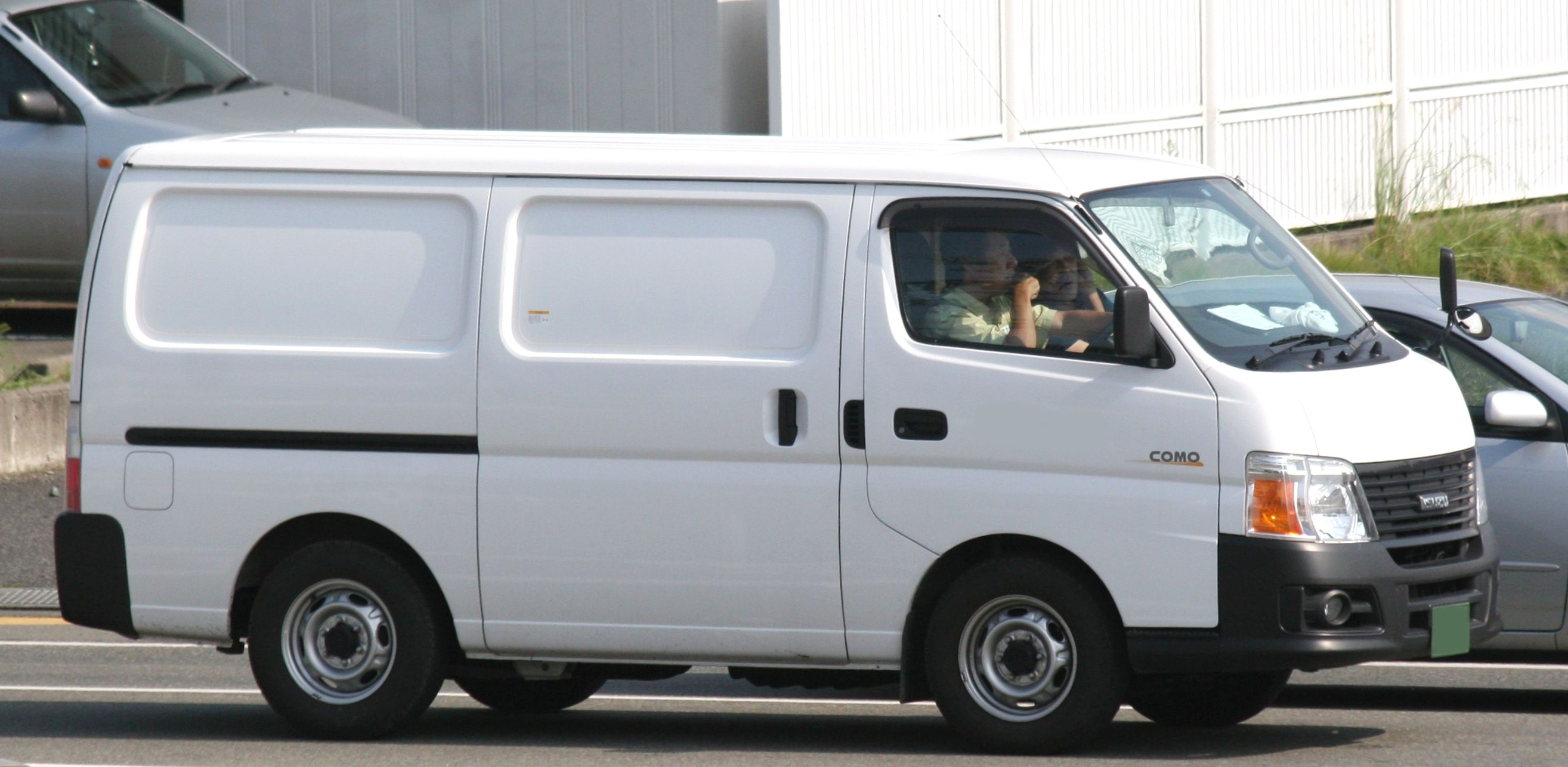
Isuzu Como LD Panel Van with dual sliding door (facelift)

=== Safety ===
The New Zealand Urvan received a one-star rating on the ANCAP crash test.

ANCAP test results Nissan Urvan/ E25 (2009)
Test	Score
Overall	1 /5 stars
Frontal offset	1.32/16
Side impact	16/16
Pole	Not Assessed
Seat belt reminders	0/3
Whiplash protection	Not Assessed
Pedestrian protection	Not Assessed
Electronic stability control	Not Available

== Fifth generation (E26; 2012) ==
Caravan (E26)
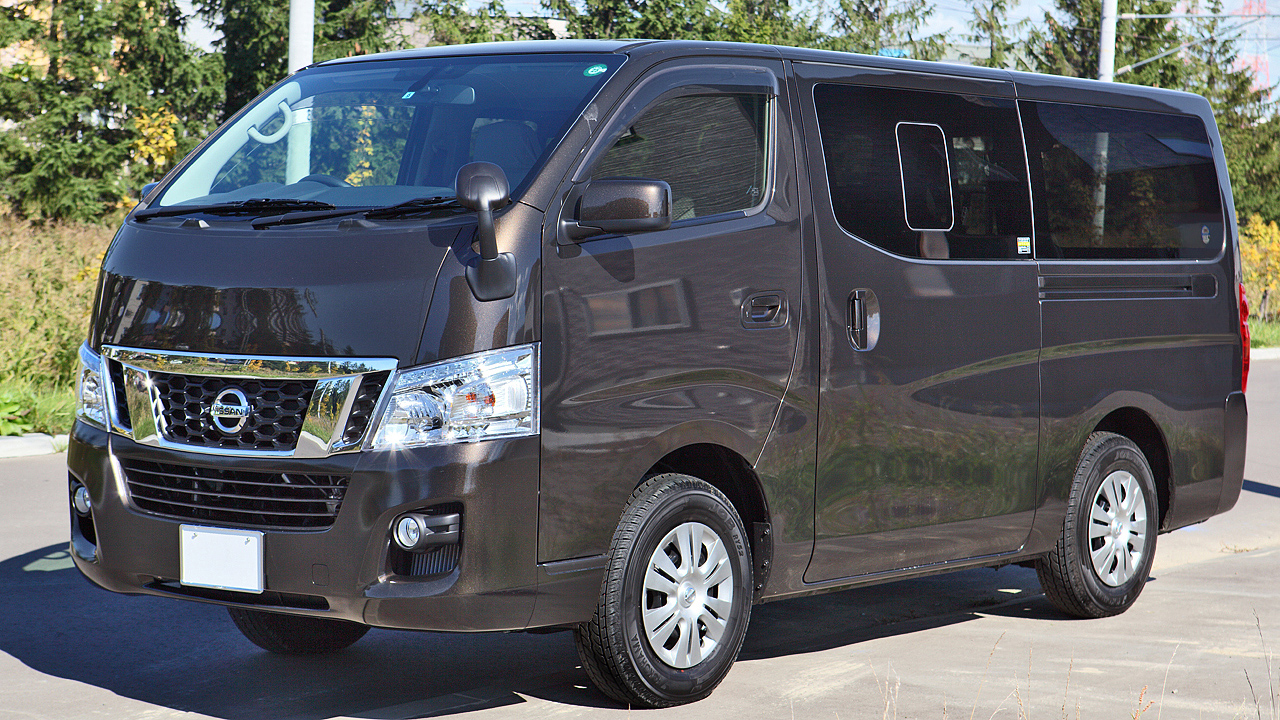
- Nissan NV350 Caravan Premium GX (pre-facelift)

Overview
- Also called: Nissan Paramedic; Nissan NV350 Urvan; Nissan NV350 Caravan (until 2021); Isuzu Como; Mitsubishi Fuso Canter Van; Mitsubishi Versa Van (Philippines)
- Production: June 2012 – present
- Assembly: Japan: Kanda, Fukuoka, Kyushu (Nissan Shatai); Thailand: Samut Prakan (NMT)
- Designer: Koichi Kuraoka (chief designer)

Powertrain
- Engine: Petrol/CNG: 2.0 L QR20DE I4; 2.5 L QR25DE I4; Diesel: 2.4 L Mitsubishi 4N16 turbo I4; 2.5 L YD25DDTi I/C turbo I4
- Transmission: 5-speed manual; 5-speed automatic; 7-speed Jatco JR712E automatic (2022–present; Japan)

Dimensions
- Wheelbase: SWB: 2,555 mm (100.6 in); LWB: 2,940 mm (115.7 in)
- Length: SWB: 4,695 mm (184.8 in); LWB: 5,080 mm (200.0 in)
- Width: 1,695 mm (66.7 in); 1,880 mm (74.0 in) (wide body)
- Height: Low roof: 1,990 mm (78.3 in); High roof: 2,285 mm (90.0 in)
- Curb weight: 1,700–2,340 kg (3,748–5,159 lb)

Chronology
- Predecessor: Nissan Paramedic (E50); Nissan NV (North America)

At the 2011 Tokyo Motor Show, a replacement of the Nissan Caravan, called the NV350 Caravan, was premiered. It went on sale on 15 June 2012 with diesel engine and super long body variants went on sale on 13 July 2012, and the wide version model arrived in winter 2012. The new NV350 Caravan comes with the all new YD25DDTi engine with clean diesel technology. Most petrol engines take advantage of its fuel saving technology for class leading fuel economy, for example the QR20DE. Those engines achieved either a 10 or 5 percent improvement in fuel economy over Japan's 2015 fuel economy standard. The NV350 Caravan continues to be sold as the Isuzu Como on the Japanese market as well. The NV350 Caravan received its first facelift on 13 July 2017 and its second facelift on 20 October 2021, when it was renamed back to Nissan Caravan. In Japan, the Autech Rider model was available.

In the Philippines, the NV350 Caravan (E26) was introduced on 11 June 2015 and is known as the NV350 Urvan. The NV350 Urvan is imported from Japan rather than being assembled locally. It is offered in five models: the base-grade 3-seater Cargo, the base-line 15-seater and 18-seater Standard, the mid-range 12-seater, and the high-end 10-seater Super Elite. In May 2017, the base-top-of-the-line Premium was launched. It is a 15-seater model, available with 5-speed manual and 5-speed automatic transmissions, being the first ever Urvan in the Philippines that comes with a standard automatic transmission. In March 2018, the high-top-of-the-line 8-seater Premium S was launched, it is also offered with either a 5-speed manual or an automatic transmission.

On 11 September 2013, Mitsubishi Fuso and Nissan reached a basic agreement regarding original equipment manufacturer supply of finished commercial vans for export, whereby Nissan would supply NV350 Urvans to be sold as the Fuso Canter Van in the Middle East from 2014. Two versions are offered, the van and microbus.

The E26 is sold in Mexico as the NV350 Urvan. In South Africa, the taxi variant is sold as the Nissan NV350 Impendulo.

=== 2022 facelift ===
The second facelift Caravan was launched for the Japanese market on 20 October 2021. It features the new flat-bottom steering wheel.

Subsequent to the OEM deal with Mitsubishi, Nissan also added Mitsubishi's 4N16 diesel engine at the time of the facelift. This was coupled to a new, 7-speed automatic transmission.

In the Philippines, the facelifted Caravan was introduced on 24 October 2022 as the Urvan. It is offered in five grades: the entry-level 3-seater Cargo (Hi-roof), the mid-grade 15-seater and 18-seater Standard (Normal roof), the high-end 3-seater GX (Hi-roof), and the top-spec 15-seater Premium (Hi-roof). 12-seater, Super Elite and Premium S grades were removed from the lineup. For the Philippine market, the Urvan retains the YD25DDTi diesel engine mated to a 5-speed manual transmission for all models and 5-speed automatic transmission which is only available for the GX and Premium grades. A rebadged Mitsubishi version is also available as the Mitsubishi Versa Van, which will go on sale in February 2026.

=== Mitsubishi Versa ===
On 22 November 2024, Mitsubishi Motors Philippines announced that they will be planning a new model for the Philippines market, which will be a rebadged variant of the E26 Nissan Urvan. On 14 May 2025, Nissan confirmed that they will be partnering with Mitsubishi for a van for the Philippine market.

On 17 October 2025, Mitsubishi Motors Philippines confirmed that the Mitsubishi-based E26 Nissan Urvan will be named the Mitsubishi Versa; the name was last used decades ago on the Mitsubishi L300 passenger van. It was also announced that there will be multiple variants of the Mitsubishi Versa once it is launched. MMPC announced that the new Versa van will be powered by a 2488cc turbo-diesel engine. The van is expected to put out 129 PS and 356 Nm of torque since the Nissan Urvan E26 also uses the 2.5L YD25DDti turbo-diesel. Based on the variant listed by the LTO, the Versa Van will be offered in the GLX 2.5D 2WD MT model that's available as a 15-seater van.

On 6 February 2026, the Versa was released in the Philippines.

Size-wise, the Versa Van GLX MT will measure 4710mm long, 1695mm wide, 1999mm tall, and will have a 2555mm wheelbase. It will also have a ground clearance of 195mm and will roll on 15-inch wheels wrapped in 195/80 series tires.

=== Gallery ===
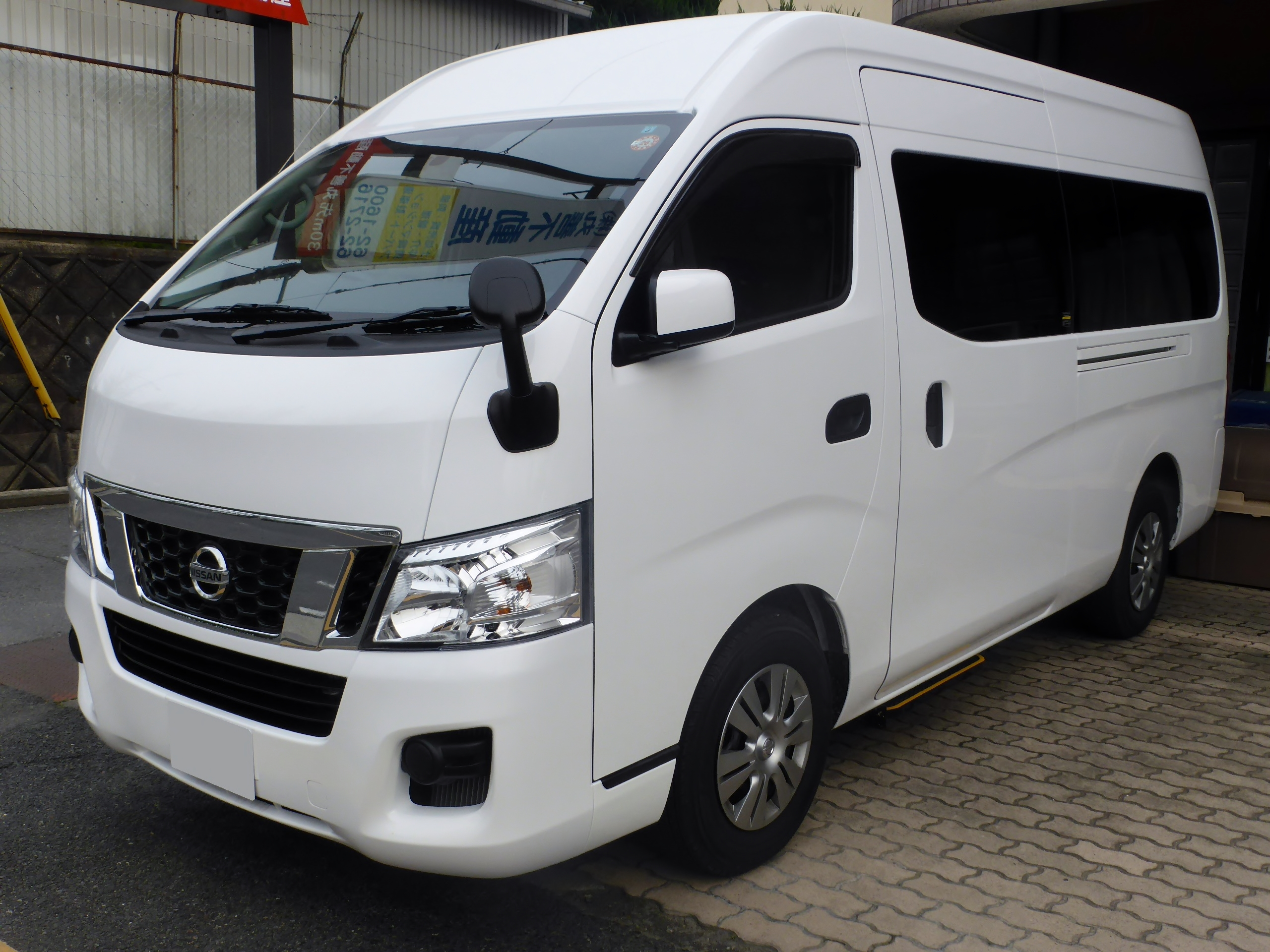
Nissan NV350 Caravan Microbus GX (pre-facelift)

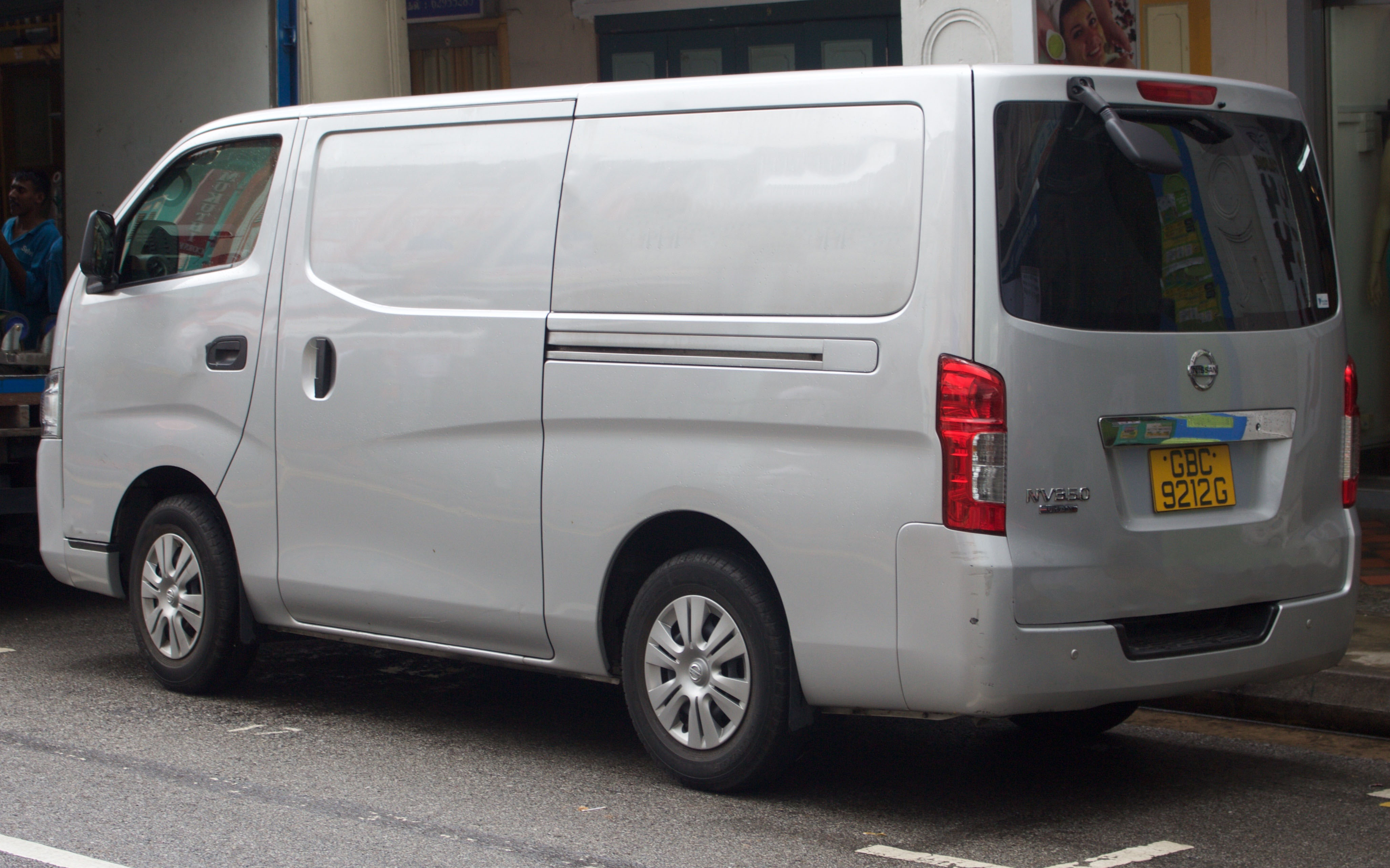
Nissan NV350 Urvan (pre-facelift)

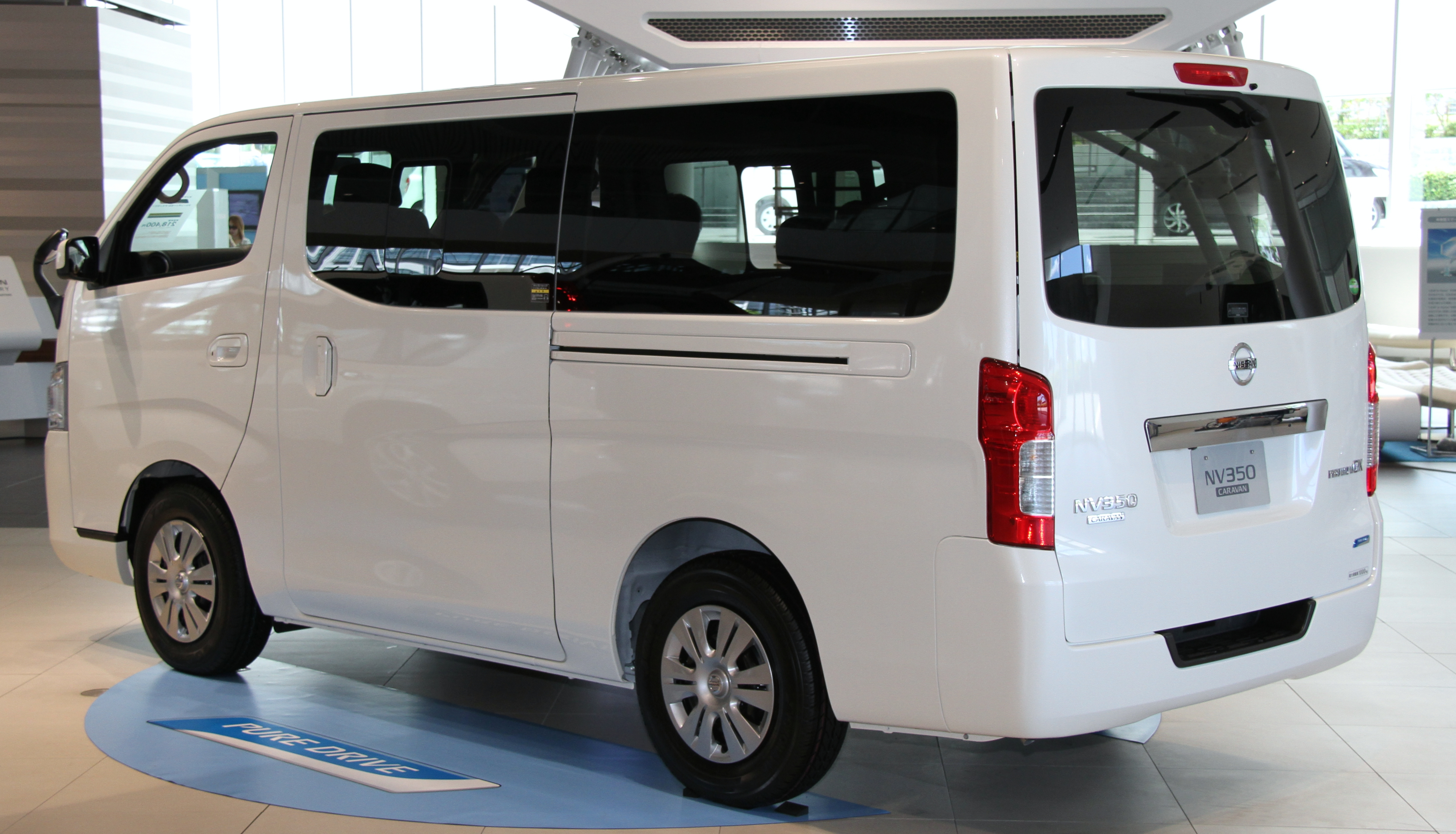
Nissan NV350 Caravan Premium GX (pre-facelift)

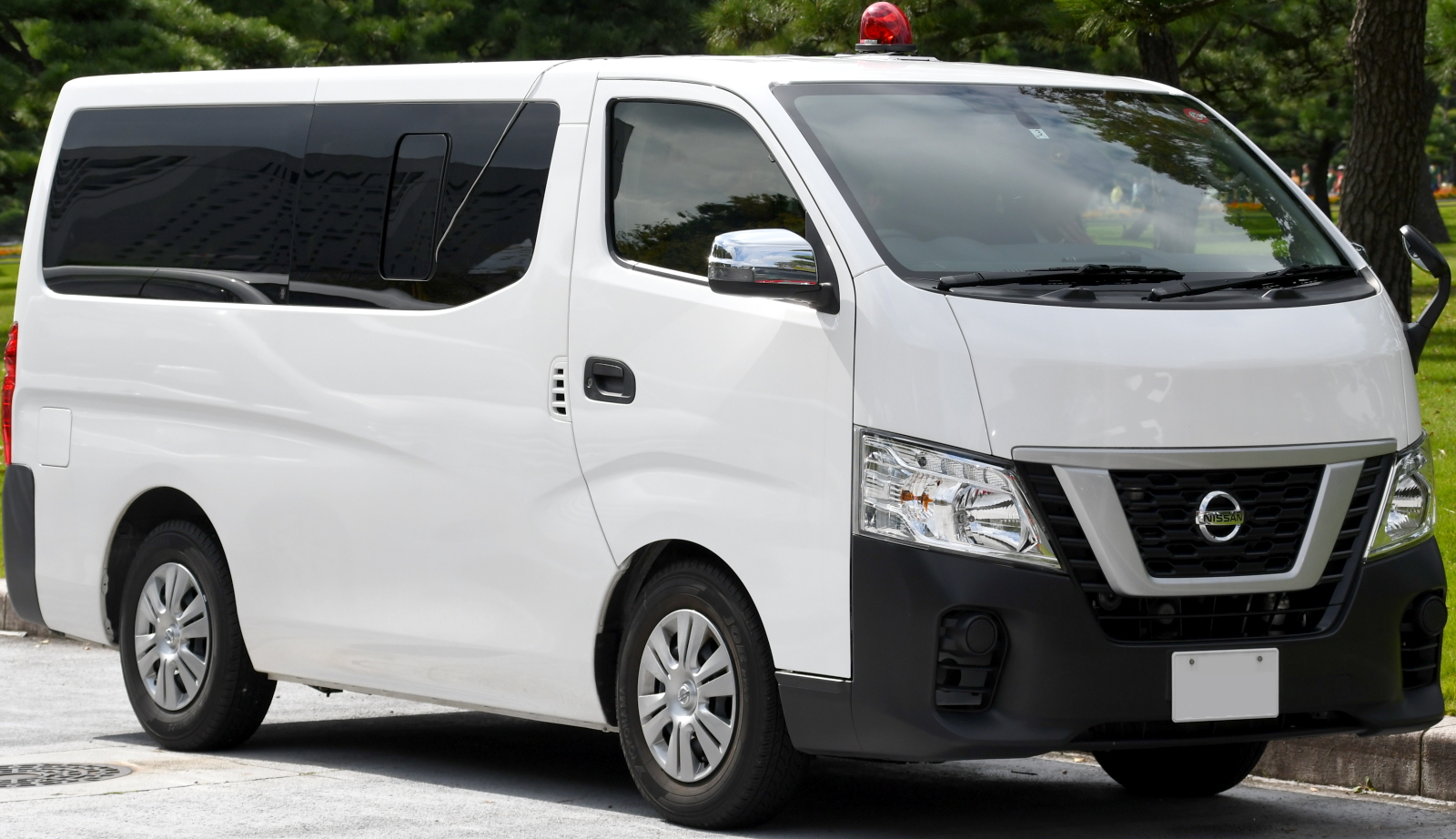
Nissan NV350 Caravan DX with single sliding door (first facelift)

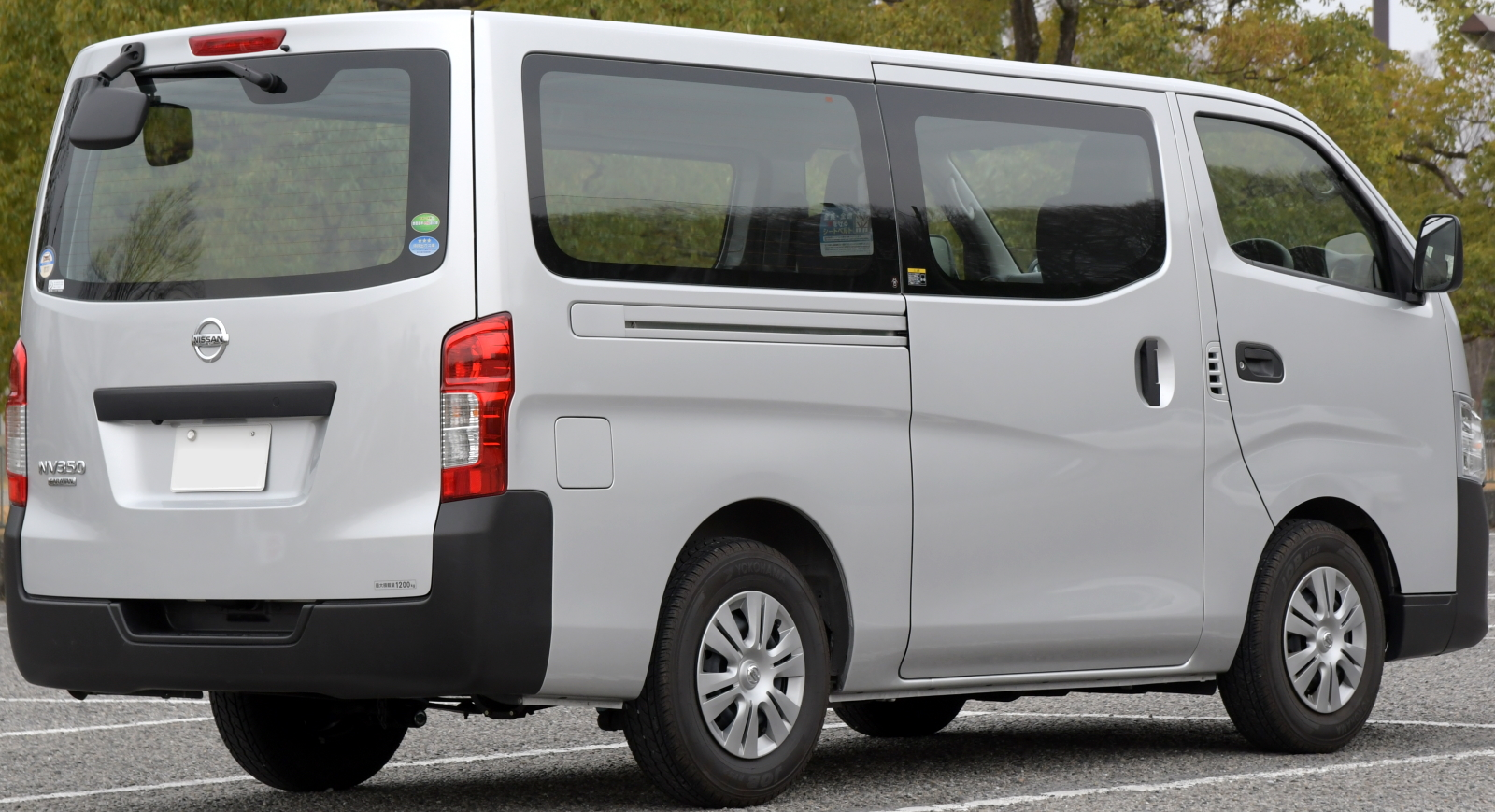
Nissan NV350 Caravan DX with dual sliding door (first facelift)

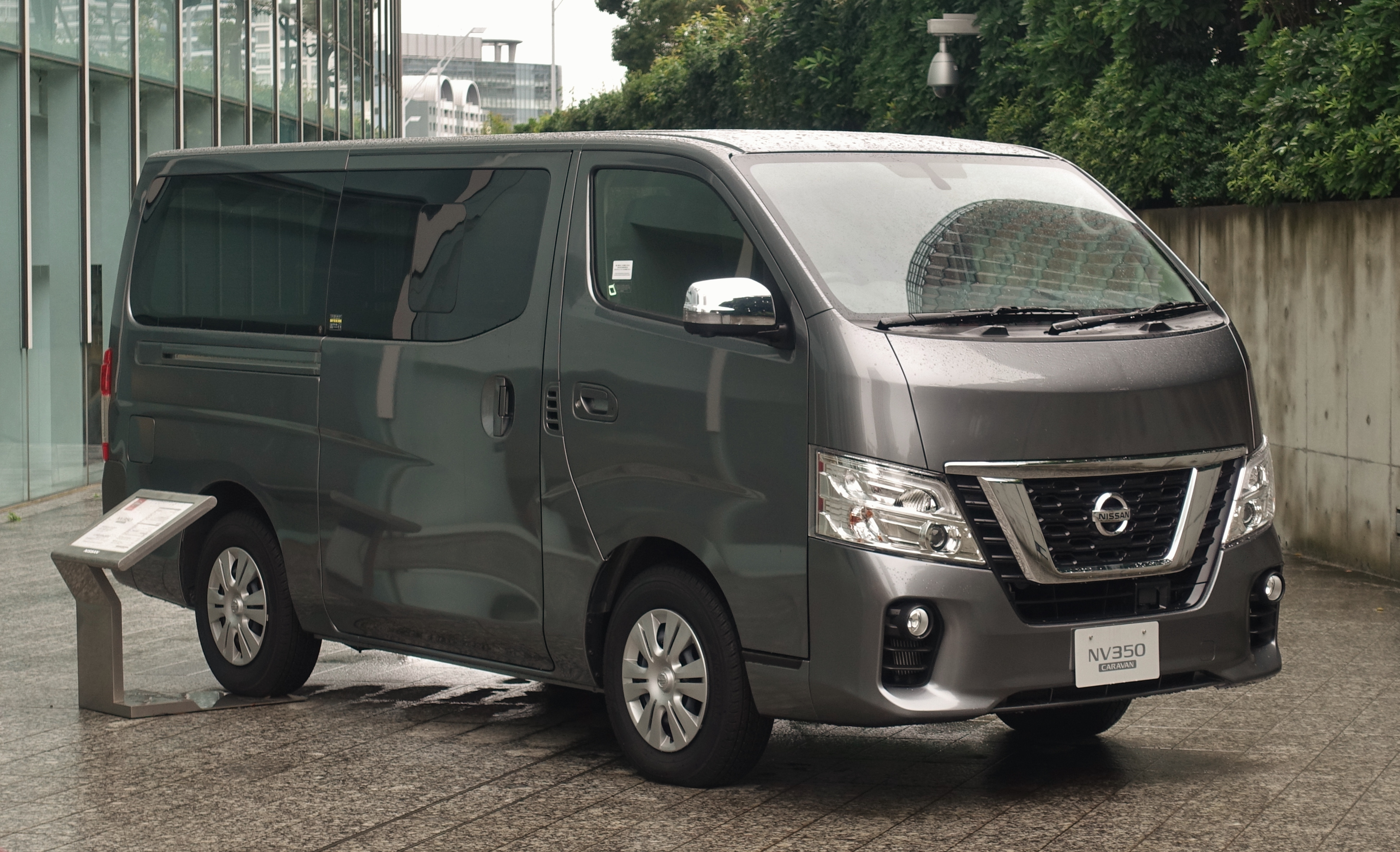
Nissan NV350 Caravan Premium GX (first facelift)

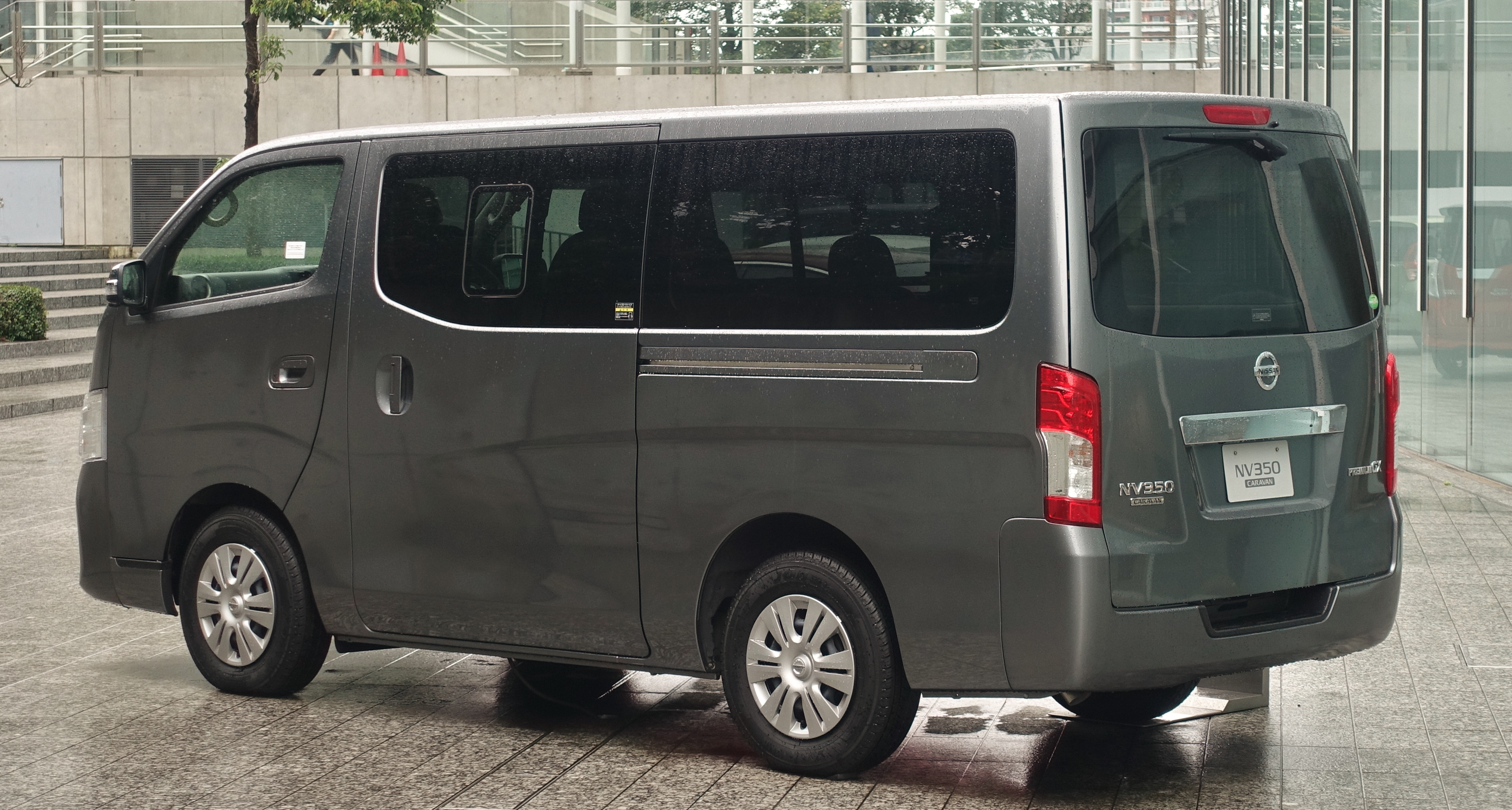
Nissan NV350 Caravan Premium GX (first facelift)

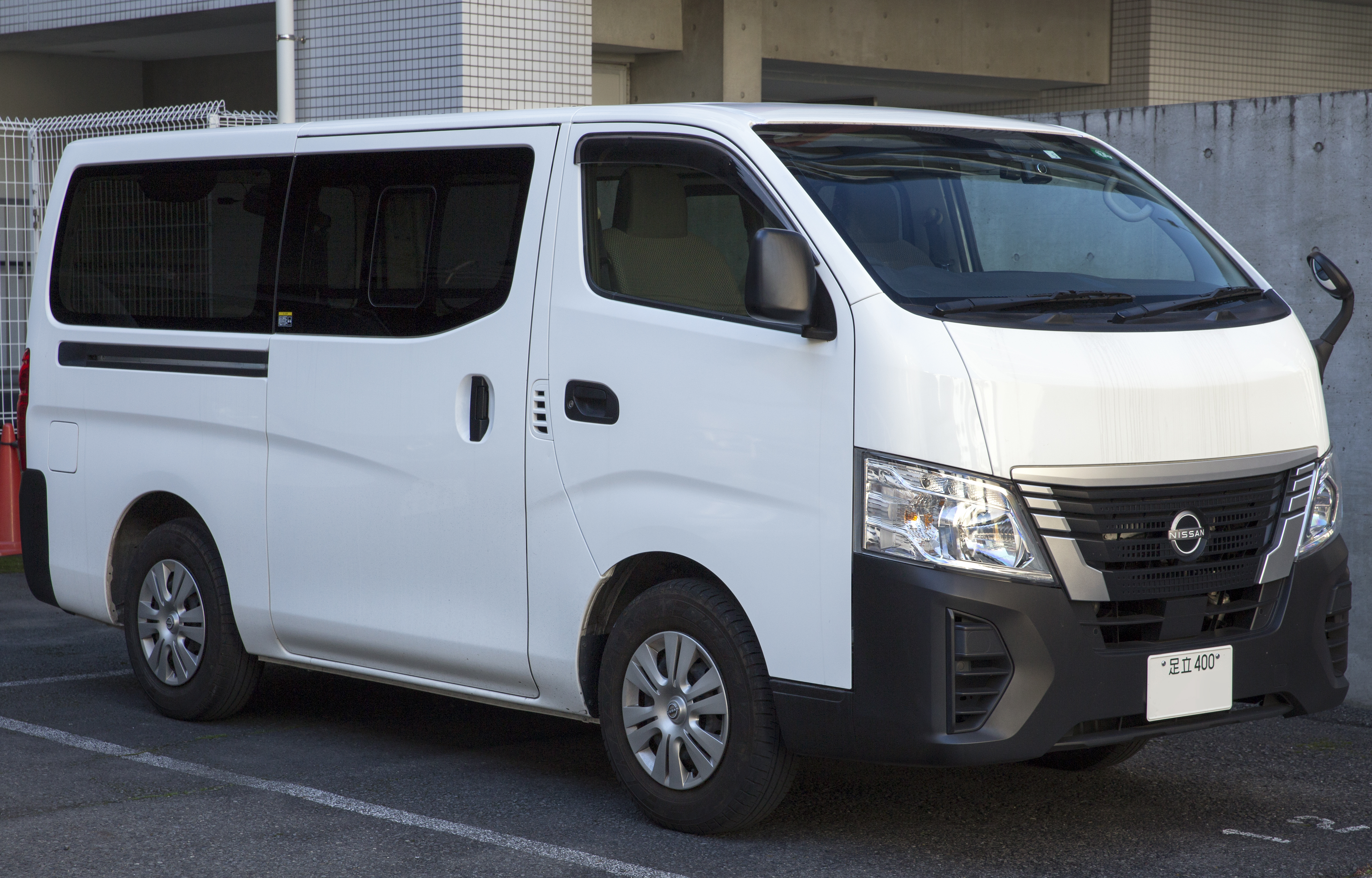
Nissan Caravan DX (second facelift)

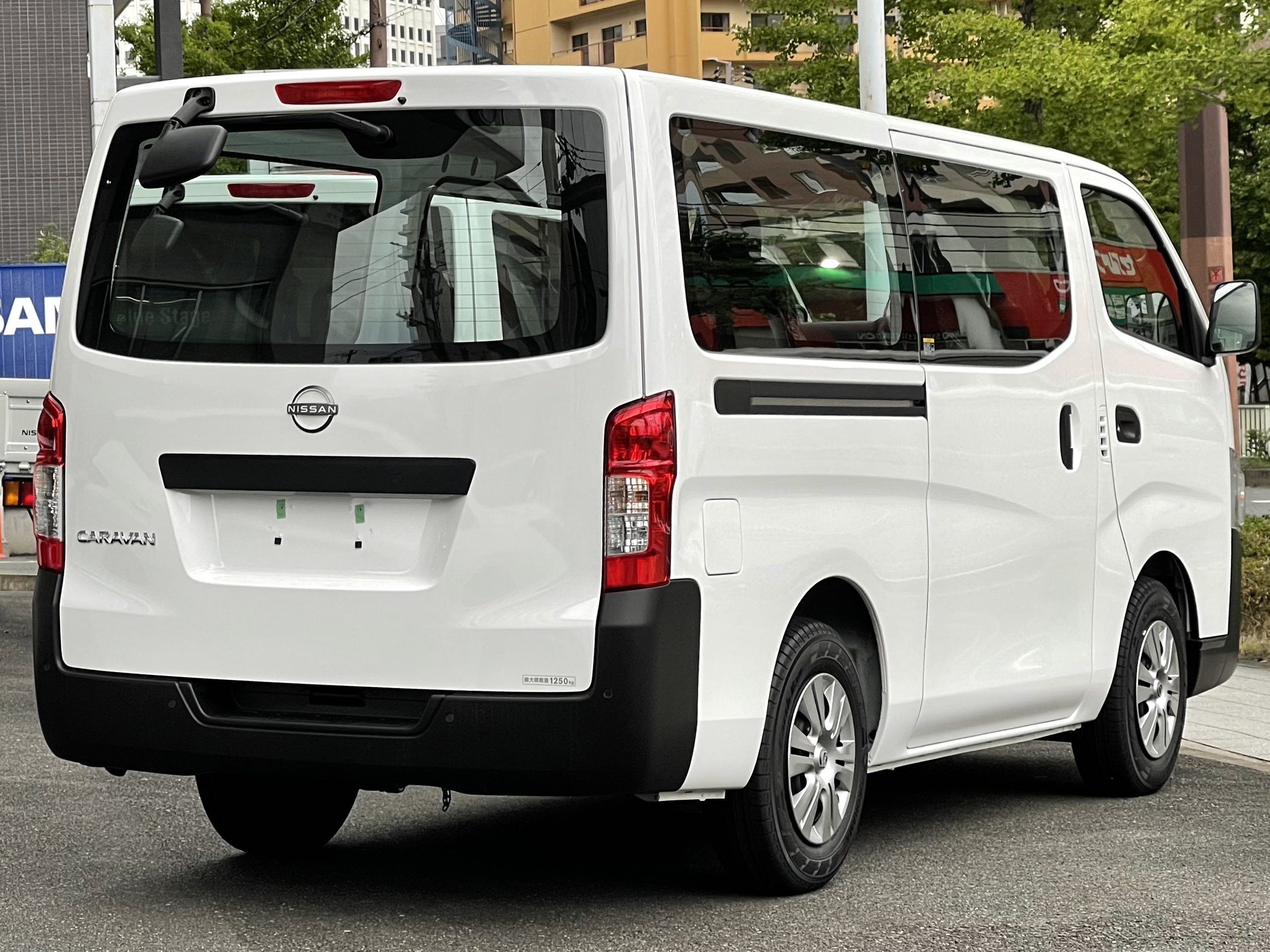
Nissan Caravan DX (second facelift)

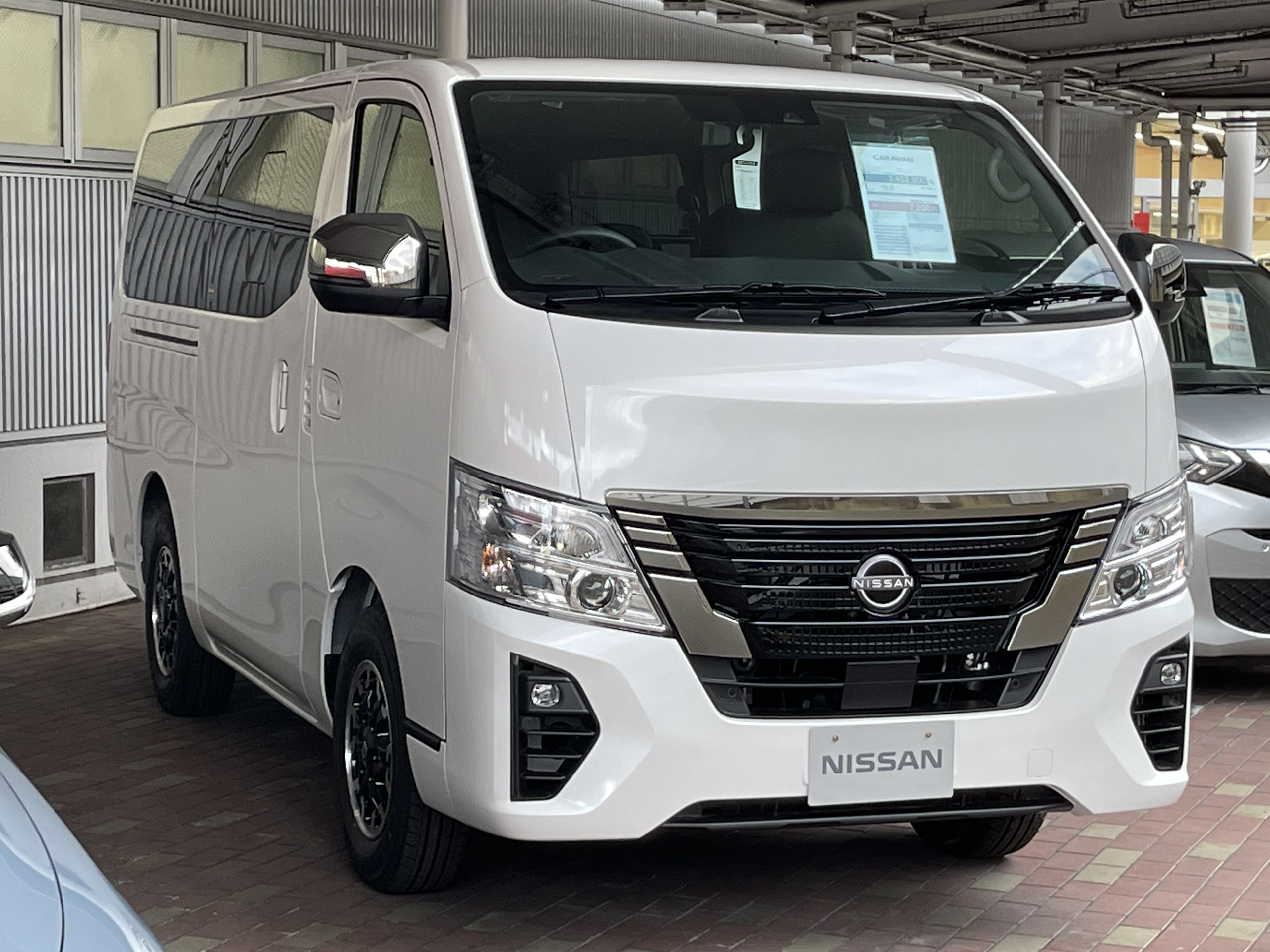
Nissan Caravan Grand Premium GX (second facelift)

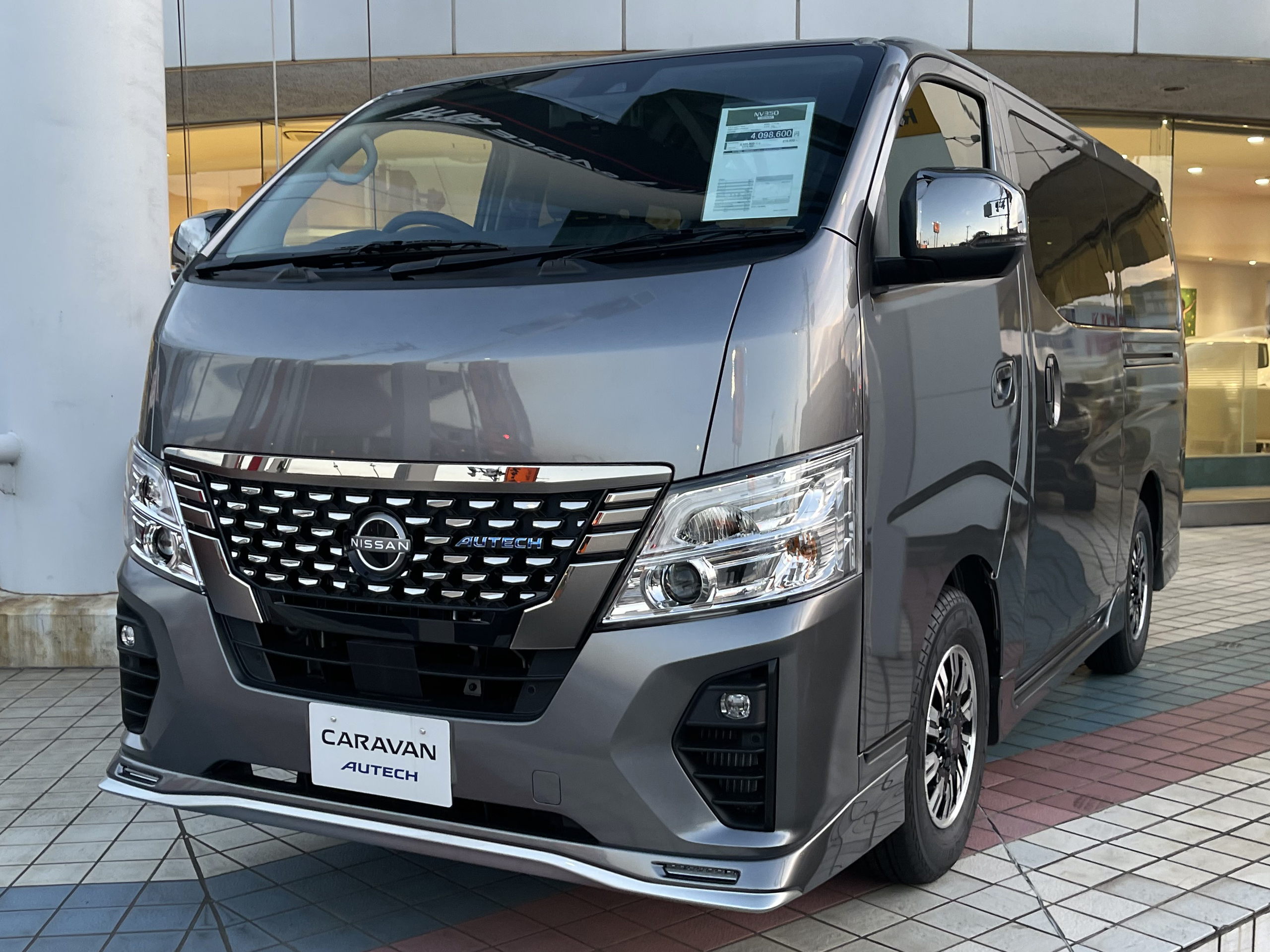
Nissan Caravan Autech (second facelift)

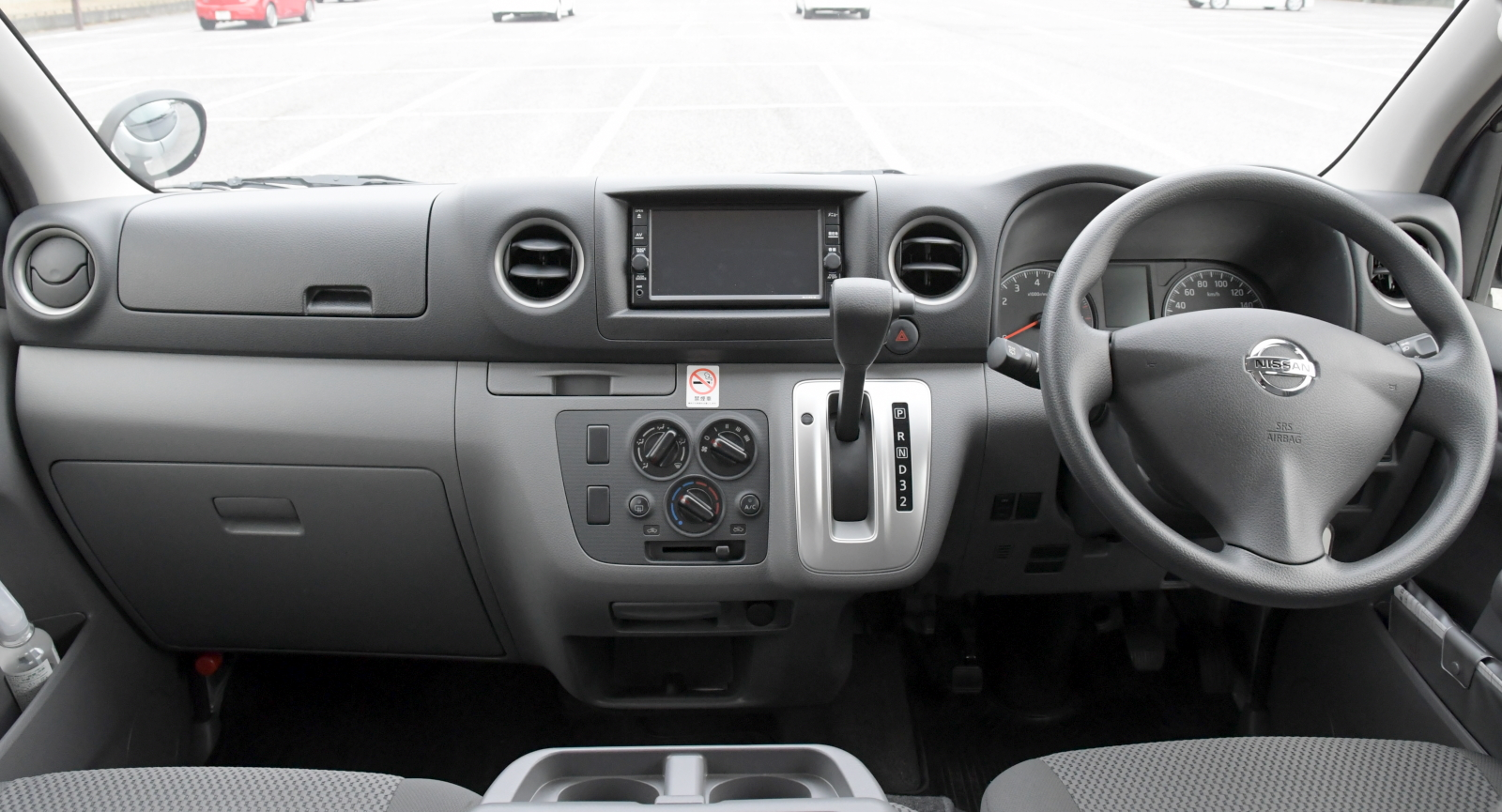
Interior (DX; first facelift)

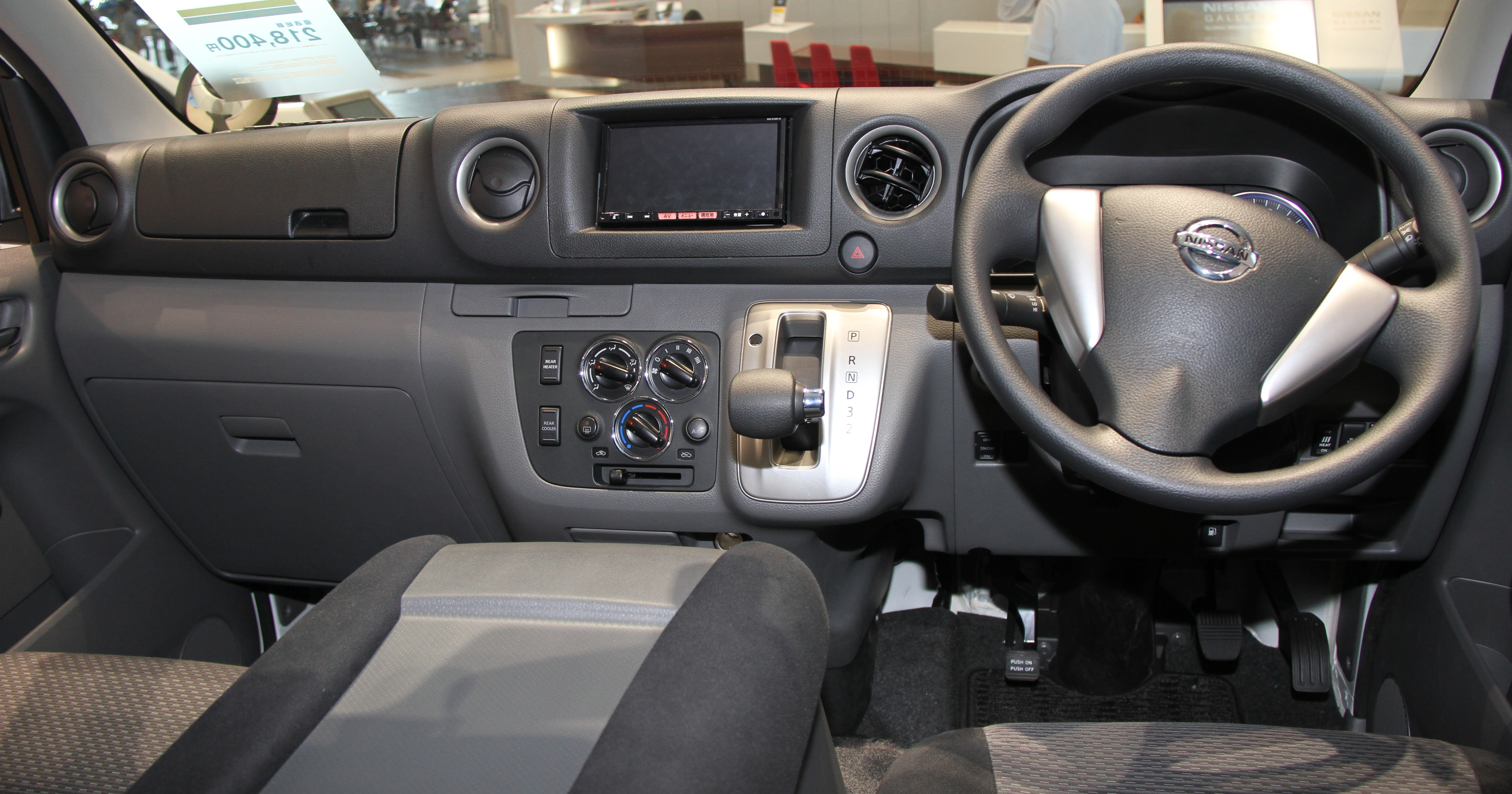
Interior (Premium GX; pre-facelift)

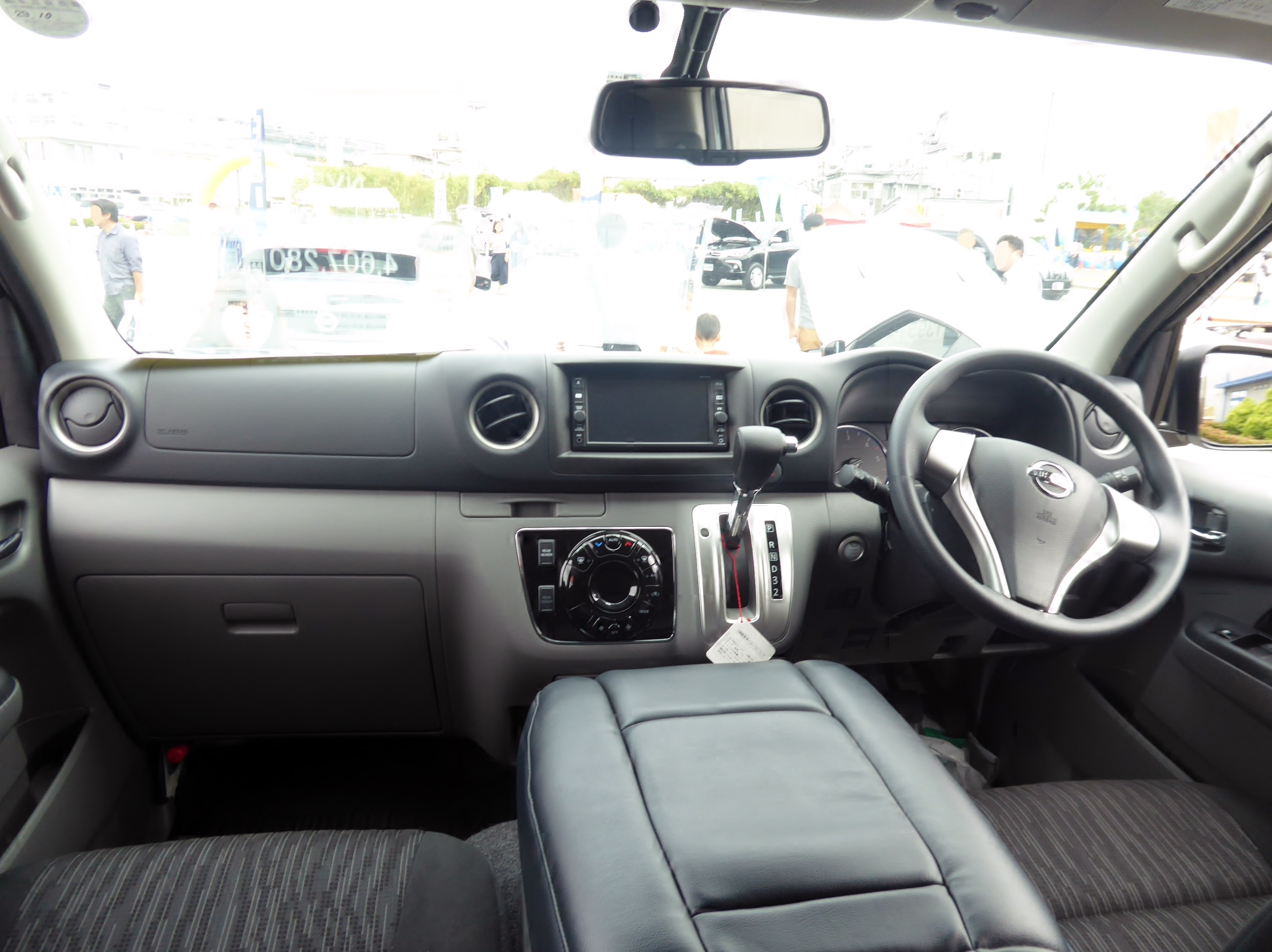
Interior (Transporter; first facelift)

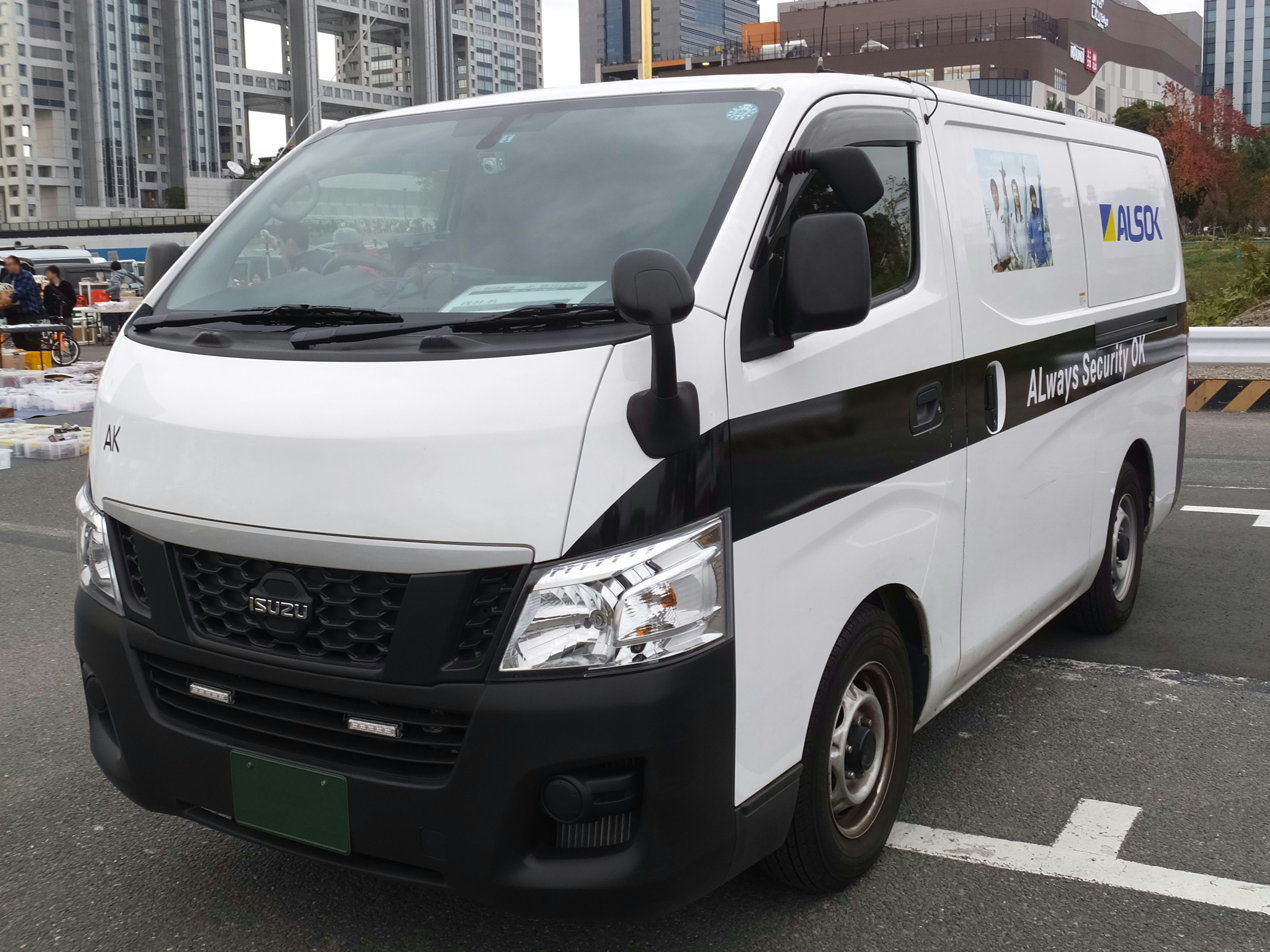
2014 Isuzu Como

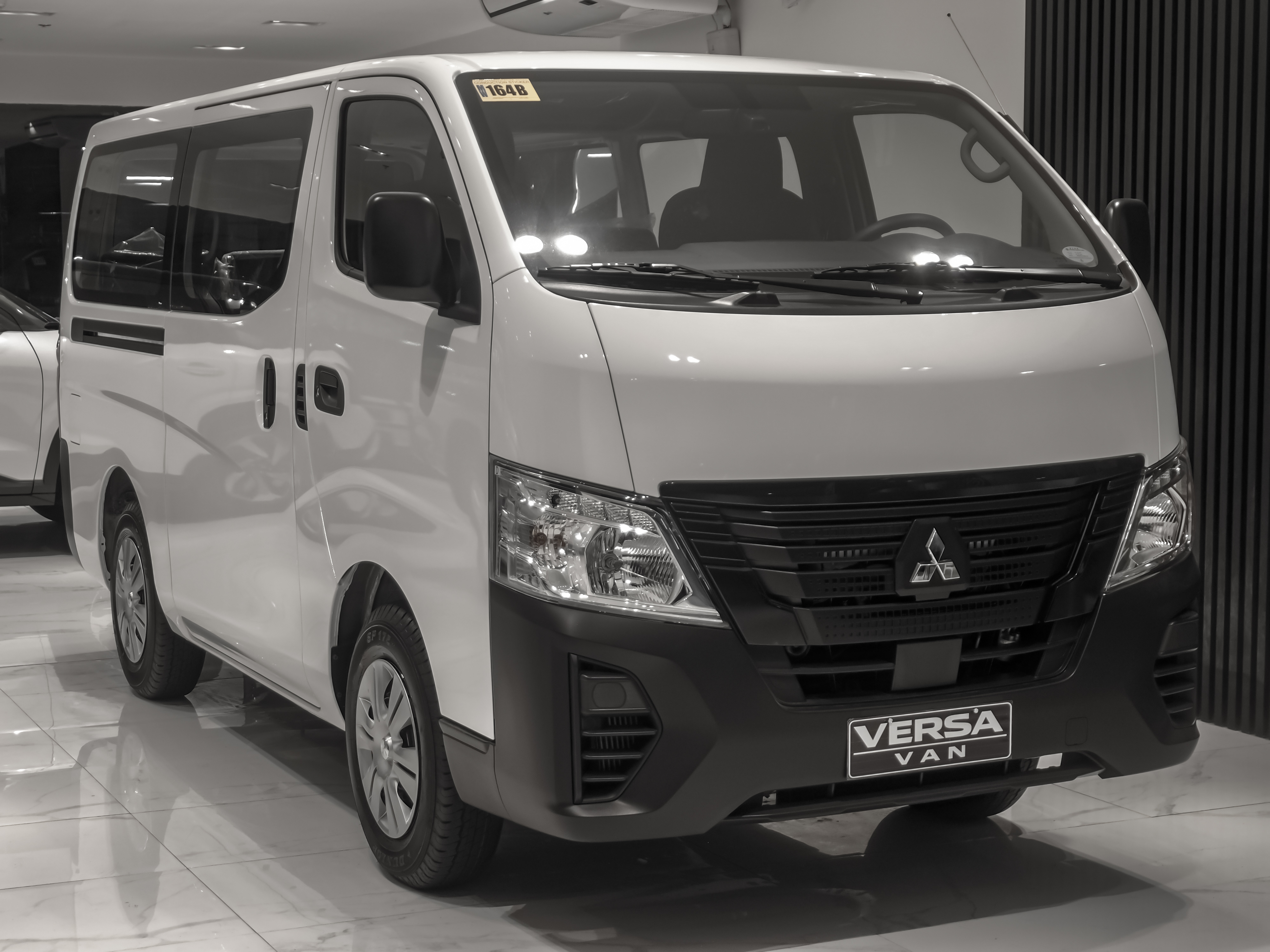
Mitsubishi Versa Van GLX

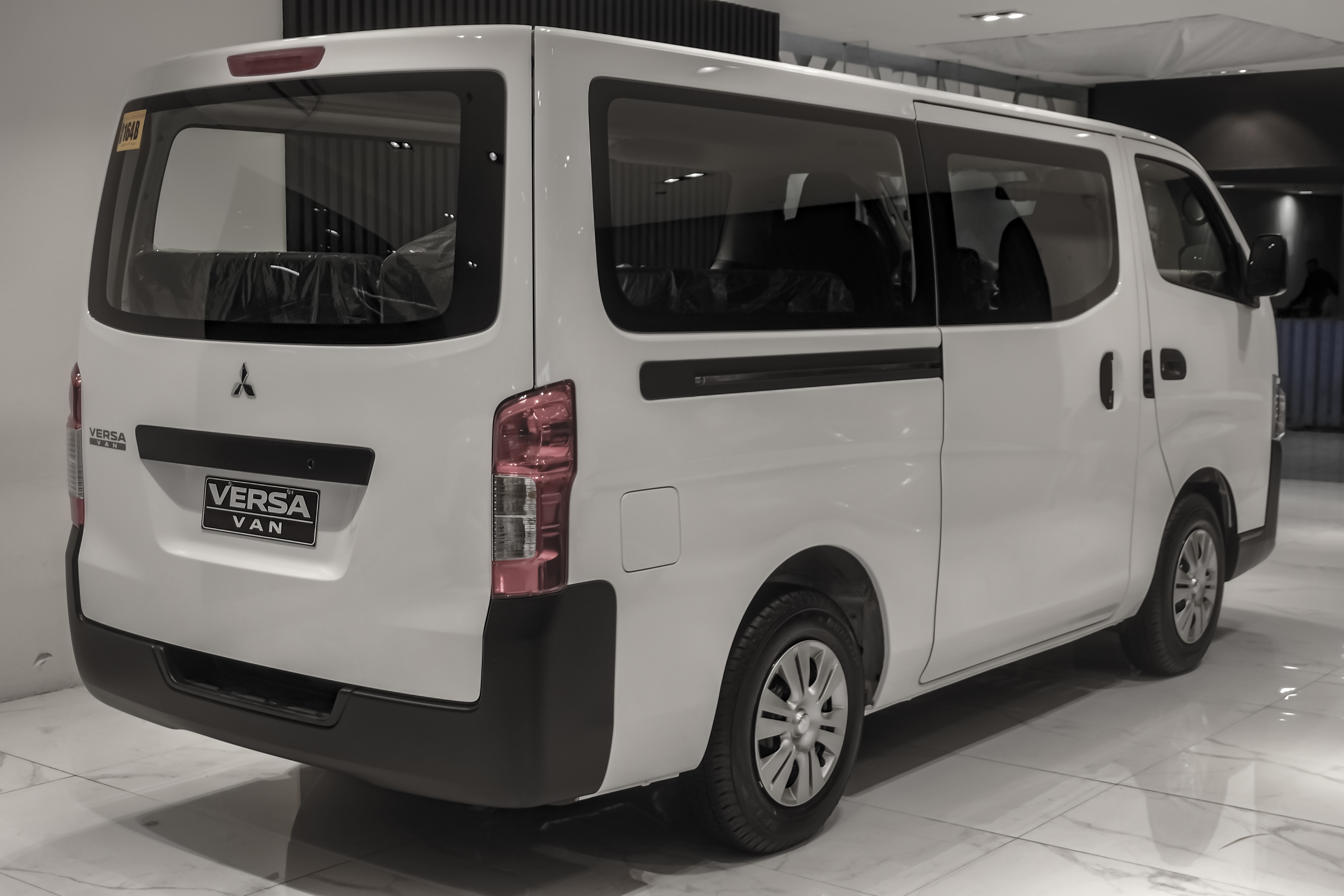
Mitsubishi Versa Van GLX
