= Lancia Megagamma =

Concept car designed by Italdesign

- 1978 Lancia Megagamma

Overview
- Manufacturer: Lancia
- Production: 1978
- Designer: Giorgetto Giugiaro at Italdesign

Body and chassis
- Class: Concept compact MPV
- Body style: 5-door minivan
- Layout: FF layout
- Related: Lancia Gamma

Powertrain
- Engine: 2.5 L 2484 cc Lancia H4

Dimensions
- Wheelbase: 2,670 mm (105.1 in)
- Length: 4,310 mm (169.7 in)
- Width: 1,780 mm (70.1 in)
- Height: 1,617 mm (63.7 in)
- Curb weight: 1,040 kg (2,293 lb)

Chronology
- Successor: Lancia Zeta; Lancia Musa

The Lancia Megagamma is a small, almost one-box, concept MPV, designed by Italdesign and introduced at the 1978 Turin Motor Show. In retrospect the Megagamma was more influential on later designs than it was itself successful, becoming the "conceptual birth mother of the MPV/minivan movement."

Featuring high seating h-points measured both off the vehicle floor as well as the pavement and a 0.34 coefficient of drag, the Megagamma used a front engined, front-wheel drive layout based on the Lancia Gamma platform with a Lancia SOHC 2.5 litre flat-4 engine and Bosch L-Jetronic fuel injection.

Italdesign showed an enduring commitment to exploring one-box designs, having preceded the Megagamma with the 1976 Alfa Romeo New York Taxi concept and followed the Megagamma with the 1982 Capsula, 2000 Maserati Buran and 2010 Proton EMAS.

The Megagamma itself presaged many attributes of the modern MPVs — notably a roomy but compact, flexible cabin with a flat floor not unlike such notable antecedents as the Volkswagen Type 2 (1950) and the DKW Schnellaster (1949-1962) and such notable succeeding mini/compact MPV's as the Nissan Prairie (1981), Fiat 500L (2011) and Mitsubishi Chariot (1983) — as well as a wide array of similarly sized and larger MPVs including the Renault Espace, Honda Shuttle and Chrysler minivans.

At the time of its debut, Lancia's parent company, Fiat, viewed the concept as too risky and it did not reach production. However the tall, box-like styling language of the concept would appear again in Giugiaro's later supermini designs for Fiat in the form of the Panda (1980) and Uno (1983).

== See also ==
- Alfa Romeo New York Taxi
