= Alfa Romeo New York Taxi =

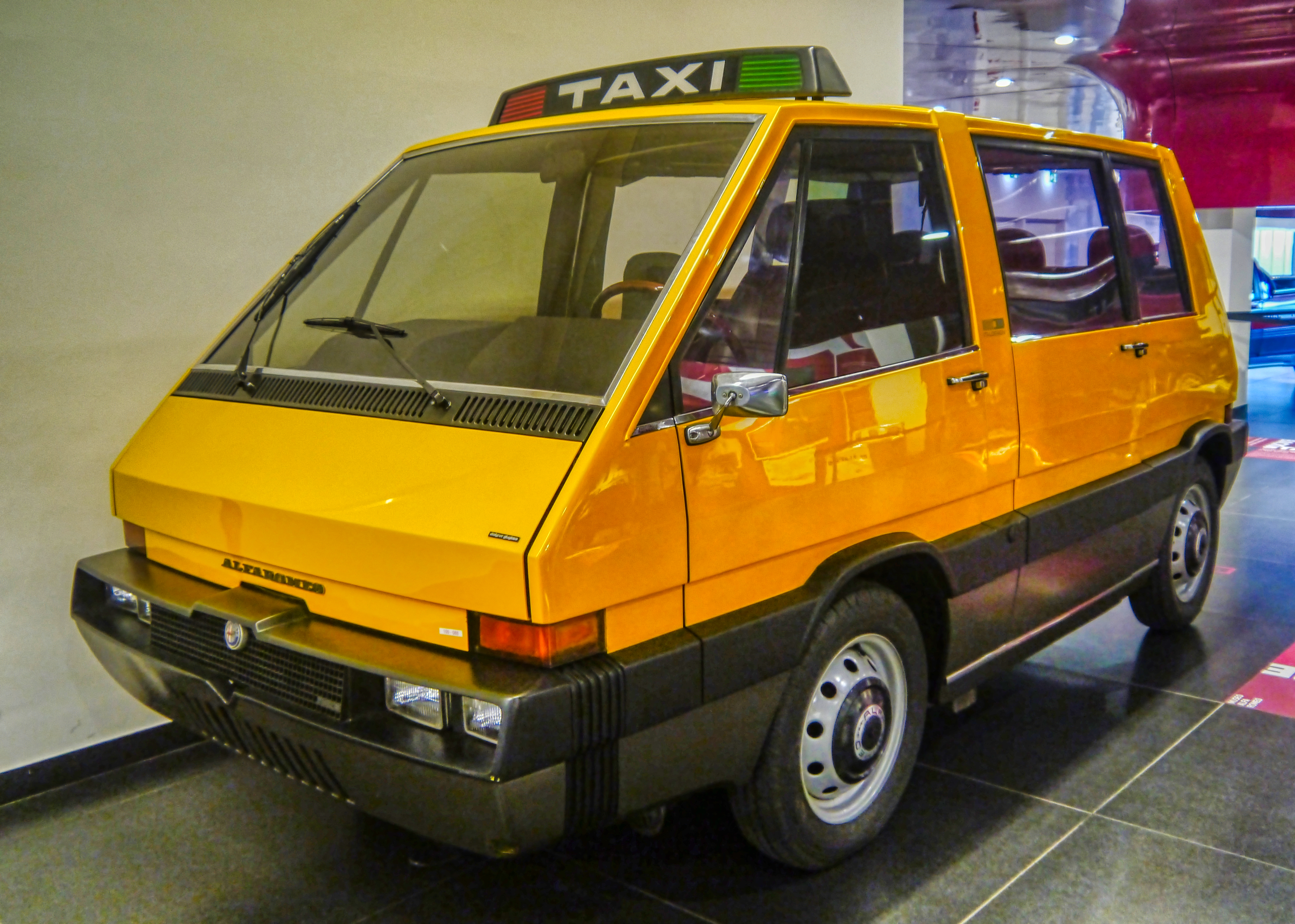
- Alfa Romeo New York Taxi on display at Museo Alfa Romeo

Overview
- Manufacturer: Alfa Romeo
- Production: 1976
- Designer: Giorgetto Giugiaro (Italdesign)

Body and chassis
- Body style: 5-door MPV

Dimensions
- Wheelbase: 90.5 in (2,299 mm)
- Length: 159.6 in (4,054 mm)

The Alfa Romeo New York Taxi is a concept car designed by Italdesign in 1976 at the invitation of the New York Museum of Modern Art. The concept was designed to a brief from the museum aimed at producing a cleaner, more efficient, safer and more user friendly taxi.

The New York Taxi was designed to be as compact as possible, while still being able to fit five passengers and baggage. Italdesign claims the concept takes up 30% less area than a conventional yellow cab of the time without sacrificing space. Another goal of the project was to improve ease of loading and unloading, particularly for mothers, elderly and disabled people. For this reason, the taxi featured flat floor space for wheelchair storage under the seats, a retractable ramp for wheelchairs and baby carriages, and a sliding door on the curb facing side. It could seat five people in the rear, with three facing forward and two facing backward on folding seats. All five seats were equipped with seatbelts and head rests for safety, as well as dual fixed armrests for the rear facing seats, and folding center armrests for the front facing ones. To the right of the driver seat there is extra space for carrying baggage. The exterior features a wide rubber belt around the car for improved crash safety and protection from dents and scrapes from minor collisions.

The concept was based on the front-wheel-drive running gear of the Alfa Romeo F12 van, including a 1.3-litre petrol engine mounted directly over the front wheels, and independent suspension in both the front and rear.

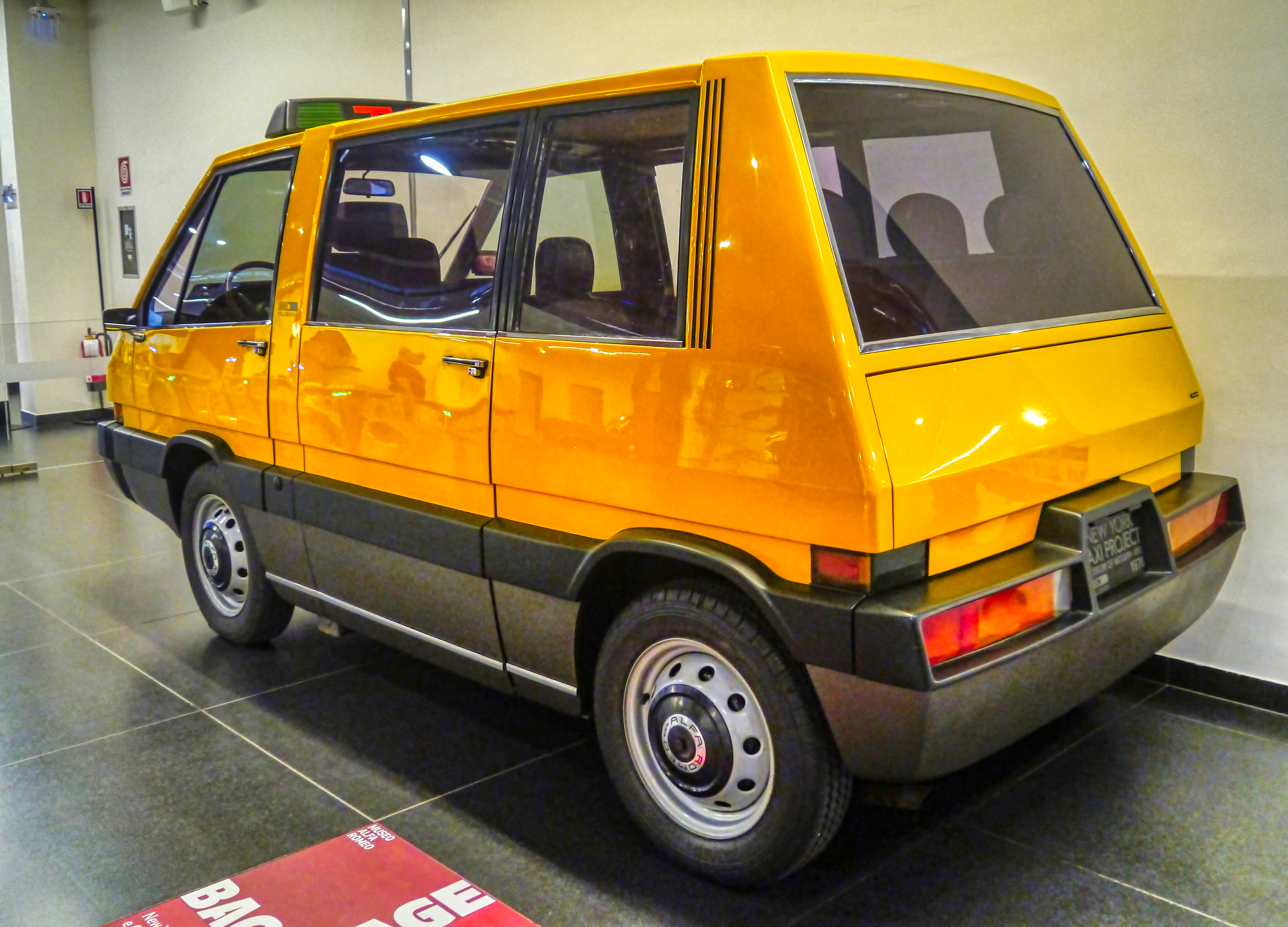
Rear view

Some of the design principles explored in the taxi were expanded upon with the Lancia Megagamma, which was a less boxy, more streamlined prototype that gave form to the modern multi-purpose vehicle (MPV).

== See also ==
- Volvo City Taxi
