= Volvo City Taxi =

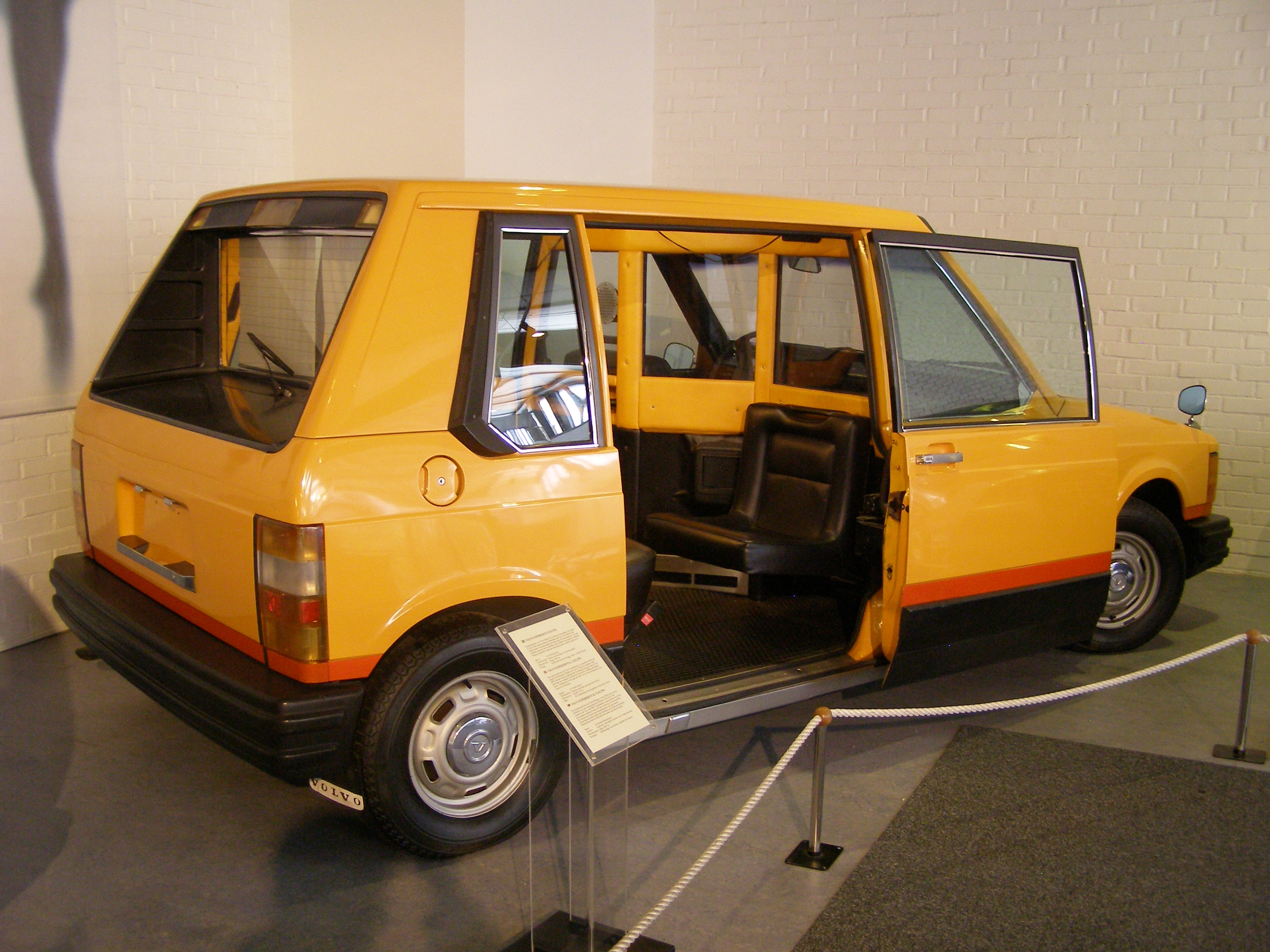
Volvo Experimental Taxi (April 2014)

The Volvo Experimental Taxi is a concept car built by Volvo in 1976. It was designed as Volvo’s response to a design brief sent out by the New York Museum of Modern Art that solicited major auto manufacturers to come up with concepts for a cleaner, more efficient, safer, and more user friendly taxi.

The Taxi is powered by a six cylinder diesel engine which drove the front wheels. It was designed to be able to fit a wheelchair inside, and features a sliding door on the passenger/curb side that slides forward. Volvo say they built the taxi according to their “safety cage” principle, with a reinforced passenger area and front and rear crumple zones. The taxi also featured federally mandated 5 mph impact bumpers, as well as a rubber strip running around the car to protect it from scratches and dents. Instead of seat belts, the passenger seating was provided with a roller coaster style pull down bar. The concept also featured short overhangs and a tall design, which Volvo says improve the turning circle, and make it take up less area than a conventional cab, without sacrificing interior space.

== See also ==
- Alfa Romeo New York Taxi
