= Honda Odyssey (international) =

Minivan for international markets

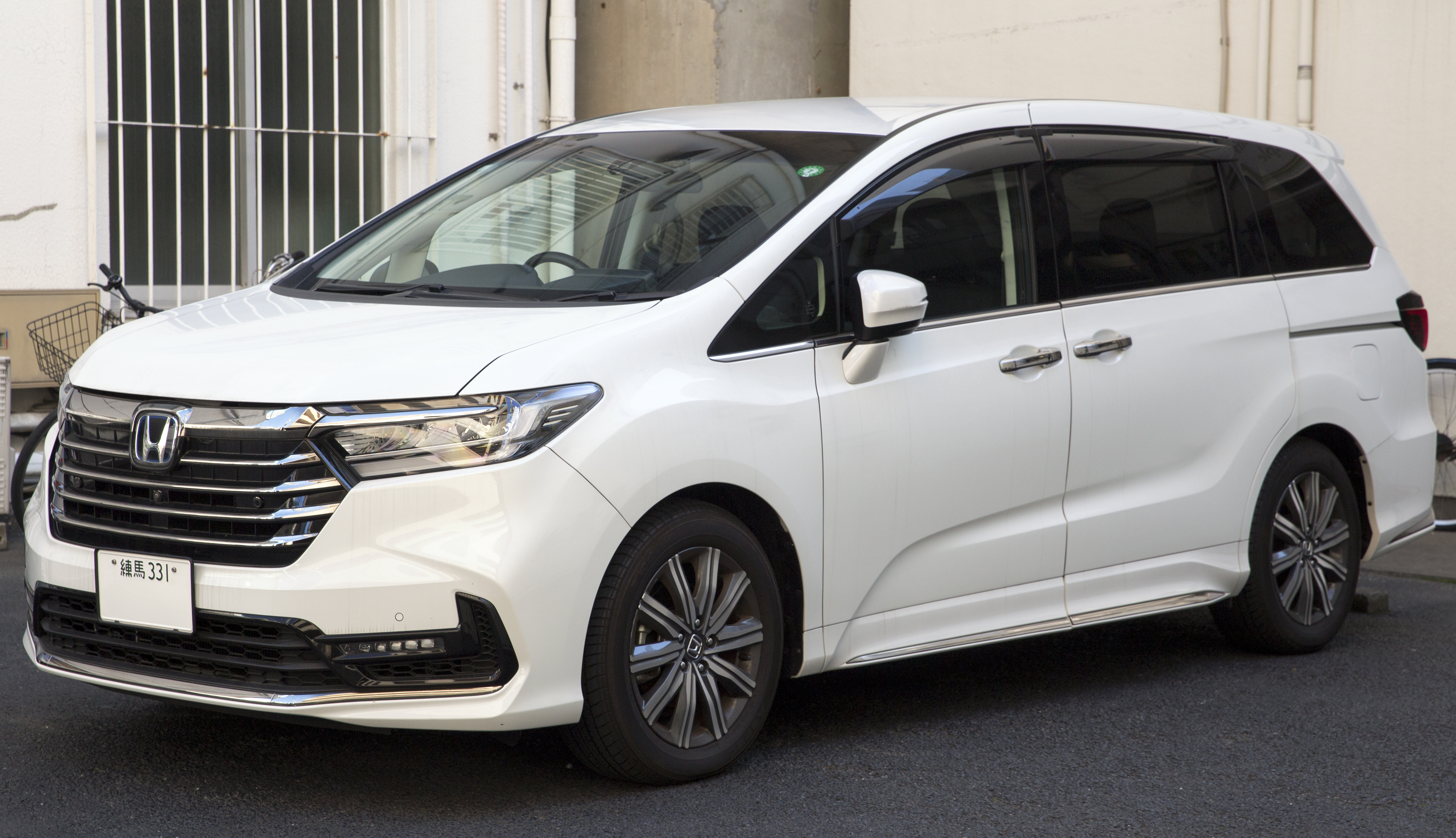
- Fifth-generation Honda Odyssey (second facelift)

Overview
- Manufacturer: Honda
- Production: 1994–present

Body and chassis
- Class: Minivan
- Body style: 5-door station wagon (1994–2013); 5-door minivan (2013–present)
- Layout: Front-engine, front-wheel-drive Front-engine, four-wheel-drive

The Honda Odyssey (Japanese: ホンダ・オデッセイ, Hepburn: Honda Odessei) is a minivan manufactured by Japanese automaker Honda since 1994, marketed in most of the world and currently in its fifth generation.

The Odyssey had originally been conceived and engineered in Japan, in the wake of the country's economic crisis of the 1990s, which in turn imposed severe constraints on the vehicle's size and overall concept, dictating the minivan's manufacture in an existing facility with minimal modification. The result was a smaller minivan, in the compact MPV class, that was well received in the Japanese domestic market but less well received in North America. The first generation Odyssey was marketed in Europe as the Honda Shuttle.

Subsequent generations diverged to reflect market variations, and Honda built a plant in Lincoln, Alabama, incorporating the ability to manufacture larger models. Since model year 1999, Honda has marketed a larger (large MPV-class) Odyssey in North America and a smaller Odyssey in Japan and other markets. Honda also offered the larger North American Odyssey in Japan as the Honda LaGreat between 1999 and 2004.

== First generation (RA1–RA5; 1994) ==
First generation
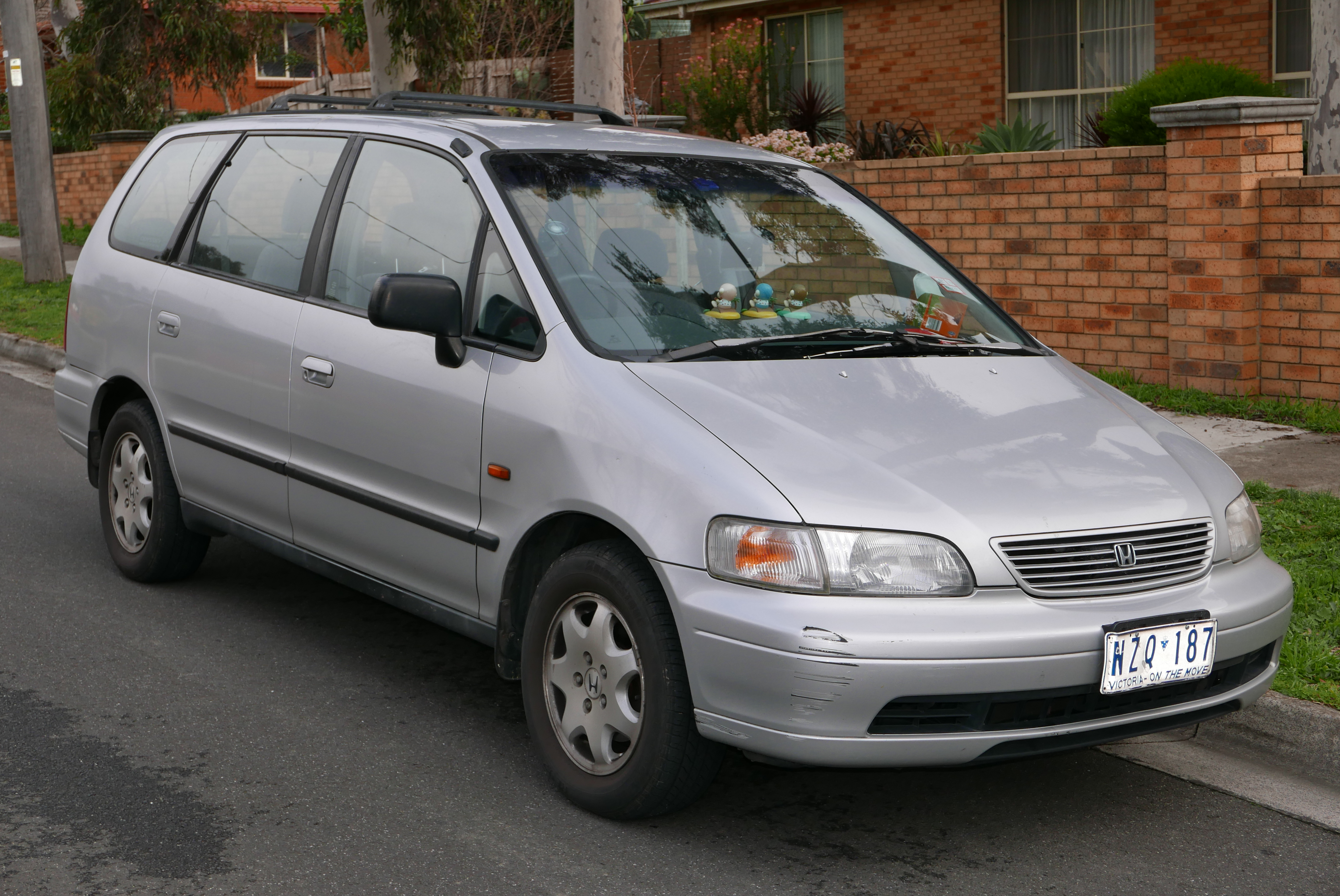
- 1996 Odyssey (pre-facelift, Australia)

Overview
- Model code: RA1; RA2; RA3; RA4; RA5
- Also called: Honda Shuttle (Europe); Isuzu Oasis
- Production: 1994–1999
- Assembly: Japan: Sayama
- Designer: Motoaki Minowa (1991)

Body and chassis
- Body style: 5-door station wagon
- Related: Honda Accord (fifth generation)

Powertrain
- Engine: Petrol: 2.2 L F22B6 VTEC I4; 2.3 L F23A7 VTEC I4; 3.0 L J30A3 VTEC V6
- Transmission: 4-speed automatic

Dimensions
- Wheelbase: 2,830 mm (111.4 in)
- Length: 4,750 mm (187.0 in)
- Width: 1,770 mm (69.7 in)
- Height: 1,645–1,660 mm (64.8–65.4 in)
- Curb weight: 1,470–1,610 kg (3,241–3,549 lb)

Chronology
- Successor: Honda Odyssey (RA6-RA9; International); Honda Odyssey (RL1; North America)

The first-generation Odyssey was a Multi-Purpose Vehicle from Honda that was launched in Japan and North America in 1994. Based on the fifth-generation Accord sedan, it was offered with an optional 4WD (with RA2 and RA4 chassis), and from 1997 with a 3.0-litre V6 J30A engine with the RA5 chassis code (front-wheel drive only). L and Aero models were equipped with a sunroof. All the JDM Odysseys had a dual air conditioning system, separate for the front and rear seat rows. Since the first generation all the models have been six- or seven-seater versions.

In 1995, it won the Automotive Researchers' and Journalists' Conference Car of the Year award in Japan. In its home market, the Odyssey competed with the Toyota Gaia, Toyota Ipsum and the Nissan Presage. European sales were hampered by the absences of both a manual transmission as well as a diesel engine option.

The original 2.2-litre engine produces 130 PS (96 kW; 128 hp). This was replaced by a slightly larger 2.3-litre version offering 150 PS (110 kW; 148 hp) in August 1997. In October 1997, the 200 PS (147 kW; 197 hp) V6 engine became an option in the domestic market.

The Japanese market Odyssey was initially available in B, S and L grade levels. In January 1996, the top-of-the-line Exclusive model has been added. In October 1996, the M grade was added which positioned between the lower S grade and the higher L grade, and the base B grade was discontinued.

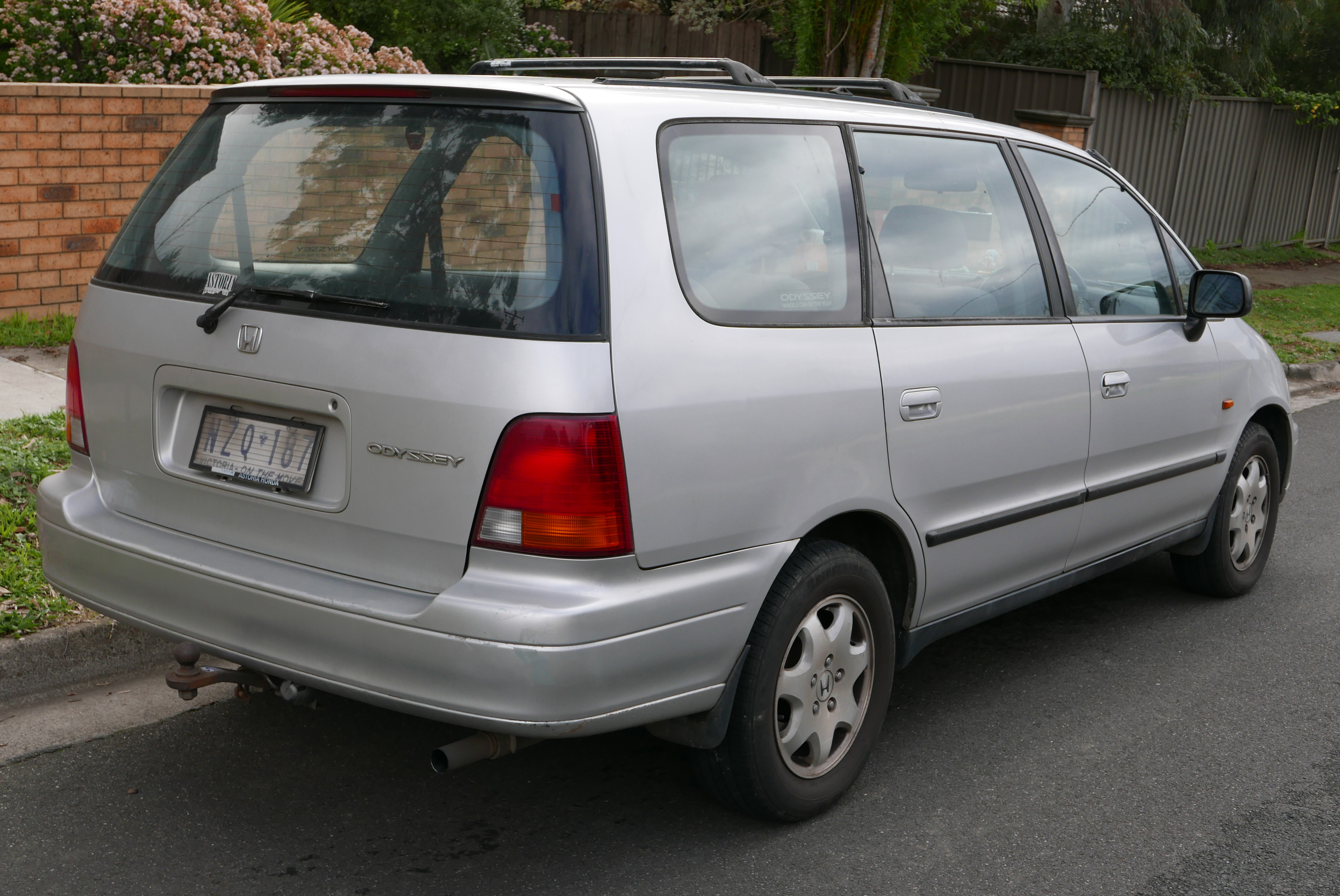
Rear view (pre-facelift)

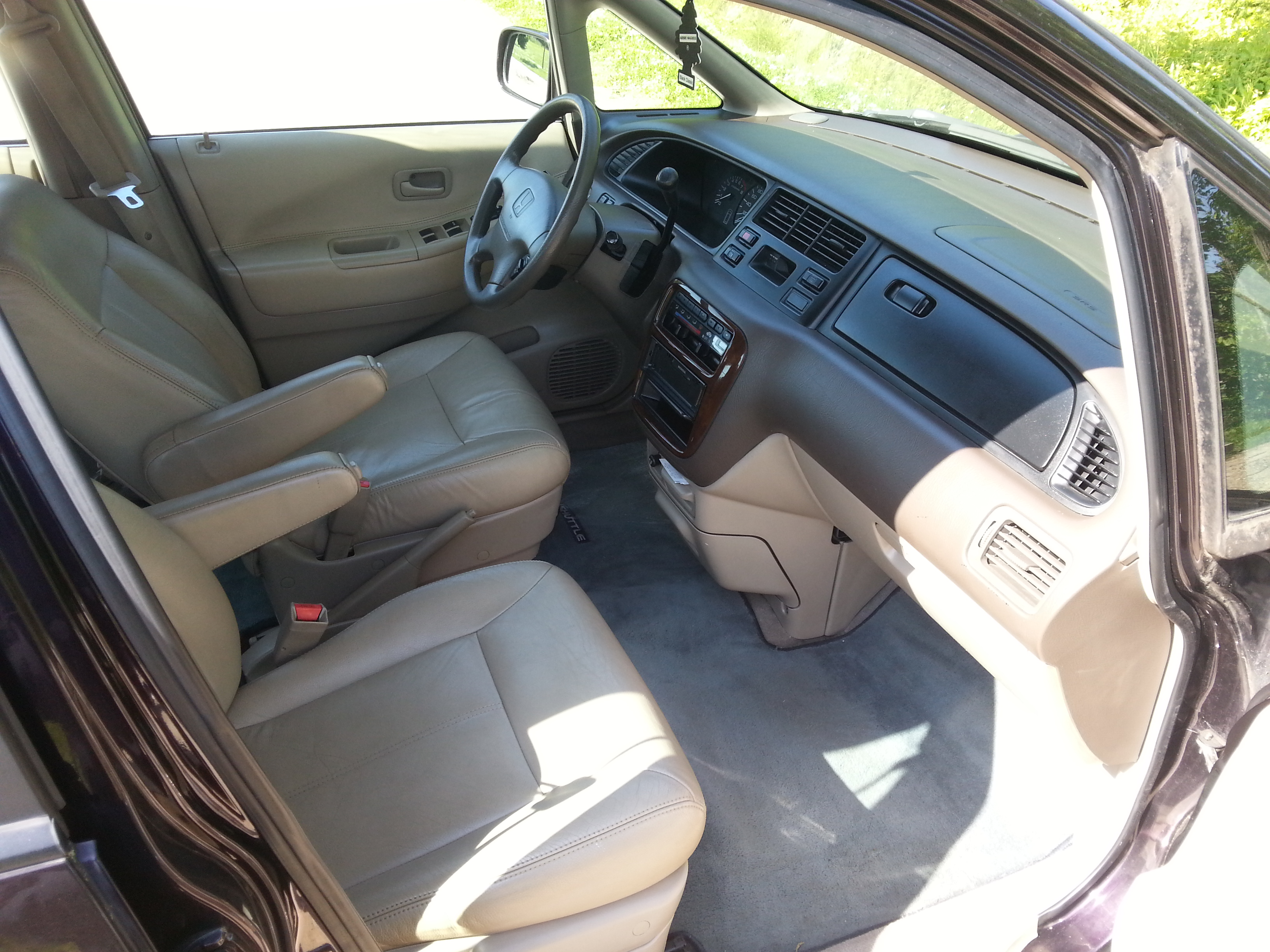
Interior (Shuttle, Europe)

=== 1997 facelift ===
When the facelifted model arrived in August 1997, the Exclusive grade was discontinued, and later replaced in October 1997 with the Prestige model in VG and VZ grade levels.

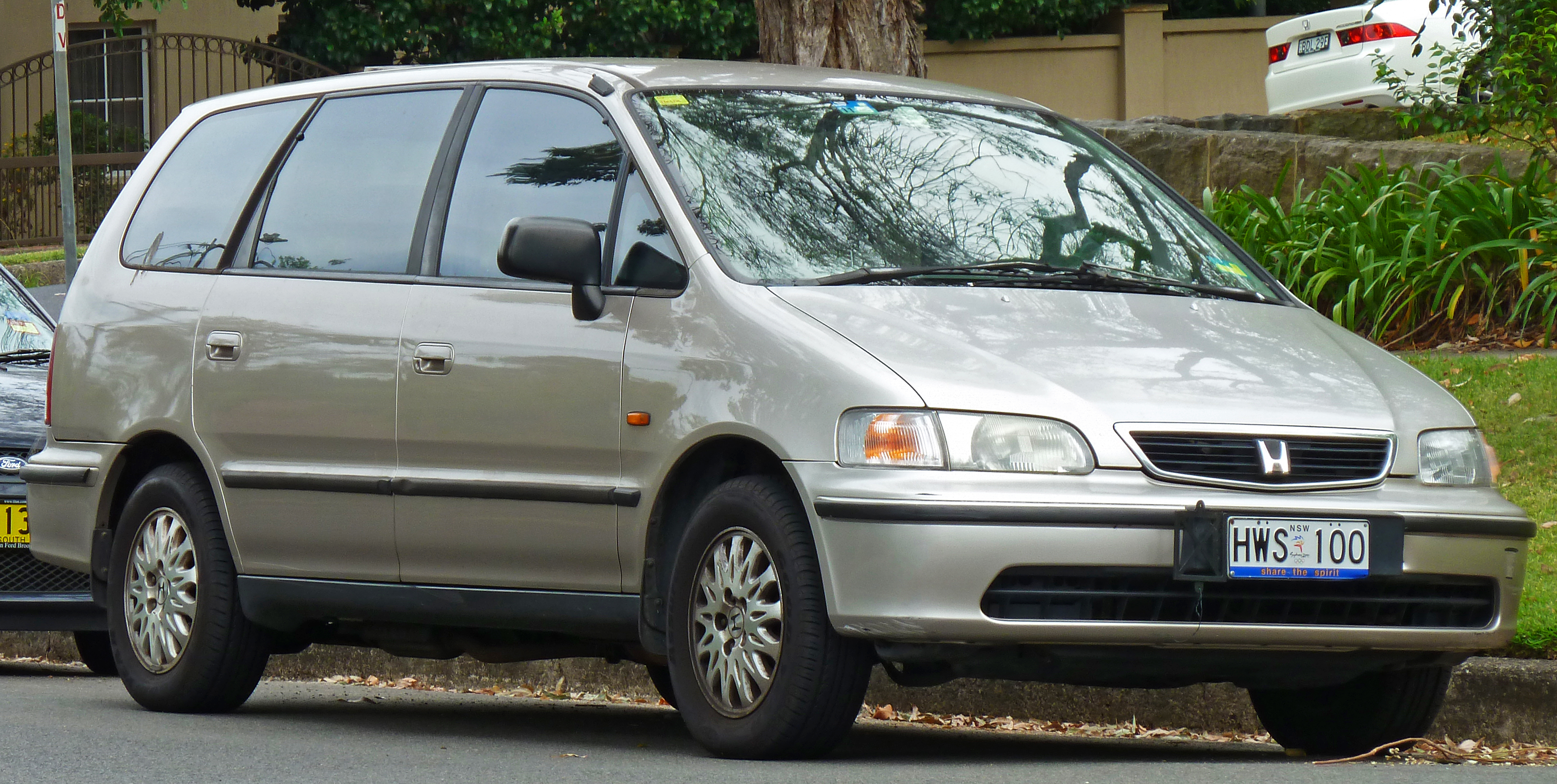
Odyssey (facelift, Australia)

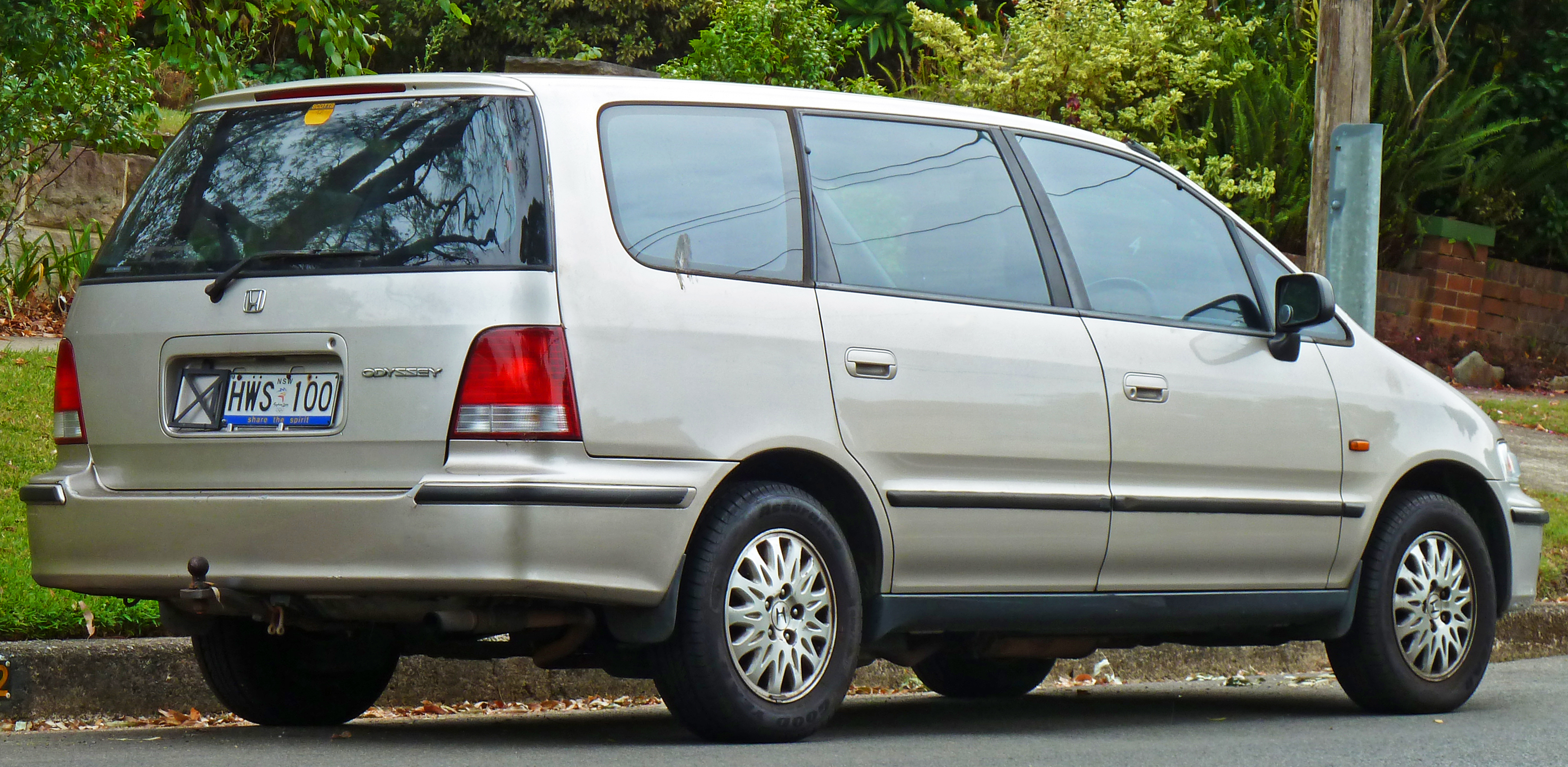
Odyssey (facelift, Australia)

== Second generation (RA6–RA9; 1999) ==
Second generation
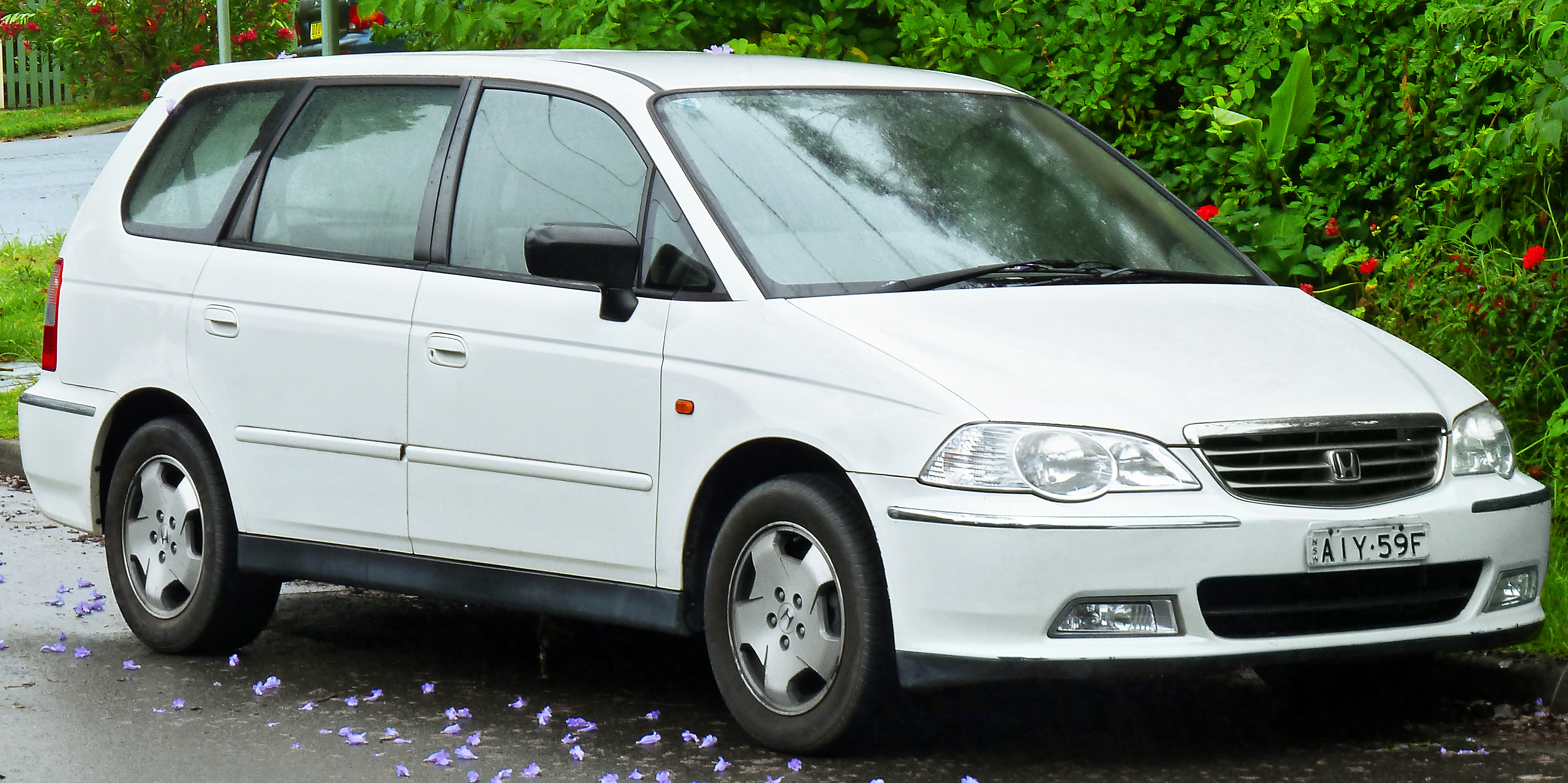
- Odyssey (pre-facelift, Australia)

Overview
- Model code: RA6; RA7; RA8; RA9
- Production: 1999–2003
- Assembly: Japan: Sayama; China: Guangzhou (Guangqi Honda)

Body and chassis
- Body style: 5-door station wagon
- Related: Honda Accord (sixth generation)

Powertrain
- Engine: Petrol: 2.3 L F23A I4; 3.0 L J30A V6
- Transmission: 4/5-speed automatic

Dimensions
- Wheelbase: 2,830 mm (111.4 in)
- Length: 4,770–4,835 mm (187.8–190.4 in)
- Width: 1,795–1,800 mm (70.7–70.9 in)
- Height: 1,630–1,655 mm (64.2–65.2 in)
- Curb weight: 1,570–1,760 kg (3,461–3,880 lb)

In December 1999, a new, larger second-generation Odyssey appeared in Japan and Australia and in a left-hand drive format for China. However, this new Odyssey was a major upgrade of the first-generation Odyssey rather than a completely new model. As a result, its overall shape and appearance were similar to the first-generation Odyssey. Still, it was 85 mm (3.3 in) longer and 10 mm (0.4 in) wider than the previous model. While base models had slightly smaller dimensions and a smaller 2.3L engine, models with more options as well those with the 3.0L V6 engine featured slightly larger bumpers and chrome inserts, larger grille as well as a unique chrome number plate surround.

The base model continued to be sold with a 2.3-litre VTEC four-cylinder engine (F23A) in RA6 (2WD) and RA7 (4WD) models. The 3.0-litre J30A VTEC V6 engine from the first-generation, now producing 210 PS (154 kW), was available in the RA8 (2WD) and RA9 (4WD) Absolute sport and Prestige luxury models. The 2000 Odyssey was the first Honda to receive a five-speed automatic transmission, albeit with the 3.0-litre engine only as the four-cylinder versions utilised the four-speed automatic transmission. All the second generation gearboxes also featured another first — a tiptronic-like manual mode, known as "Honda S-matic", in which a gearbox remains the classic Honda hydro-automat, but the driver is able to manage the shifting moment (if electronically allowed) with the selector's "+" and "-" positions. The interior was completely new. The old automatic column shifter was moved to the centre console. A new touchscreen-based digital climate control system replaced the old manual controls, which worked in conjunction with Honda's new navigation system. Woodgrain trim was standard on all models, while in VG/VZ V6 models leather and velour seat and door materials were standard over the basic cloth trims. The interior configuration was also changed (second and third row), and the spare wheel was moved to a new position beneath the third row. With L and Absolute versions, an additional third-row heater was added. The sunroof was no longer available respectively.

The Japanese market Odyssey continued to be available in S, M and L grade levels, as well as Prestige model in VG and VZ grade levels.

In the Australian market, the new Odyssey proved more popular than its predecessor, at least initially. However, in 2002, sales hit an all-time low, and in 2003, sales of only 649 units were almost one-third of the total in 2000.

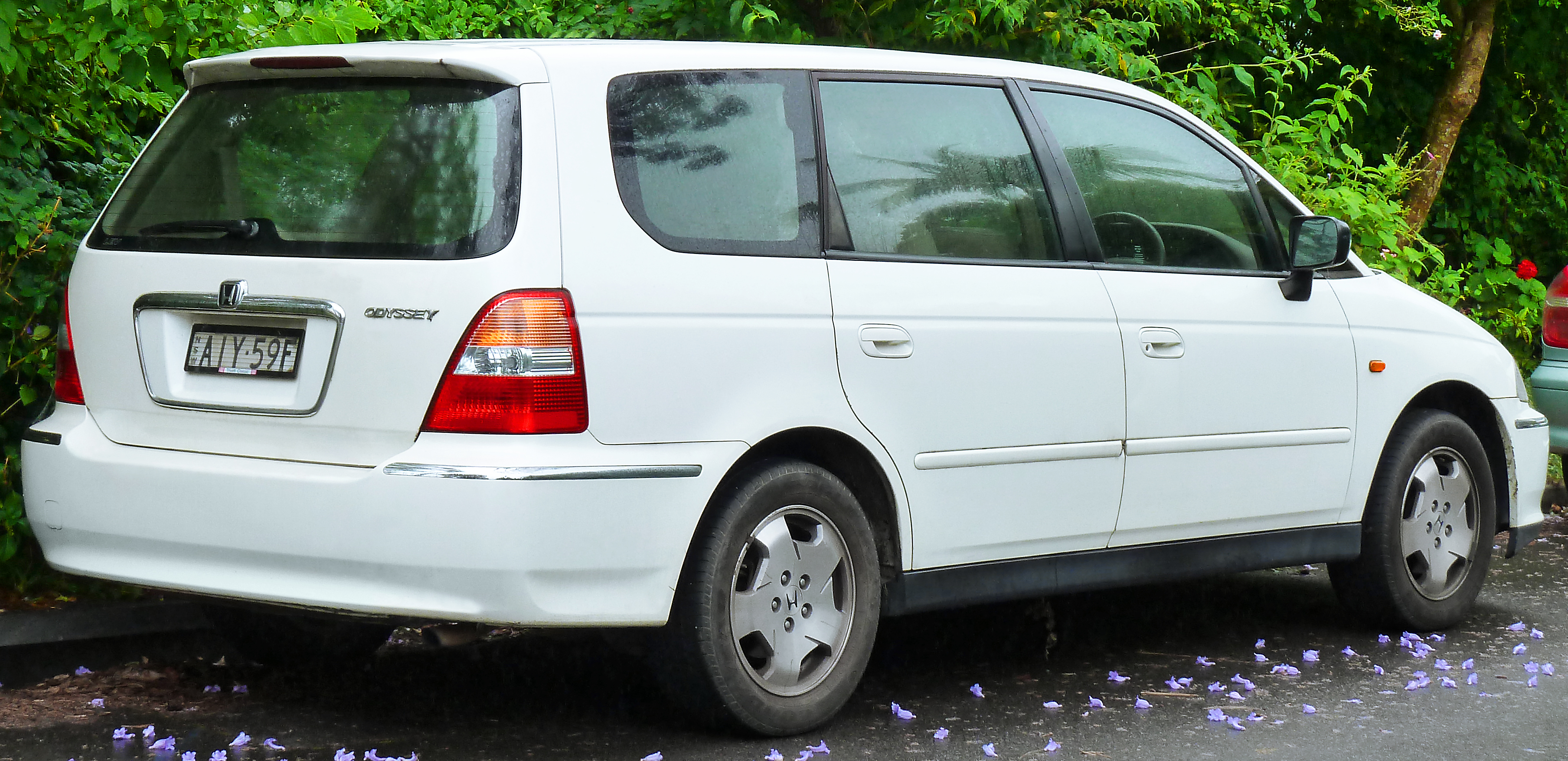
Rear view (pre-facelift)

=== 2001 facelift ===
In November 2001, the Odyssey was given a mild restyle. The MQ grade was added to the regular four-cylinder Odyssey lineup which positioned between the lower M grade and the higher L grade, and also introduced the new, sportier Absolute model that is positioned between regular and Prestige models. It received new, larger Honda emblems for the front and rear, clear-lens tail lights (replacing the amber indicators) and redesigned front grille and bumper as well as new alloy wheel design options. The Absolute model further debuts a more sporty design with body kit and darker lens tail lights. It is available with the F23A 2.3-litre four-cylinder as standard in RA6/RA7 chassis, or optional 3.0-litre J30A V6 engine in the RA8/RA9 chassis.

In February 2003, the Premium Sound Spirit variant which based on the MQ grade went on sale in Japan. It is equipped with a Bose sound system, 16-inch aluminium wheels, and forged-metal-style interior trim.

In May 2003, the Fine Spirit variant was introduced, based on Absolute, Absolute Limited and M grades equipped with a special body colour and special aluminum wheels, forged-metal-style panel, and genuine leather and forged-metal-style combination steering wheel. In addition to adopting a special body colour, it is equipped with a metallic grey front grille, a chrome-plated outer door handle, and a special wood grain panel.

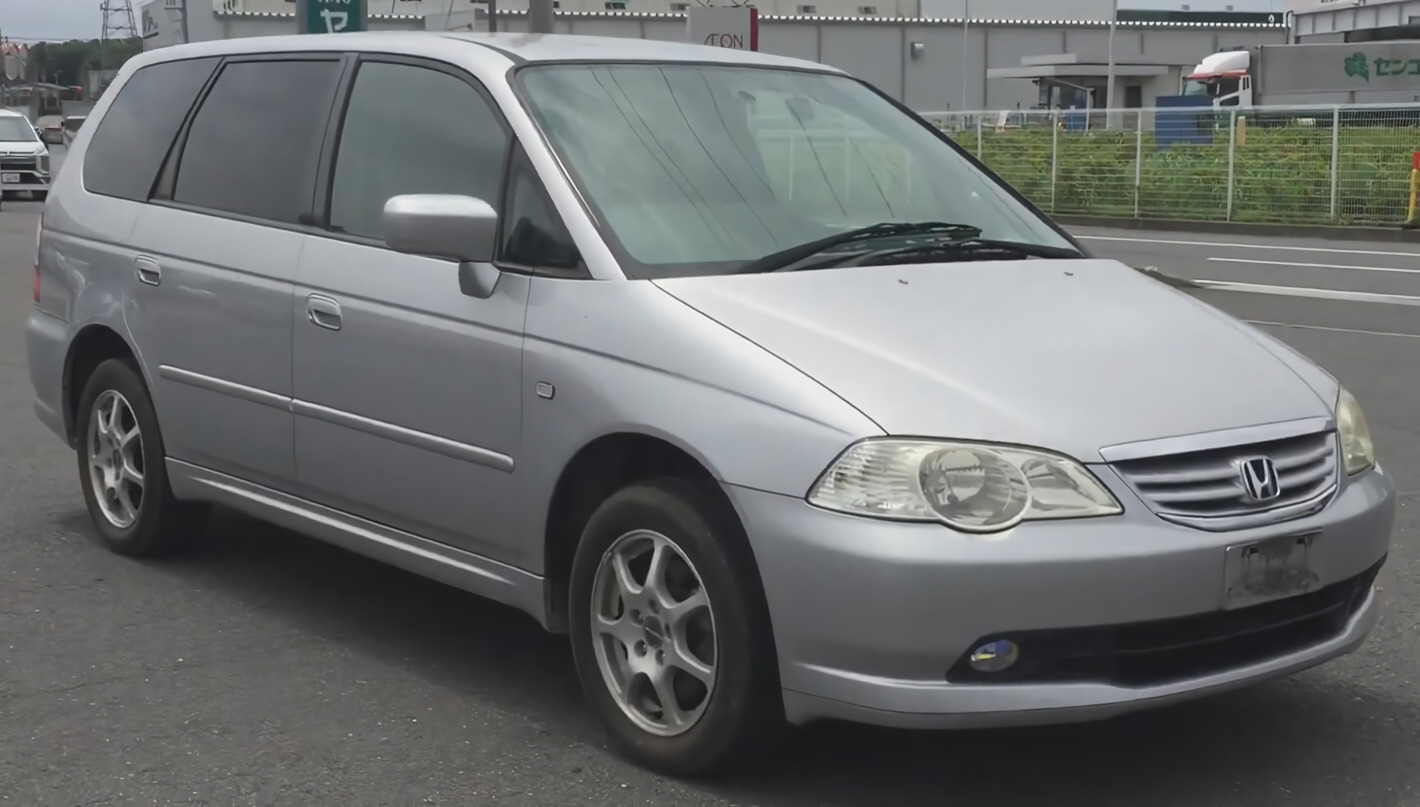
Odyssey (facelift, Japan)

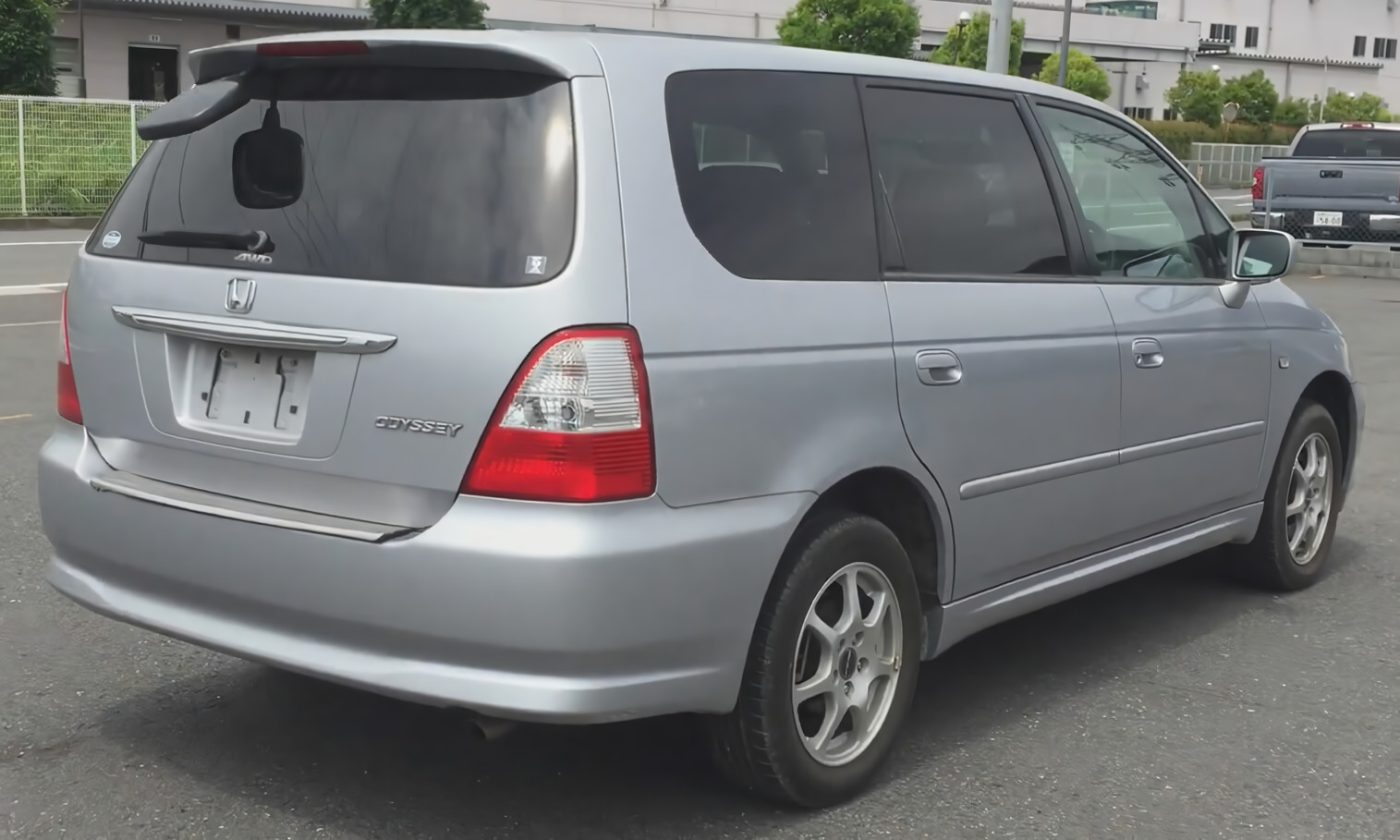
Odyssey (facelift, Japan)

== Third generation (RB1/2; 2003) ==
Third generation
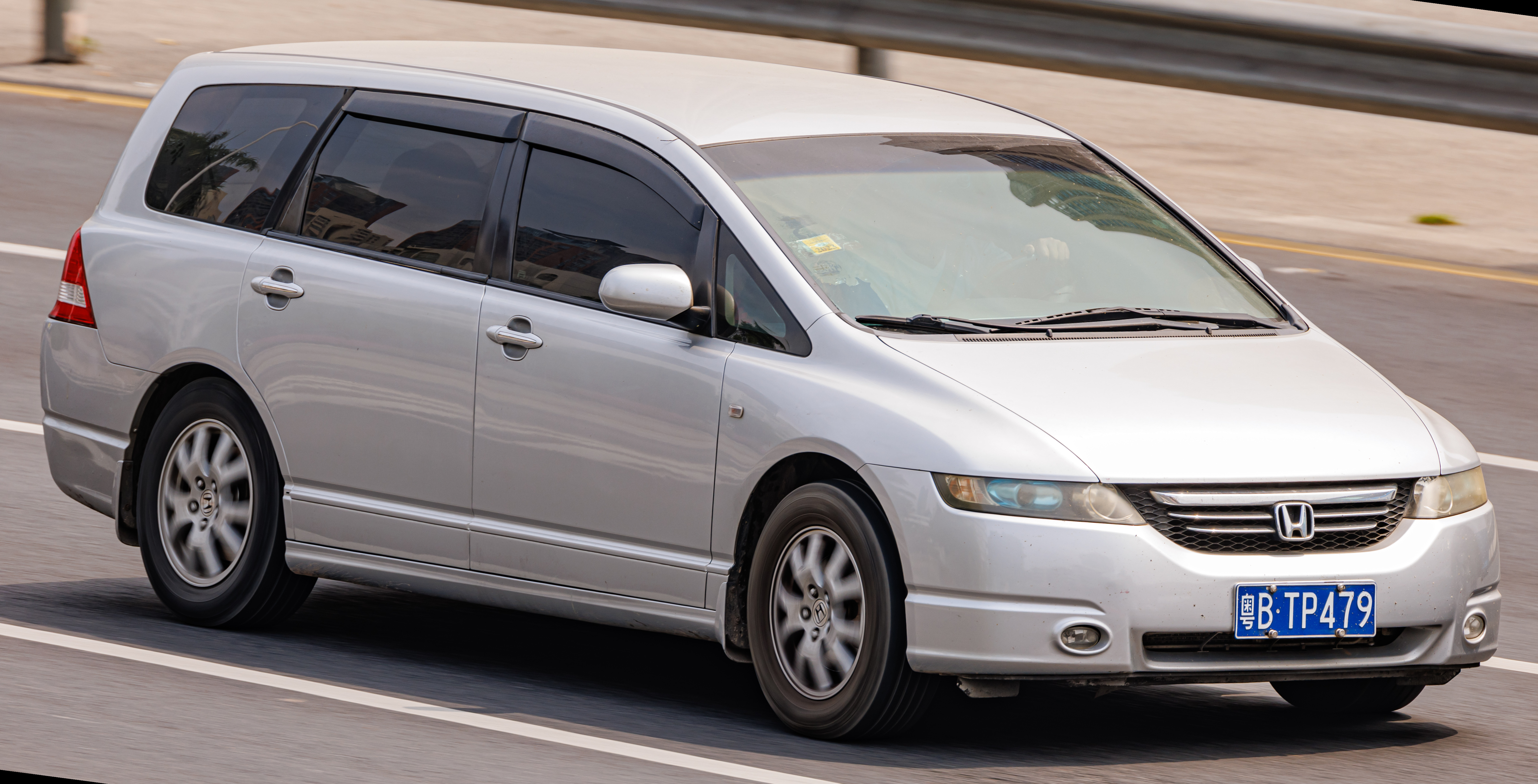
- Odyssey (pre-facelift, China)

Overview
- Model code: RB1; RB2
- Production: 2003–2008
- Assembly: Japan: Sayama; China: Guangzhou (Guangqi Honda)

Body and chassis
- Related: Honda Accord (Japan and Europe seventh generation); Honda Elysion (first generation)

Powertrain
- Engine: Petrol: 2.4 L K24A VTEC I4
- Transmission: 5-speed automatic CVT

Dimensions
- Wheelbase: 2,830 mm (111.4 in)
- Length: 4,765 mm (187.6 in)
- Width: 1,800 mm (70.9 in)
- Height: 1,550–1,570 mm (61.0–61.8 in)
- Curb weight: 1,610–1,760 kg (3,549–3,880 lb)

The third-generation Japanese-built Odyssey was the first full redesign of the Odyssey since its introduction in 1994. Going on sale in Japan in October 2003, and in Australia and many other countries from early 2004, it continued with a 5-door body style, with a much sleeker, lower, and more car-like appearance. For the first time cruise-control appeared on the JDM Odyssey. The 4WD version has received the new DPS system. The seat folding mechanism was changed again. The height of the new Odyssey was lower than ever – designed with multi-level parking in mind, particularly for Japan. The new Odyssey came with the Honda K24A i-VTEC engine, a 2.4-litre unit producing 160 PS (118 kW); this was the same engine used in the CR-V and Accord. A 4WD version (RB2) came only with an automatic transmission, while the 2WD version came only with a continuously variable transmission, except Absolute, JDM S/B model as well as export models. The V6 engine was dropped completely. Instead, a 200 PS (147 kW) variant of the K24A engine was adopted for the sporty Absolute version (190 PS (140 kW) with 4WD), which was only equipped with an automatic transmission – both the 2WD and 4WD variants. Moreover, this new engine had the same fuel consumption as the old 2.2 L engine. All this resulted in the new Odyssey becoming a sales success. In Australia, the Odyssey achieved its best-ever sales year in 2005 with a total of 3,543, and outsold the Toyota Tarago for the first time.

In Japan, the third-generation Odyssey was initially available in S, M, L and Absolute grade levels. In October 2005, the base S grade was discontinued and the Aero Edition based on the M grade with the same bumper as the Absolute grade has been released. For the facelifted model released in April 2006, the base B grade was revived (previously the lowest grade level of the pre-facelift first generation Odyssey) and the Aero Edition was replaced by the M Aero Package. In February 2007, the S grade was reinstated along with the S Aero Package, the M grade was equipped with 16-inch aluminium wheels, and the L grade was equipped with a voice recognition Honda HDD navigation system with a rear camera and a progressive commander. In August 2007, the K Package based on the L grade with genuine leather-wrapped AT select lever was added. At the same time, the "HDD Navi Special Edition" based on the S, S Aero Package, M, M Aero Package and Absolute grades with the same navigation system equipment as the L grade was released.

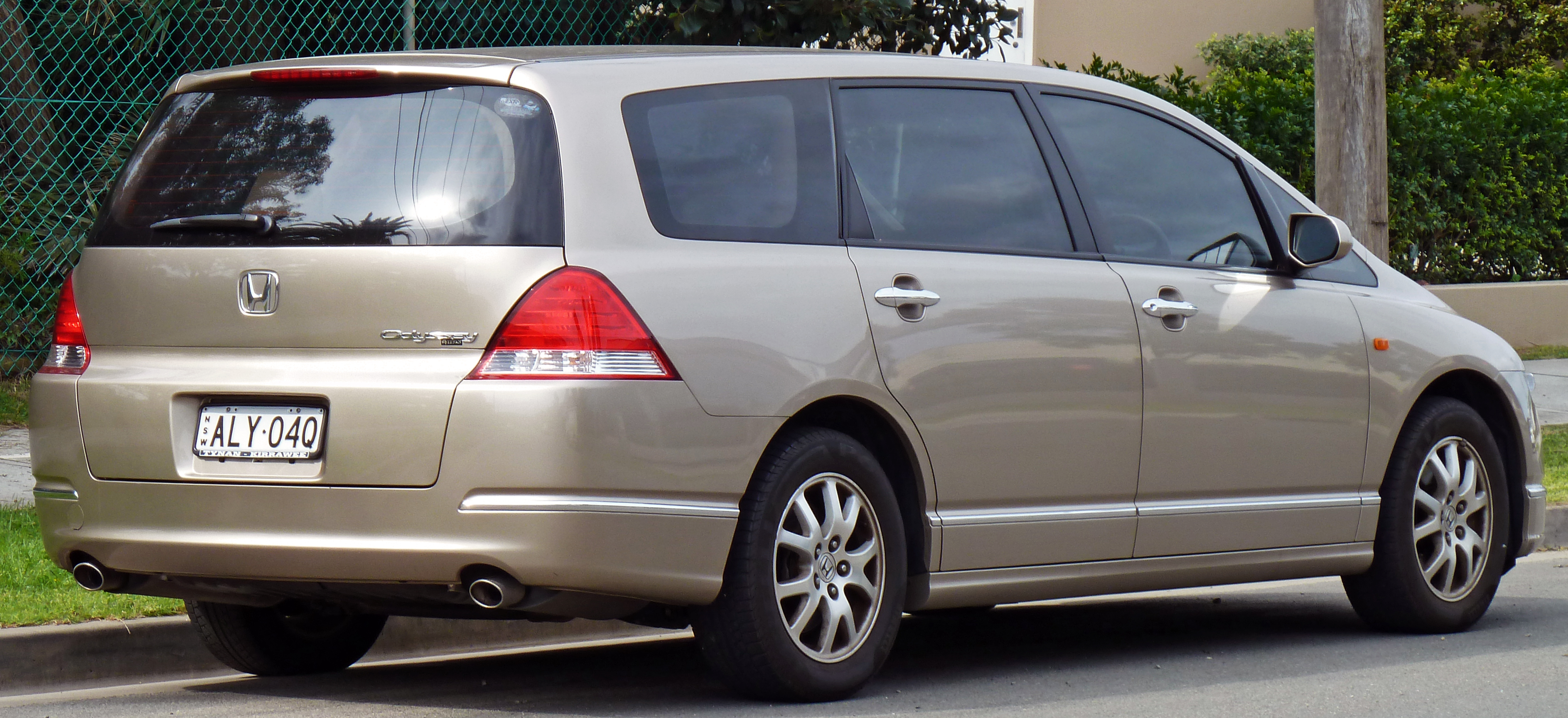
Odyssey Luxury (pre-facelift, Australia)

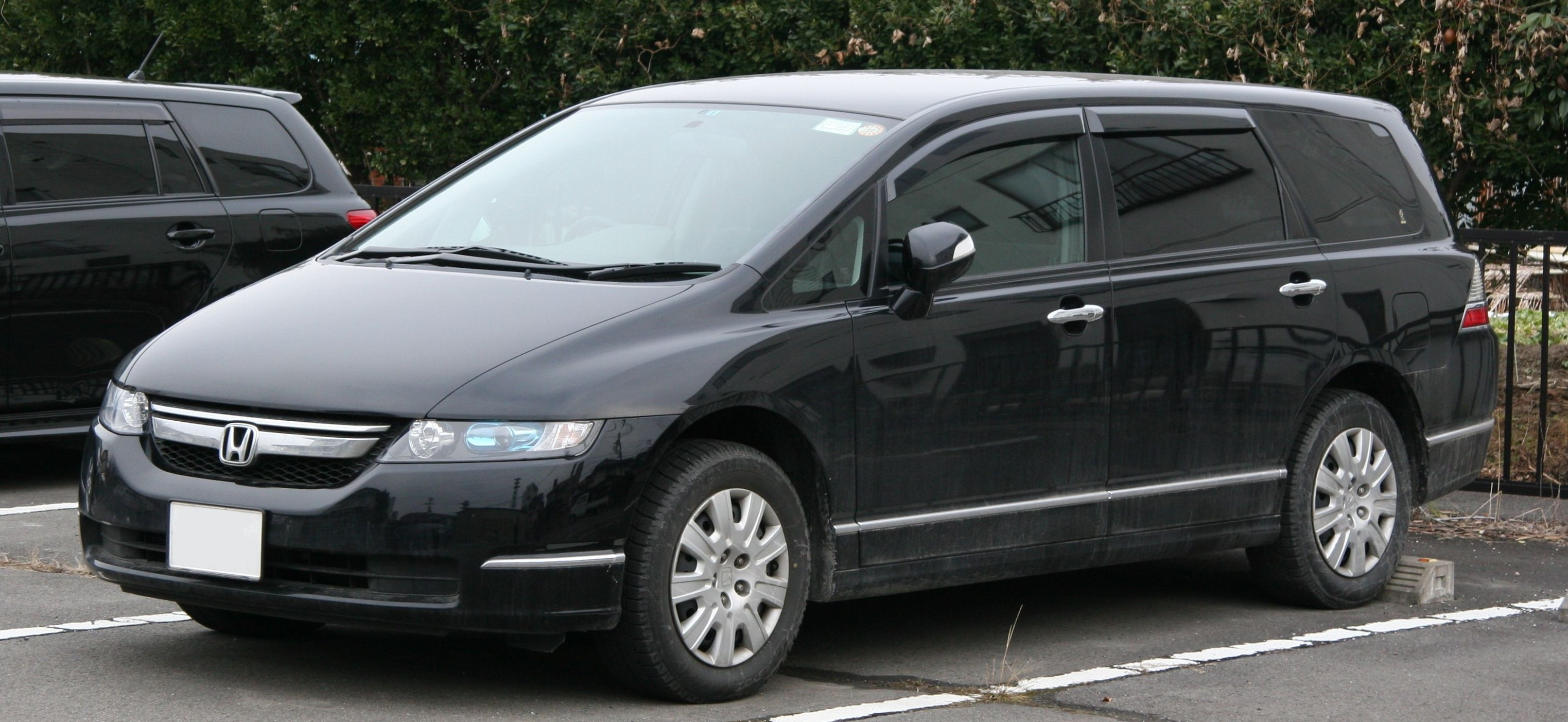
Odyssey (facelift, Japan)

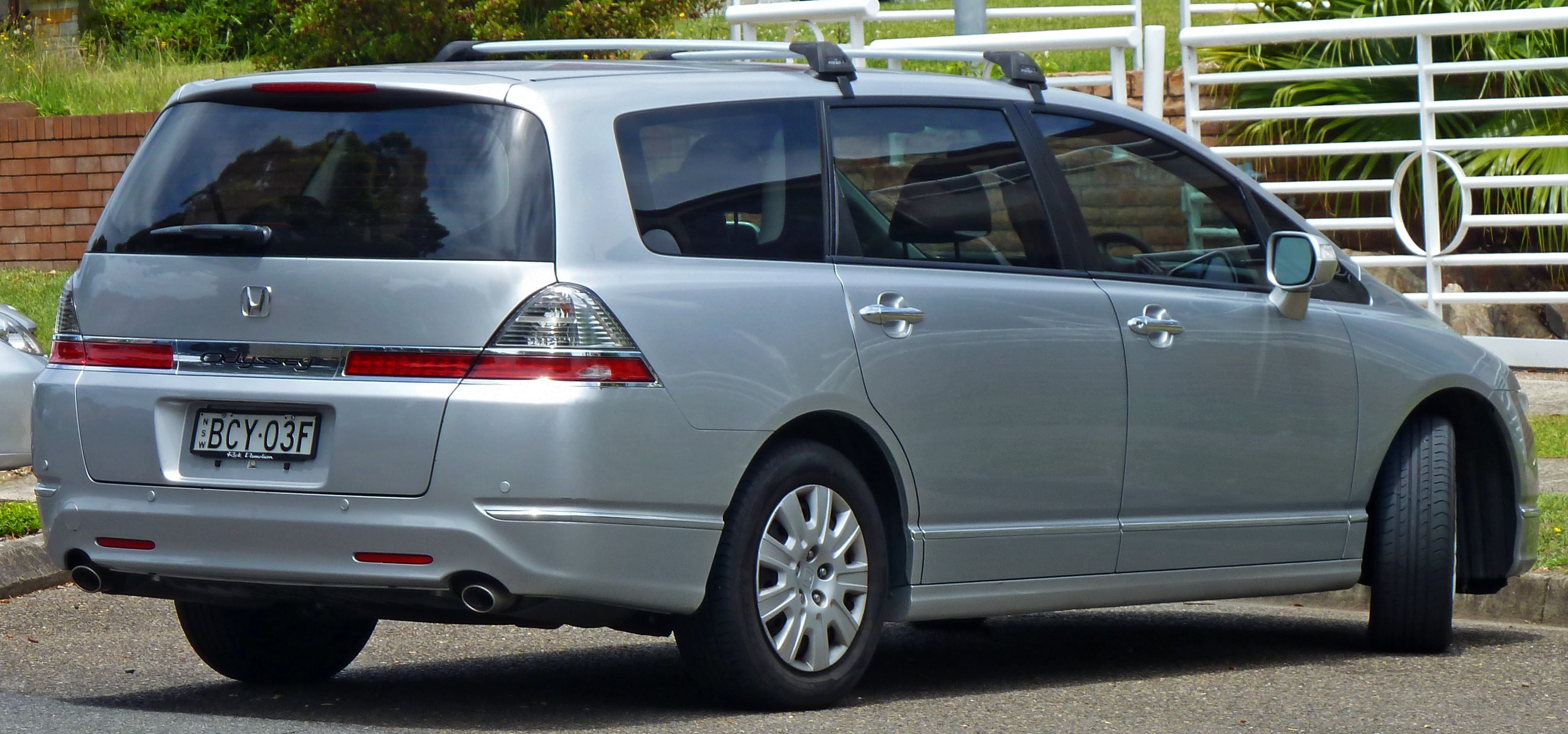
Odyssey (facelift, Australia)

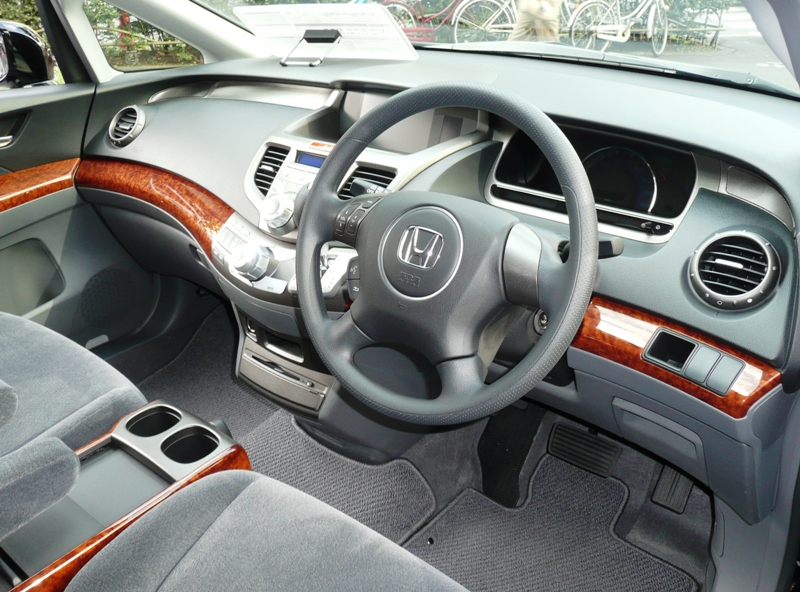
Interior

=== Safety ===
ANCAP test results* Honda Odyssey (2005)
Test	Score
Overall	4 /5 stars
Frontal offset	11.50/16
Side impact	16/16
Pole	Not Assessed
Seat belt reminders	0/3
Whiplash protection	Not Assessed
Pedestrian protection	Marginal
Electronic stability control	Not Available

== Fourth generation (RB3/4; 2008) ==
Fourth generation
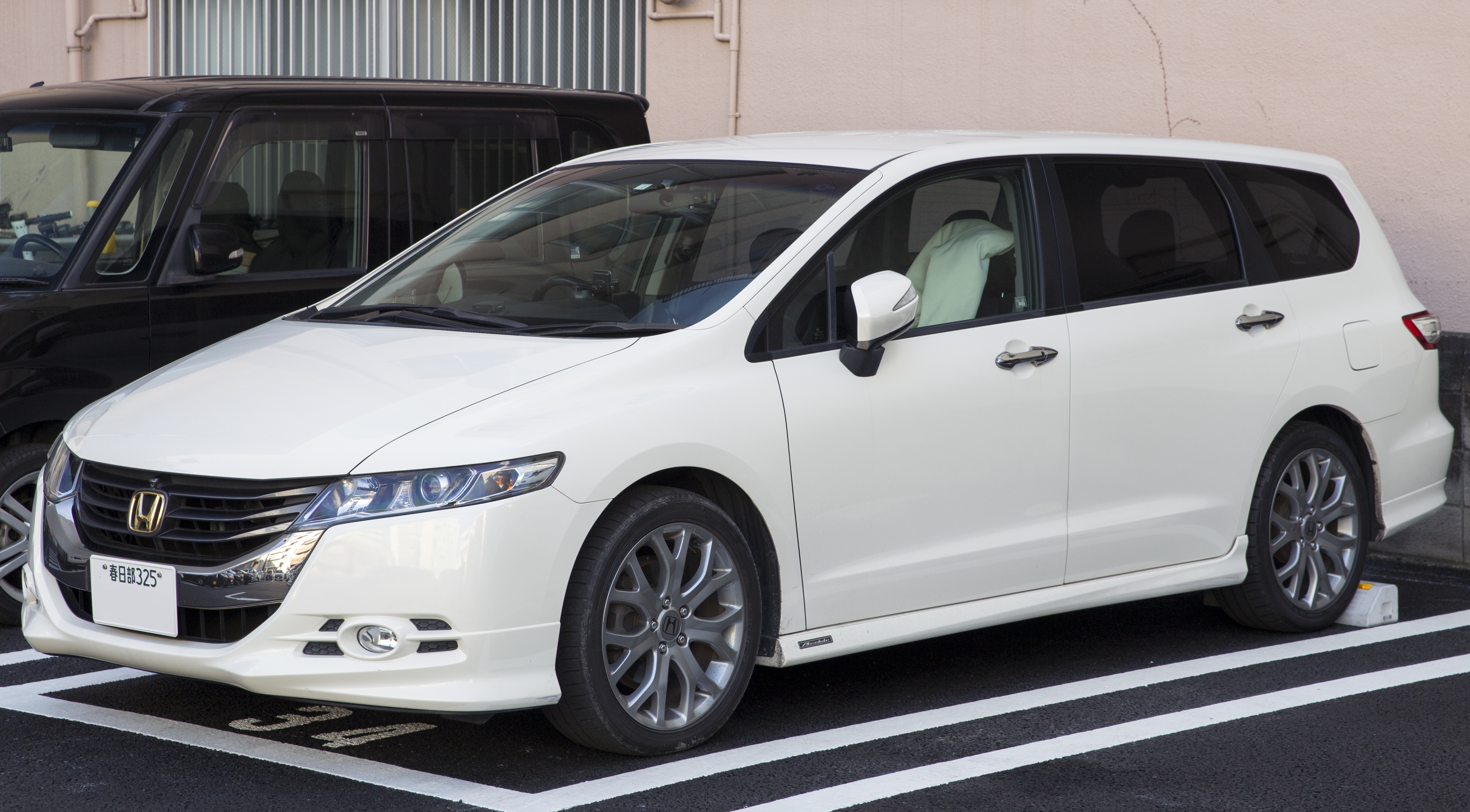
- Odyssey Absolute (pre-facelift, Japan)

Overview
- Model code: RB3; RB4
- Production: 2008–2013
- Assembly: Japan: Sayama; China: Guangzhou (Guangqi Honda)

Powertrain
- Engine: Petrol: 2.4 L K24A i-VTEC I4
- Transmission: 5-speed automatic CVT

Dimensions
- Wheelbase: 2,830 mm (111.4 in)
- Length: 4,780 mm (188.2 in)
- Width: 1,800 mm (70.9 in)
- Height: 1,545–1,565 mm (60.8–61.6 in)
- Curb weight: 1,600–1,690 kg (3,527–3,726 lb)

Sales of the fourth-generation Odyssey in the Japanese market began on 17 October 2008, and it was initially available in M, L, Li and Absolute grade levels. The engine and transmission has fundamentally remained the same as the third-generation, adding more power and better fuel economy. It is equipped with a 2.4-litre engine and CVT with a torque converter for the FWD, and 5-speed automatic transmission for 4WD and high-output 206 hp Absolute grade.

Two engines are offered in Japan: one with 173 PS output (i-VTEC is only for intake camshaft) and the other one with 204–206 PS output in Absolute grade (i-VTEC is for both camshafts). On 3 September 2009, the M Fine Spirit grade has been added, positioned below the M grade. At the same time, the Aero Package is also available for M Fine Spirit and M grades with the same bumper as the Absolute grade. The Odyssey received a facelift with a redesigned grille on 6 October 2011. The M Fine Spirit grade was replaced by the M-S grade, and the L grade was discontinued. On 5 July 2012, the MX grade was added and is also available with the Aero Package. The MX grade is positioned above the M grade and below the Li grade.

One of the biggest changes to this generation of Odyssey was the inclusion of electronic stability control and standard curtain airbags on all grades.

In many markets outside Japan such as Australia and Indonesia, the Odyssey is also equipped with a 5-speed automatic transmission.

In Australia, the Odyssey was the best-selling people mover among private buyers.

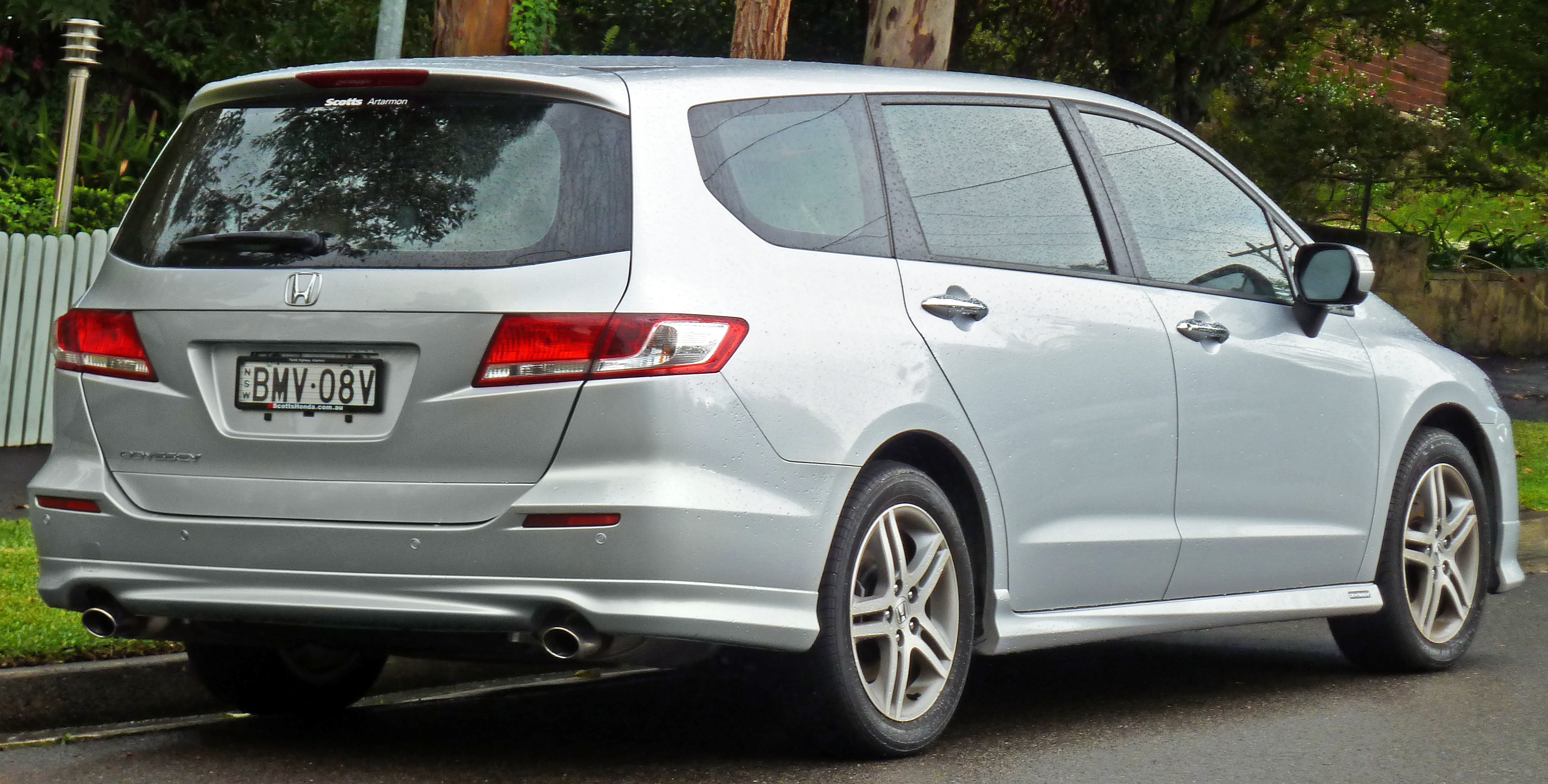
Odyssey Luxury (pre-facelift, Australia)

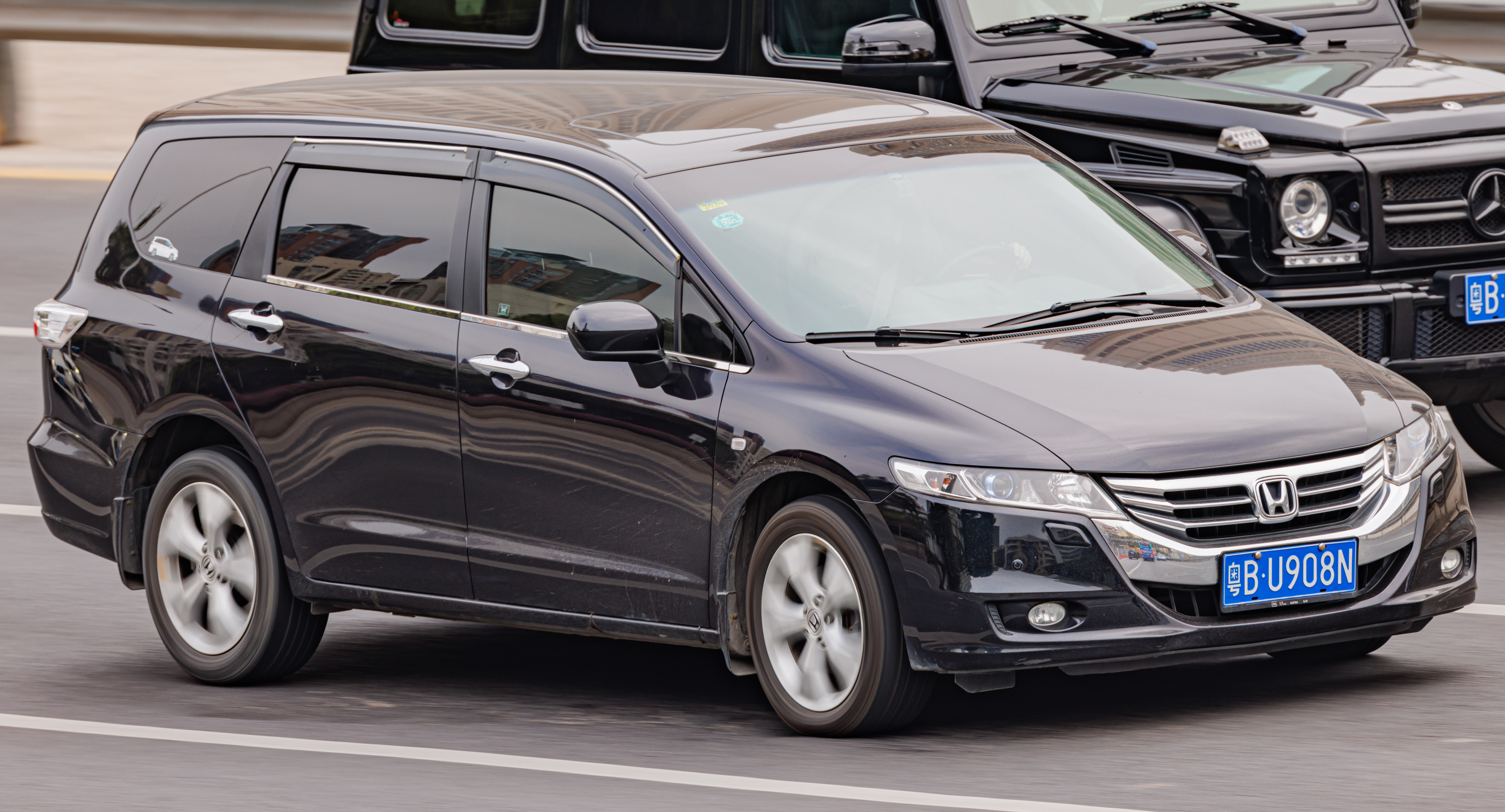
Odyssey (facelift, China)

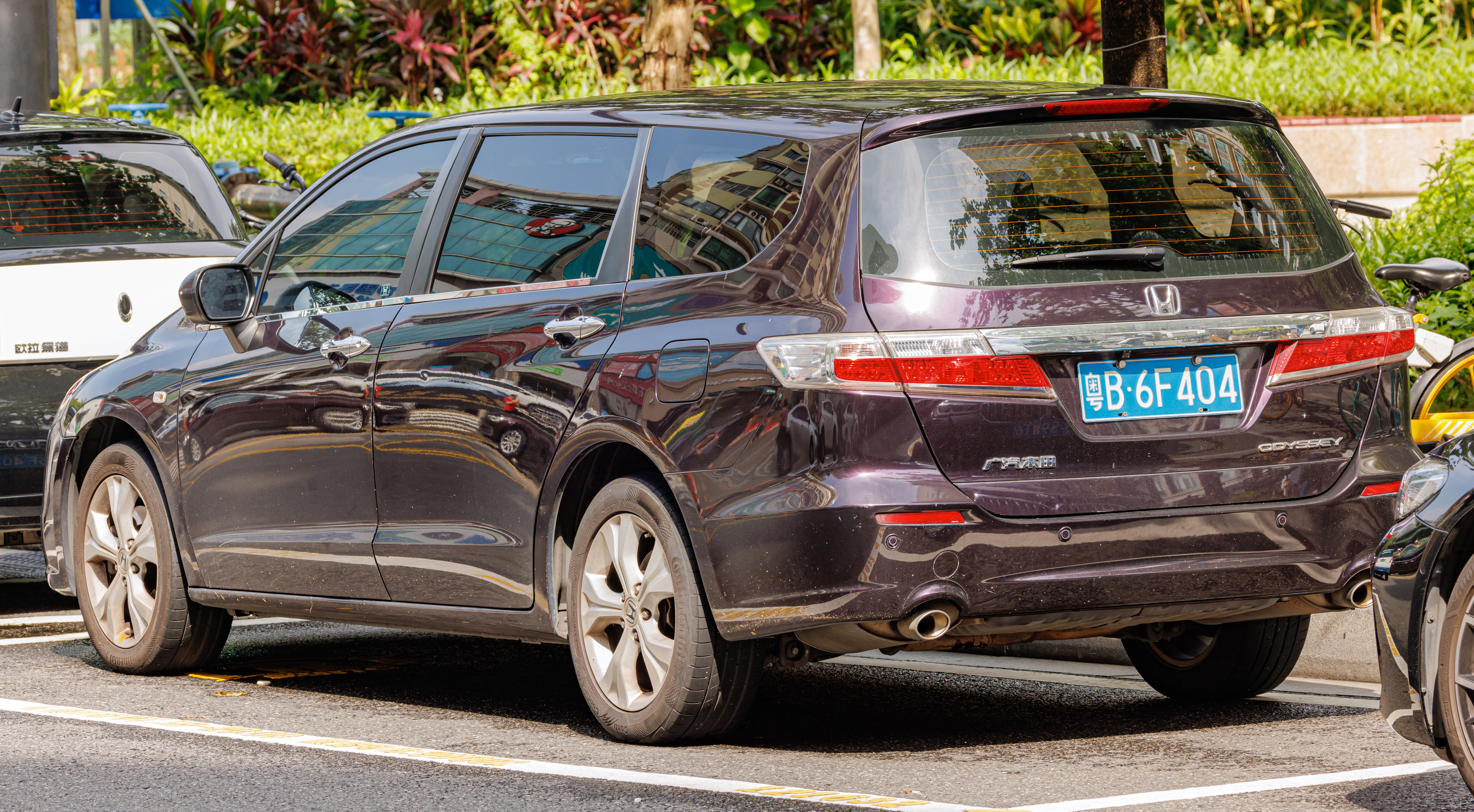
Odyssey (facelift, China)

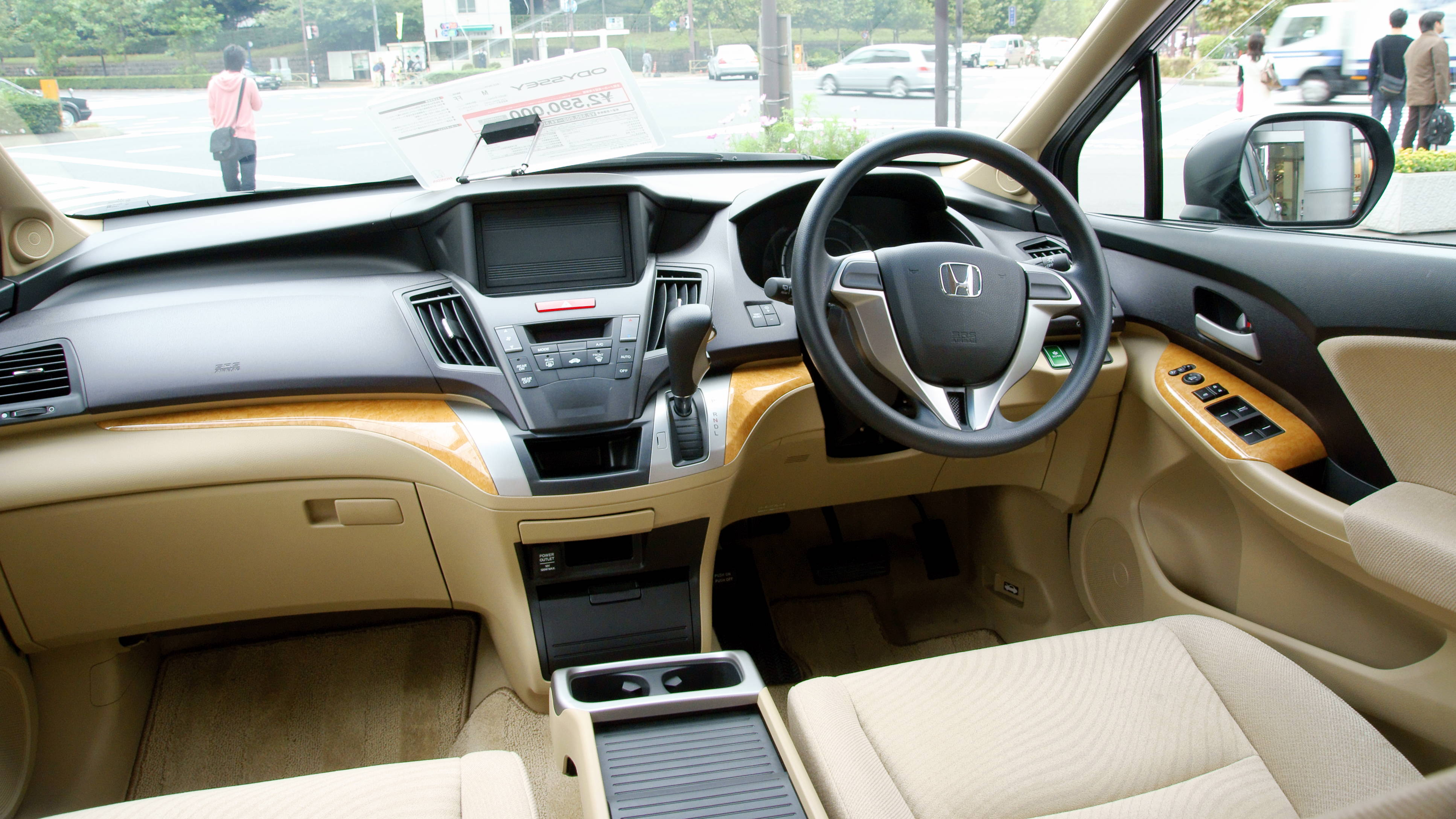
Interior (pre-facelift)

== Fifth generation (RC; 2013) ==
Fifth generation
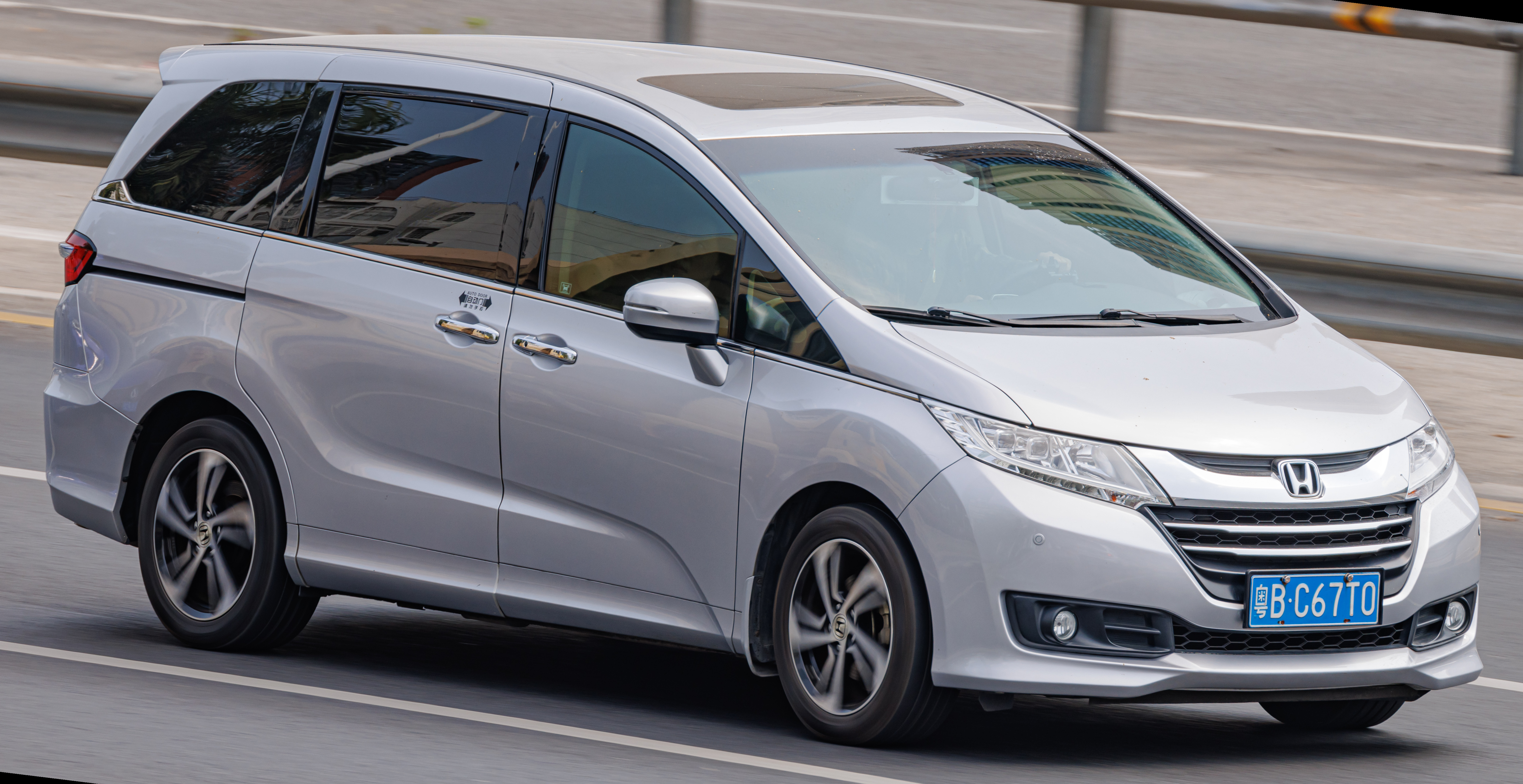
- Odyssey (pre-facelift, China)

Overview
- Model code: RC1; RC2; RC4
- Also called: Honda Elysion (second generation) (China)
- Production: 2013–2021, 2023–present (Japan); 2014–present (China)
- Assembly: Japan: Sayama (until 2021); China: Guangzhou (GAC Honda); Wuhan (Dongfeng Honda; Elysion)

Body and chassis
- Body style: 5-door minivan

Powertrain
- Engine: Petrol: 2.0 L LFA1/LFB1/LFA-H4 i-VTEC I4 (hybrid); 2.4 L K24W i-VTEC I4
- Electric motor: AC synchronous permanent magnet (hybrid)
- Transmission: CVT e-CVT (hybrid)

Dimensions
- Wheelbase: 2,900 mm (114.2 in)
- Length: 4,830–4,845 mm (190.2–190.7 in)
- Width: 1,820 mm (71.7 in)
- Height: 1,685–1,715 mm (66.3–67.5 in)
- Curb weight: 1,700–1,880 kg (3,748–4,145 lb)

The fifth-generation Odyssey for the international market was teased on the website on 26 September 2013, and went on sale in Japan on 1 November 2013. However, long before that, Honda showcased a concept car called the Concept M which was presented at the 2013 Shanghai Auto Show. The rear hinged side doors were changed to dual power sliding doors, much like most other minivans by Japanese automakers today. It is now bigger than its predecessors and for seven-seater variants, premium cradle seats with ottomans are offered on the second row. The new RC1 (2WD) & RC2 (4WD) models are available in either seven-seater or eight-seater. It is powered by Honda's newly developed 2.4-litre i-VTEC Earth Dreams engine which produces 175 PS (173 hp; 129 kW) and 225 N⋅m (23 kg⋅m; 166 lb⋅ft). Direct-injection is added in the range-topping Absolute grade which increases output to 190 PS (187 hp; 140 kW) and 237 N⋅m (24 kg⋅m; 175 lb⋅ft). The 2.4L Earth Dreams engine provides fuel economy of 14.0 km/L (40 mpg_{‑imp}; 33 mpg_{‑US}) as calculated from Japan's JC08 mode test cycle. Its suspensions were switched from four-wheel double wishbone used in the four previous generations to a MacPherson strut in the front and a torsion beam in the rear.

In Japan, this model also replaced the first-generation Elysion to compete against Toyota Alphard and Nissan Elgrand in the full-size luxury MPV category.

The Odyssey Hybrid was launched in Japan on 4 February 2016 with a 2.0-litre petrol hybrid engine. Honda has given the Sport Hybrid i-MMD name to the new hybrid system. Improvements to the new hybrid system include reduction of the size and weight of key components such as the battery and power control unit from the existing two-motor hybrid system used in the Accord Hybrid and Accord Plug-in Hybrid that were introduced in 2013. The power control unit is 23 percent smaller and 27 percent lighter than the one in the Accord Hybrid.

In Australia, the Odyssey went on sale in February 2014 and is available in two trim levels: VTi, which is based on the JDM G grade, and VTi-L, which is based on the JDM Absolute grade. It became the best selling model of the segment in 2014 with sales of 2,552, had 26.6 percent of the market. In the following year, sales reached 2,836.

In the Middle East, the JDM Odyssey was introduced in 2015 as Honda Odyssey J, while USDM Odyssey continues with its original name.

The fifth-generation Odyssey is sold in China by Guangqi Honda since July 2014. The Absolute grade followed later in July 2015. The fifth-generation Odyssey is also a basis for the second-generation Elysion for the Chinese market, but with a different front fascia, and adopts a design resembling the Honda Legend. The Odyssey-based Elysion was launched in China on 9 January 2016, and it is sold by Dongfeng Honda.

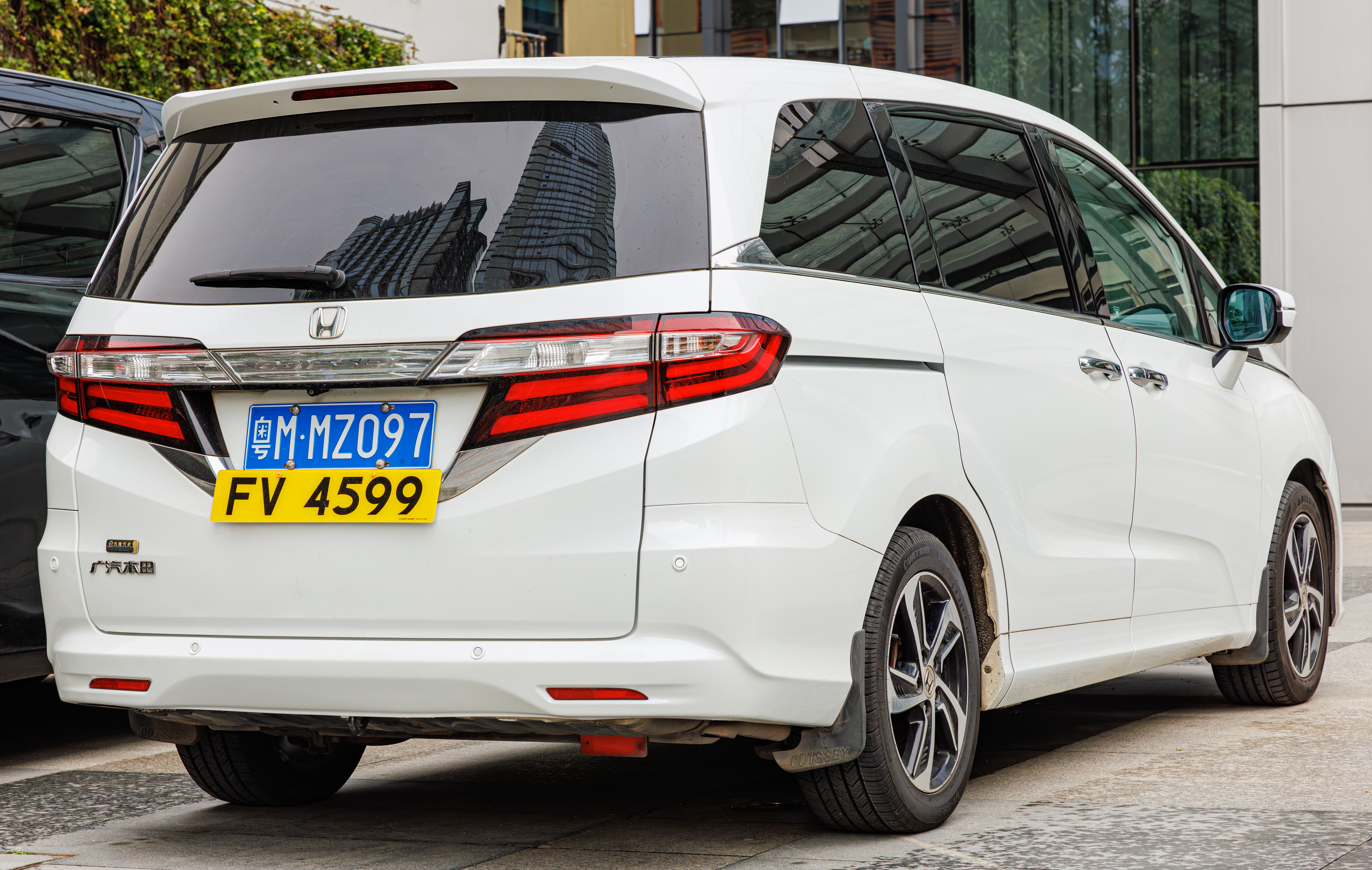
Odyssey (pre-facelift, China)

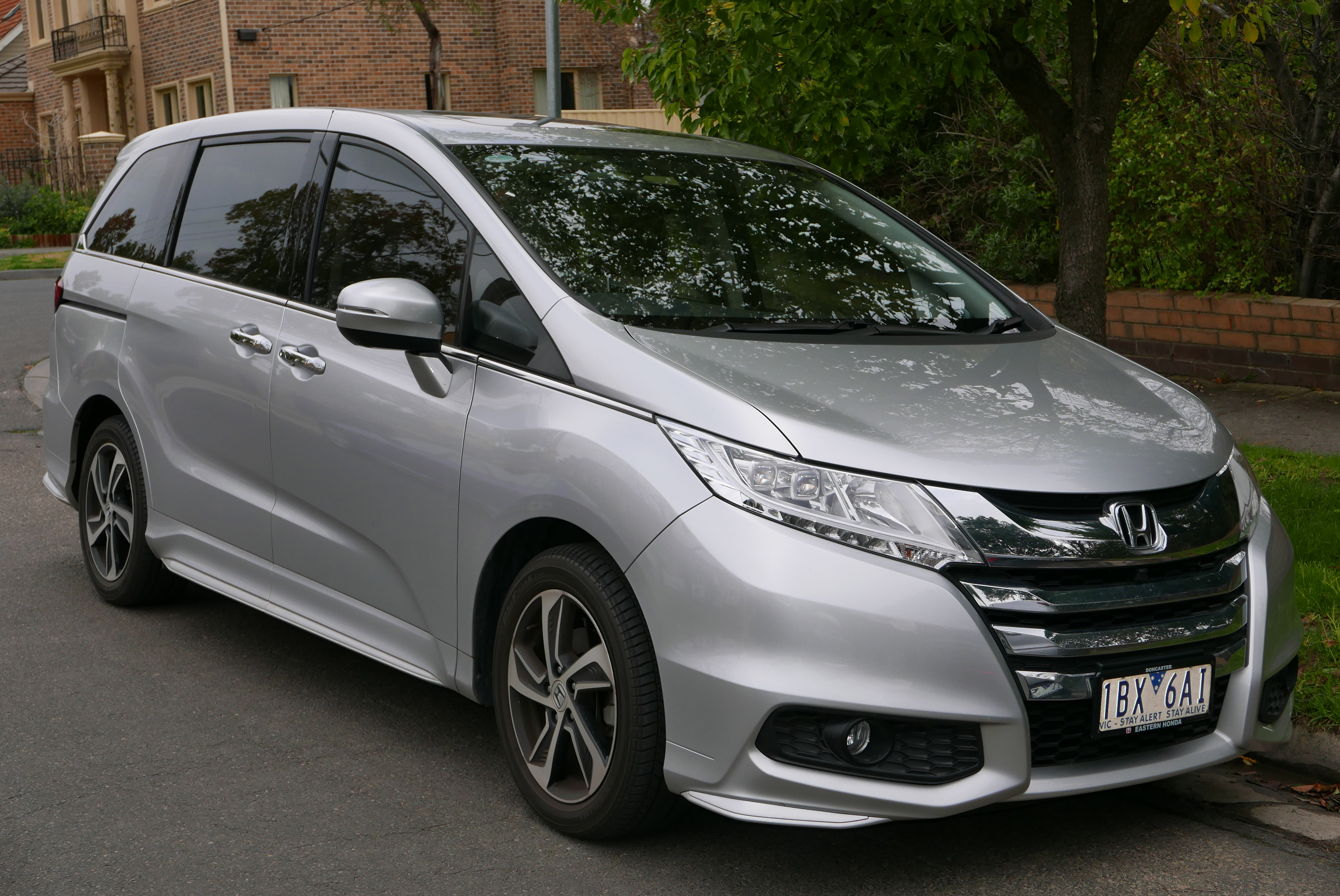
Odyssey VTi-L (pre-facelift, Australia) based on the Absolute grade

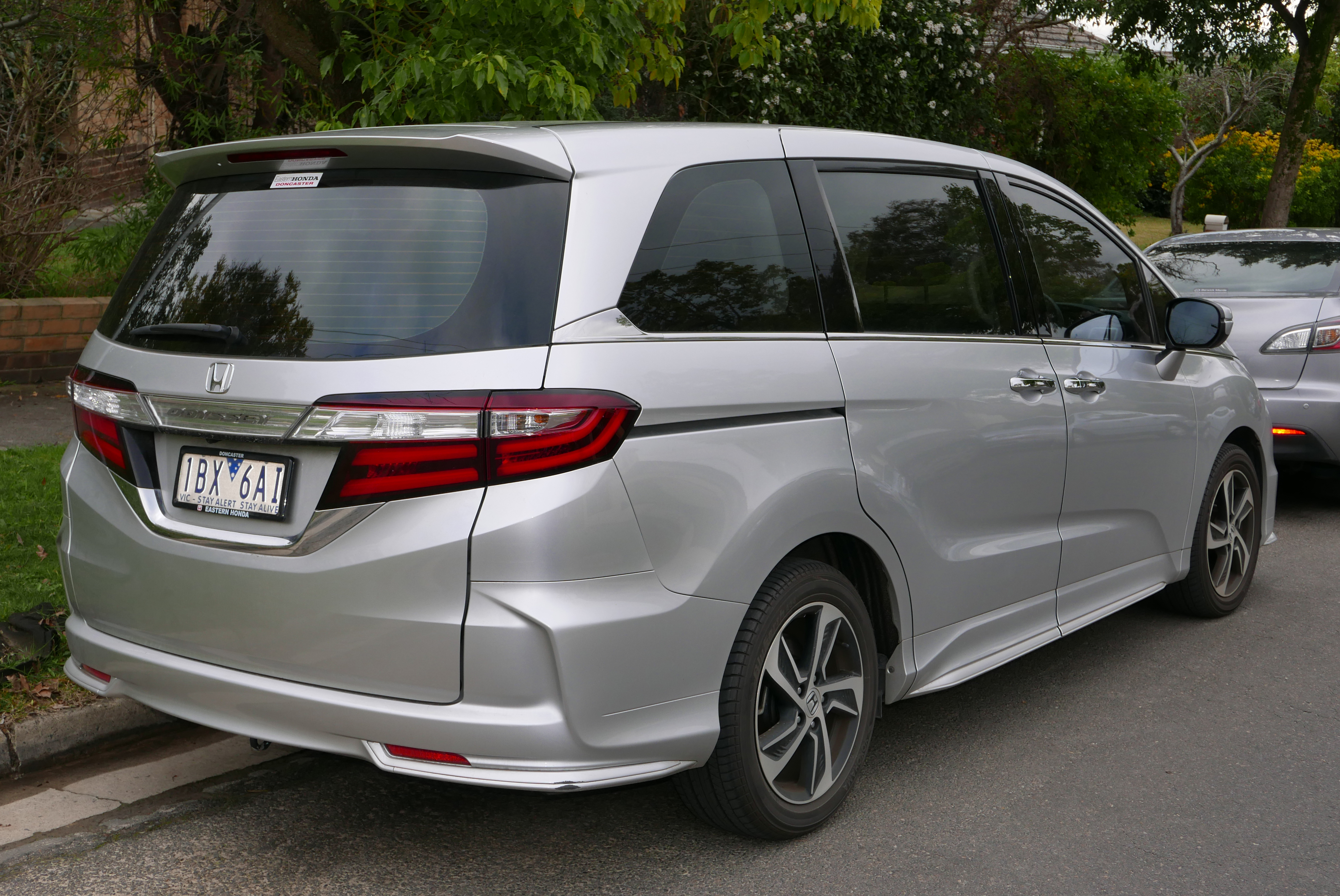
Odyssey VTi-L (pre-facelift, Australia)

=== 2017 facelift ===
On 16 November 2017, the fifth-generation Odyssey was given a facelift with new bumpers and LED fog lamps and was refreshed with a range of driver's assistances featuring adaptive cruise control, forward collision warning, collision mitigation braking system, lane departure warning, road departure mitigation system, lane-keeping assist system, rear-cross traffic monitor and blind-spot monitoring system in the top of the range model. It also has a new chrome front grille fascia, an improved NVH (noise, vibration, harshness) and a plusher captain's chair in the second row.

The first facelift of the fifth-generation Odyssey was introduced in the Chinese market in July 2018, updating the front end with a redesigned front bumper. The Odyssey Sport Hybrid based on the Japanese market Absolute grade was launched in China on 29 April 2019.

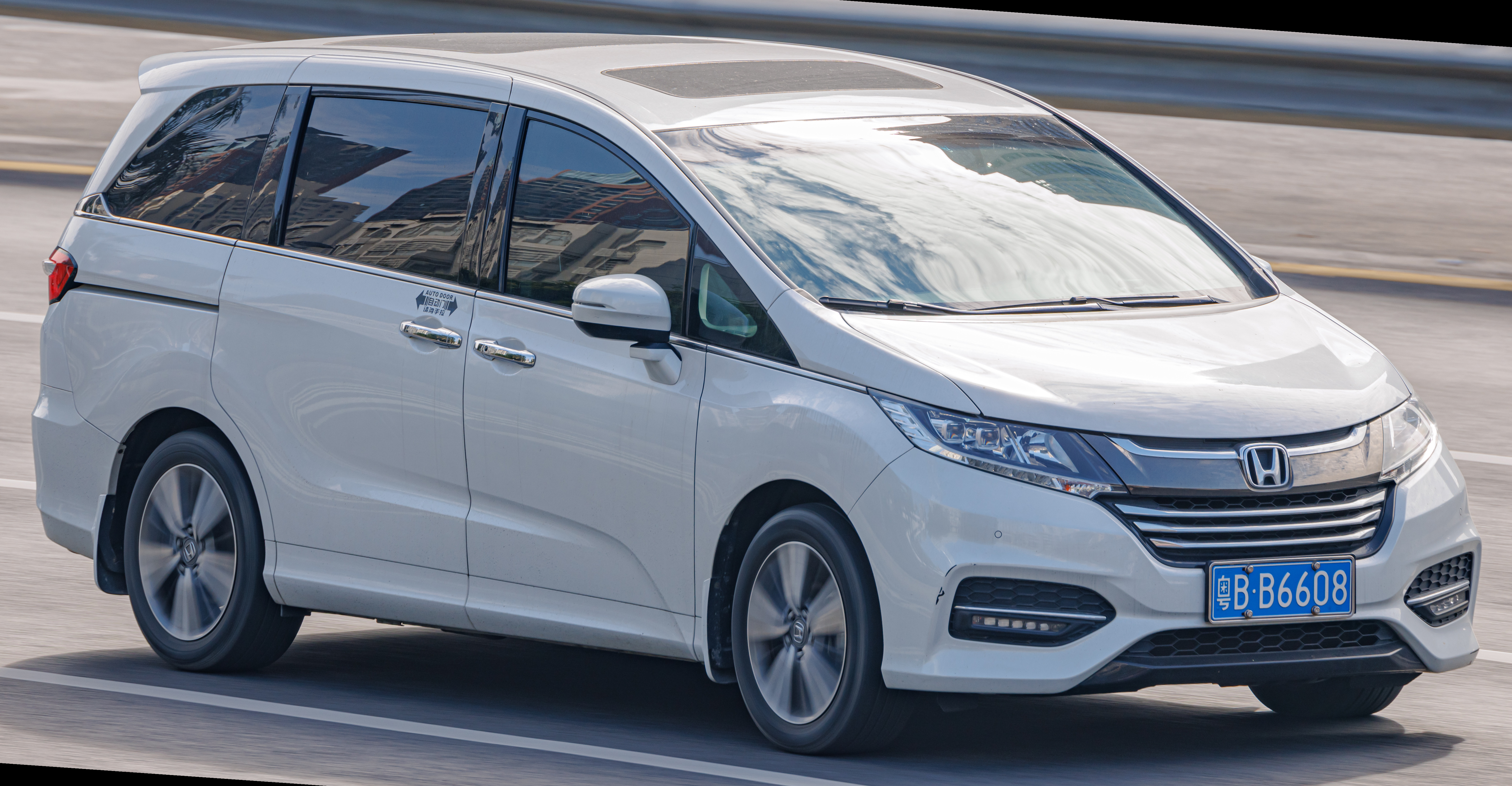
Odyssey (2017 facelift, China)

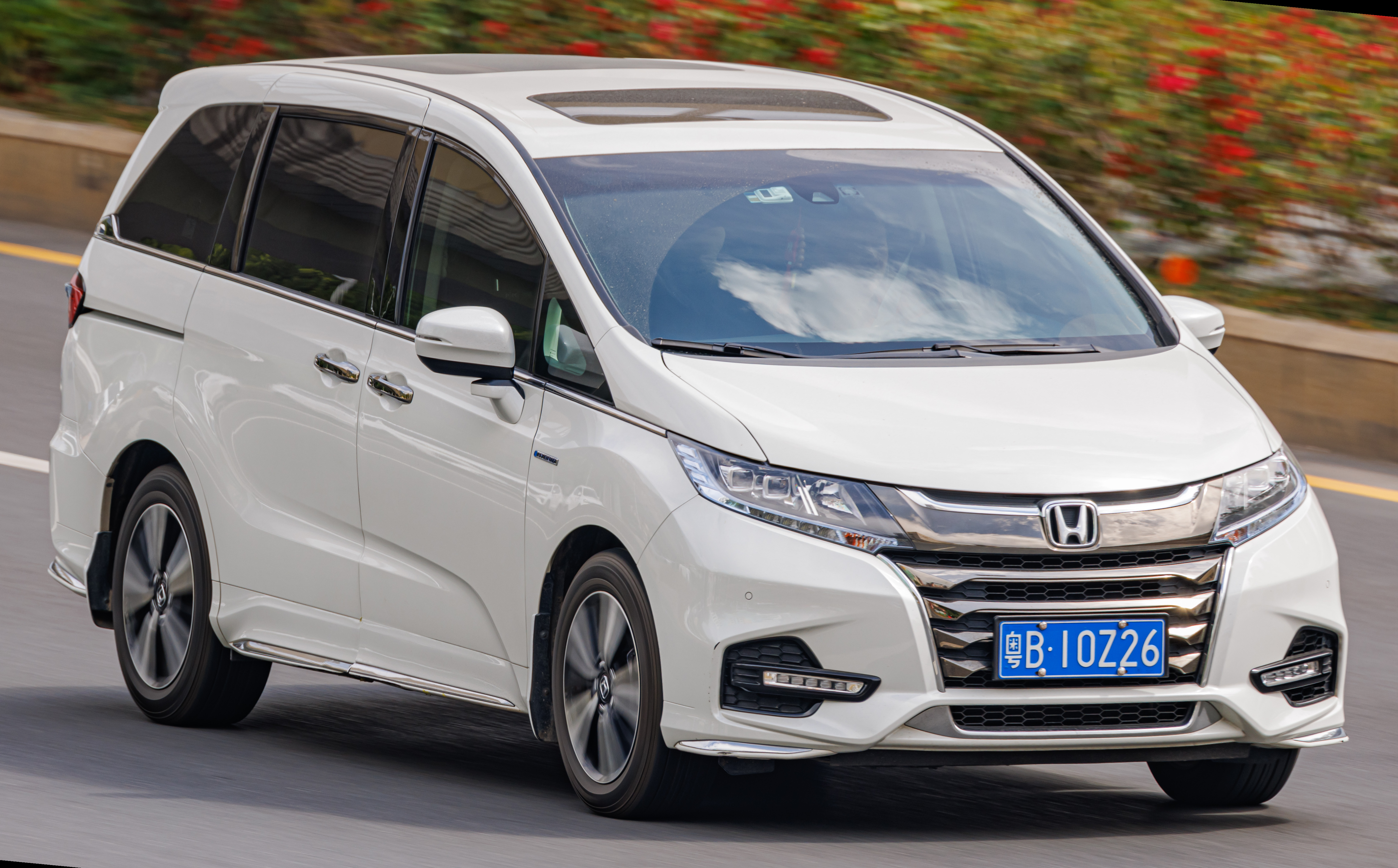
Odyssey Sport Hybrid (2017 facelift, China) based on the Absolute grade

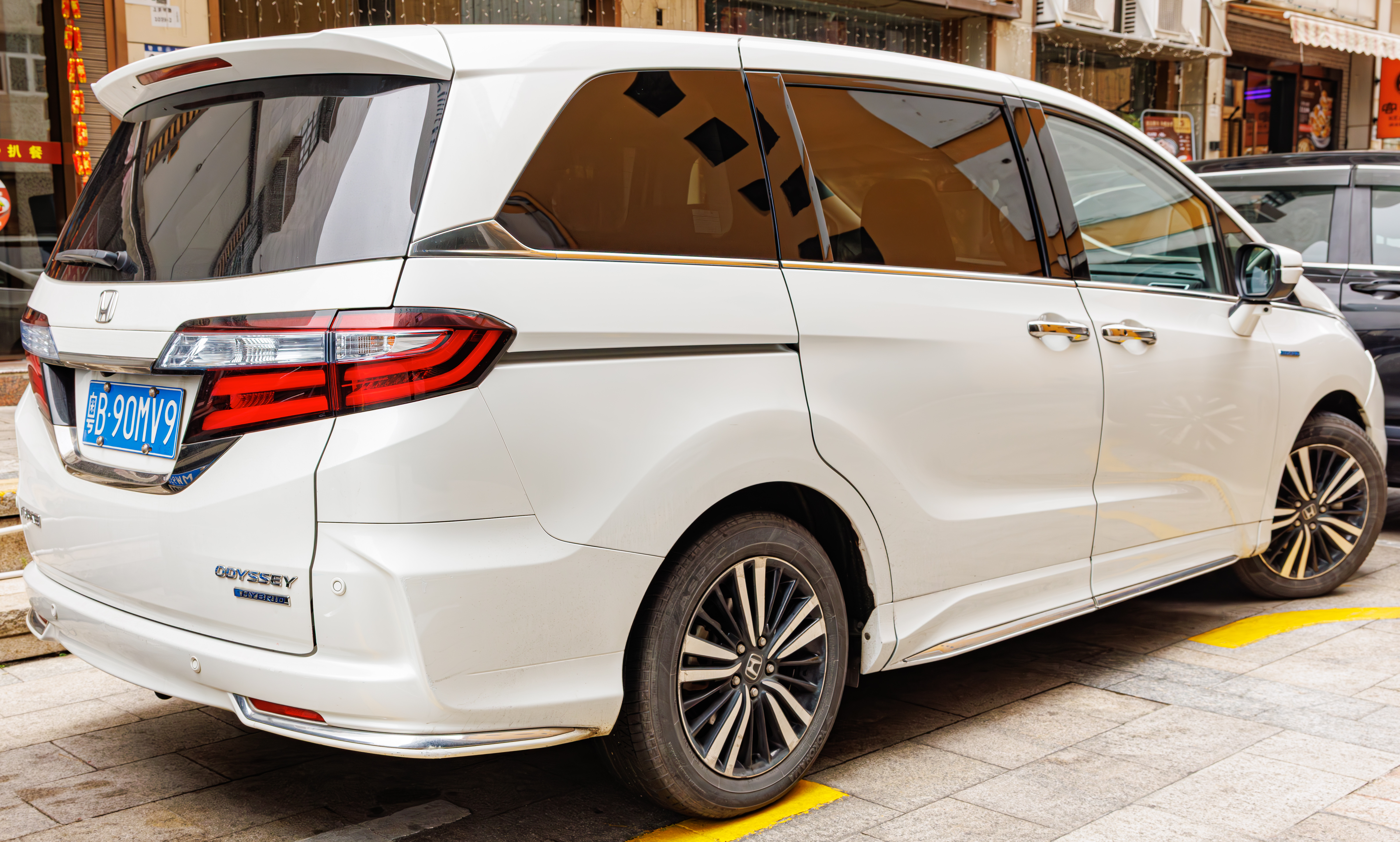
Odyssey Sport Hybrid (2017 facelift, China) based on the Absolute grade

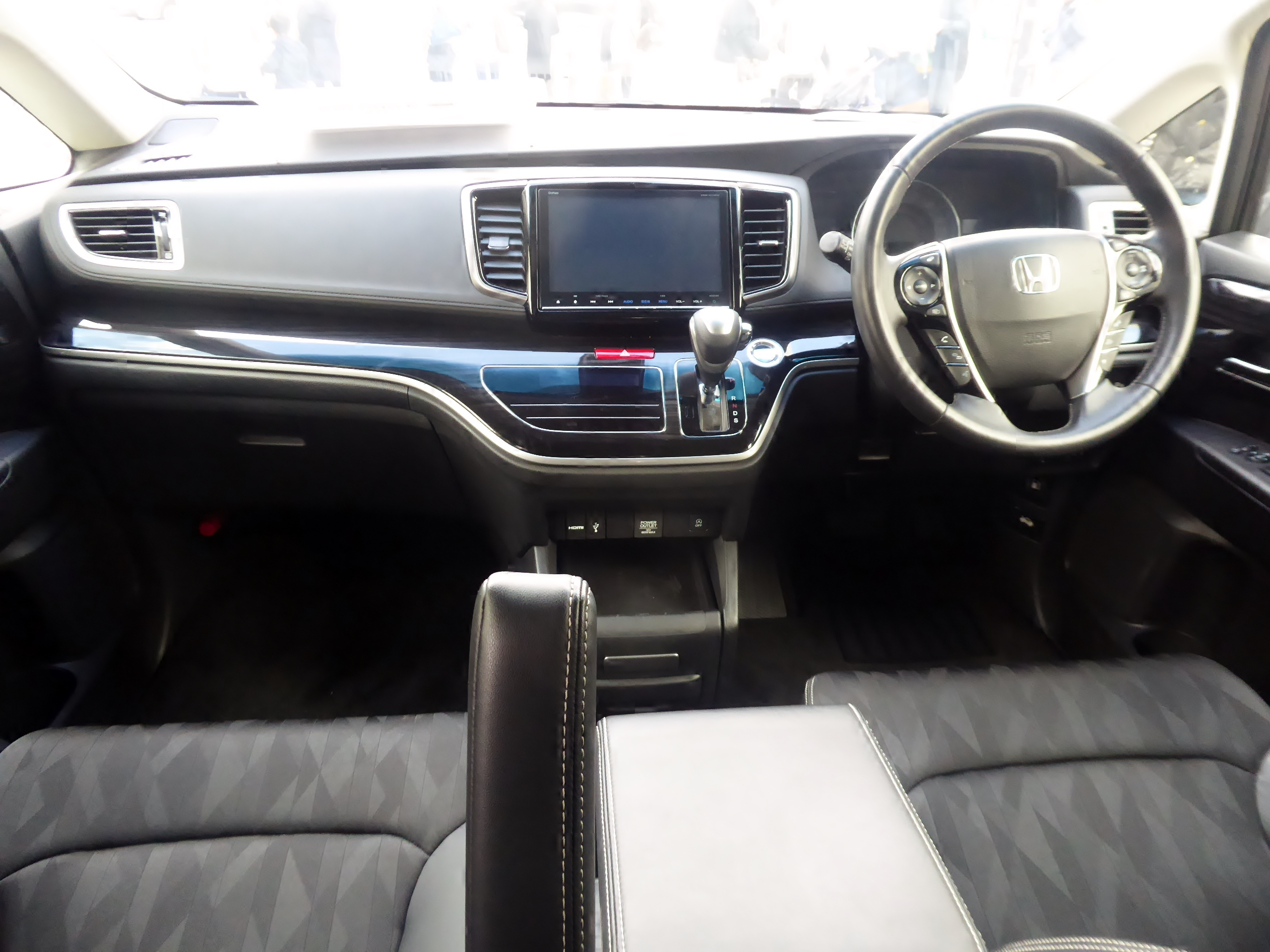
Interior (2017 facelift)

=== 2020 facelift ===
The second facelift model went on sale in Japan in November 2020, featuring redesigned bumpers with a two-piece grille, headlamps and tail lamps with a thin chrome bar across them. In the interior, it receives a redesigned dashboard with a 7.0-inch info display replacing the previous 3.5-inch found on the instrument cluster, and motion detection sliding doors using hand gestures. The second facelift model was also launched in China in November 2021 at the Guangzhou Motor Show, available as an hybrid only.

Production of the Odyssey ended in Japan in December 2021 due to the closure of Honda's Sayama plant, with remaining inventory sold out by September 2022.

In April 2023, Honda reintroduced the Odyssey in Japan as a hybrid variant only, to be imported from China, where it is built at Guangqi Honda's manufacturing plant in Guangzhou. Exports from China commenced on 23 September 2023.

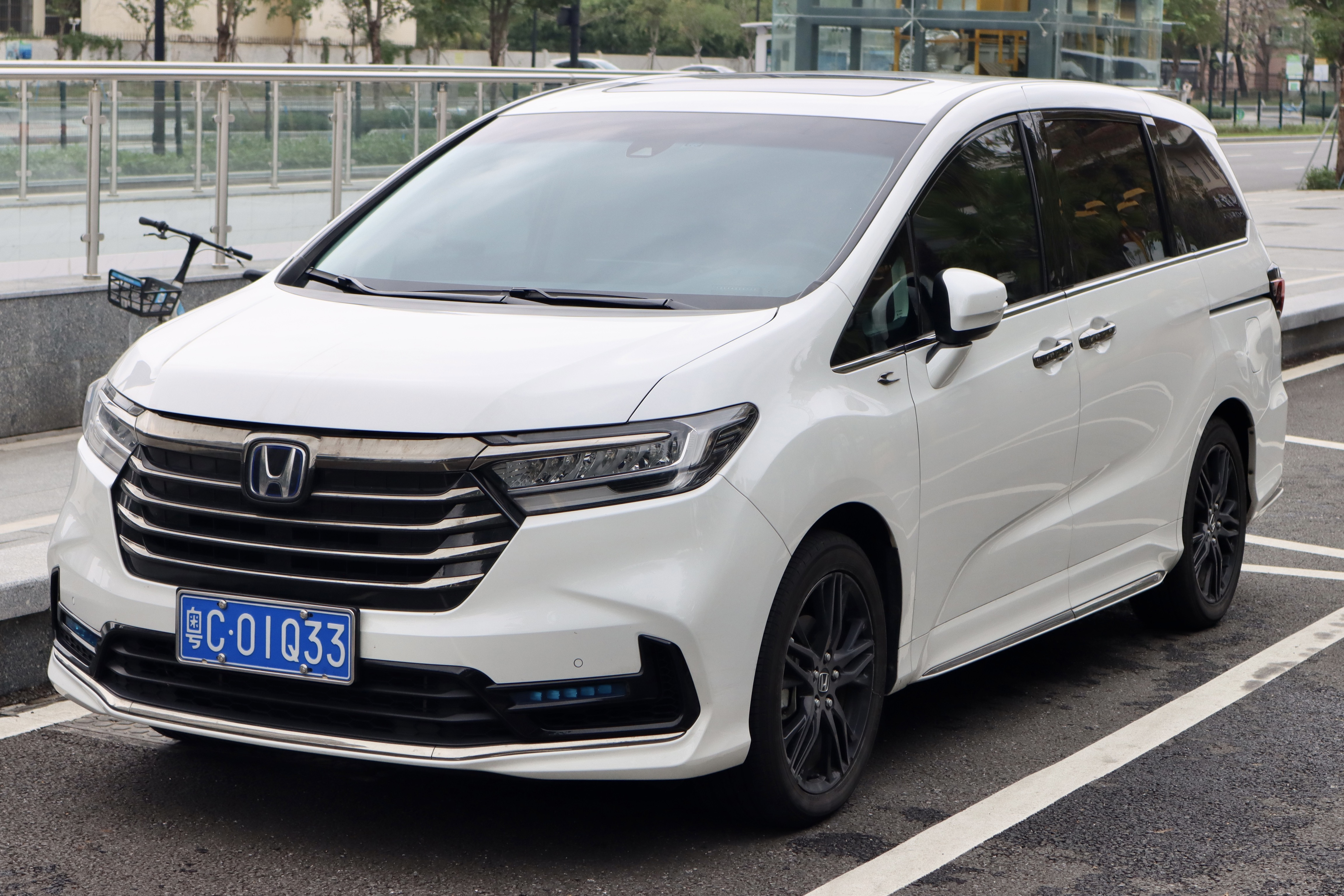
Odyssey e:HEV (2020 facelift, China)

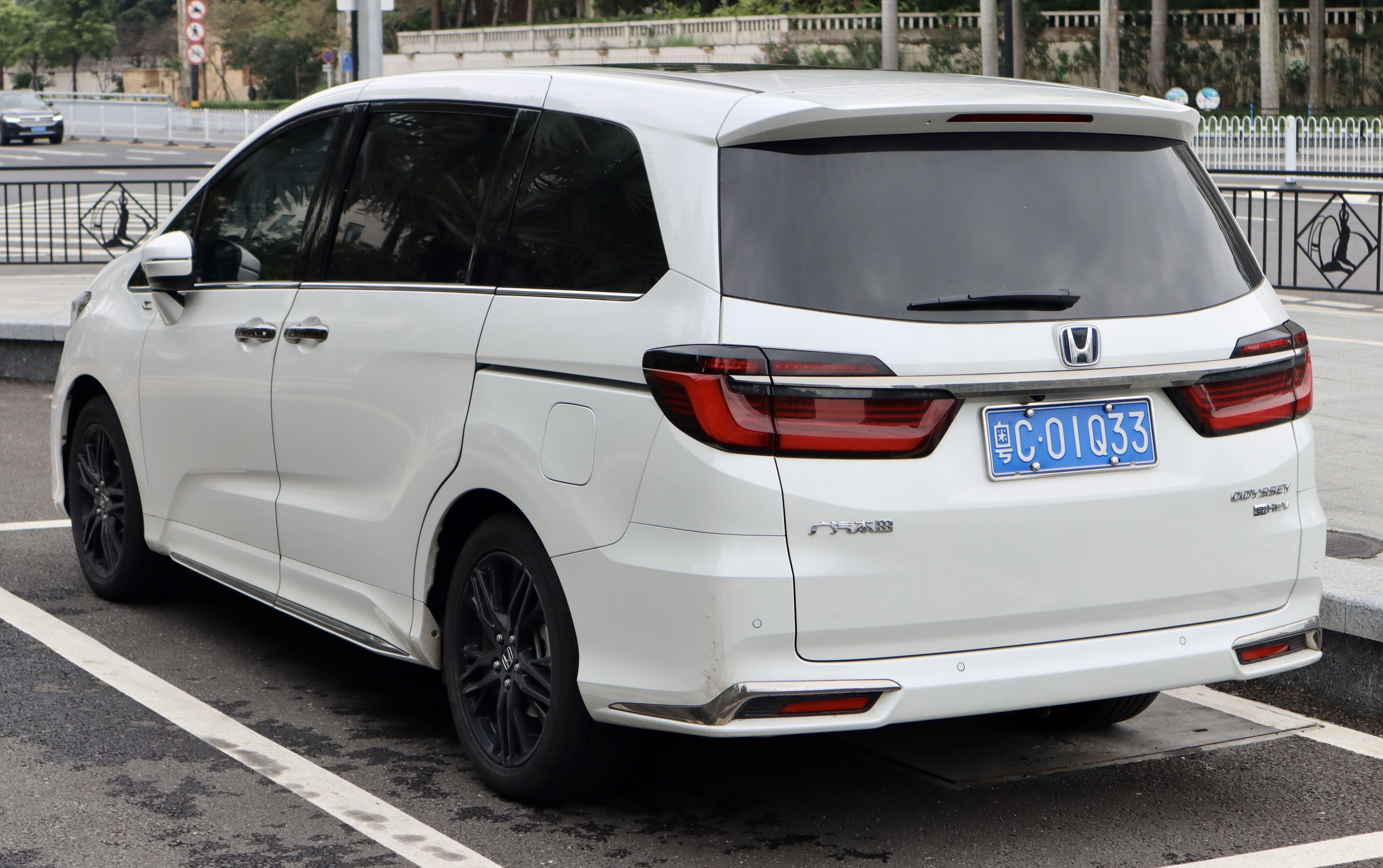
Odyssey e:HEV (2020 facelift, China)

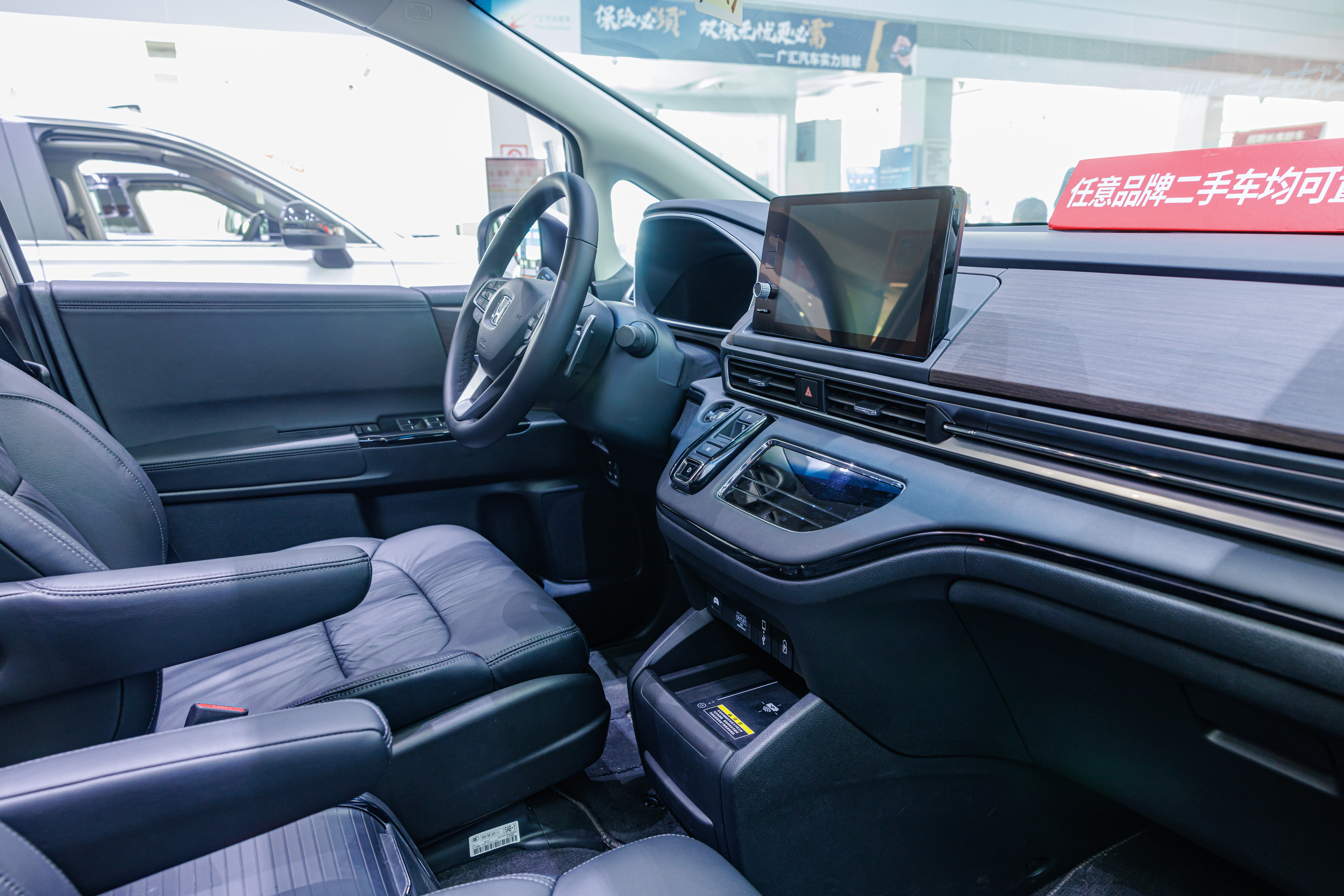
Interior (2020 facelift)

=== Safety ===
ANCAP test results* Honda Odyssey (2014)
Test	Score
Overall	5 /5 stars
Frontal offset	12.75/16
Side impact	16/16
Pole	2/2
Seat belt reminders	2/3
Whiplash protection	Good
Pedestrian protection	Adequate
Electronic stability control	Standard

ANCAP test results* Honda Odyssey all MY21 variants (2014)
Test	Score
Overall	5 /5 stars
Frontal offset	12.75/16
Side impact	16/16
Pole	2/2
Seat belt reminders	2/3
Whiplash protection	Good
Pedestrian protection	Adequate
Electronic stability control	Standard

== Reception ==
At its debut, the Odyssey won the Japan Car of the Year Award (Special Category) and the RJC New Car of the Year Award. By September 1997, the Odyssey had sold more than 300,000 units, becoming Honda’s fastest-selling new car and breaking the Civic’s record. The Odyssey was Wheels magazine's Car of the Year for 1995. At the Odyssey's European launch, where it was marketed as the Shuttle, British ex-Grand Prix driver Jonathan Palmer described its handling as equal of any "executive saloon".

== Sales ==
Year	Japan	China		Indonesia
Year	Japan	Odyssey	Elysion	Indonesia
1995	125,560			
1996	110,274			
1997	82,350			
1998	58,667			
1999	48,211			
2000	120,391			
2001	71,011			
2002	52,366			
2003	45,374			
2004	97,849			
2005	64,003	27,545		523
2006	44,986	35,777		0
2007	31,791	45,827		74
2008	28,982	28,873		244
2009	23,027	28,386		2
2010	16,801	45,810		443
2011	10,289	30,404		171
2012	7,898	20,900		676
2013	14,825	27,278		159
2014	32,749	34,839		642
2015	15,834	45,228		387
2016	30,866	40,029		239
2017	20,830	35,318		282
2018	16,670	45,498		262
2019	14,614	44,481		229
2020	9,717	6,309		112
2021	21,148			185
2022	5,212	41,282		5
2023	1,789	36,673	29,959	
2024	12,006	30,732	18,581	
2025	8,025	19,615	7,999	
