= Nissan Maxima =

Car model by Nissan from 1980 to 2023

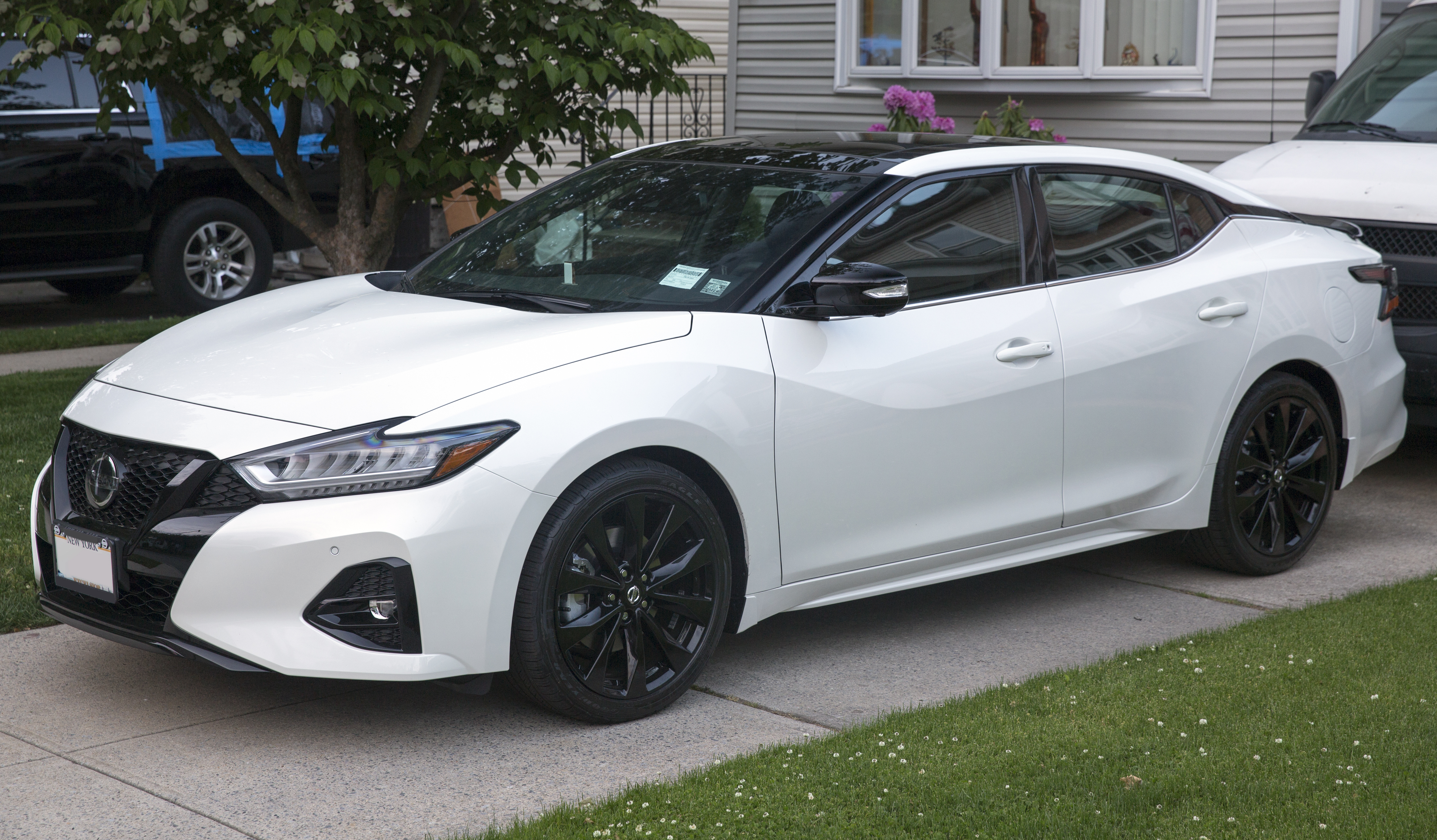
- 2021 Nissan Maxima SR (A36; US)

Overview
- Manufacturer: Nissan
- Also called: Datsun Maxima (1981–1984)
- Production: 1980–2023
- Model years: 1981–2023

Body and chassis
- Class: Mid-size (1981–2003); Full-size (2004–2023)
- Layout: Front-engine, rear-wheel-drive (1981–1984); Front-engine, front-wheel-drive (1985–2023)

Chronology
- Predecessor: Datsun 810

The Nissan Maxima is a five-passenger, front-engine, full-size car that was manufactured and marketed by Nissan as Nissan's flagship sedan primarily in North America, the Middle East, South Korea, and China — across eight generations. The Maxima debuted for model year 1982 as the Datsun Maxima, replacing the Datsun 810.

The Maxima was marketed as an upscale alternative to the Altima and prior to 1993, the Stanza, distinguished by features such as a premium interior and V6 engine. Most Maximas were built in Oppama, Japan, until North American assembly began in Smyrna, Tennessee, for the 2004 model year.

For the US and Canada, Nissan ended production of the Maxima in July 2023.

Outside North America, the Maxima nameplate has also been applied to variants or trim levels of several other models.

== First generation (1981) ==
Nissan Maxima
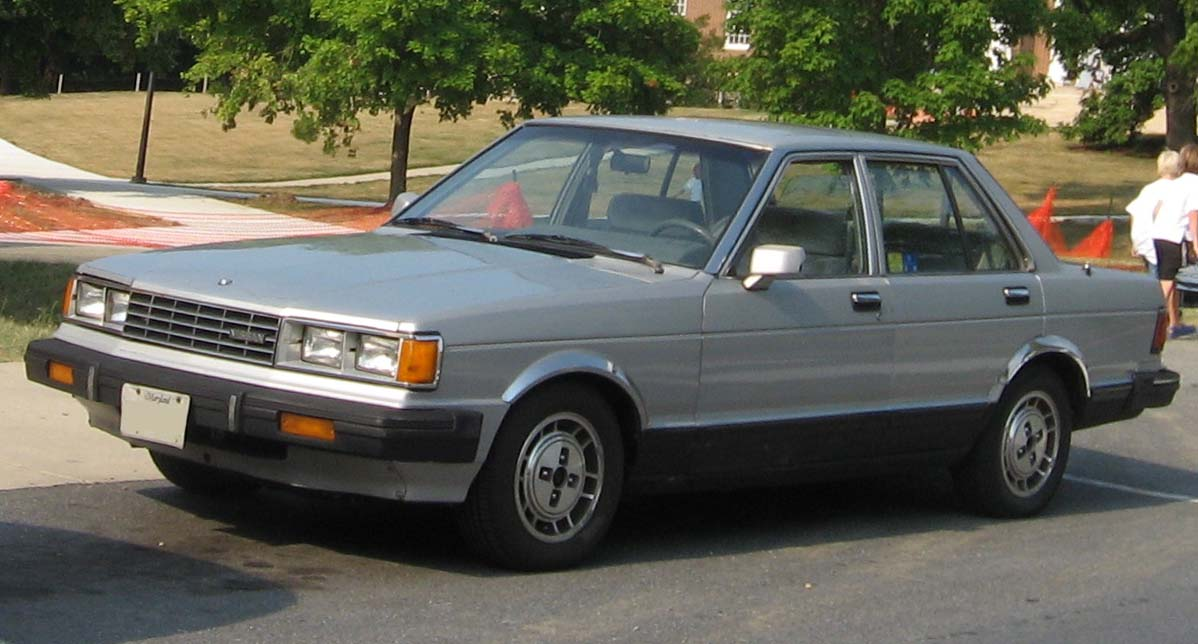
- 1984 Nissan Maxima

Overview
- Model code: 910 G910
- Also called: Datsun 810; Datsun Maxima
- Production: 1980–1981 (Datsun 810); 1981–1983 (Datsun Maxima); 1983–1984 (Nissan Maxima)
- Model years: 1981–1984
- Assembly: Japan: Oppama Plant, Yokosuka, Kanagawa

Body and chassis
- Body style: 4-door sedan; 5-door station wagon
- Layout: Front-engine, rear-wheel-drive
- Related: Datsun Bluebird (910)

Powertrain
- Engine: Gasoline: 2.4 L L24E I6; Diesel: 2.8 L LD28 I6
- Transmission: 5-speed manual; 3-speed 3N71 automatic (1980–1982); 4-speed L4N71B automatic (1983–1984)

Dimensions
- Wheelbase: 2,625 mm (103.3 in)

The first car to wear the Maxima badge was the second generation Datsun 810, introduced only in the North American market in 1980 as a 1981 model. It was essentially a Japanese market Datsun Bluebird (910) with the wheelbase extended 3.9 in (100 mm) to accommodate the inline six-cylinder engine. It was sold in two trim levels, either the lower trimmed "810 Deluxe" or the upper trimmed "810 Maxima". The body options available included either a 4-door sedan or a 5-door station wagon with both trim levels available on both bodies. In 1981 for the 1982 model year, all 810s were rebranded as Datsun Maxima. In 1983 for the 1984 model year, the last year of the first generation Maxima, North American Datsuns began carrying both a "Datsun" badge plus a separate "Nissan" badge, additionally some 1984 model year Maximas carried only a "Datsun" badge which featured "by Nissan" in sub script.

For the first model year, the 810 Deluxe came with a five-speed manual transmission, while the upper trim 810 Maxima only came with a three-speed automatic. The Maxima's introduction to North America followed the successful introduction of the Datsun 240Z, and used the same engine and transmission while offering luxury content four doors. The sedans have independent rear suspension while the wagon has a leaf sprung live rear axle. The wagon also received rear drums rather than disc brakes.

The second generation retained the same 2.4-liter base engine as the previous Datsun 810, although up by 2 to 120 hp (89 kW) and with more torque available at a lower engine speed. It was also available with the 2.8-liter LD28 OHC inline-six diesel engine (available in the US from mid-1981 through 1983) with either a five-speed manual or a four-speed automatic transmission with overdrive.

Some of the power steering pumps were sourced from General Motors' Saginaw Gear division, while others were sourced from Atsugi. This was the second Nissan to use US-sourced parts besides the Borg-Warner T-5 transmission used in the 82–86 Nissan ZX Turbos. The use of USA-made parts was phased in prior to the passage of local content laws imposed by the U.S. Government.

The Maxima featured a phonograph-based vehicle alert system called the "voice warning system". It featured a pre-recorded female voice speaking vehicle alerts in conjunction with the corresponding traditional dashboard warning light. Some of the available pre-recorded alerts included: "key is in the ignition" Warnings an open door, etc. would be relayed through the miniaturized phonograph and played audibly: "door is open, key is in ignition, etc." 1981 models were the first 'talking car' marketed in the US and offered only one voice warning, a female voice reminding the driver to "Please turn off the lights".

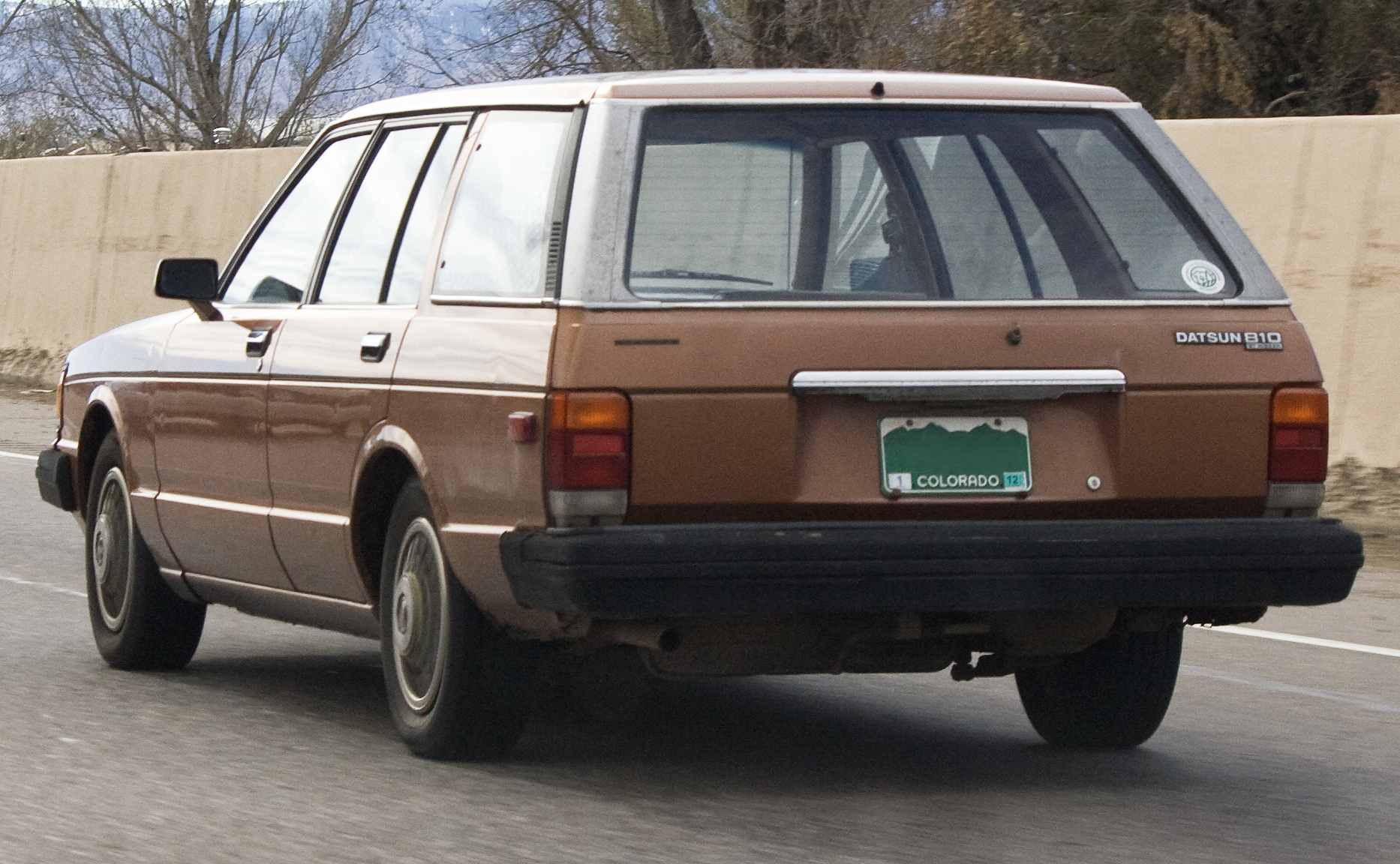
1981 Datsun 810 wagon

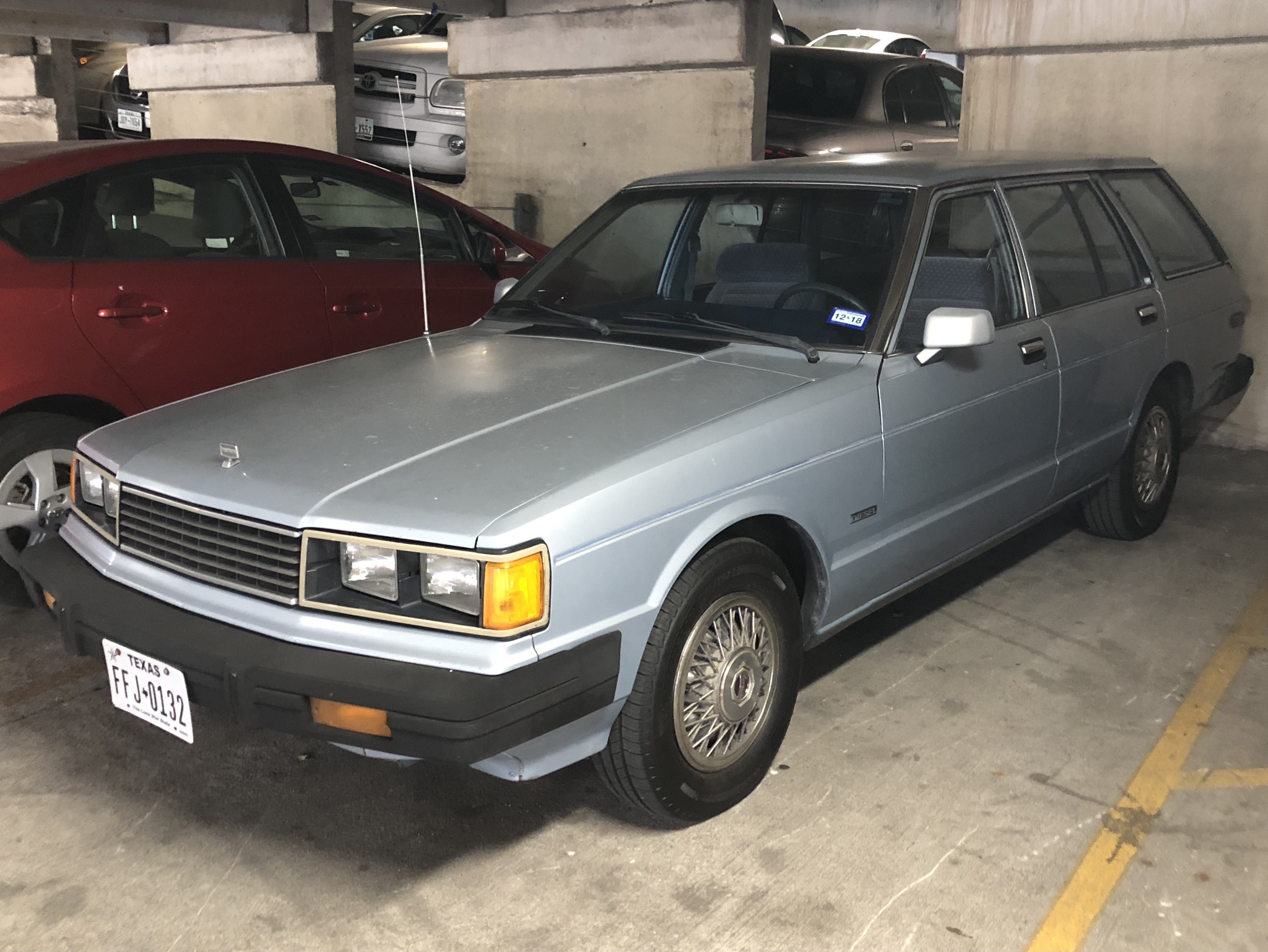
Datsun Maxima Wagon Diesel

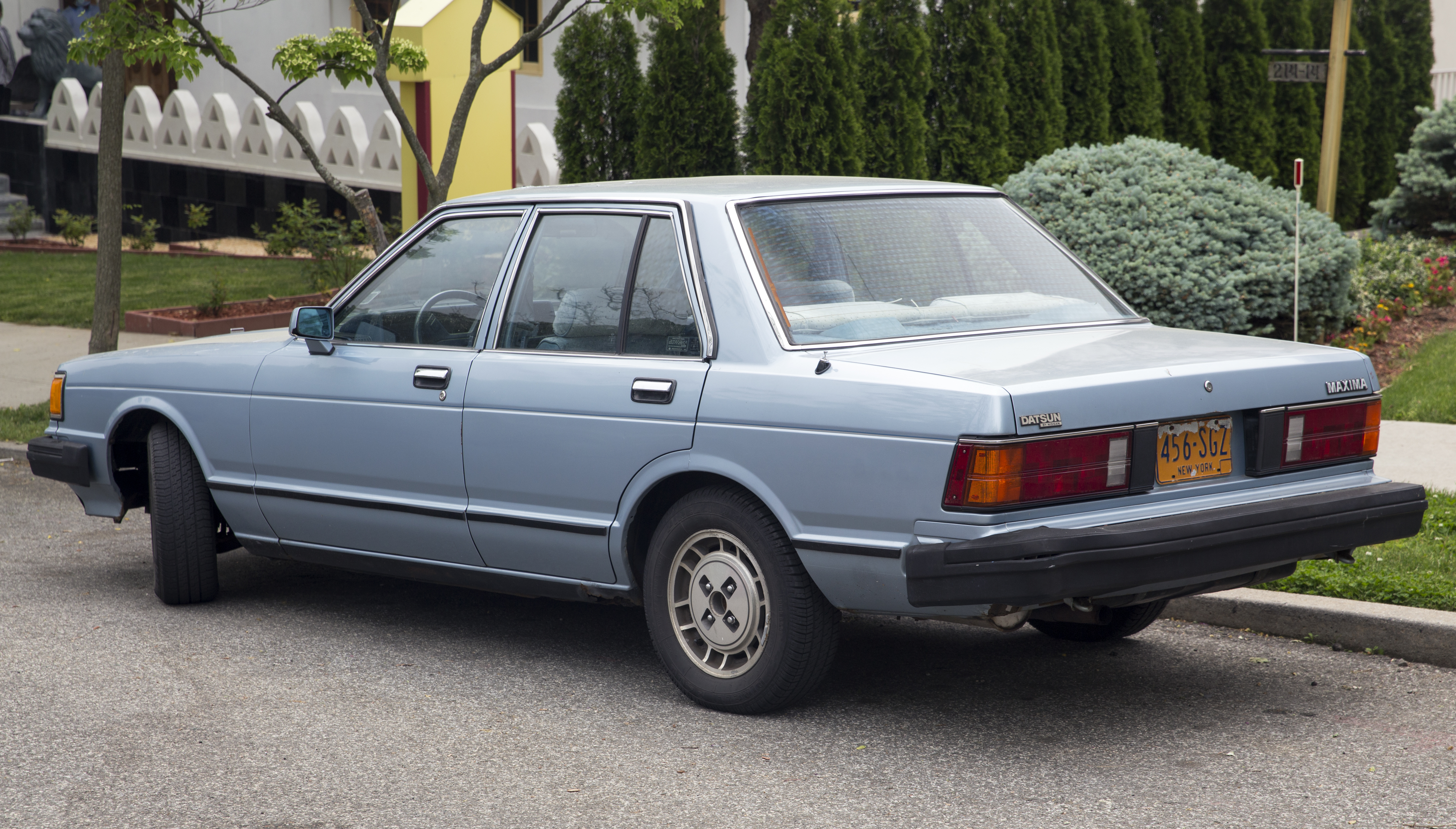
1982 Datsun Maxima sedan

== Second generation (1985) ==
Nissan Maxima
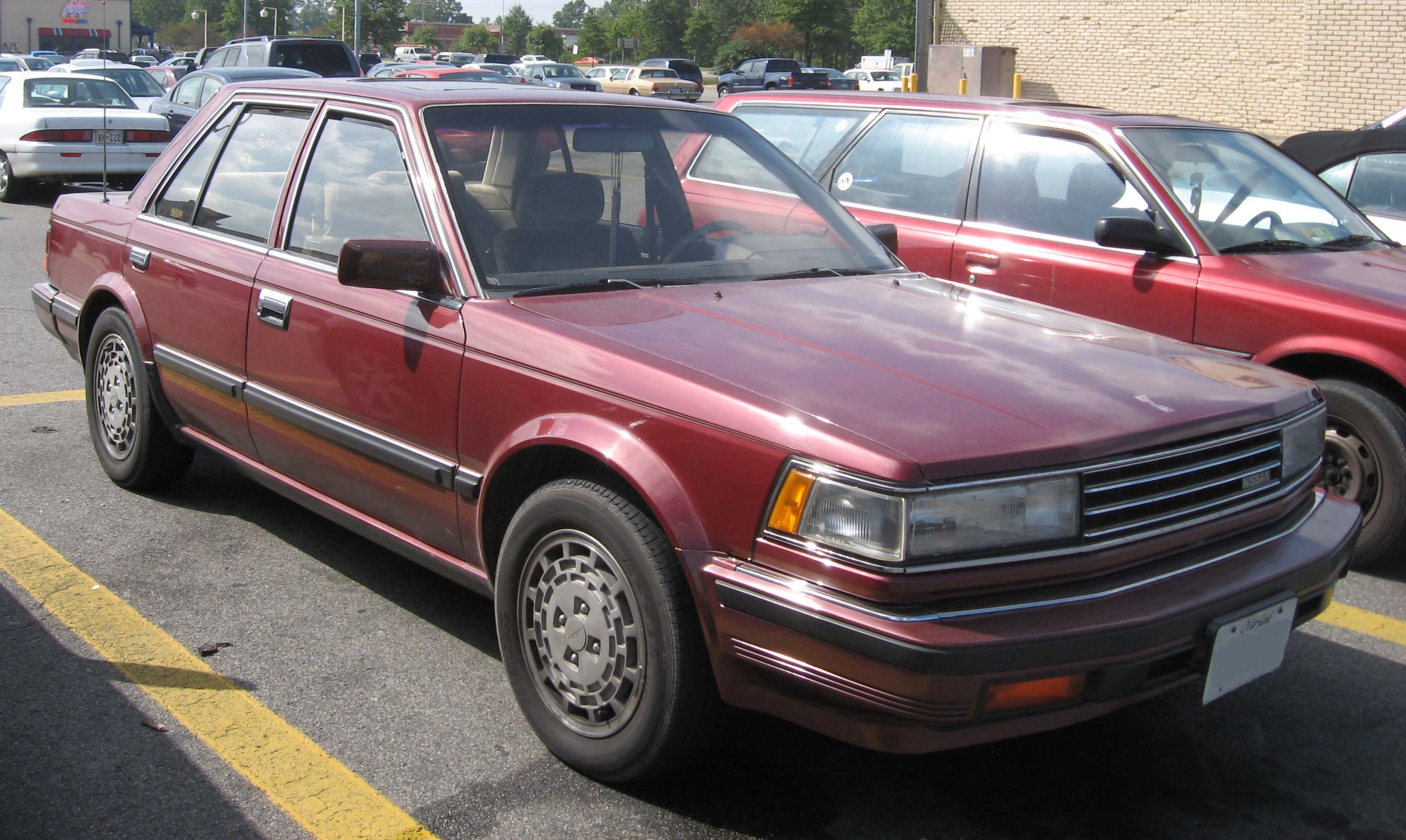

Overview
- Model code: U11 PU11
- Also called: Nissan Bluebird Maxima
- Production: July 1984 – August 1988
- Model years: 1985–1988
- Assembly: Japan: Oppama Plant, Yokosuka, Kanagawa

Body and chassis
- Body style: 4-door sedan 4-door hardtop sedan (Japan); 5-door station wagon
- Layout: Front-engine, front-wheel-drive
- Related: Nissan Bluebird (U11)

Powertrain
- Engine: Gasoline: 2.0 L VG20E V6 (Japan); 2.0 L VG20ET turbo V6 (Japan); 3.0 L VG30E V6
- Transmission: 5-speed RS5F50A manual 4-speed RL4F02A automatic

Dimensions
- Wheelbase: 2,550 mm (100.4 in)
- Length: Wagon: 184.8 in (4,694 mm); Sedan: 181.5 in (4,610 mm)
- Width: 66.5 in (1,689 mm)
- Height: Sedan: 54.7 in (1,389 mm); Wagon: 55.7 in (1,415 mm)

On October 17, 1984, the first front-wheel drive Maxima (based on the Bluebird U11) was introduced for the 1985 model year. This Maxima was available with a 157 hp (117 kW), 3.0-liter VG30E V6 engine and a four-speed automatic or a five-speed manual transmission. In Japan, a smaller 2.0-liter version of this engine was fitted. These engines were the first V6 engine to be mass-produced in Japan, and the first Nissan to utilize a V6 engine with front wheel drive. The second generation was assigned compact status in the US market. This was the last generation to be available as a station wagon, a version which had been offered since the Datsun 810 days.

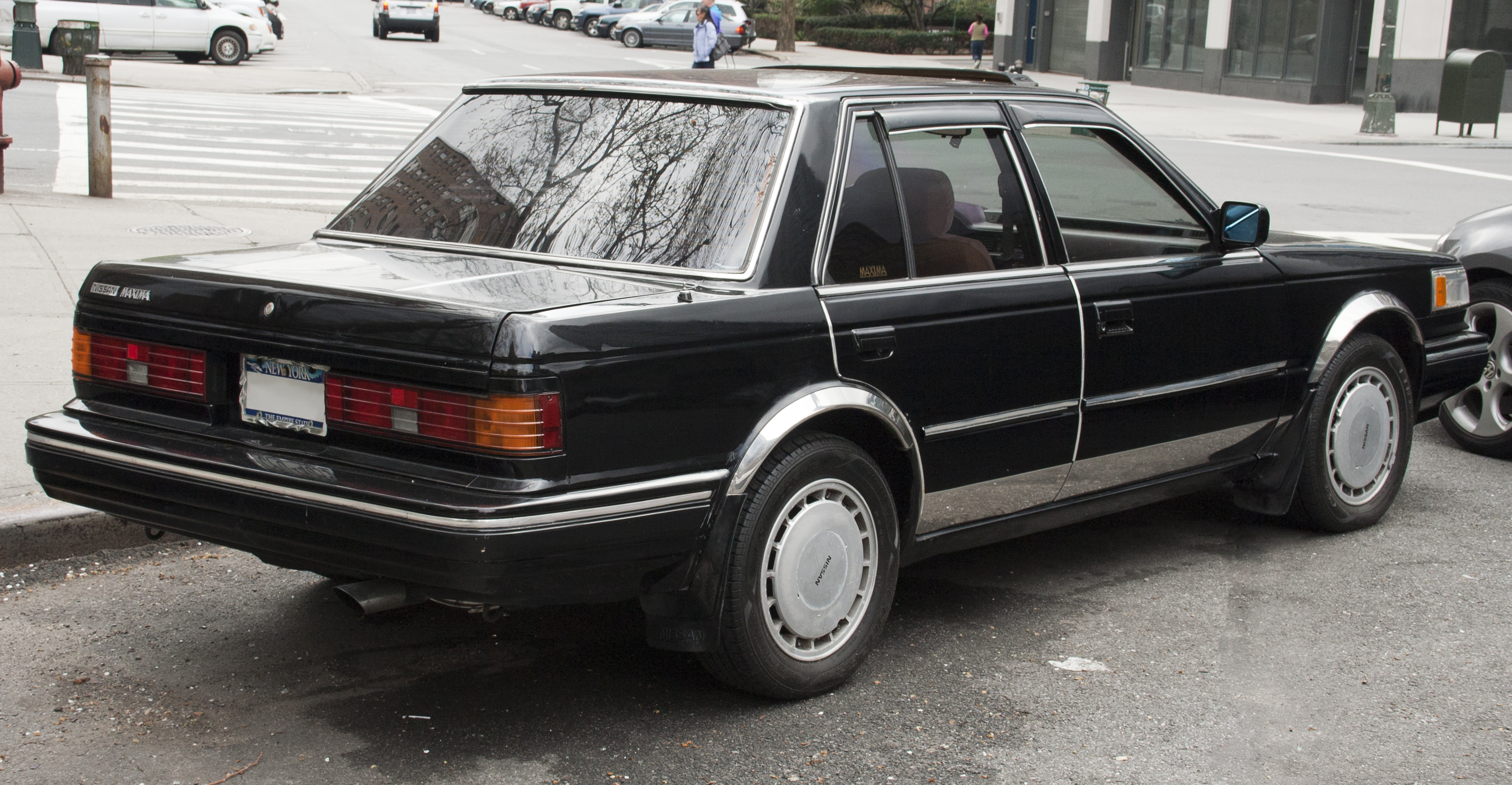
1987 Nissan Maxima sedan (US)

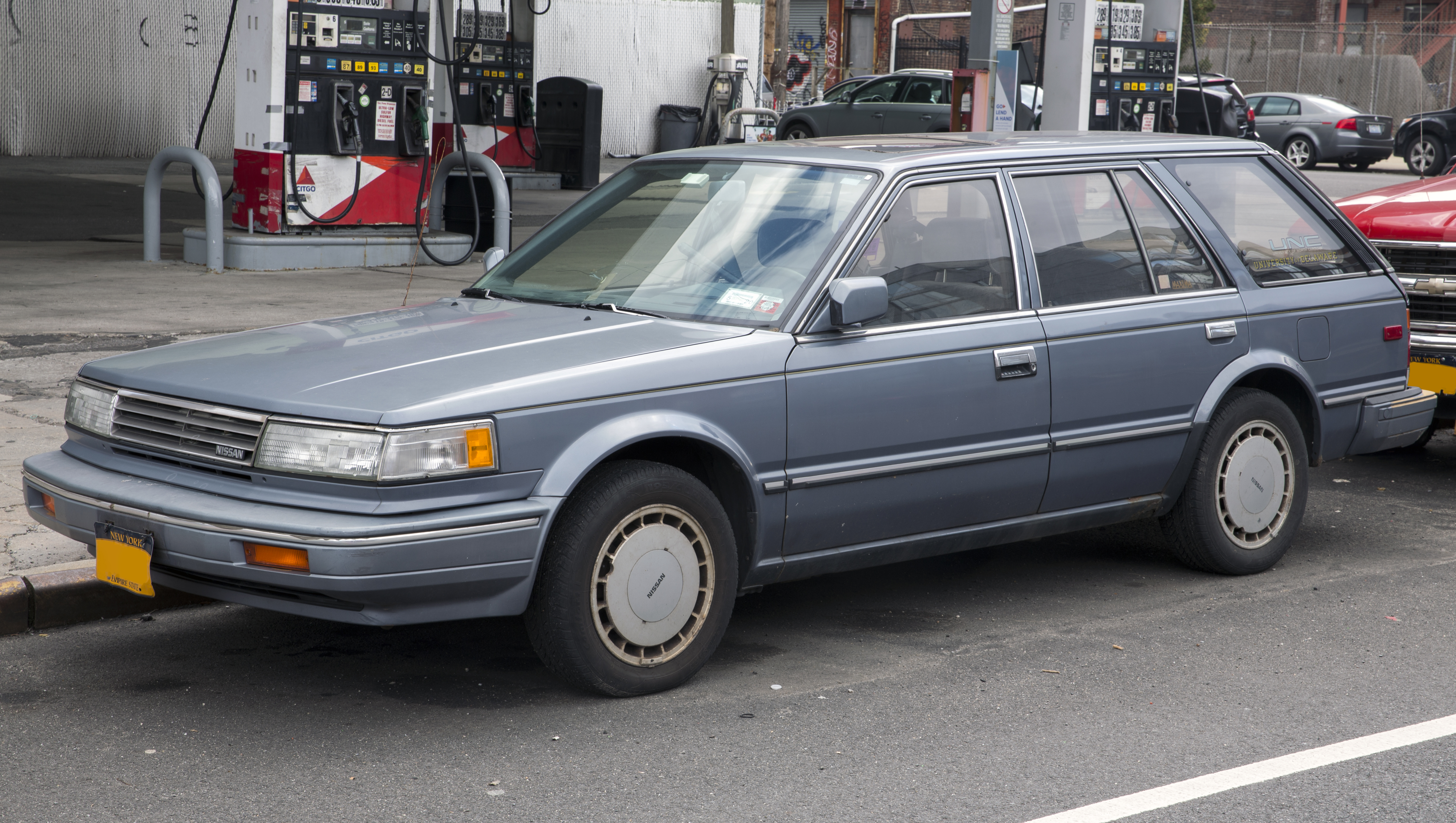
1988 Nissan Maxima GXE wagon (US)

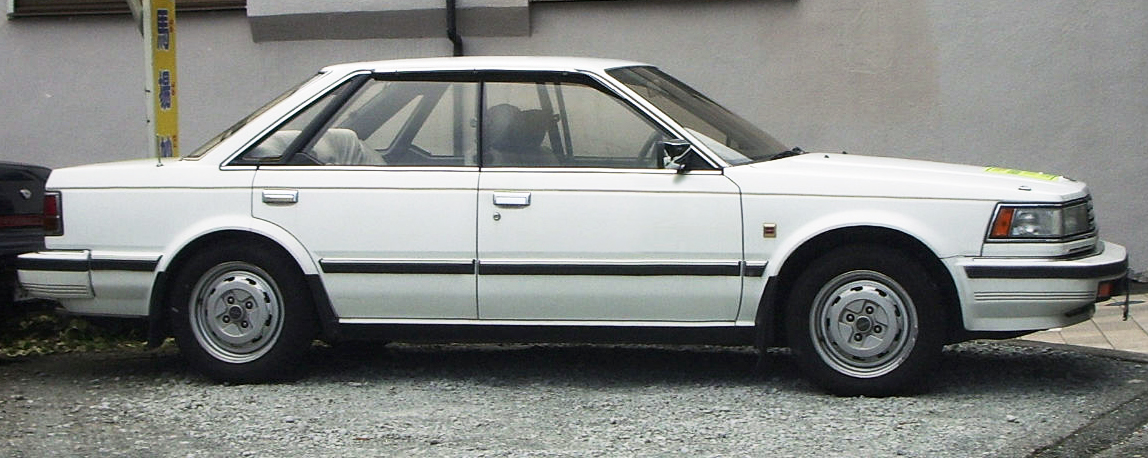
U11 series Nissan Bluebird Maxima hardtop (Japan)

In late 1986, the 1987 Maxima was introduced with a freshened exterior and interior. Automatic shoulder belts became featured on both the 1987 sedan and wagons built after February 1987. Luxury amenities were offered on both the "base" GL, later renamed GXE and SE trim levels. Such features for the GL/GXE included digital touch entry system on the driver and passenger side door panel, power windows, locks, antenna, power seats, remote trunk release, voice warning system, optional leather seating, optional heated front seats, an optional Electronics Pkg (a sedan exclusive, it included a digital instruments and a trip computer) and an optional power sunroof (sunroof was standard on Maxima wagons). 15-inch alloy wheels were standard for the Maxima.

An exclusive option for 1988 was the DUET-SS Super Sonic Suspension -which was part of the Electronics Pkg- replacing the trip computer that was previously offered. This feature used sonar waves to monitor the road conditions ahead and adjusted the shocks accordingly for the most controlled ride. The electronically controlled shock absorbers were installed on a trailing arm suspension for both the front and rear wheels. 1988 was also the year that the previously standard digital touch system offered on the GXE sedan became part of the 'Electronics Package' option as well. The SE (and some GXEs) offered dual power seats, a five-speed manual transmission, three-way shock adjustable suspension, front and rear windshield defroster, and a factory-installed security system. The SE also featured an integrated trunk lid spoiler, all-wheel disc brakes, black side view mirrors and body molding (GXE got body-color side view mirrors and matching body molding). Again, the Maxima's primary competitor was the luxury focused Toyota Cressida, which remained rear wheel drive.

The Japanese market Nissan Bluebird Maxima (Japanese: 日産・ブルーバードマキシマ, Hepburn: Nissan Barūbādo Makishima) received either four-door hardtop sedan or pillared sedan bodywork and a 2.0-liter V6 engine (with an available turbocharger). It received the smaller V6 engine so that it would avoid bigger taxes on vehicles with larger engine displacement. The station wagon body style was not available in Japan, with the hardtop being exclusive to Nissan Store Japanese dealerships.

== Third generation (1989) ==
Nissan Maxima
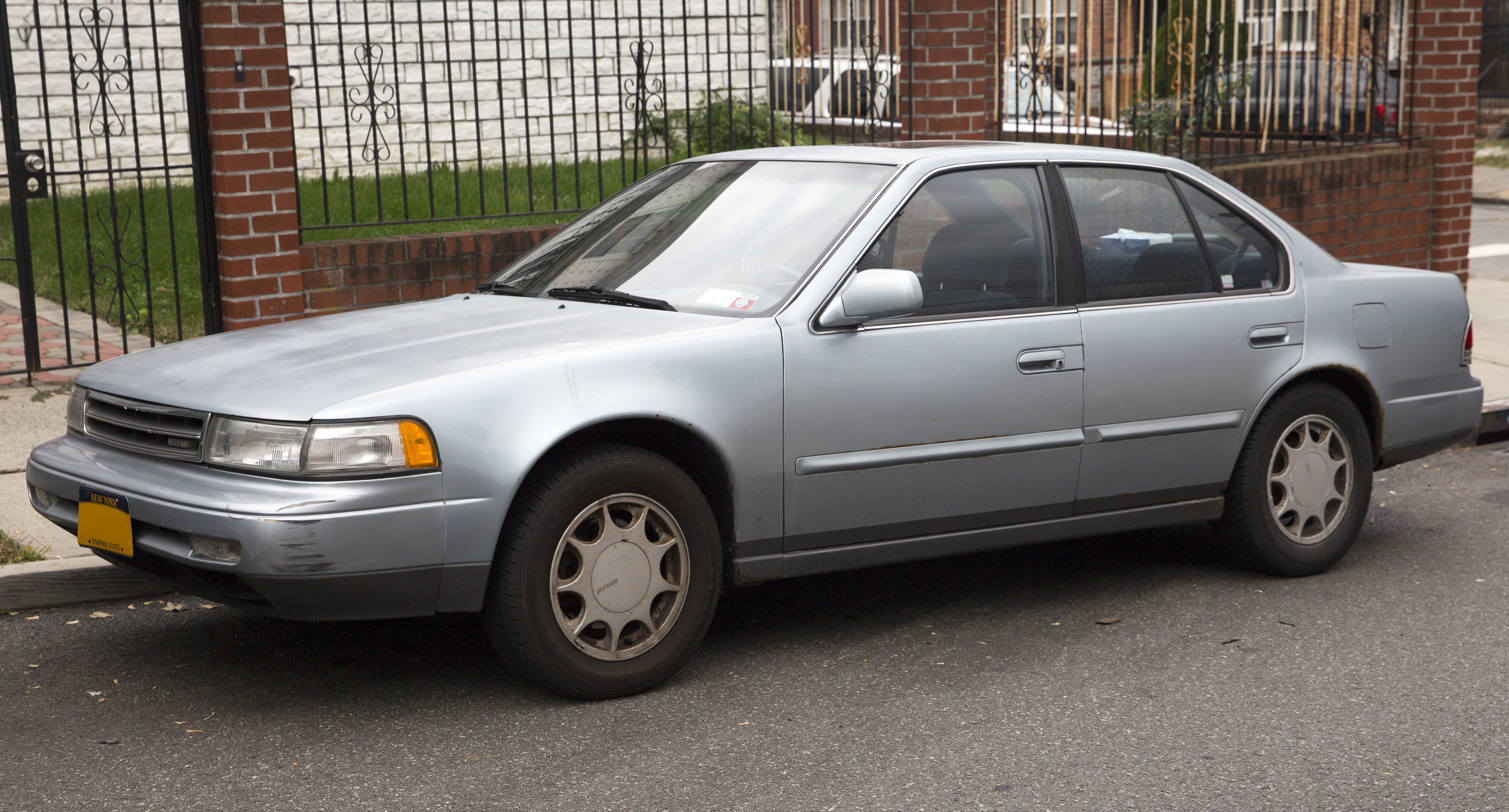

Overview
- Model code: J30
- Production: August 1988 – March 1994
- Model years: 1989–1994
- Assembly: Japan: Oppama Plant, Yokosuka, Kanagawa; South Africa: Rosslyn, Gauteng (NSA)

Body and chassis
- Body style: 4-door sedan
- Layout: Front-engine, front-wheel-drive
- Related: Mercury Villager; Nissan Quest (V40); Nissan Quest (V41)

Powertrain
- Engine: Gasoline: 3.0 L VG30E V6; 3.0 L VE30DE V6
- Transmission: 5-speed manual (88–91 RS5F50A) (SE 91–94 RS5F50V); 4-speed automatic (88–94 RE4F02A) (SE 91–94 RE4F04V)

Dimensions
- Wheelbase: 104.3 in (2,650 mm)
- Length: 187.6 in (4,765 mm)
- Width: 69.3 in (1,760 mm)
- Height: 1988–91: 55.1 in (1,400 mm); 1991–94: 53 in (1,346 mm)

The redesigned Maxima debuted on October 24, 1988 for the 1989 model year, internally designated J30. Larger dimensions made it the second Japanese sedan sold in North America to qualify as a "mid-size" (after the Mazda 929). Nissan used a "4DSC" window decal on the third-generation Maxima in North America, marketing it as a "four-door sports car." This generation was briefly marketed in Japan, replacing the Nissan Leopard sedan at Nissan Store locations. A refresh occurred in August 1991 for the 1992 model year (from July 1991 production), adding a driver's side SRS airbag.

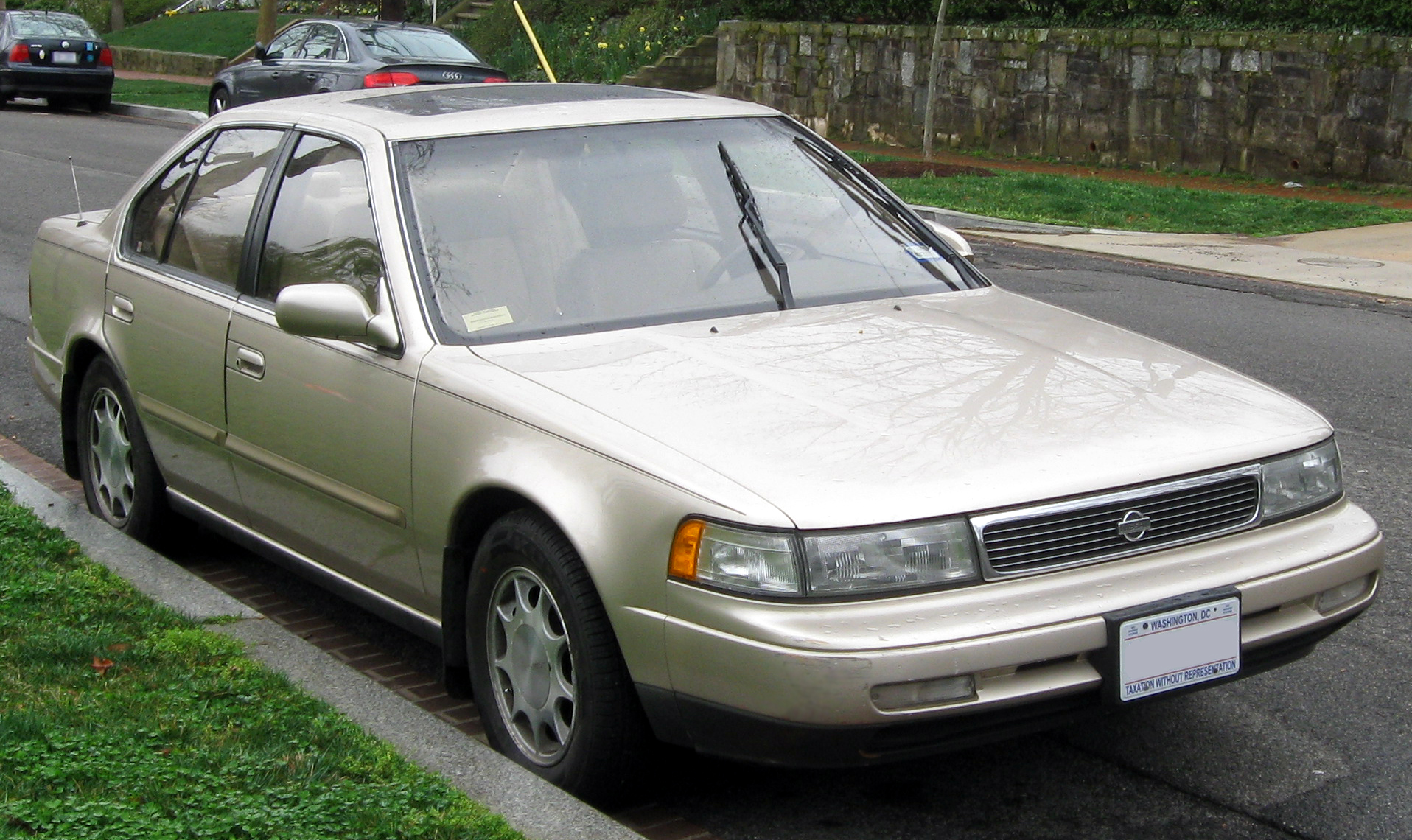
1992–1994 Nissan Maxima (US)

It became available with the 160 hp (119 kW), 3.0-liter VG30E V6, with the 190 hp (142 kW), VE30DE unit standard on the SE model beginning with the 1992 model year. In the United States, the VG30E engine, which featured a variable intake manifold on automatic and manual transmission models, was used on all 1989 to 1994 GXE models and 1989 to 1991 SE models. This generation Maxima was fitted with an independent trailing arm rear suspension, and continued to offer the road scanning, electronic Super Sonic Suspension (sonar). The digital touch entry system on the GXE (in conjunction with the new Luxury Package) allowed the windows to be lowered and the moon roof opened from outside the vehicle on a keypad integrated on the front door handle, without the key in the ignition. One of the industry's first heads-up displays was also included in the package for the 1989 to 1992 model years. The system projected a holographic image of the vehicle's speed on a small screen in the windshield.

The VE30DE engine was exclusively offered on the 1992–1994 Maxima SE. It was a 3.0-liter, 24 valve, DOHC motor. Its iron block was topped with aluminum cylinder heads and featured a dual length intake manifold (5-speed model only), variable intake valve timing, coil on plug ignition, plus a limited-slip differential. The VE30DE was rated at 190 hp (142 kW) at 5600 rpm and 190 lb⋅ft (258 N⋅m) at 4000 rpm, and had a 6500 rpm redline. SE models include white-faced gauges, twisted-spoke turbine wheels (.5 inch wider than GXE wheels and similar in design to wheels offered on the Z31 300ZX), body-colored grille, twin-tip mufflers, factory-tinted tail lights and rear garnish, black trim replacing chrome, firmer sport suspension, and optional 5-speed manual transmission. The automatic transmission on all GXEs (RE4F02A) was a compact unit from Jatco, which featured "sport" and "comfort" modes that shifted at different points. The 1992 to 1994 SE received an optional automatic transmission (RE4F04V) that had stronger internals, but kept the "sport" and "comfort" modes. The SE also had a rear spoiler and black side mirrors, whereas the GXE has body-color side mirrors.

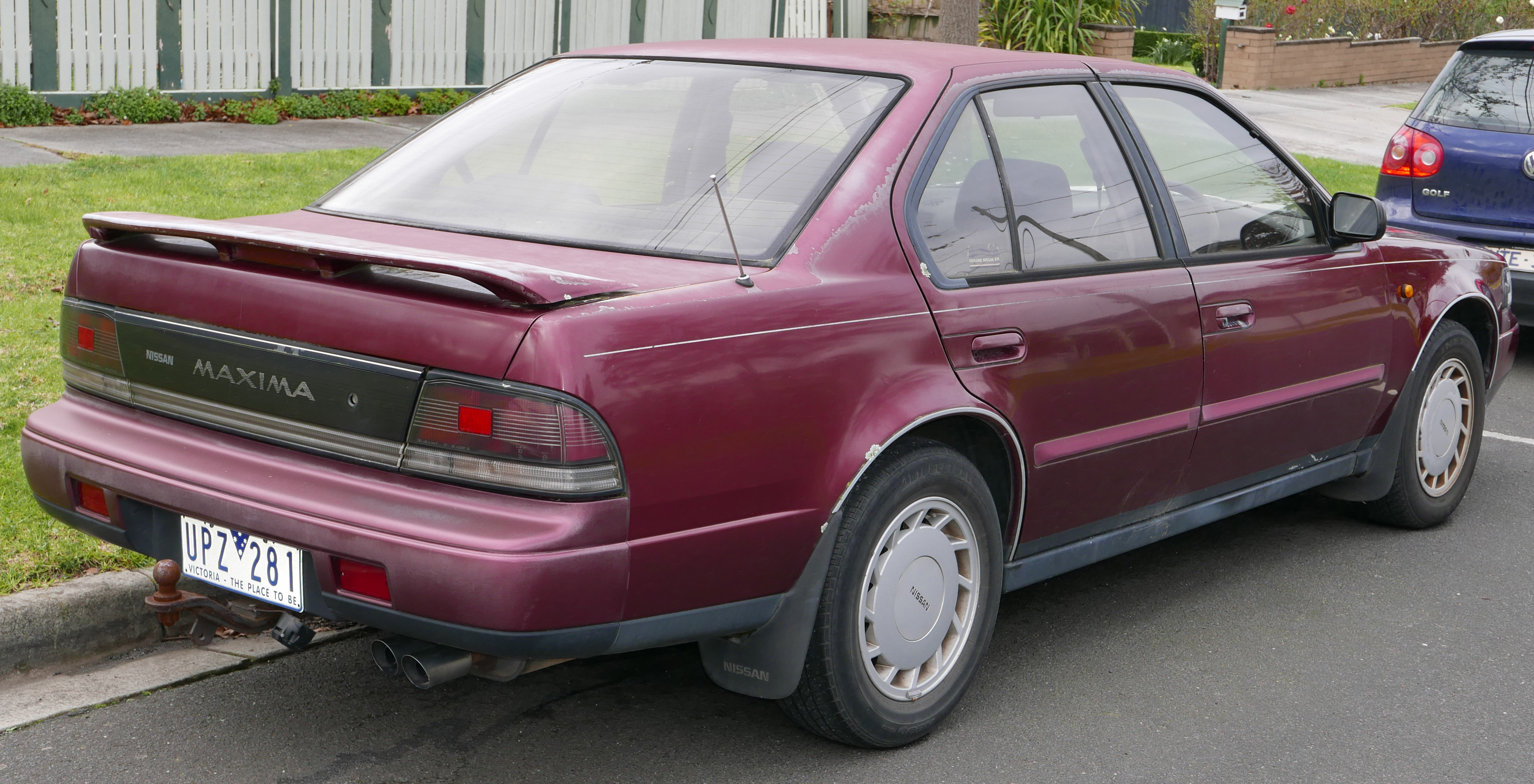
1990 Nissan Maxima Ti (Australia)

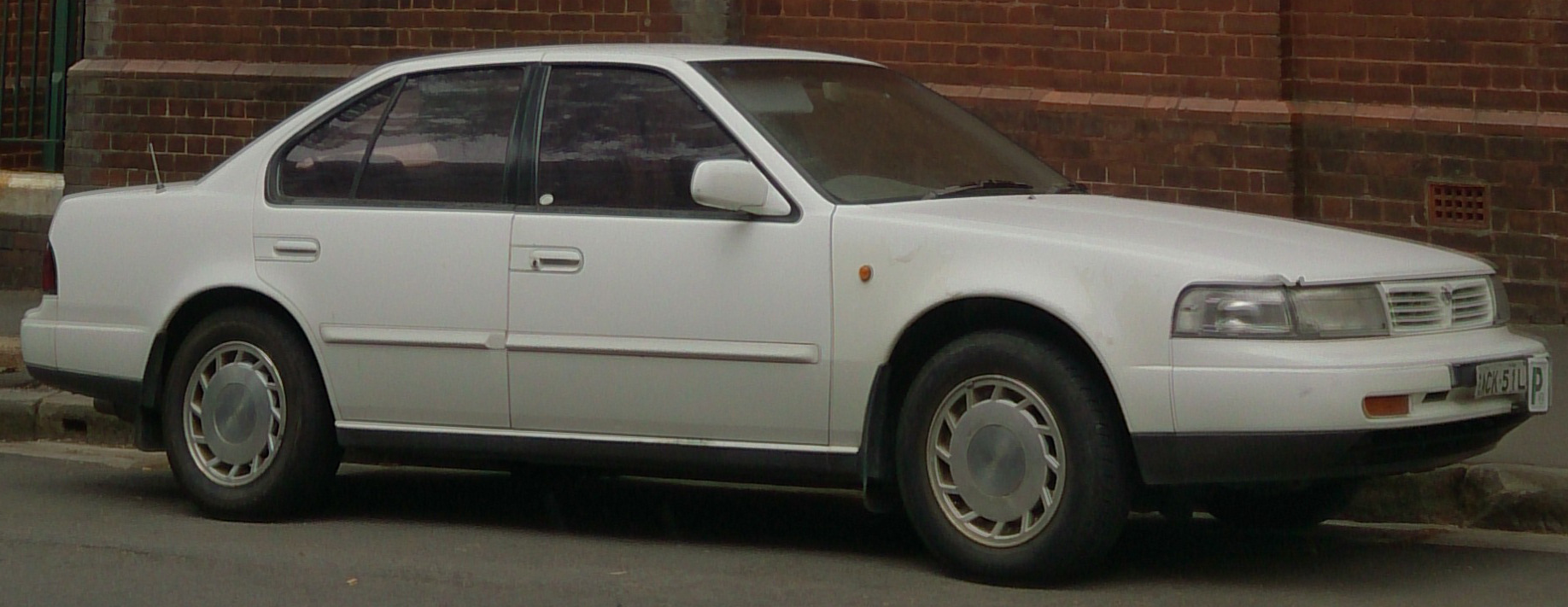
1993–1995 Nissan Maxima Executive (Australia)

During this year, the Maxima was first introduced to the European market, replacing the Laurel. For European markets, the model range was: 3.0, 3.0 S, and 3.0 SE. The only engine was the single-cam VG30E, producing 170 PS (125 kW; 168 bhp).

Nissan Australia began importing the J30 series for a May 1990 release to replace the locally assembled Nissan Skyline (R31) sedan and station wagon. Powertrain comprised the 3.0-liter VG30E V6 rated at 122 kW (164 hp) and a four-speed automatic. Nissan made the Maxima available in two equipment grades, the M and Ti. The M featured air conditioning, alloy wheels, central locking, cruise control, power steering, and power windows. The Ti added a rear spoiler, climate control air conditioning, anti-lock brakes, electric seats and a PIN touch-pad locking system. The M-based LE of late 1991 featured a CD player and sunroof. There was also a leather/sunroof pack optional on Ti. Nissan Australia released a facelift in January 1993 that included a new grille insert, revised tail lamps, wheels and cabin trim. A driver airbag became fitted to the Ti, and made optional on the new Executive trim that replaced the M. The J30 in Australia was replaced in February 1995 by a new Maxima based on the Nissan Cefiro (A32).

The three variants assembled locally in New Zealand had automatic transmissions and the VG30E Engine only. Versions sold in Japan and Europe had a manual transmission option as an alternative to the automatic transmission that was standard in North America and Australia/New Zealand. The Maxima SE was on Car and Driver magazine's Ten Best list for 1990.

Another Bluebird Maxima continued on as a Nissan Bluebird (U12) and solely as a station wagon with the VG20ET engine during this period until the introduction of the U13 Bluebird, and the Avenir replaced the Bluebird wagon altogether.

== Fourth generation (1995) ==
Nissan Maxima
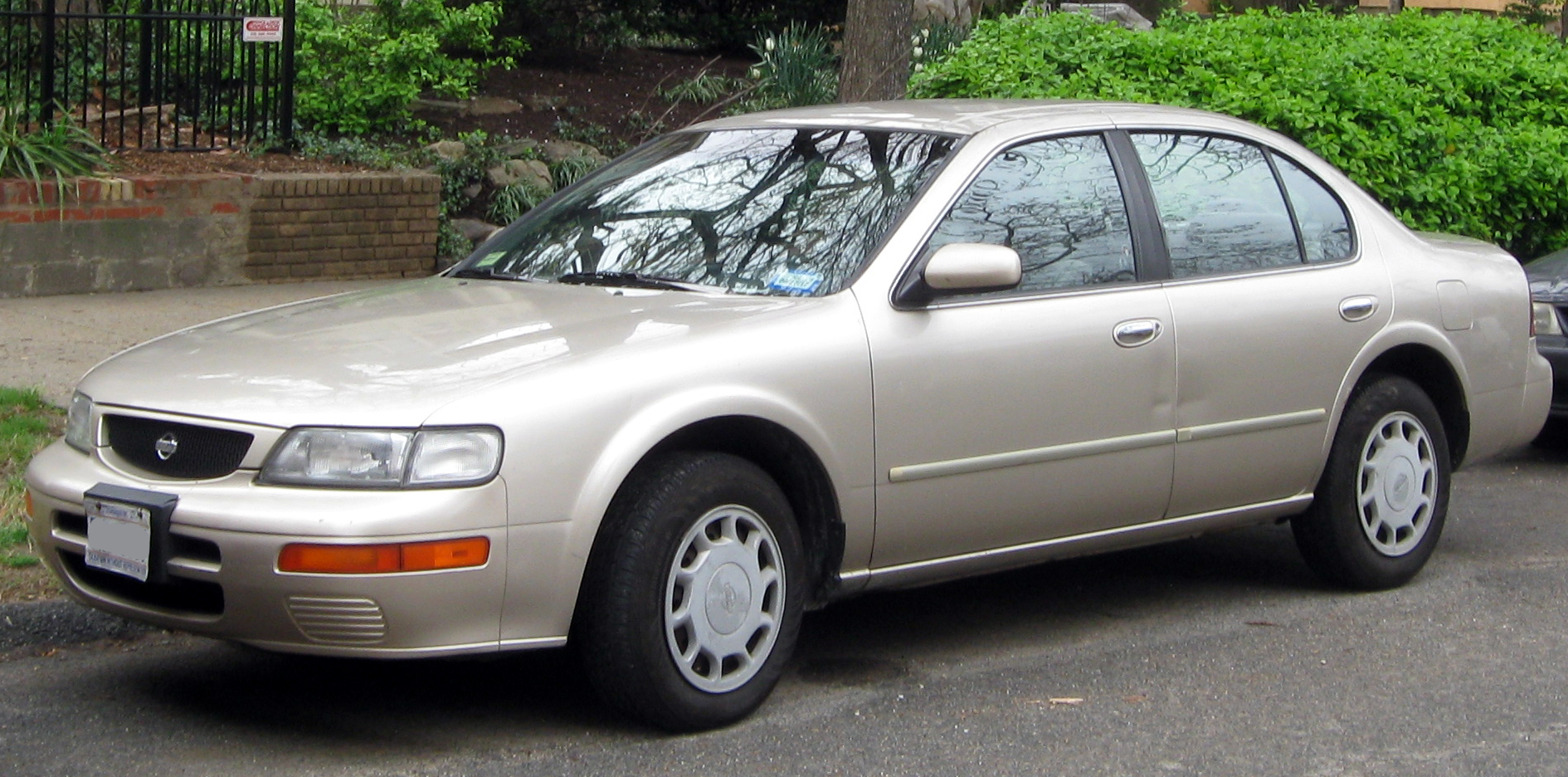

Overview
- Model code: A32
- Also called: Infiniti I30; Nissan Cefiro (A32); Nissan Maxima QX (EU); Nissan QX (UK); Renault Samsung SM5
- Production: February 1994 – March 1999
- Model years: 1995–1999
- Assembly: Japan: Oppama Plant, Yokosuka, Kanagawa

Body and chassis
- Body style: 4-door sedan
- Layout: Front-engine, front-wheel-drive

Powertrain
- Engine: Gasoline: 1995 cc VQ20DE V6; 2988 cc VQ30DE V6
- Transmission: 5-speed manual (RS5F50A); 4-speed automatic (RE4F04A)

Dimensions
- Wheelbase: 2,700 mm (106.3 in)
- Length: 1996–99: 4,811 mm (189.4 in); 1994–96: 4,768 mm (187.7 in)
- Width: 1,770 mm (69.7 in)
- Height: 1,415 mm (55.7 in)
- Curb weight: 1,302 kg (2,870 lb)

Designed from early 1990 to March 1991, the fourth-generation Maxima arrived in May 1994 for the 1995 model year as the A32. A new VQ30DE 190 hp (141 kW), 205 lb⋅ft (278 N⋅m) 3.0 liter V6 was the only engine option for the North American market. The VQ30DE earned a first spot on the Ward's 10 Best Engines List, and the VQ became recognized consecutively for every year since its introduction (as of 2012, 18 years running). The independent rear suspension of the previous generation was replaced with a lighter multi-link beam system, part of a general trend of cost-cutting by Japanese manufacturers in the wake of the bursting of Japan's economic bubble of the early 1990s.

The Maxima's primary competitor, the Toyota Cressida, was discontinued after the 1992 model year, with Toyota touting the front-wheel-drive Toyota Avalon, a stretched version of the Toyota Camry introduced in 1994, as its replacement.

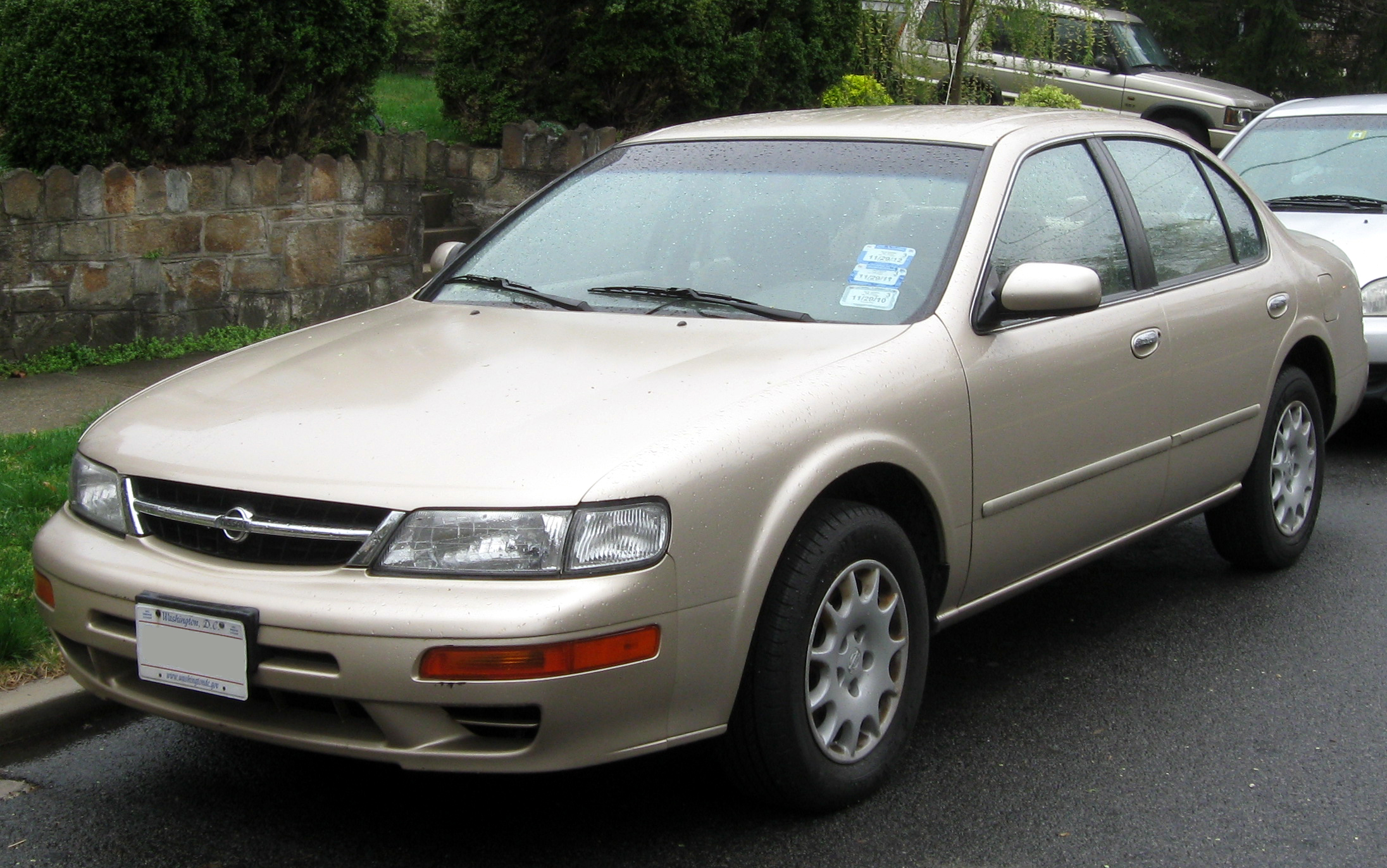
1997–1999 Nissan Maxima (US)

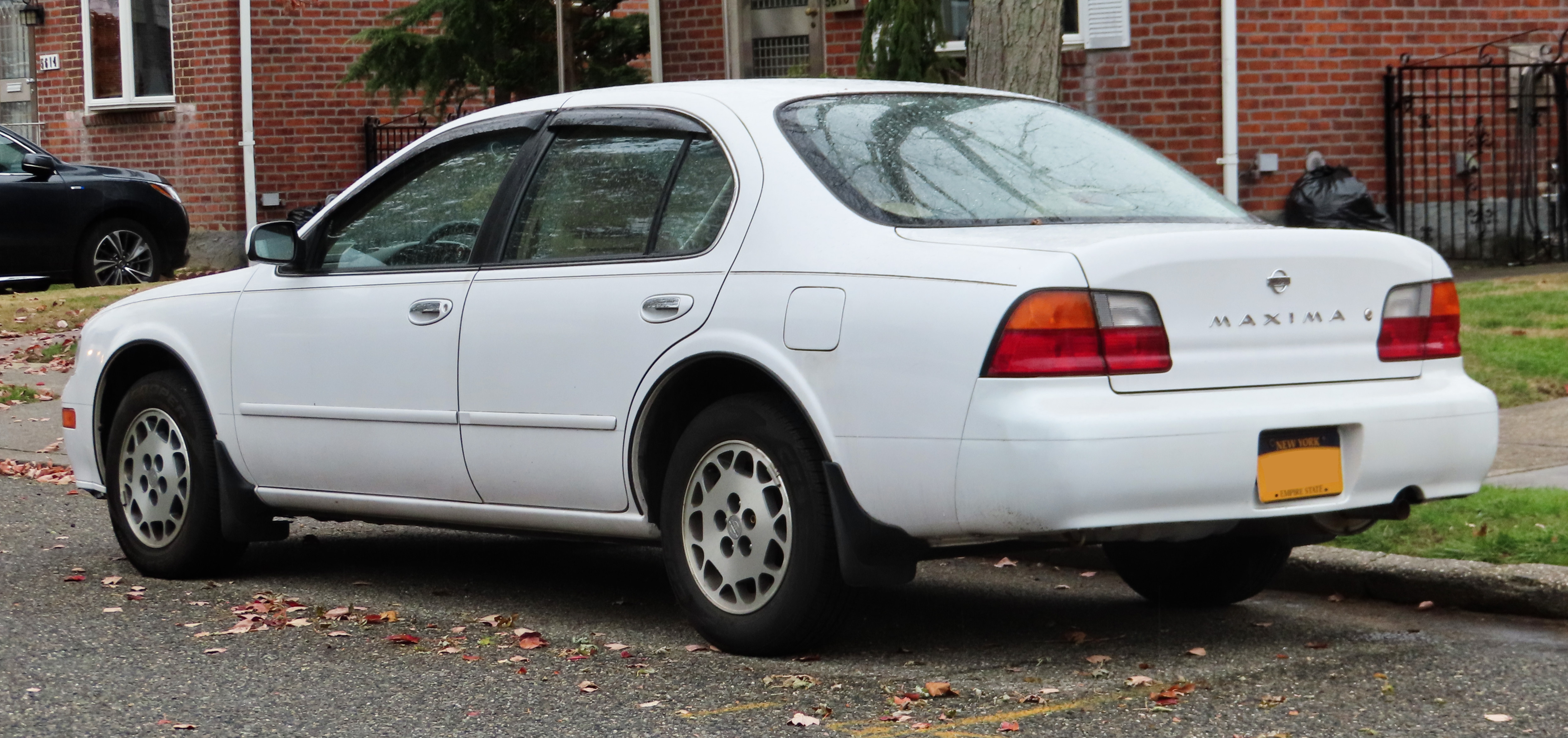
Rear view

The North American 1995 Maxima included a Bose Sound System on the GLE (optional on the SE), which had a 6-speaker sound system, a Clarion system was also an option (non-Bose). The fourth-generation Maxima was highly praised for its quiet, roomy interior. This Maxima was Motor Trend's Import Car of the Year for 1995. The Maxima SE again made Car and Driver magazine's Ten Best list for 1995 and 1996.

The 1995's VQ30DE (3.0 liter) engine produced 190 hp (142 kW) and 205 lb⋅ft (278 N⋅m) of torque. With the manual transmission 0–60 mph took 6.6 seconds with a quarter-mile time of 15.2-seconds at 92.4-mph, making it both the quickest and fastest (142 mph top speed) Japanese sedan on the North American market at that time. A top-of-the-line 1995 Maxima GLE equipped with a four-speed automatic transmission turned in a 7.6 second 0-60-mph run with a 15.8-second/88.6-mph quarter-mile time.

At the time, the Maxima was one of few four-door, six-cylinder cars sold in North America with a standard manual transmission. A viscous limited slip differential came standard on Canadian SE models equipped with the 5-speed manual (in the US, the VLSD was restricted to the Infiniti I30). The automatic was a no cost option, which most Maximas were equipped with.

In October 1996, the Maxima's exterior was refreshed for 1997, with new five-spoke alloy wheels, plastic (clear-lens) headlights vs. the previous glass headlights, a slightly different front and rear fascia with new redesigned tail-lights, the rear-facing part of the trunk was smoothed out to match the tail-lights, redesigned fog-lights and badge designs, and a chrome grille insert for GLE's (body color for SE models) was added. Among interior changes were a different steering wheel and CD player. Front seat-mounted side impact airbags were added as an option for 1998 and 1999 SE and GLE models. There were also structural modifications to improve crash worthiness for the 1997 to 1999 models. The 1999 Nissan Maxima also saw some minor changes: an Anti-Theft Engine Immobilizer was standard using a chip in the ignition key, as well as some minor body trims. The 1999 Maxima SE was also available with a Limited Package which consisted of Titanium tinted SE-Limited emblems on the front doors, titanium tinted trunk emblems, and titanium tinted 16" alloy wheels. The interior gauge cluster was also titanium tinted and the optional leather seats were perforated and embossed with SE on the backrests. The front floor mats were also embossed with SE-Limited logos.

As the Maxima badge was retired in Japan, this particular generation was sold there as the Nissan Cefiro A32. The Cefiro badge had previously been used on a Nissan Laurel-based, higher specification model with rear-wheel drive (see A31 Cefiro). For the Japanese market, a Cefiro-badged station wagon was also available. One version of the Cefiro (Brougham VIP spec) was sold in the US as the Infiniti I30, yet the Cefiro had subtle differences including different fog light arrangements, one-piece headlights and a few assorted engine options (VQ20/25/30DE). The Cefiro was actually introduced first, in August 1994, and was originally available with 2 and 2.5-liter V6 engines with 155 or 190 PS (114 or 140 kW) JIS.

This generation was also sold as the Maxima QX in Europe and other parts of the world, and was mostly identical to the Japanese Cefiro except for minor trim differences. In Europe a smaller, two-liter V6 engine with 140 PS (103 kW) was available in addition to the larger 3.0, to suit local taxation structures.

== Fifth generation (2000) ==
Nissan Maxima
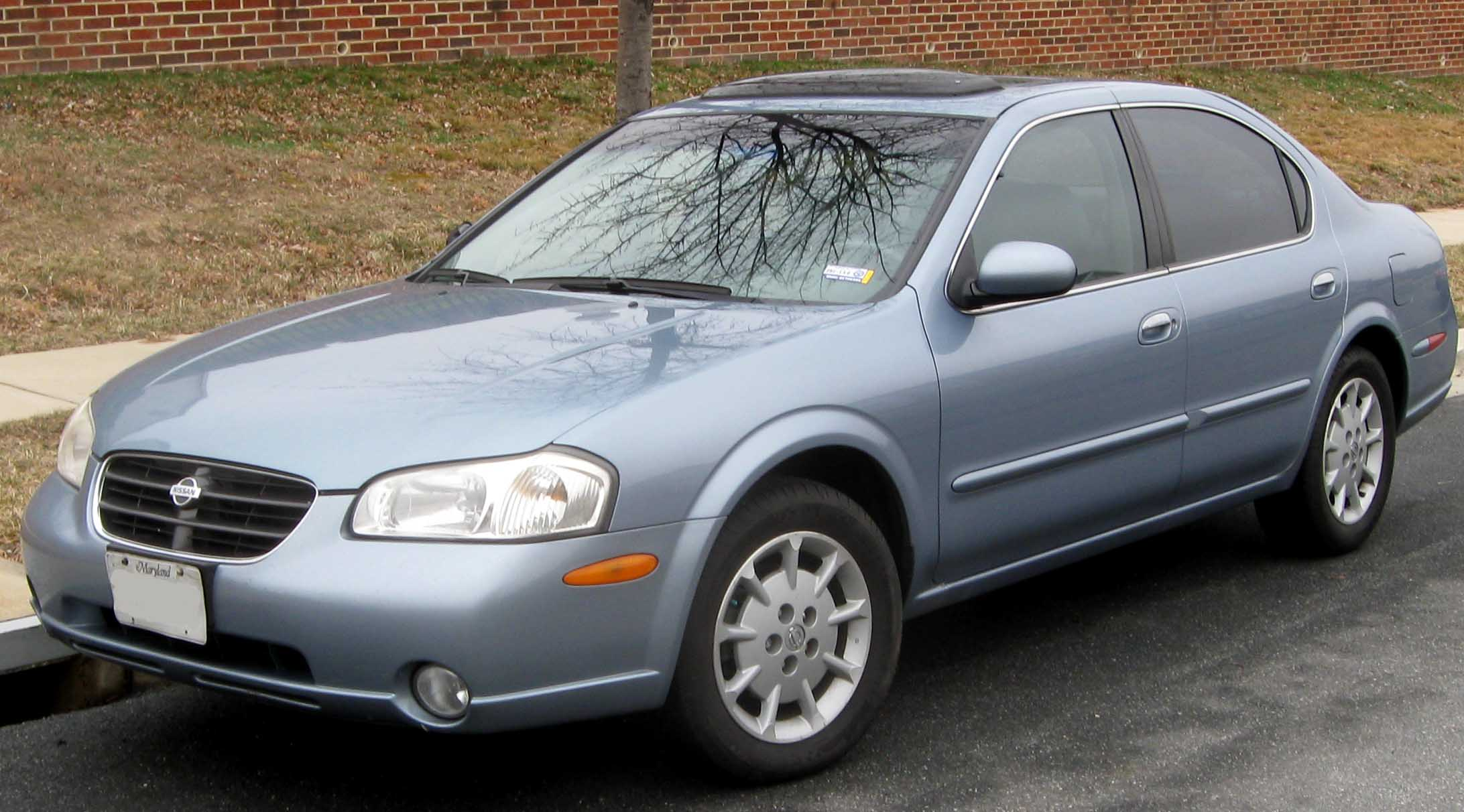

Overview
- Model code: A33B
- Also called: Nissan Cefiro (A33B); Nissan Maxima QX (Europe)
- Production: April 1999 – December 2002
- Model years: 2000–2003
- Assembly: Japan: Oppama Plant, Yokosuka, Kanagawa
- Designer: Jerry Hirshberg (1997)

Body and chassis
- Body style: 4-door sedan
- Layout: Front-engine, front-wheel-drive
- Related: Infiniti I30/I35

Powertrain
- Engine: Gasoline: 3.0 L VQ30DE-K V6; 3.5 L VQ35DE V6
- Transmission: 4-speed automatic (RE4F04A / RE4F04W); 5-speed manual (RS5F50A / RS5F50V); 6-speed manual (RS6F51A)

Dimensions
- Wheelbase: 108.3 in (2,751 mm)
- Length: 1999–2001: 190.5 in (4,839 mm); 2001–03: 191.5 in (4,864 mm)
- Width: 70.3 in (1,786 mm)
- Height: 1999–2001: 56.5 in (1,435 mm); 2001–03 GXE: 56.3 in (1,430 mm); 2001–03 SE: 56.7 in (1,440 mm); 2001–03 GLE: 57.1 in (1,450 mm)
- Curb weight: 3,245 lb (1,472 kg)

Introduced in May 1999, the 2000 Maxima was designed at Nissan's La Jolla, California design studio 1996–1997 under the direction of Jerry Hirshberg, and was internally designated A33B. The fifth-generation Maxima was a badge engineered variant of the JDM A33 Nissan Cefiro, which was itself marketed globally, including by Nissan North America's luxury Infiniti brand as the I30 and subsequently as the I35. The A33 Cefiro was marketed in Europe as the Maxima QX.

The engine was a 222 hp (166 kW) 3.0 L VQ30DE V6 for all versions except the SE, which produced 227 hp (169 kW). The vehicle has a 0–60 mph time of 7.0 seconds. This variant of the VQ30DE was referred to as the VQ30DE-K. The A33b was offered in GXE (base), GLE (luxury, with 16 inch alloy wheels) and SE trim levels, the latter offering a rear trunklid spoiler.

For the 2001 model year, Nissan offered an SE model trim package commemorating the model's 20th anniversary. In addition to SE content, the commemorative edition used the Infiniti I30 engine, ground effect rocker panels, drilled metal "brushed metallic" pedals, brushed metallic shifter, and stainless steel door embossed sill plates. The optional leather interior was perforated, unlike that in the regular SE. Finally, the "SE Comfort and Convenience Package" included a sunroof and 17" dark chrome alloy wheels.

For the 2002 model year, the Maxima received a mild facelift. The A33B received the 3.5 L VQ35DE producing 255 hp (190 kW) and 246 lb⋅ft (334 N⋅m) of torque, the engine used in the Infiniti I35. The facelifted version received a larger, revised grille and front bumper openings, revised foglamps with vertical lines in the glass lens, larger Nissan emblem on the grille, a revised headlamp design with high-intensity discharge (HID) low beams, a six-speed manual transmission with optional helical Torsen limited-slip differential borrowed from the Japan market Nissan Skyline GT-R (identified by brushed, metal pedals for the accelerator, brake, and clutch), revised 17-inch 6-spoke alloy wheels in silver on the SE model, new 17-inch 7-spoke machined alloy wheels on the GLE model, clear Altezza-style taillights, a revised rocker moulding/side skirt standard on all models, and interior and refinements over the 2000 to 2001 models.

Some interior differences include slightly redesigned seats, a smaller screw-on shift knob on automatic models along with a different shift pattern, a redesigned steering wheel, revised headunits, and a different cup holder lid. Facelift SE models equipped with the six-speed manual transmissions were capable of 0-60 acceleration of 6.0 seconds with a 1/4 mile time of 14.7 seconds at 97 mph. The 2002–2003 models also posted better braking numbers, requiring 182 feet to stop from 70 mph, compared with the 195 feet of the earlier model.

For 2003, Nissan offered an option to SE trim, marketed as the Titanium Edition, including gloss titanium color 6-spoke alloy wheels and titanium interior accents. In the United States, the Meridian Edition option included heated front seats, steering wheel and outside mirrors; the Leather Package included leather-appointed seats, 4-way power passenger's seat and power driver's seat with memory function and entry/exit feature (SE A/T, std. GLE). Other options included Power Glass Sliding Sunroof with tilt (SE, GLE); front seat side- impact supplemental air bags (SE, GLE); traction control system (SE automatic, GLE); helical limited-slip differential (SE manual); Bose audio system (SE, std. GLE) and Nissan Navigation System (SE, GLE). In Russia and Europe, the Maxima was marketed as Nissan Maxima QX.

2000-2003 Nissan Maxima with a "D" in the 8th position in the VIN are equipped with a combination of head and torso seat mounted side airbags.

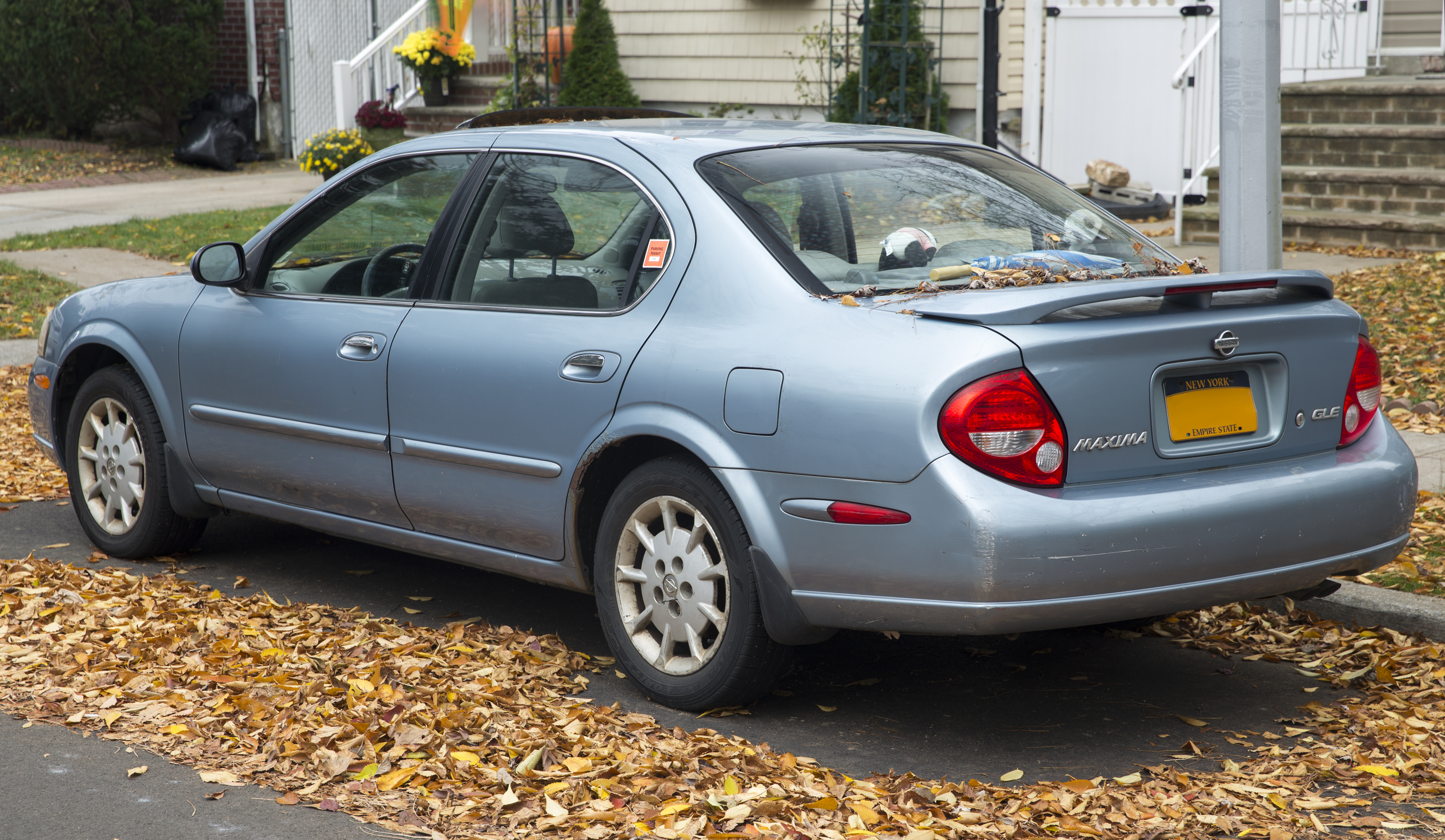
Rear view of pre-facelift Maxima GLE (US; 2000)

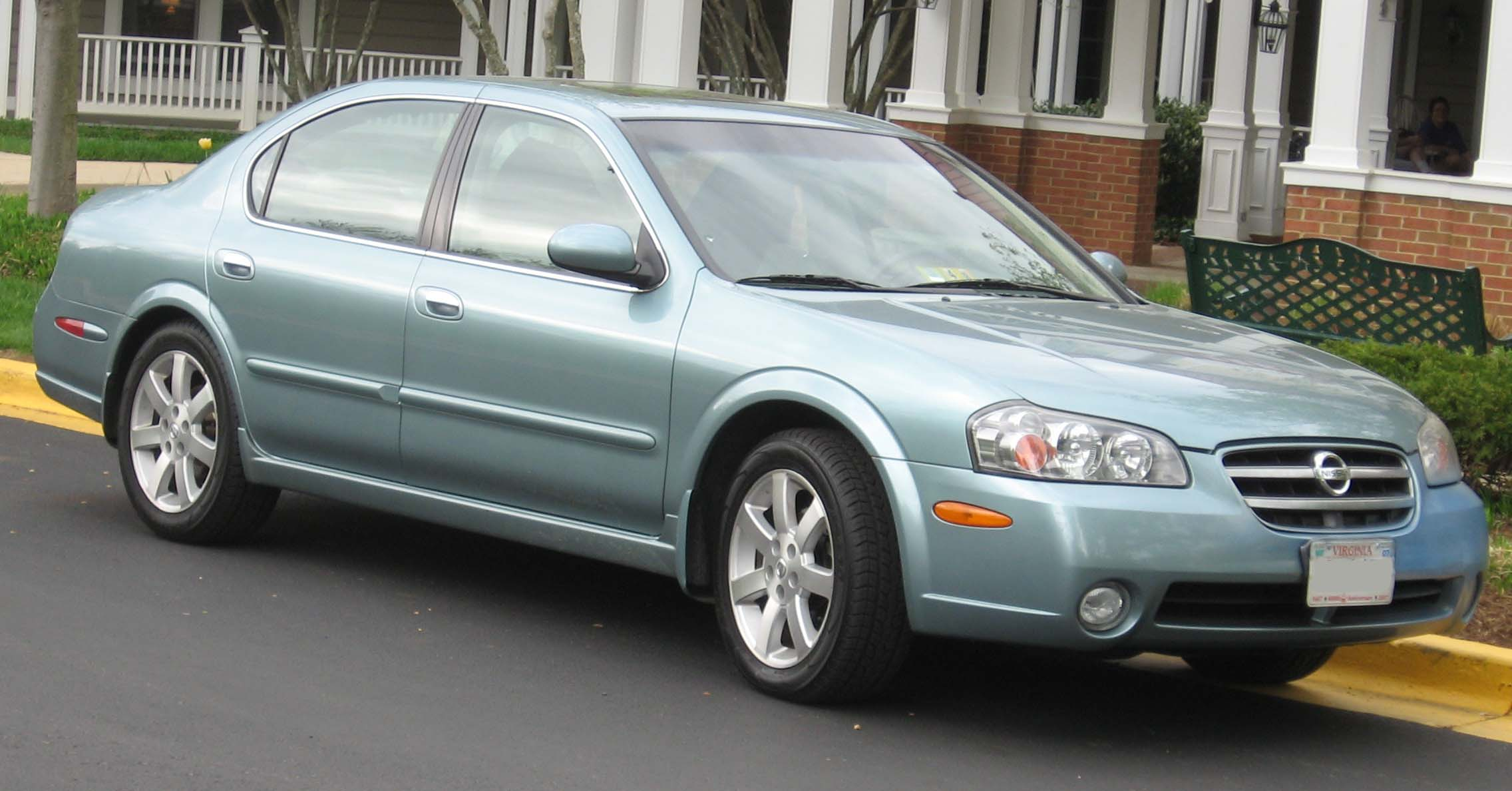
Facelifted Nissan Maxima GLE (US; 2002–2003)

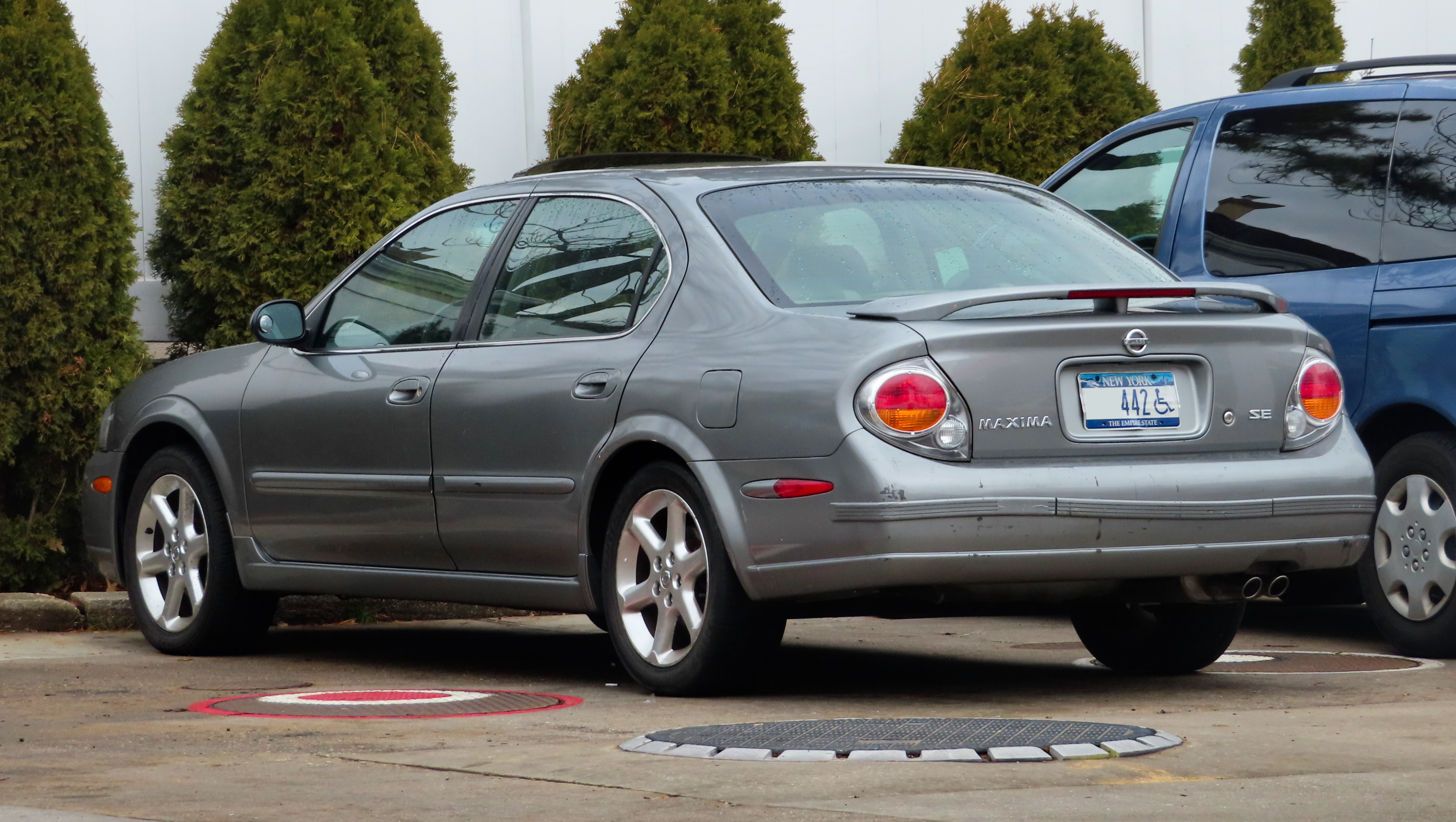
Rear view of facelifted Nissan Maxima SE (US; 2002)

== Sixth generation (2004) ==
Nissan Maxima
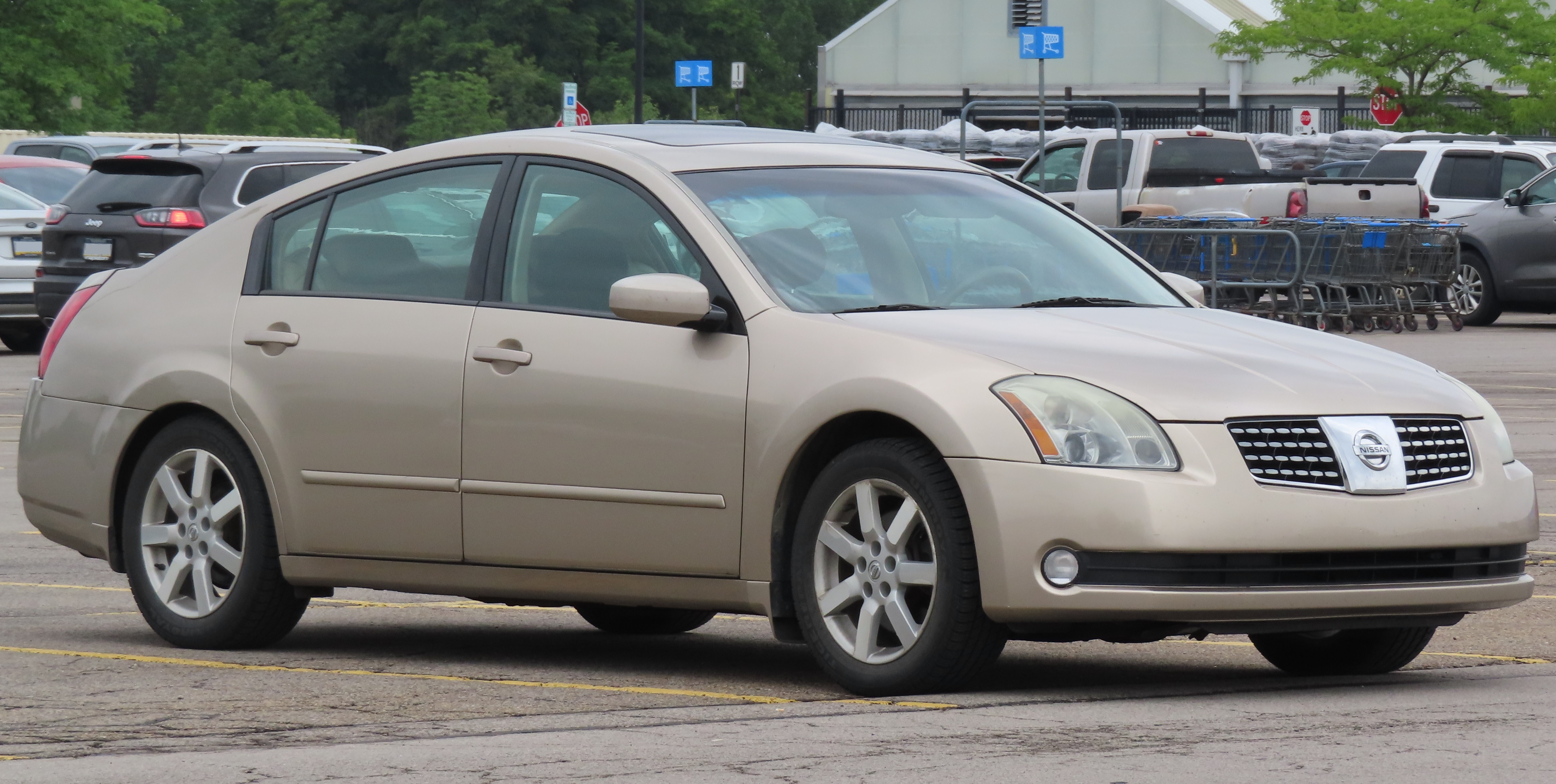
- 2005 Nissan Maxima 3.5 SL (US; pre-facelift)

Overview
- Model code: A34
- Production: January 2003 – May 2008
- Model years: 2004–2008
- Assembly: United States: Smyrna, Tennessee (Nissan Smyrna Assembly Plant)
- Designer: Jerry Hirshberg (2000)

Body and chassis
- Body style: 4-door sedan
- Layout: Front-engine, front-wheel-drive
- Platform: Nissan FF-L platform

Powertrain
- Engine: Gasoline: 3.5 L VQ35DE V6
- Transmission: 6-speed manual (RS6F51A / RS6F51H) (2004-2006); 4/5-speed automatic (2004-2006); CVT (2007-2008)

Dimensions
- Wheelbase: 111.2 in (2,824 mm)
- Length: 2003–2006: 193.5 in (4,915 mm); 2006–2008: 194.4 in (4,938 mm)
- Width: 71.7 in (1,821 mm)
- Height: 58.3 in (1,481 mm)
- Curb weight: 3,579 lb (1,623 kg)

The sixth-generation Maxima, code-named A34, was marketed solely in the United States, Canada and Mexico. It was developed from 1998 to 2002, with a March 2001 design freeze. It was introduced in production form as a 2004 model at the 2003 North American International Auto Show. In the US, it came with the VQ35DE, a DOHC V6 engine that produced 265 hp (198 kW) at 5,800 rpm, and 255 lb⋅ft (346 N⋅m) of torque at 4,400 rpm and a standard SkyView fixed glass paneled roof that ran down the center of the roof (from front to back) or an optional traditional style moonroof. Sixth-generation Maximas were available in two trim levels, SE and SL. The sporty SE model came standard with 18 inch alloy wheels, P245/45R18 V-rated tires, stiffer suspension, rear spoiler, and an optional 6-speed manual transmission. The luxurious SL model came standard with 17 inch alloy wheels, P225/55R17 H-rated tires, wood interior trim, 6-disc CD changer, Bose stereo, leather seats, and HID headlights and optional heated front seats. The manual transmission was never offered in the SL model and the suspension was tuned for a softer ride. For all models, the rear independent suspension returned, this time using a multilink setup similar to the Altima.

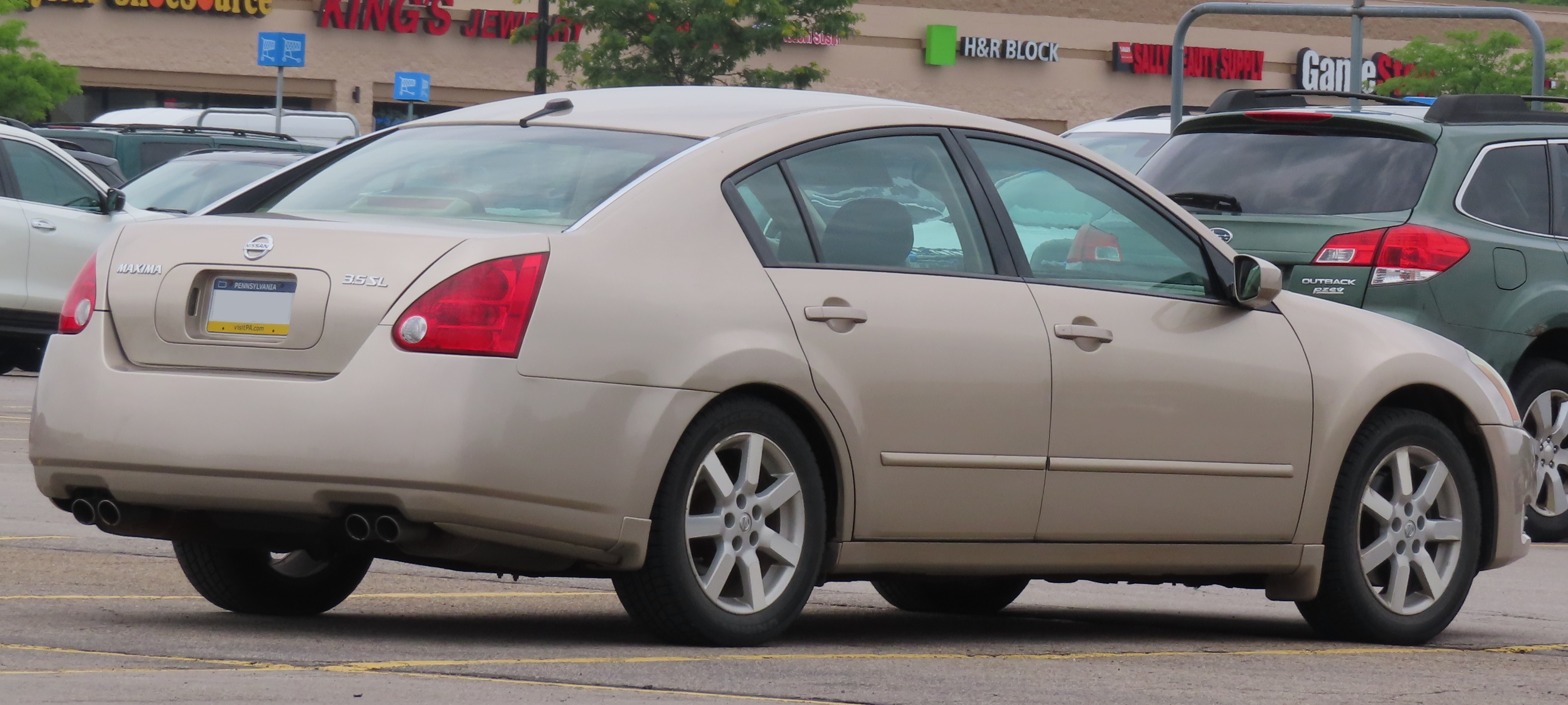
2005 Nissan Maxima 3.5 SL (US; pre-facelift)

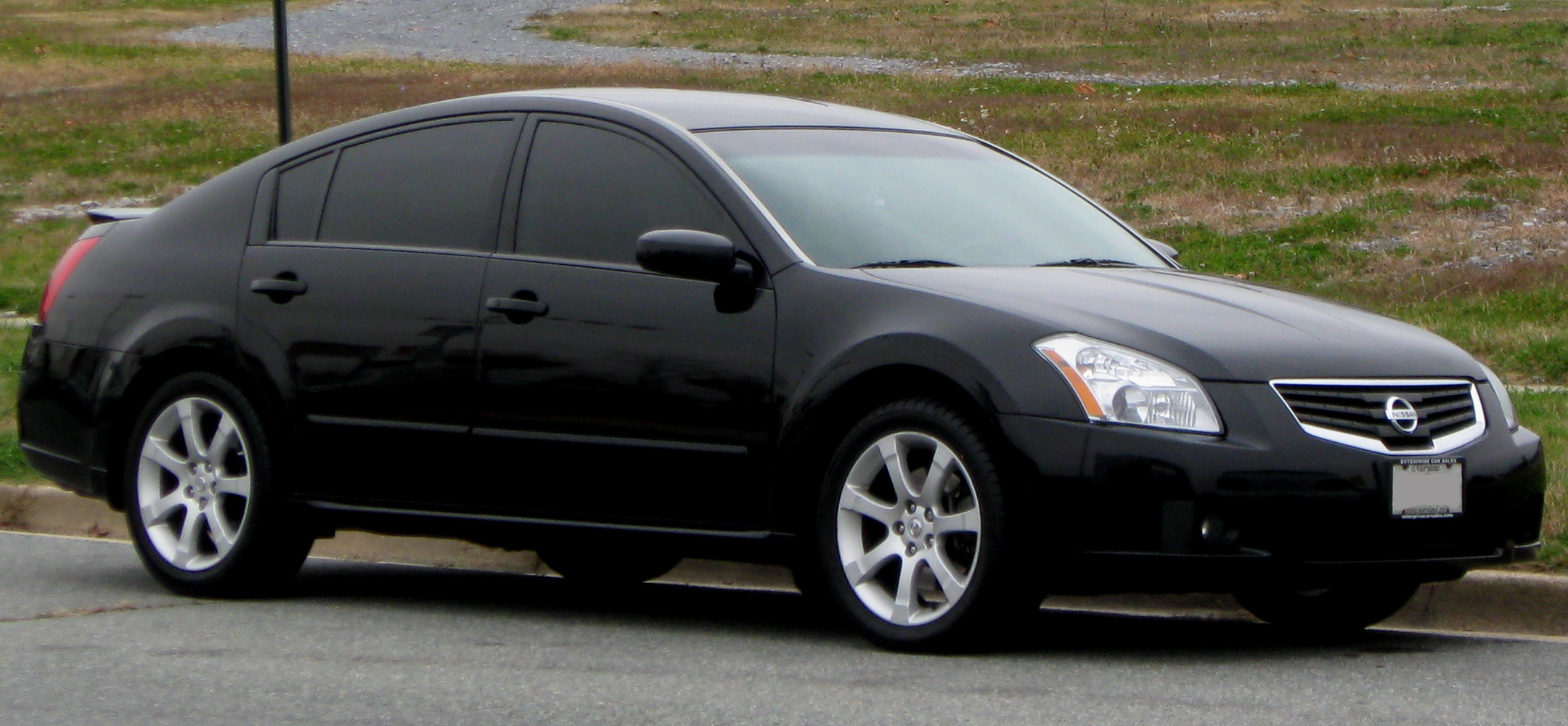
2007–2008 Nissan Maxima (US; facelift)

For 2007, the U.S. Maxima became available with a standard Xtronic CVT (Continuously Variable Transmission) (similar to the CVT found in the Nissan Murano) as the only transmission choice; a manual transmission was no longer offered, however the CVT featured a manual mode. It featured a freshened front fascia (lacking the center block, the new grille closely resembled that of the 2007 Altima). Headlights were also more squared around the edges. New interior changes included an Intelligent Key system with integrated ignition tab, new center console, and new white-and-orange gauges as opposed to the older pure orange ones.

For 2008, the Maxima's fuel economy dropped from 21MPG-City / 28MPG-Highway to 19/25 due to new EPA measurement methods. A Platinum Edition package of convenience features was added for 2008 on both SE and SL trim levels.

In Australia, the Maxima had the same engine, but Nissan set the maximum power to only 170 kW (228 hp). The Australian version was code-named J31, shared the VQ engine, initially only came with a four-speed automatic transmission, and had quite noticeable styling differences to the North American version as it was based on the Nissan Teana. In 2007, it received a minor mid-life facelift and an all-new CVT automatic transmission.

The North American Maxima was known for a balance between sport and luxury; other models tended to focus more on comfort.

=== Safety ===
ANCAP test results* Nissan Maxima Ti variants (2006)
Test	Score
Overall	4 /5 stars
Frontal offset	12.19/16
Side impact	15.89/16
Pole	2/2
Seat belt reminders	0/3
Whiplash protection	Not Assessed
Pedestrian protection	Marginal
Electronic stability control	Standard

== Seventh generation (2009) ==
Nissan Maxima
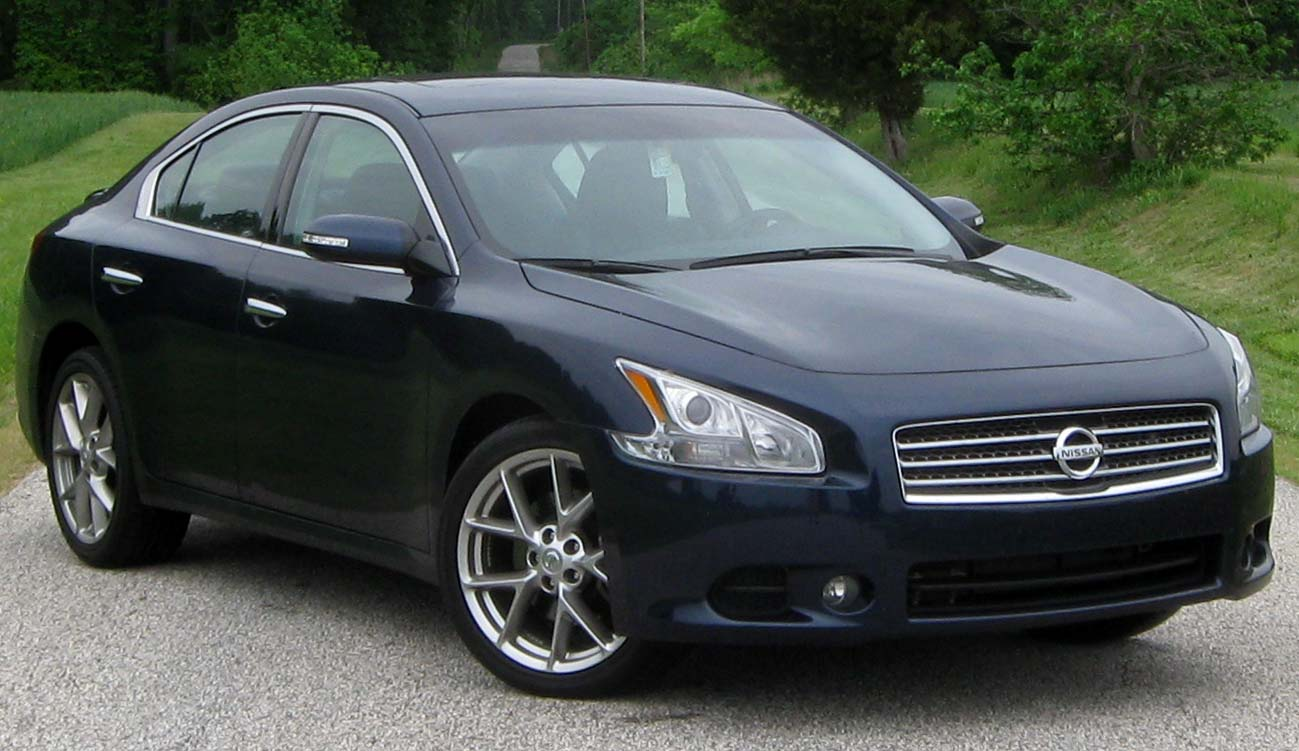

Overview
- Model code: A35
- Production: May 2008–December 2014
- Model years: 2009–2014
- Assembly: United States: Smyrna, Tennessee (Nissan Smyrna assembly plant)
- Designer: Shiro Nakamura (2006)

Body and chassis
- Body style: 4-door sedan
- Layout: Front-engine, front-wheel-drive
- Platform: Nissan D platform
- Related: Nissan Altima (L32)

Powertrain
- Engine: 3.5 L VQ35DE V6
- Transmission: CVT

Dimensions
- Wheelbase: 109.3 in (2,776 mm)
- Length: 190.6 in (4,841 mm)
- Width: 73.2 in (1,859 mm)
- Height: 57.8 in (1,468 mm)
- Curb weight: 3,565 lb (1,617 kg)

Chronology
- Predecessor: Nissan Maxima (A33) (Middle East)

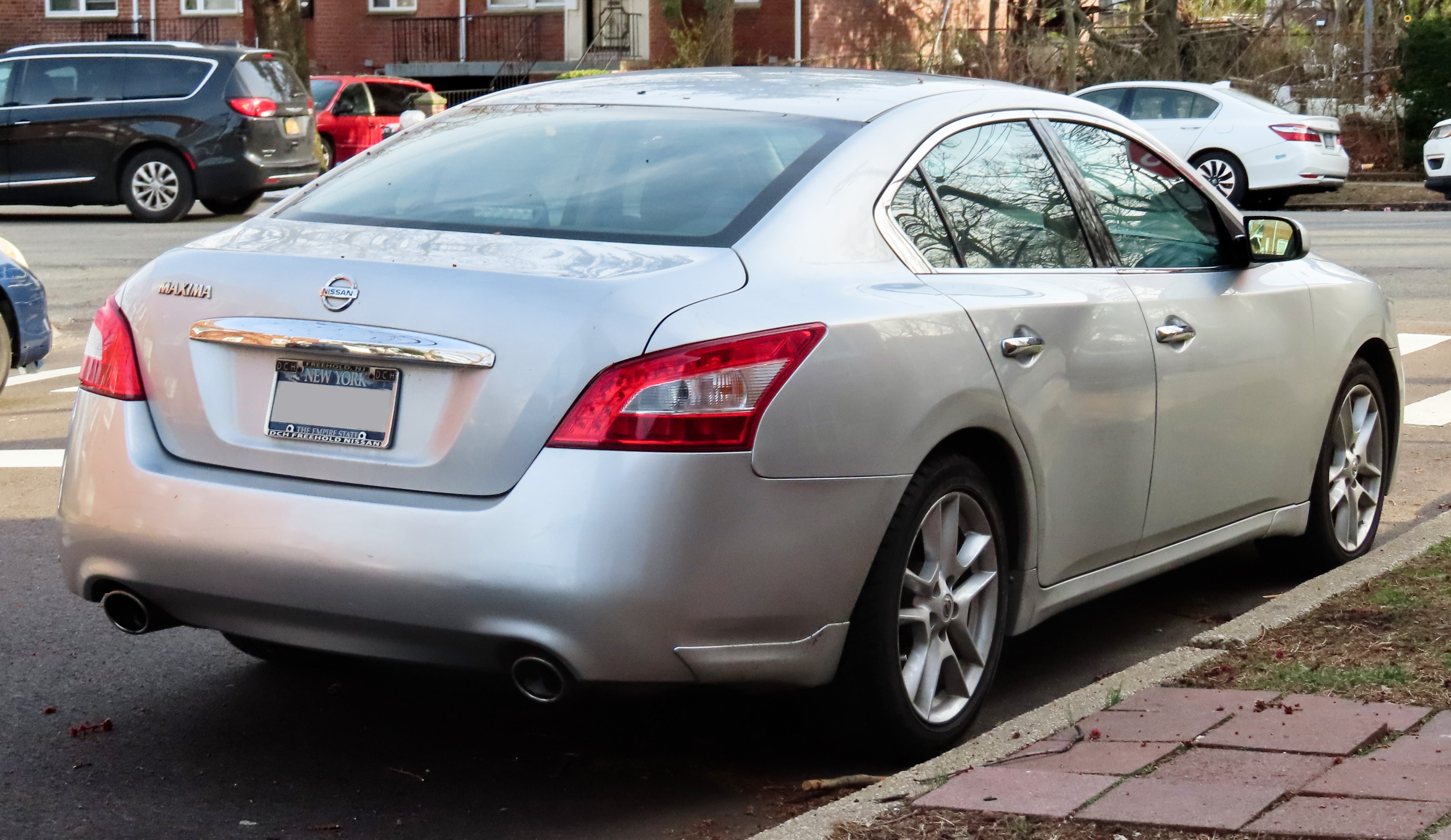
2011 Nissan Maxima

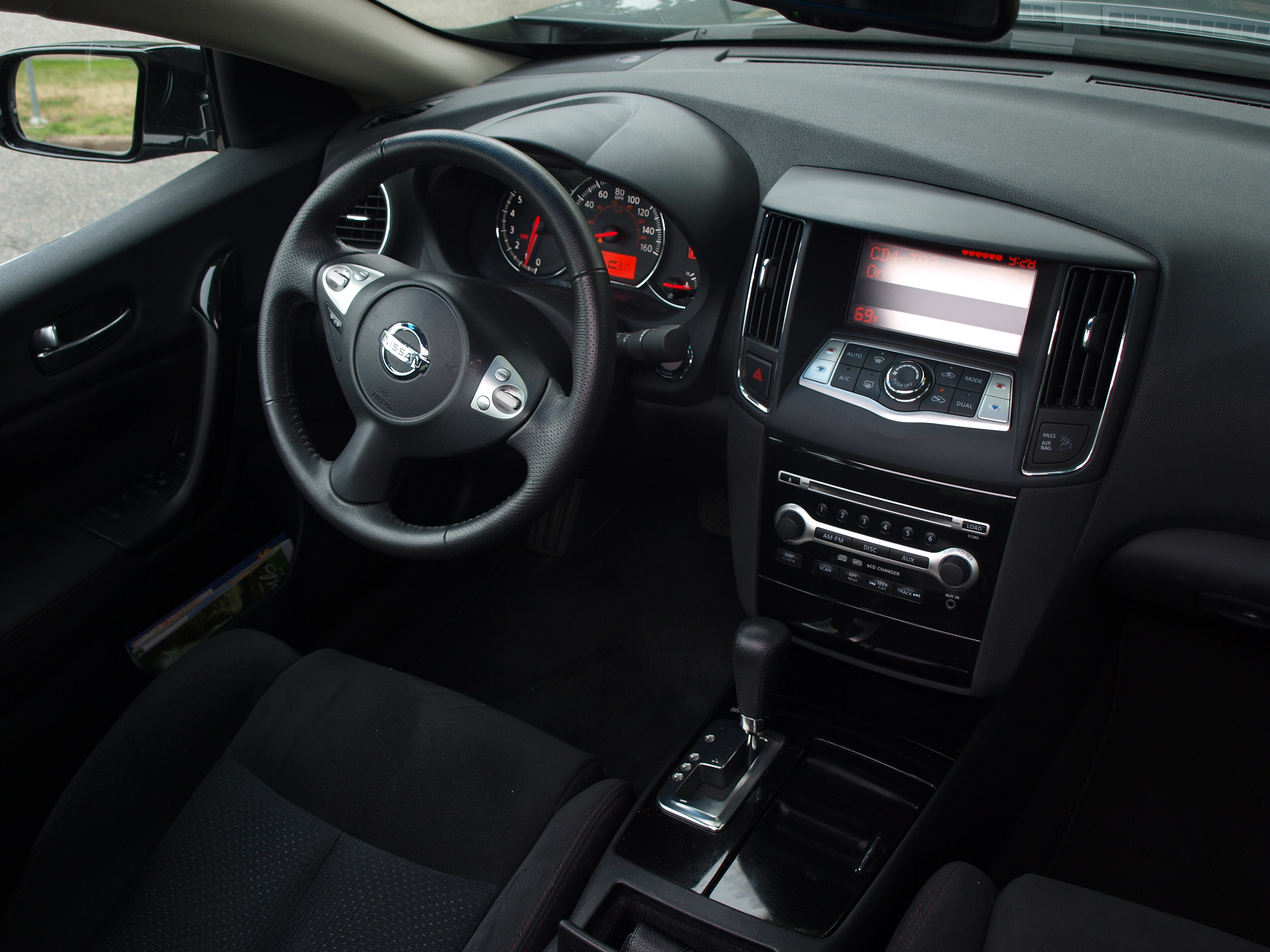
Interior

Nissan presented the redesigned Maxima for model year 2009 at the 2008 New York International Auto Show. The seventh-generation Maxima (A35) uses the Nissan D platform shared with the fourth-generation Nissan Altima and second-generation Nissan Murano. It serves as Nissan's North American top front-wheel-drive sedan.

The A35 featured a revised version of the VQ35DE engine producing 290 hp (216 kW) and 261 lb⋅ft (354 N⋅m) of torque. A revised version of Nissan's Xtronic CVT (continuously variable transmission) with paddle shifting was the only transmission offered, with no manual or regular automatic available. A diesel version was expected to be released for the 2010 model year, although those plans were not realized. The new Maxima was offered in S and SV trims with several premium and technology packages available. The Maxima's design traded height and length for a sleeker styling, although the width was increased slightly. The keyless ignition uses a push button to start and stop the engine. In the US, the seventh generation Maxima went on sale in late June 2008. The SkyView center glass was replaced by a retractable panoramic moonroof for A35 series Maxima.

Performance:

- 0–60 mph: 5.8 sec.
- Skid Pad Lateral acceleration: 0.85 g
- 1/4 Mile: 14.5 sec. at 99 mph (159 km/h)
- 60–0 mph: 128 feet (39 m)

=== Model year changes ===
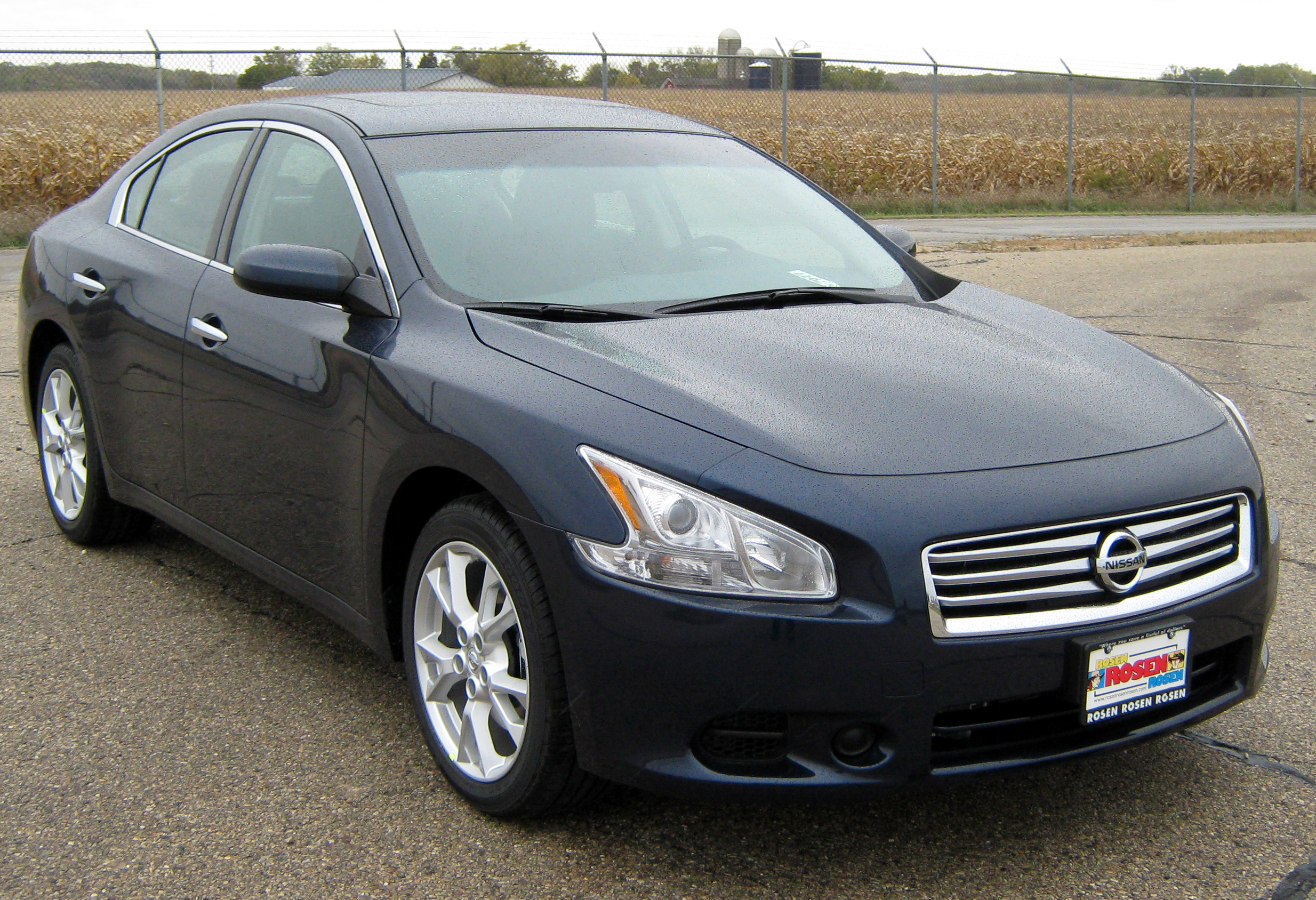
2012 Nissan Maxima S

2012

For 2012, Nissan modestly freshened the Maxima's exterior, with a new grille, taillights and new alloy wheels in 18- and 19-inch diameters. Three new exterior colors, Java Metallic, Dark Slate, and Pearl White are available.

The cabin received a few small trim changes, but was mostly carried over from 2011. A new Limited Edition package on the Maxima 3.5 S featured smoked xenon headlights, a compass in the rearview mirror, 18-inch dark-silver-finish alloy wheels, rear spoiler, dark satin chrome grille, foglights, outside mirrors with integrated turn signals and metallic trim.

2013

The 2013 Nissan Maxima still remained the same for the most part and was available with three new option packages for the new model year. There was the Bose Audio Package, a Bose audio upgrade with SiriusXM Satellite Radio functionality. The "SV Value Package" includes the premium Bose audio setup along with heated front seats, a heated steering wheel and heated outside mirrors. The Sport Package included alloy wheels and a climate-controlled driver's seat, combined with the Maxima Monitor Package (a rearview camera system, seven-inch color monitor, USB port and an iPod storage net).

2014

Nissan's flagship Maxima sedan entered the 2014 model year in late August 2013 with the addition of a new S Value Package. This has smoked appearance HID Xenon headlights, a compass in the rearview mirror, rear spoiler, fog lights, outside mirrors with integrated turn signals and metallic trim treatment. The Monitor and HID Xenon Packages were no longer available, while the SV received most of the Monitor package as standard. There were two new exterior colors: Gun Metallic (replaces Dark Gray) and Midnight Garnet (replaces Tuscan Sun); for eight available exterior colors total. The 3.5 S and 3.5 SV were the available models, each powered by a 290 hp (216 kW) 3.5-liter V6 engine mated to an Xtronic CVT. 2014 was the last year for this generation Nissan Maxima despite it carrying over into 2015 as a 2014 model year. Nissan stated "they will have plenty 2014 Nissan Maximas on dealer lots until the all-new 2016 Nissan Maxima arrives" in calendar year 2015.

== Eighth generation (2016) ==
Nissan Maxima
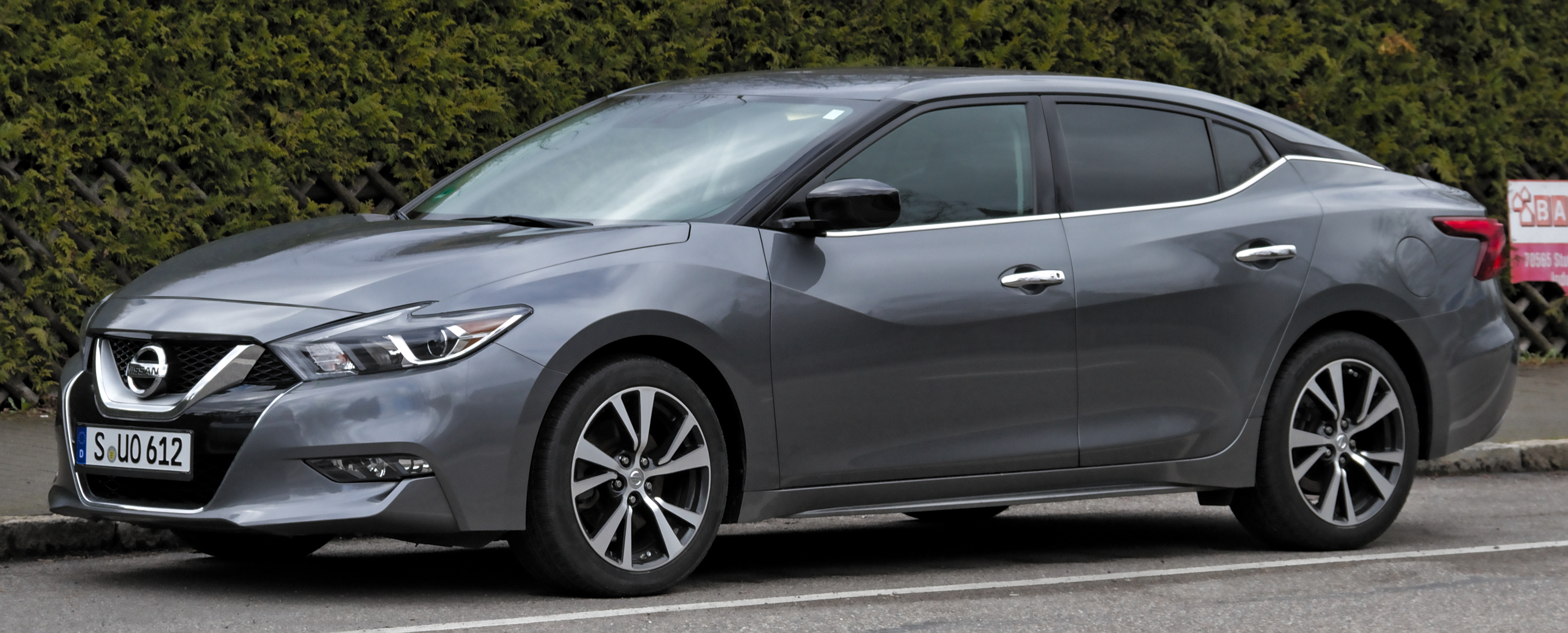

Overview
- Model code: A36
- Production: April 2015–July 2023
- Model years: 2016–2023
- Assembly: United States: Smyrna, Tennessee (Nissan Smyrna assembly plant); China: Xiangyang (DMCL) (Until 2019)
- Designer: Giovanny Arroba (exterior); Jackie Chang (interior)

Body and chassis
- Class: Full-size car
- Body style: 4-door sedan
- Layout: Front-engine, front-wheel-drive
- Platform: Nissan D platform
- Related: Nissan Altima/Teana (L33)

Powertrain
- Engine: Gasoline: 2.5 L QR25DE I4 (China); 3.5 L VQ35DE V6
- Transmission: CVT

Dimensions
- Wheelbase: 109.3 in (2,776 mm)
- Length: 192.8 in (4,897 mm)
- Width: 73.2 in (1,859 mm)
- Height: 56.5 in (1,435 mm)
- Curb weight: 3,471–3,488 lb (1,574–1,582 kg)

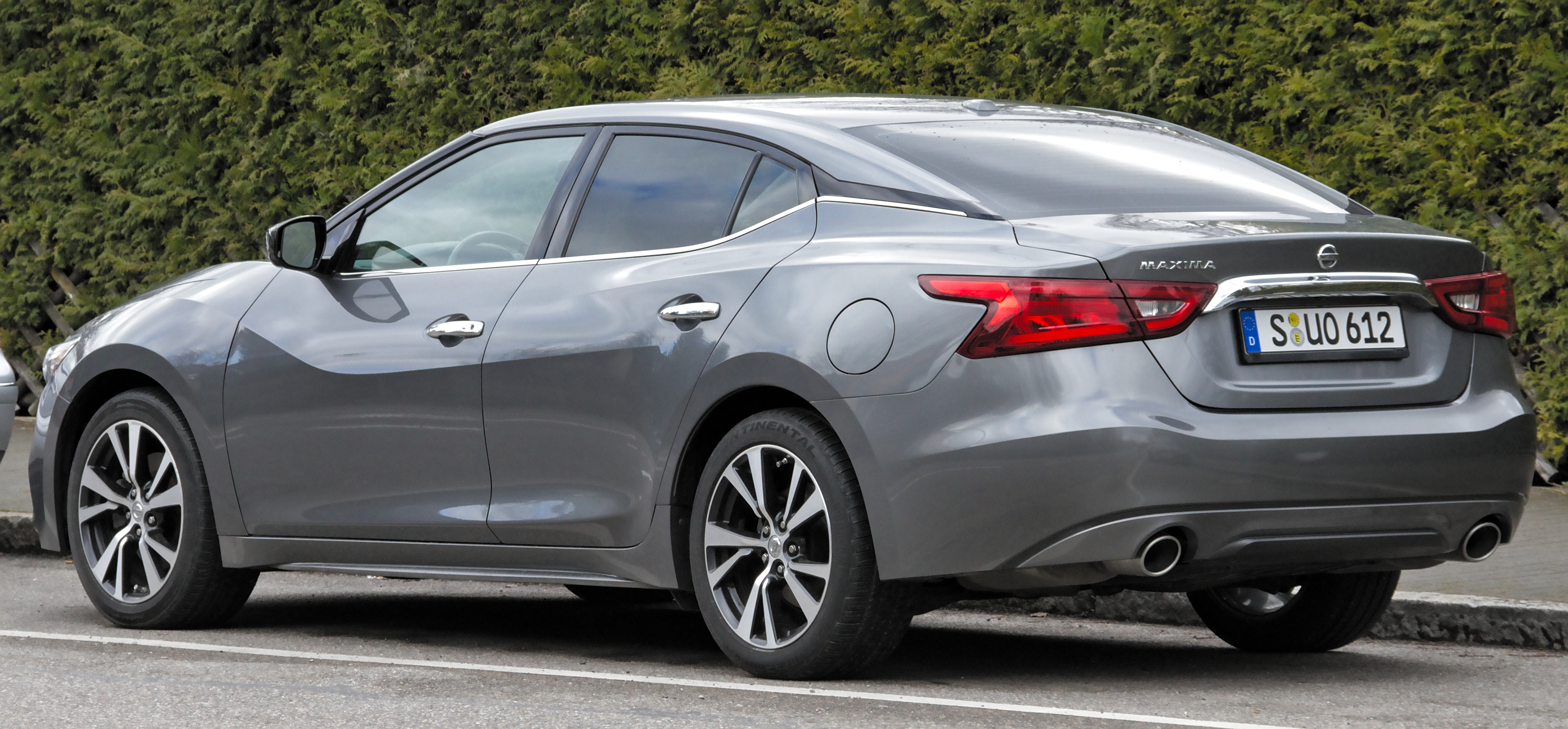
Pre-facelift

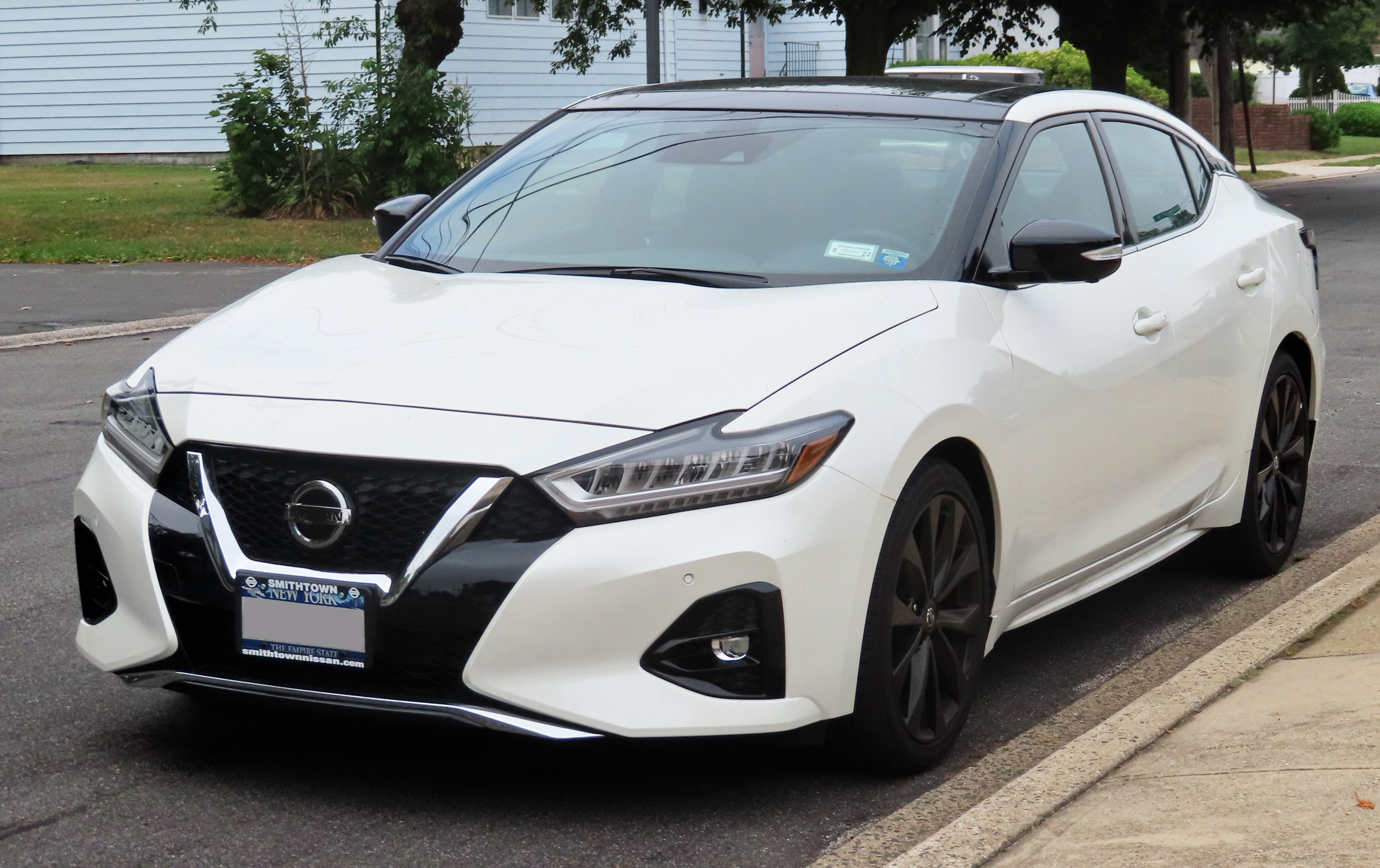

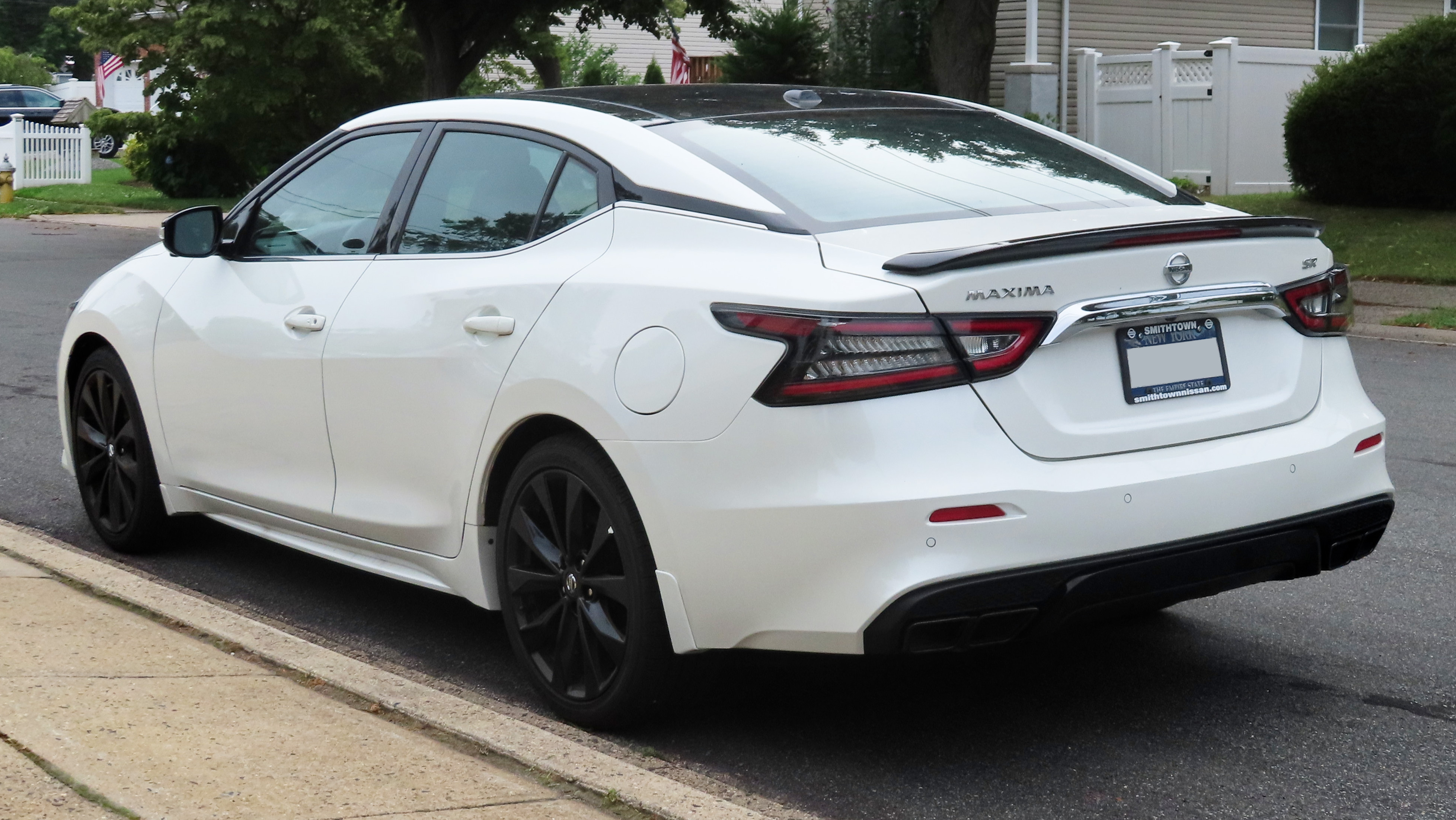
Facelift

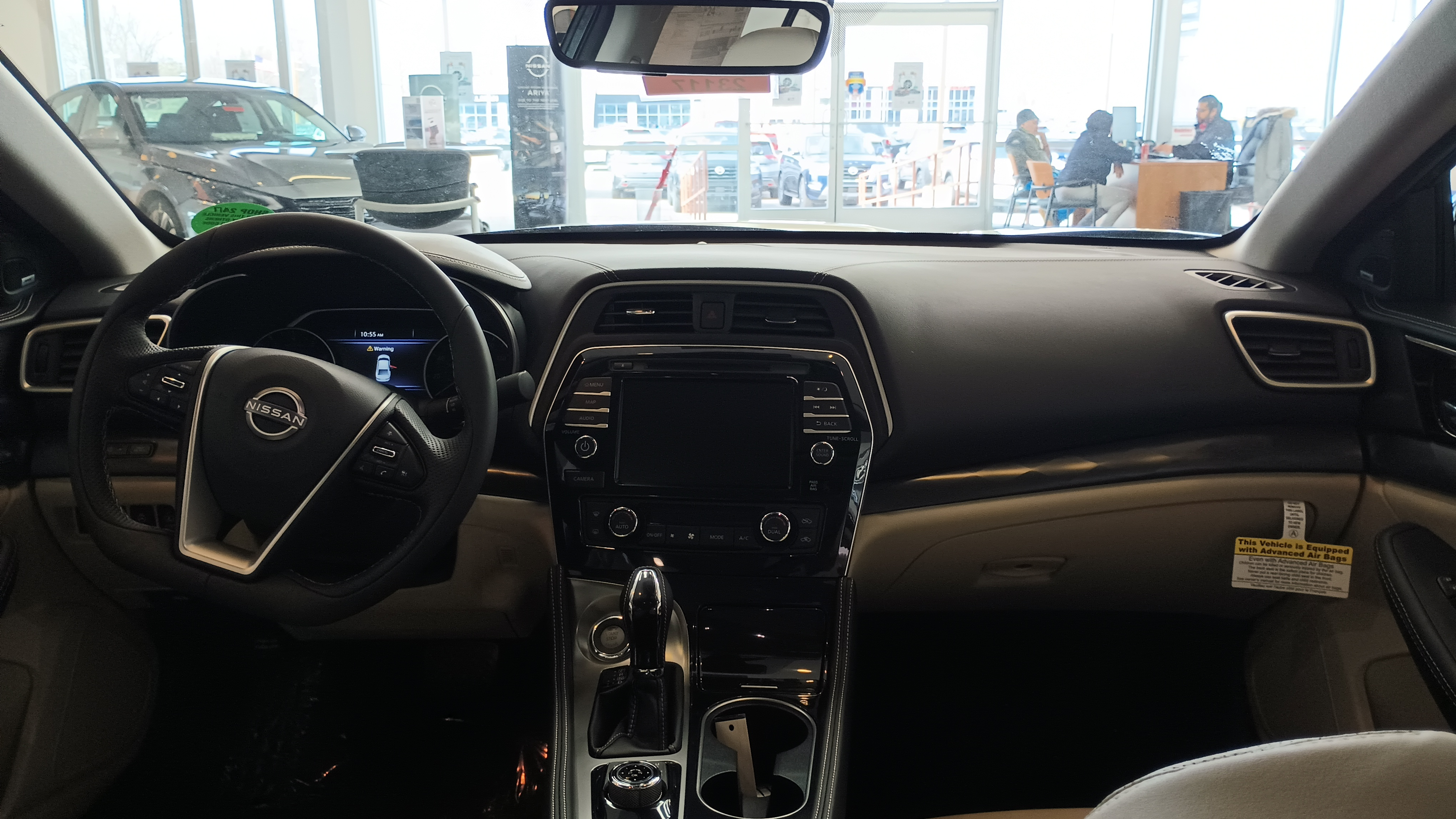
Interior

The eighth-generation Maxima was unveiled at the 2015 New York International Auto Show as a 2016 model for North America, skipping the 2015 model year. Sporting an athletic body redesign, Nissan calls it a "four-door sports car", a marketing term first used on the third-generation J30 series (1988–1992). The Nissan Sport Sedan Concept shown in the 2014 Detroit Auto Show previewed the exterior design of the vehicle. The vehicle was 82 lb (37 kg) lighter than before, with a revamped interior taking inspiration from aerospace. The VQ35DE engine was carried over with minor updates and 10 hp (7.5 kW) more power, uprated at 300 hp (224 kW) and 261 lb⋅ft (354 N⋅m) of torque. The Maxima was available with six exterior color options and three trim levels: SV, SR, and Platinum. There was also an SR Midnight Edition that was introduced in 2016. The Midnight Edition blacked out most chrome (Grille, rims, rear chrome, exhaust tips, etc.) and added a more sporty appearance to the Maxima. The Midnight Edition was discontinued after the 2018 model year. For the 2021 model year, a 40th Anniversary edition was available with unique Ruby Slate Grey Pearl paint, black exterior & interior trim, black wheels, 40th Anniversary floor mats & exterior badge and a unique white face gauge cluster.

This generation Maxima made its debut in China at the 2015 Guangzhou Auto Show with the Chinese name 西玛, which they used as the previous generation Nissan Cima.

An updated Maxima was revealed at the 2018 LA Auto Show and released later that year.

The Maxima for Mexico received a facelift on July 9, 2019. It was offered in the Advance, SR, and Exclusive trim lines.

The Nissan Maxima was discontinued from the Mexican market after the 2020 model year. For the US and Canada, Nissan ended production of the Maxima in 2023. The Maxima name was planned to be used on a future electric sedan, which was also intended to receive an Infiniti counterpart. However, in 2025, Nissan scrapped plans to develop two electric sedans for the US, citing the declining sedan market, thus ending speculation of the return of the Maxima name.

Performance:

- 0–60 mph (97 km/h): 5.9 sec.
- Skid Pad Lateral acceleration: 0.87 g
- 1/4 Mile: 14.4 sec. at 101 mph (163 km/h)
- Stopping distance from 70 mph (113 km/h): 168 feet (51.2 m)

== Sales ==
Calendar year	U.S.	Canada
1982	54,187	
1983	76,209	
1984	68,209	
1985	99,051	
1986	112,755	
1987	93,269	
1988	74,451	
1989	109,429	
1990	100,067	
1991	99,026	
1992	84,593	
1993	87,602	
1994	163,138	
1995	128,599	
1996	128,395	
1997	123,215	
1998	113,843	
1999	131,182	
2000	129,235	
2001	102,535	
2002	98,502	
2003	86,758	
2004	76,367	
2005	75,425	3,159
2006	69,763	2,940
2007	52,574	1,304
2008	47,072	1,475
2009	53,351	1,642
2010	60,569	2,266
2011	58,737	2,069
2012	59,349	2,025
2013	53,896	1,500
2014	50,401	968
2015	40,359	1,706
2016	62,670	2,297
2017	67,627	2,210
2018	42,337	1,357
2019	35,076	971
2020	18,062	851
2021	16,386	487
2022	7,110	406
2023	9,653	706
2024	942	83

== Other uses of Maxima name ==
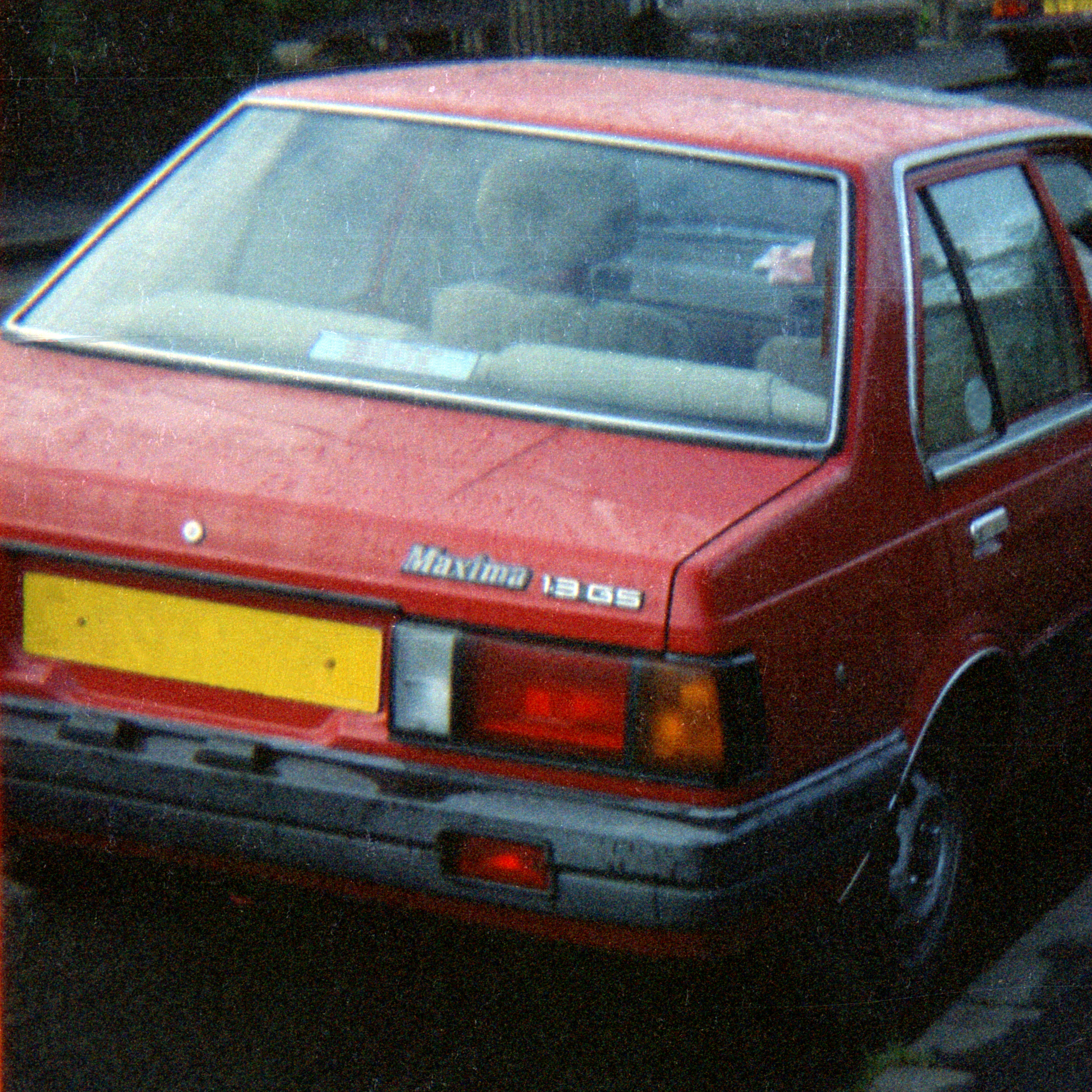
UK-market B11 Nissan Sunny 1.3 GS with "Maxima" trim designation visible

The first use of the "Maxima" badge was in August 1977, as the top equipment level on the Japanese domestic market Nissan Stanza (A10). It has been used intermittently in the Japanese domestic market since then, also on a luxury, hardtop version of the Bluebird.

In the United Kingdom, the "Maxima" name was also used in the mid-1980s as a high series trim designation on the B11 Sunny, N12 Cherry and the Japanese built versions of the T12 Bluebird/Stanza. In the Philippines, the T12 Nissan Auster was sold as the Maxima.

In other markets outside North America, the Maxima J30 series sold internationally between 1990 and 1994, albeit with different frontal styling to the North American version. Between 1994 and 2003, the "Maxima" name was applied to the Nissan Cefiro sold in Australasia, Europe, and South America. From 2003 until 2013, Nissan in Australasia also retailed the Teana under the Maxima badge.

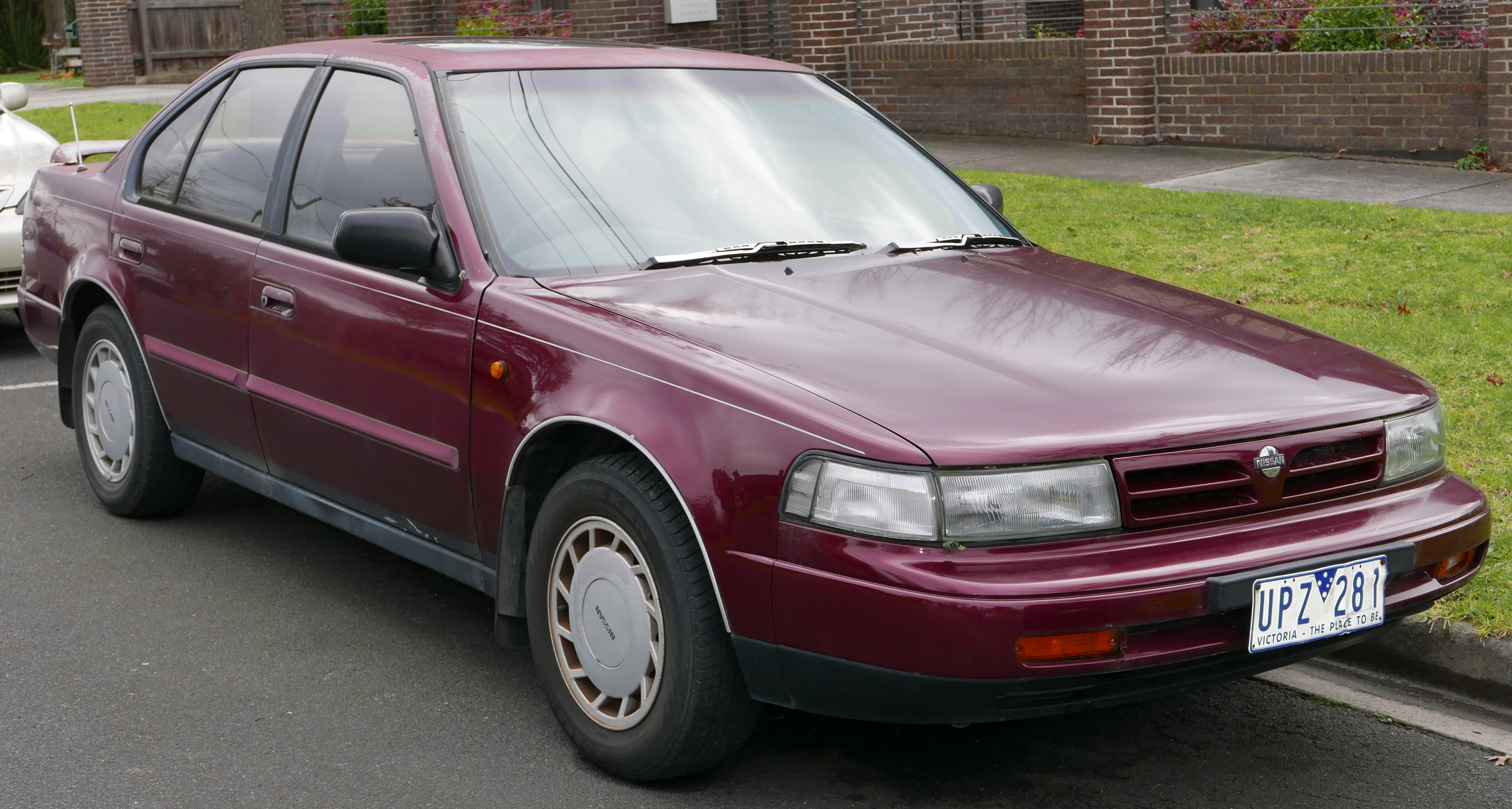
J30 (1990–1994)
(sold worldwide)

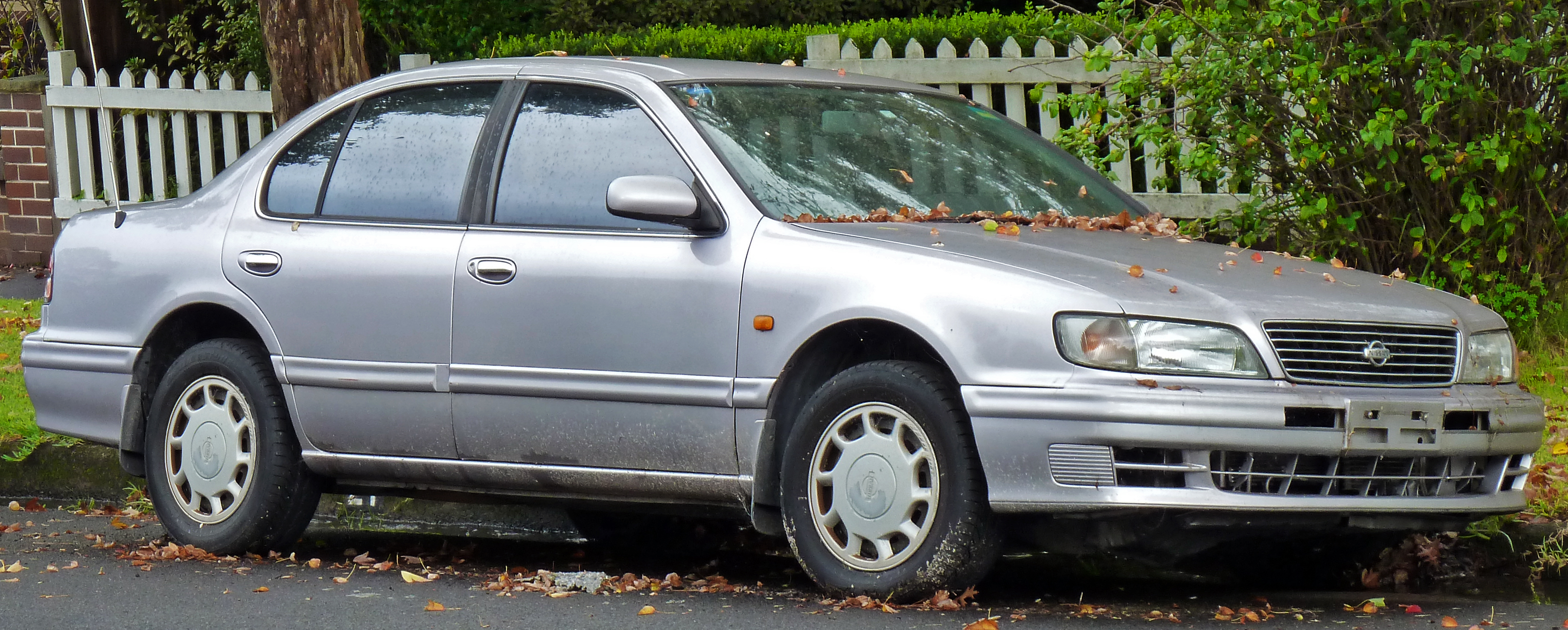
A32 (1994–1999)
(Australasia, Europe, South America)

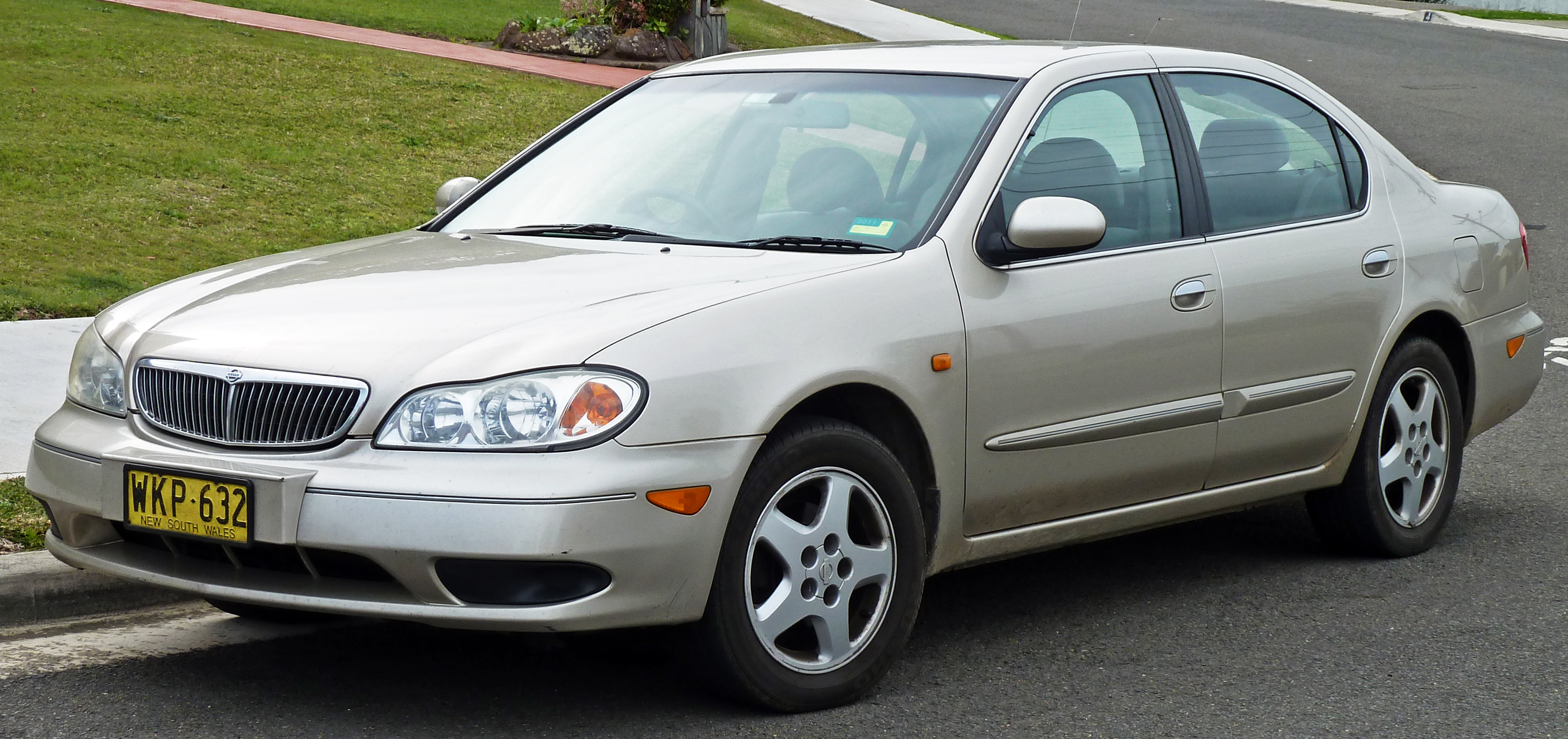
A33 (1999–2003)
(Middle East, Australasia, Europe, South America, Iran)

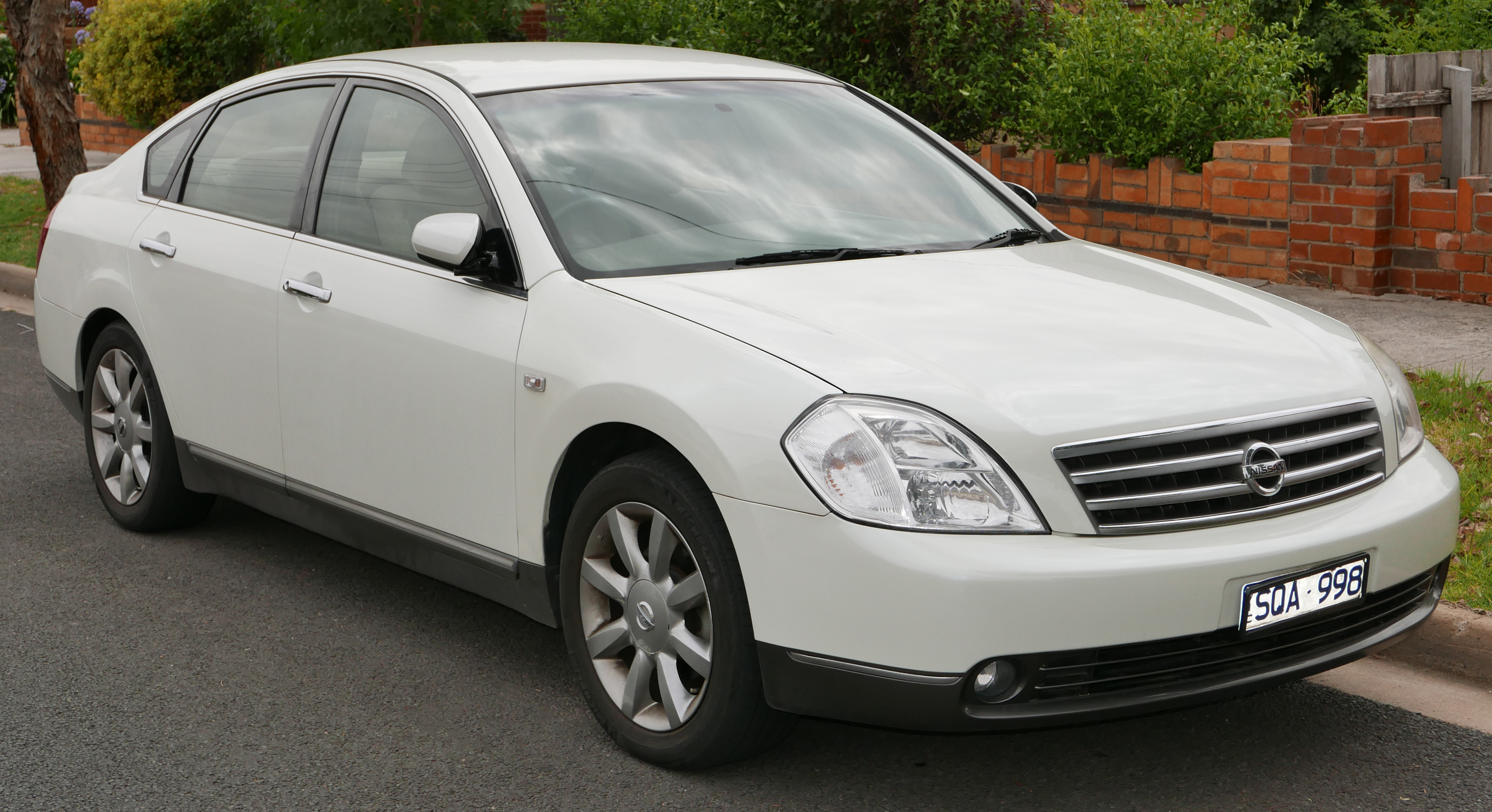
J31 (2003–2009)
(Australasia)

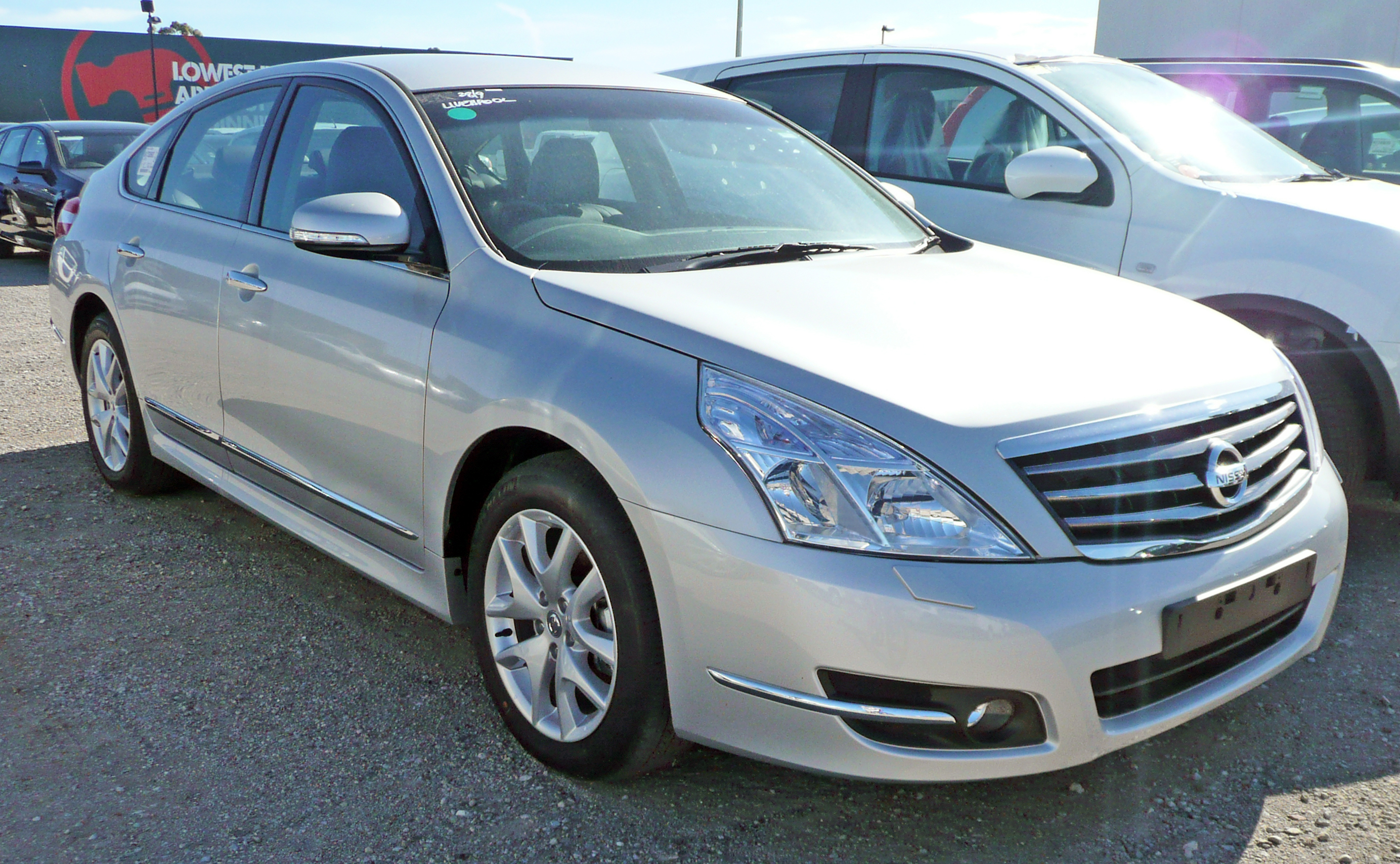
J32 (2009–2013)
(Australasia)
