= Ford VX54 platform =

The Ford VX54 platform was a mid-size minivan platform developed by a joint venture with American automaker, Ford Motor Company and Japanese automaker, Nissan Motors. The platform was specifically developed in 1993 for production of the Mercury Villager and Nissan Quest. The goal was to market a smaller and more stylish minivan that was comfortable and more family-oriented. The minivans were designed to be in between the sizes of Chrysler's Dodge Caravan and Dodge Grand Caravan. It is a modified version of the J30 Nissan Maxima platform.

== Overview and History ==
Both minivans continued to be built on the platform until 2002 when Ford discontinued the Villager due to sagging sales. Though sales of the Nissan version were declining due to customers' preference of larger minivans such as the Honda Odyssey and Toyota Sienna, Nissan continued to use the Quest nameplate on a new and slightly larger minivan based on the Nissan FF-L platform.

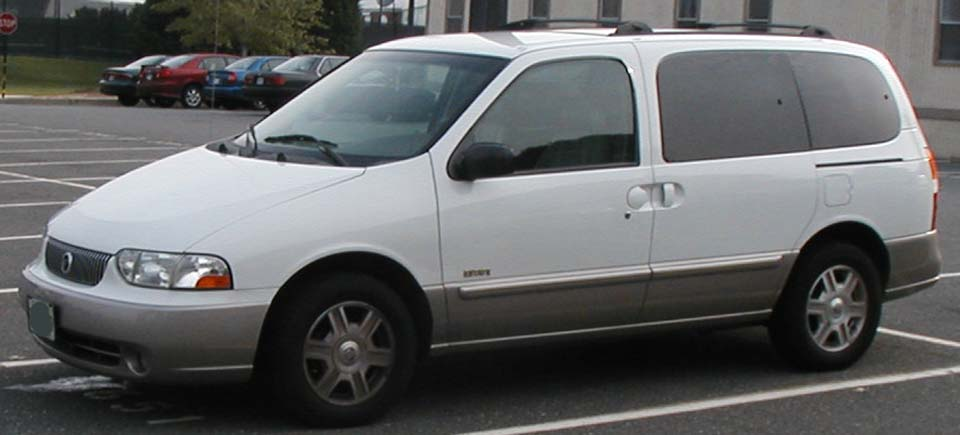
The last Mercury Villager produced was one similar to this 2002 model

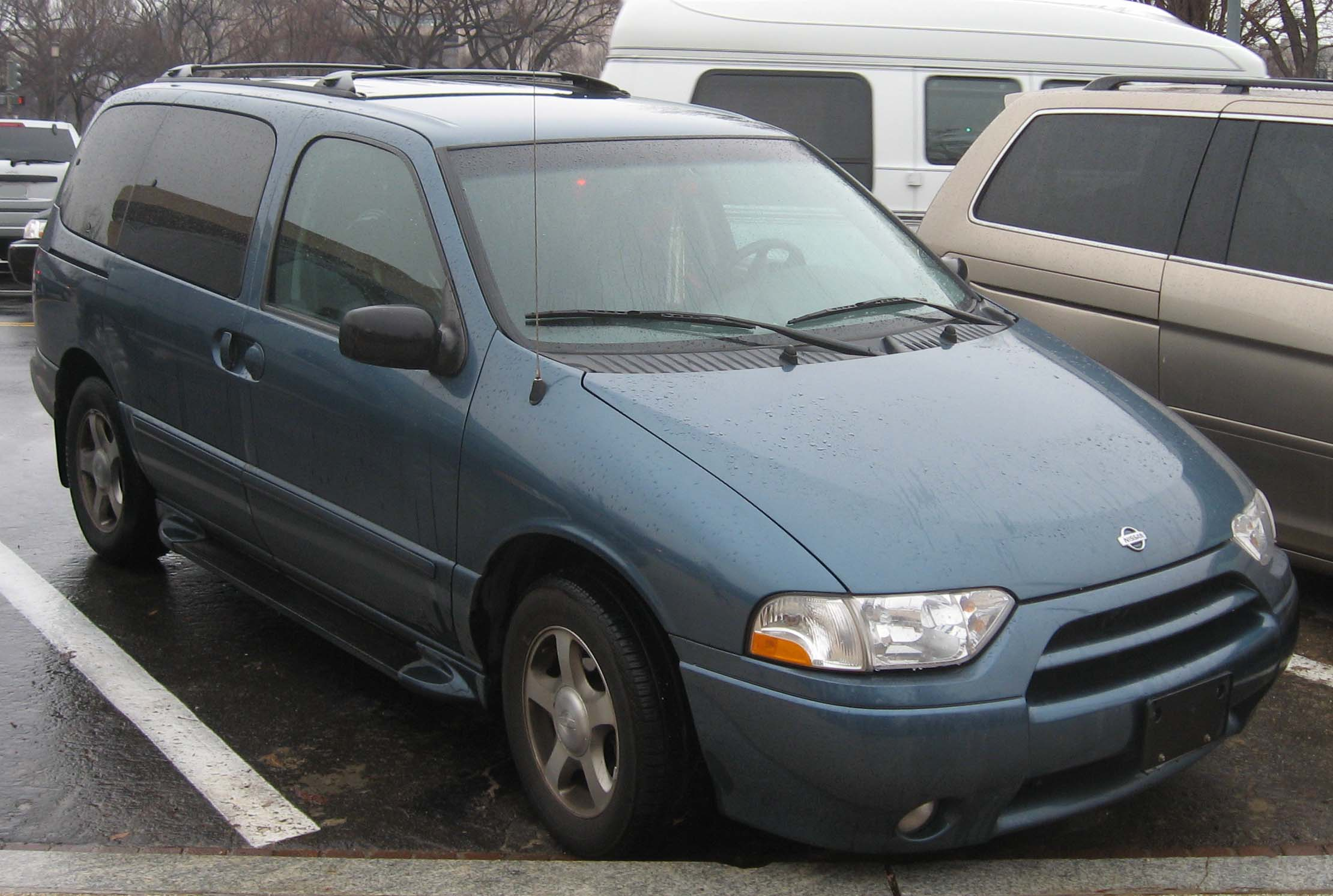
The first and second generation Nissan Quest was built on the Ford VX54 platform
