= Nissan Quest =

Minivan by Nissan (1993–2017)

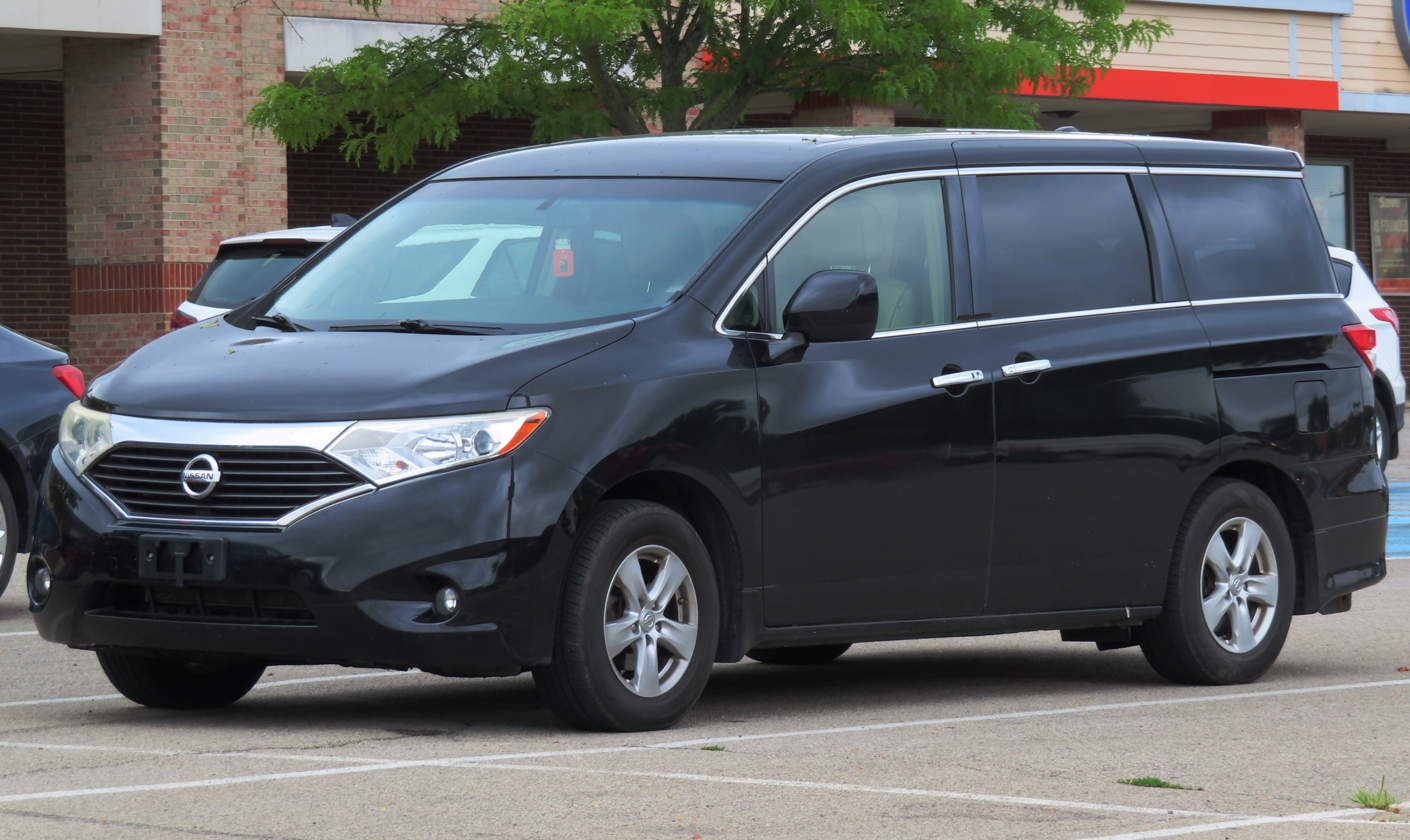
- 2015 Nissan Quest SV (RE52)

Overview
- Manufacturer: Ford Motor Company (1993–2002); Nissan (2004–2009, 2011–2017)
- Production: 1992–2016
- Model years: 1993–2002; 2004–2009; 2011–2017

Body and chassis
- Class: Minivan

Chronology
- Predecessor: Nissan Van; Nissan Axxess
- Successor: Nissan Elgrand

The Nissan Quest is a minivan that was marketed by Nissan from the 1993 to 2017 model years. The successor for the Japanese-designed Nissan Van and Nissan Axxess, the Quest was the first Japanese-brand minivan developed specifically for the North American market. In a joint venture with Ford Motor Company, the Quest was manufactured alongside the Mercury Villager (the first Mercury-brand minivan)

For its first two generations (under the Nissan-Ford joint venture), the Quest shared the Ford VX54 platform with the Villager, with Nissan contributing the powertrain for both vehicles (derived from the Nissan Maxima); the Quest/Villager shared design commonality with neither the Ford Aerostar nor the Ford Windstar.

For the third generation (during which the joint venture was ended), Nissan moved to the Nissan FF-L platform, growing in size and adopting chassis commonality with the Maxima. For its fourth generation, the Quest moved to the Nissan D platform, becoming a widened variant of the Nissan Elgrand minivan developed specifically for the United States and China.

Under the Nissan-Ford joint venture, the first two generations of the Quest were manufactured by Ford at its Ohio Assembly facility (Avon Lake, Ohio). The third generation was manufactured entirely by Nissan, who assembled the vehicle at its Canton, Mississippi facility. For the final generation, the Quest was assembled alongside the Elgrand at Nissan Shatai (Kanda, Fukuoka). Following the decline of minivan sales in North America, Nissan ended sales of the Quest after the 2017 model year.

== Background ==
In 1987, Ford and Nissan entered a joint agreement to develop an all-new vehicle to compete in the minivan segment scheduled for 1991. While Ford was on the verge of commencing development of a front-wheel drive minivan (which ultimately became the Ford Windstar), the agreement allowed for a large degree of cost-sharing between two manufacturers in an effort to fill a mutual gap in their product lines. Ford had no minivan for its Mercury division and Nissan was struggling to adapt its compact vehicles for the American market.

Development officially began later that year under the codename VX54, with the final designs being chosen in 1989. The shared model line was designed by Nissan Design International in La Jolla, California (later Nissan Design America). As Ford proceeded with its Aerostar replacement, its version was to be sold through the Mercury division (whose Tracer subcompact was assembled by Mazda). For Nissan, the joint venture was a project to expand American-sourced content for its American-assembled vehicles; launching with 140 new suppliers, the domestic parts content was initially 75% (intending to increase to 90%).

Prototypes went into initial testing in 1990 at Ford and Nissan test tracks, later real-world testing throughout 1991, with development concluding at the end of that year.

Under the joint venture, Nissan would contribute the powertrain and major body stampings (through its Nissan Smyrna (NMMC) plant), shipping the components to Ford for final assembly at Ohio Assembly. The first Nissan Quest rolled off the production line on April 14, 1992, at the Avon, Ohio plant. Parts content was initially sourced from Japan to accommodate the launch of NMMC assembly, which began in June 1992 on the main body stampings, with engine assembly beginning in August 1992.

== First generation (V40; 1993) ==
First generation
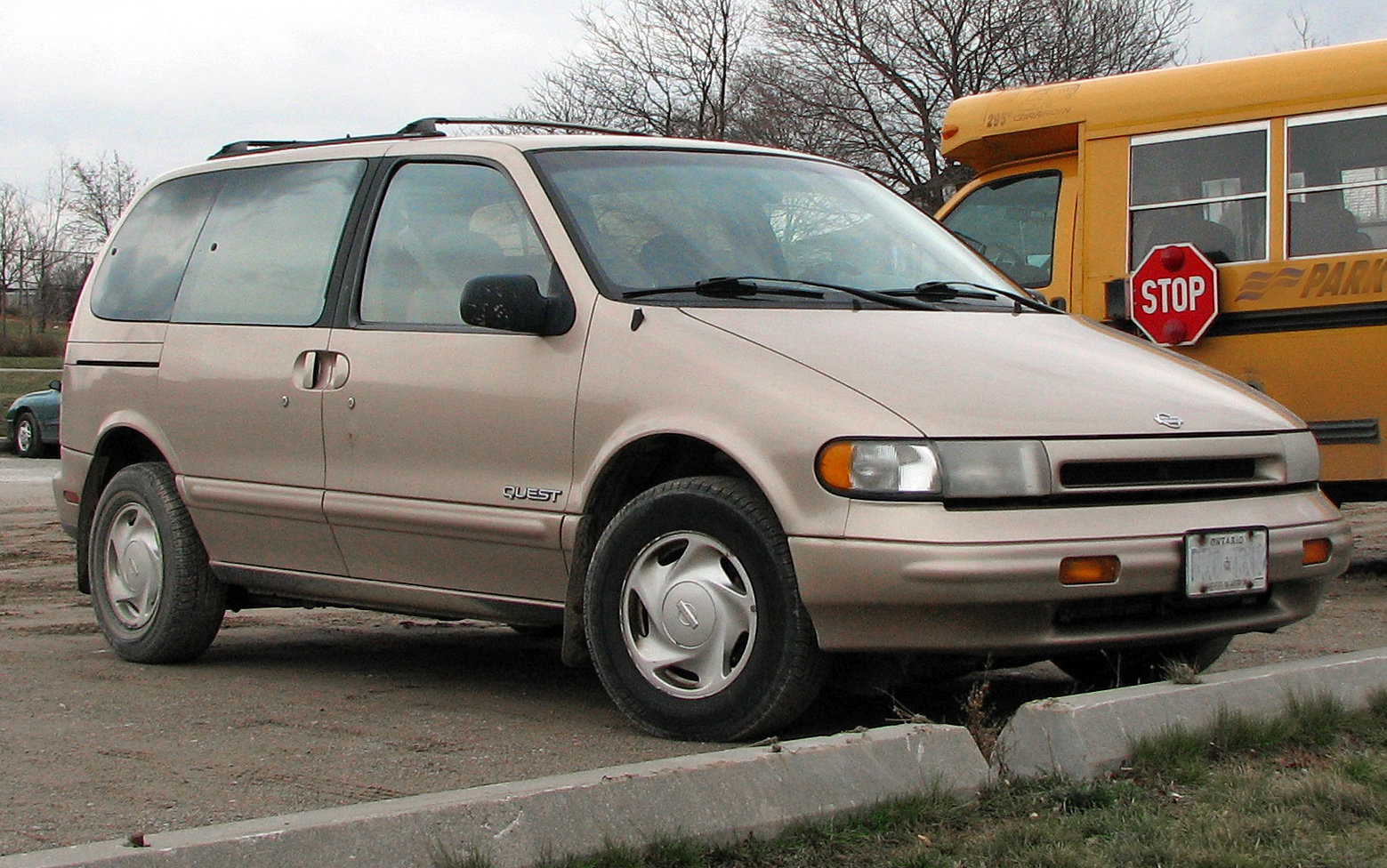
- 1993 Nissan Quest GXE

Overview
- Manufacturer: Ford
- Model code: V40
- Also called: Mercury Villager; Gaodeng Nissan Quest GDK6480 (China); Guangdong Nissan Quest (China); Sauber Villager (Austria)
- Production: April 1992 – July 1998
- Model years: 1993–1998
- Assembly: United States: Avon Lake, Ohio (Ohio Assembly); China: Guangdong (CKD)
- Designer: Tom Semple (1989)

Body and chassis
- Body style: 4-door minivan
- Platform: Ford VX54 platform
- Related: Nissan Maxima (J30)

Powertrain
- Engine: 3.0 L VG30E V6
- Transmission: 4-speed automatic

Dimensions
- Wheelbase: 112.2 in (2,850 mm)
- Length: 189.9 in (4,823 mm)
- Width: 73.7 in (1,872 mm)
- Height: 67.5 in (1,714 mm) (Cargo); 65.6 in (1,666 mm) (1993-95 XE); 68 in (1,727 mm) (GXE & 1996-98 XE)

The Nissan Quest was introduced at the 1992 Detroit Auto Show as a 1993 model. Unusually, the design patents for the model line were filed by Nissan design chief Thomas H. Semple on March 5, 1992 (two months after its introduction). Prior to the launch of the model line, Nissan had sold two domestically-designed minivans in the United States: the 1987–1990 Nissan Van and the 1990-only Nissan Axxess (1990–1995 in Canada). Launched in mid-August 1992, Nissan would sell 1,358 examples during its first full month on the market.

For a short time, the Quest was sold in Japan at Nissan Bluebird Store locations, retaining its left-hand drive configuration, but sales were limited and cancelled after the facelifted version was released in 1996.

In line with Ford using the Taurus model line to develop its Aerostar replacement (originally speculated as a redesigned version), the Nissan-Ford joint venture was adapted from the Nissan Maxima midsize sedan (a model line which had dropped its station wagon for 1989). Though officially designated the Ford VX54 platform, the model line was assigned the V40 chassis code by Nissan. Along with using front-wheel drive, the VX54 chassis benchmarked the Chrysler minivans, using a nearly identical 112.2 inch wheelbase (0.1 inch shorter than the standard-wheelbase Voyager/Caravan), and similar suspension configuration (front MacPherson struts, leaf-sprung beam axle). However, the Quest was nearly 12 inches longer (approximately 1 inch longer than the extended-length Aerostar).

Both the Quest and the Villager were powered by the Nissan VG30E 3.0 L V6, producing 151 hp (113 kW) and 182 lb⋅ft (247 N⋅m) torque. Before they agreed to utilize the engine in the joint venture, Ford requested Nissan make several design changes to the VG30E. Along with the addition of an oil level sensor and the relocation of the oil filter assembly (for improved access), Ford requested that the engine become a non-interference design: if the timing belt were to fail, the pistons would not be able to contact any open valves in the cylinders (preventing catastrophic engine failure). The V6 engine was paired to a 4-speed automatic transmission, also sourced from the Maxima.

In following with other Nissan lines, the Quest was marketed in a standard XE trim and a deluxe GXE trim.

While the Quest shared essentially its entire body with the Mercury Villager, several details differentiated the two model lines. In place of the Mercury lightbar grille (though the headlamp clusters were shared), the Quest was fitted with a single-slot body-color grille (in the style of the 1992 Altima); the front bumper was designed with different air intakes than the Villager. The rear liftgate was styled differently between the two models; along with Nissan not using red trim between the taillamps, the reverse lights were mounted slightly lower (bordering the license plate). On the standard Quest XE trim, the exterior was monochromatic (contrasting with the gray body moldings of the Villager GS); in reverse of the Villager LS, the deluxe Quest GXE came with a monochromatic exterior and optional two-tone paint. The interior design was shared between the two model lines. To reduce production costs, many interior parts were sourced from Ford, with both models sharing the same dashboard (including the radio, heater controls, and power window and lock switches; the Quest also shared its instrument panel with the Villager. For 1994, a driver-side airbag was introduced, as both model lines sourced the steering wheel from the Nissan Altima (replacing the previous Maxima-sourced wheel).

=== 1996 model update ===
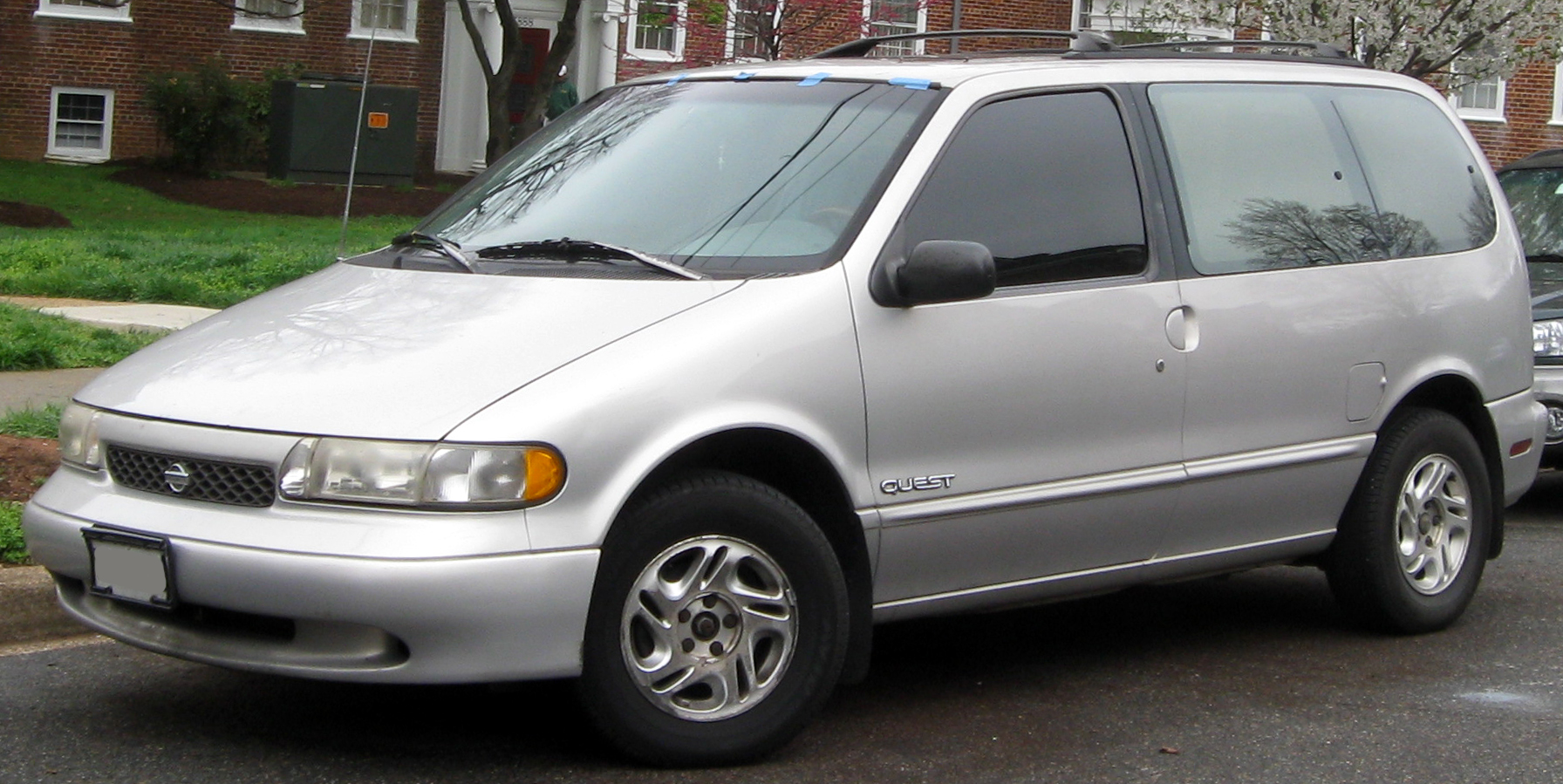
1996–1998 Nissan Quest (facelift version)

For 1996, the Quest underwent a mid-cycle model update. While the powertrain remained unchanged, the body saw several exterior changes, with the grille reflecting the redesign of the Maxima and a larger lower grille intake; taillamps were no longer monochromatic.

To accommodate the adoption of dual airbags, several changes were made to the interior. The glovebox was relocated to knee level, as the passenger airbag eliminated its high-mounted location. While the instrument cluster was carried over, the center of the dashboard was redesigned to adopt new climate controls and a double-DIN radio unit (both sourced from Ford). In a change welcomed by consumers, 3-point seatbelts were added to the front seats (as dual airbags negated the requirement of motorized shoulder belts).

=== Seating configuration ===
The Nissan Quest and Mercury Villager were both 7-passenger vehicles, with the seating configuration dependent on trim. The base XE trim was offered with a 2-passenger middle bench seat; the upgraded GXE trim was offered with either a middle bench seat or optional twin bucket seats. In a segment innovation, the third-row bench seat was placed on tracks; if the second row of seats was removed, it could be folded up and slid against the front seats to maximize cargo space. As an alternative, seatbacks were able to be folded flat (with each seatback also configured as a tabletop).

While largely intended to remain as a permanent part of the vehicle, the third-row seat was removable (involving the use of tools). While reducing the necessity of removing and storing rear seats, the system was not adopted by other manufacturers as simpler alternatives became available.

== Second generation (V41; 1999) ==
Second generation
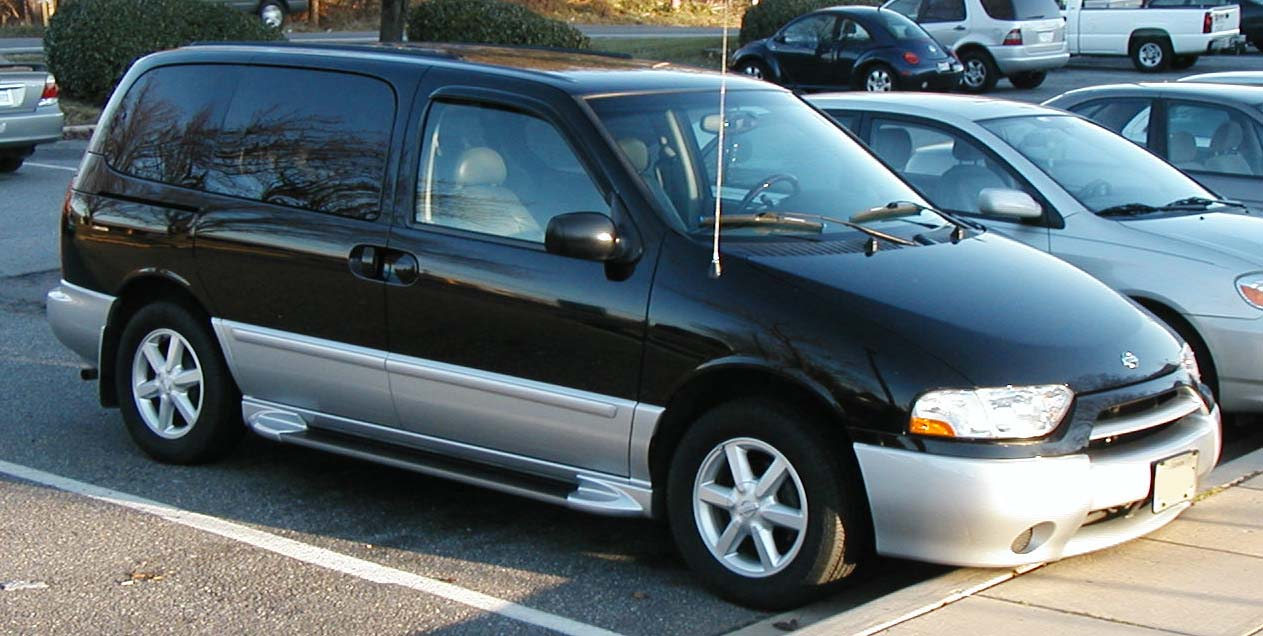
- 2002 Nissan Quest GLE

Overview
- Manufacturer: Ford
- Model code: V41
- Also called: Mercury Villager
- Production: August 1998 – June 2002
- Model years: 1999–2002
- Assembly: United States: Avon Lake, Ohio (Ohio Assembly)
- Designer: Shinken Tanaka (Exterior: 1995); Diane Allen (chief designer)

Body and chassis
- Body style: 5-door minivan
- Platform: Ford VX54 platform
- Related: Nissan Maxima (J30)

Powertrain
- Engine: 3.3 L VG33E V6
- Transmission: 4-speed automatic

Dimensions
- Wheelbase: 112.2 in (2,850 mm)
- Length: 194.6 in (4,943 mm) (2001-02); 194.8 in (4,948 mm) (1999–2000)
- Width: 74.9 in (1,902 mm)
- Height: 64.2 in (1,631 mm); 67.3 in (1,709 mm)

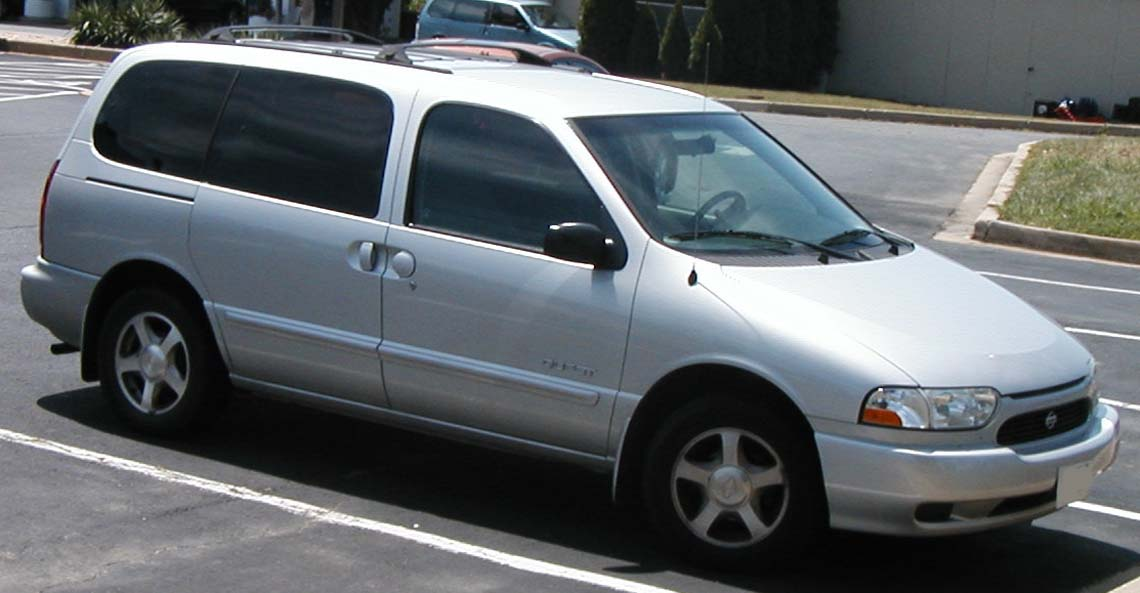
1999-2000 Nissan Quest SE/GLE (pre-facelift)

The second-generation Nissan Quest was released for the 1999 model year, again serving as the design counterpart of the Mercury Villager. Intended as a substantial evolution of the first generation, the 1999 model again shared the VX54 chassis on an unchanged 112.2-inch wheelbase, though growing an inch wider and nearly 5 inches longer. Dual sliding doors made their return (last seen on the 1990 Axxess), becoming a standard feature (making it the first model line in the segment to adopt them entirely, preceding the Honda Odyssey by one month).

The Nissan-Ford joint venture that produced the vehicles remained the same. The major body stampings and drivetrain components were built by Nissan and shipped to Ford (who supplied multiple secondary components) for final assembly. Internally designated V41, the second generation was developed by Nissan Design America between 1993 and 1995. In addition to giving the model line an updated design, Nissan sought to build on the car-like handling of the model line; following its 1993 introduction, the Quest had become one of the smaller vehicles in its segment. Nissan again supplied the powertrain, switching to the 3.3 L VG33E V6 (shared with the Nissan Pathfinder and Frontier), increasing output by 20 hp.

Though every external body panel was changed, the exterior saw an evolutionary update to its styling; along with the introduction of a driver-side sliding door, the B-pillar became body-colored. The XE trim was discontinued and replaced by the GXE as the base model (adopting its two-passenger bench seat). Two new trim levels were added, the sport-oriented SE (cloth or leather interior) or luxury GLE (leather interior). The interior (again shared with the Villager) took on a much sportier appearance with the dashboard design with Ford-sourced switches and controls (as before, the Quest was not offered with the optional digital instrument panel used by the Villager). The third-row sliding bench seat made its return; to add cargo space behind the rear seat, a removable parcel shelf was added, effectively creating two-tier storage.

For 2000, minor functional changes were made to the model line. The GLE adopted the rear stabilizer bar of the sportier SE, while the interior saw minor trim upgrades. On non-GXE trims, an optional rear-seat video entertainment system (fitted between the front seats).

During 2000, Ford and Nissan chose to wind down their production agreement, with the second-generation Quest/Villager being replaced separately.

=== 2001 update ===
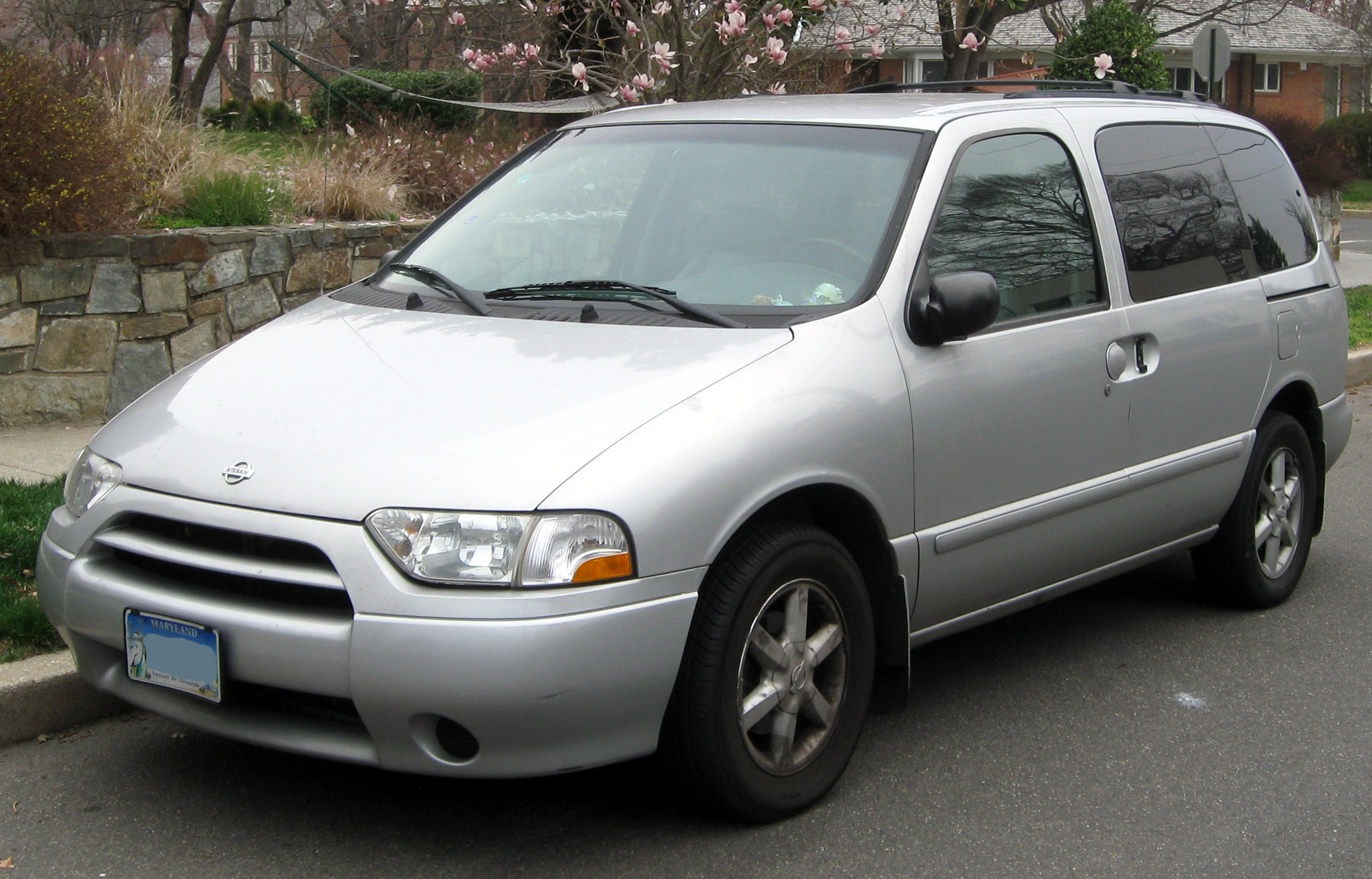
2002 Nissan Quest GLE (facelift)

For 2001, the second-generation Quest underwent a mid-cycle revision. While the Villager saw only detail changes made to its exterior, the Quest saw a redesign of its entire front fascia; along with fairing in the front bumper, the grille was restyled in line with the Altima (the Nissan emblem was moved to the hood). The rear stabilizer bar was made standard on all models, with the SE receiving upgrades to its suspension; GLE vehicles were fitted with 16-inch wheels.

The instrument panel underwent a redesign for the first time (centering the speedometer and tachometer between secondary gauges); the CD changer (on GLE-trim units) was replaced by a 6-disc unit integrated into the radio (still supplied by Ford). Two different rear-seat video systems were introduced: vehicles without the optional sunroof were fitted with a ceiling-mounted screen while sunroof-equipped vehicles used the system introduced for 2000.

For 2002, the Quest was withdrawn from the Canadian market. Few changes were made, distinguished by the introduction of 6-spoke alloy wheels. In June 2002, the final VX54-platform Quest was assembled by Ford.

== Third generation (V42; 2004) ==
Third generation
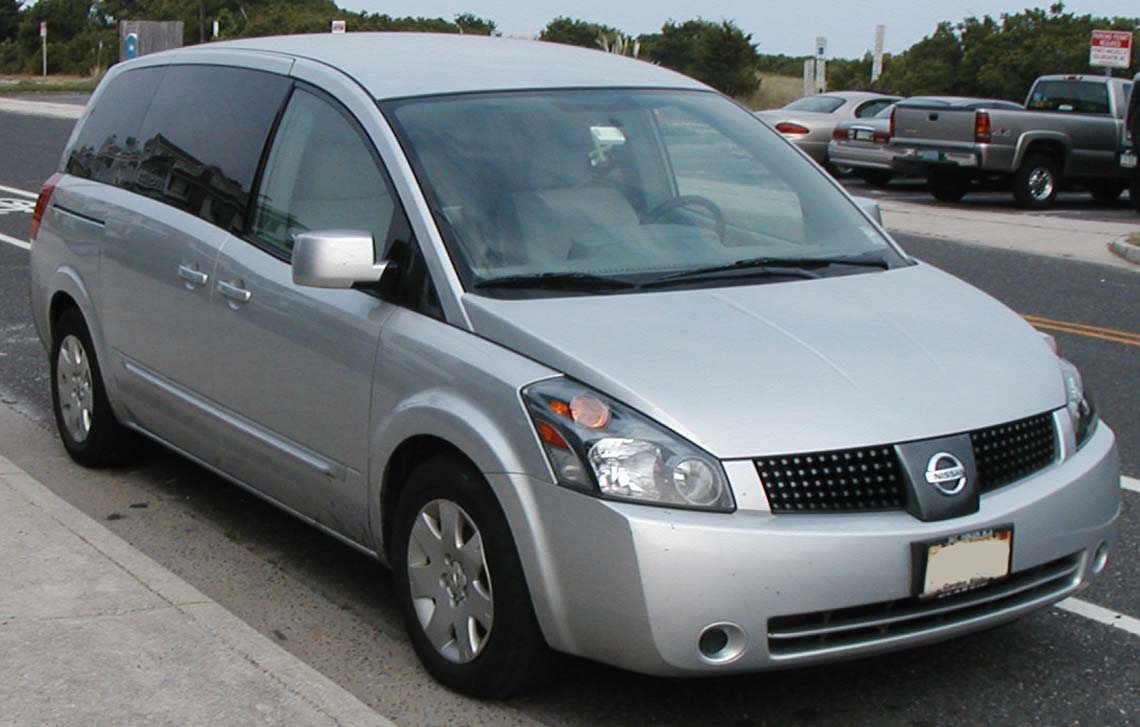
- 2004–2006 Nissan Quest

Overview
- Model code: V42
- Production: May 2003 – 2009
- Model years: 2004–2009
- Assembly: United States: Canton, Mississippi
- Designer: Alfonso Albaisa (2000)

Body and chassis
- Body style: 5-door minivan
- Platform: Nissan FF-L platform
- Related: Nissan Altima; Nissan Maxima; Nissan Murano; Nissan Teana

Powertrain
- Engine: 3.5 L VQ35DE V6
- Transmission: 4-speed automatic 5-speed automatic

Dimensions
- Wheelbase: 124.0 in (3,150 mm)
- Length: 204.1 in (5,184 mm)
- Width: 77.6 in (1,971 mm)
- Height: 70.0 in (1,778 mm) (2004-06); 71.9 in (1,826 mm) (2007–2009)

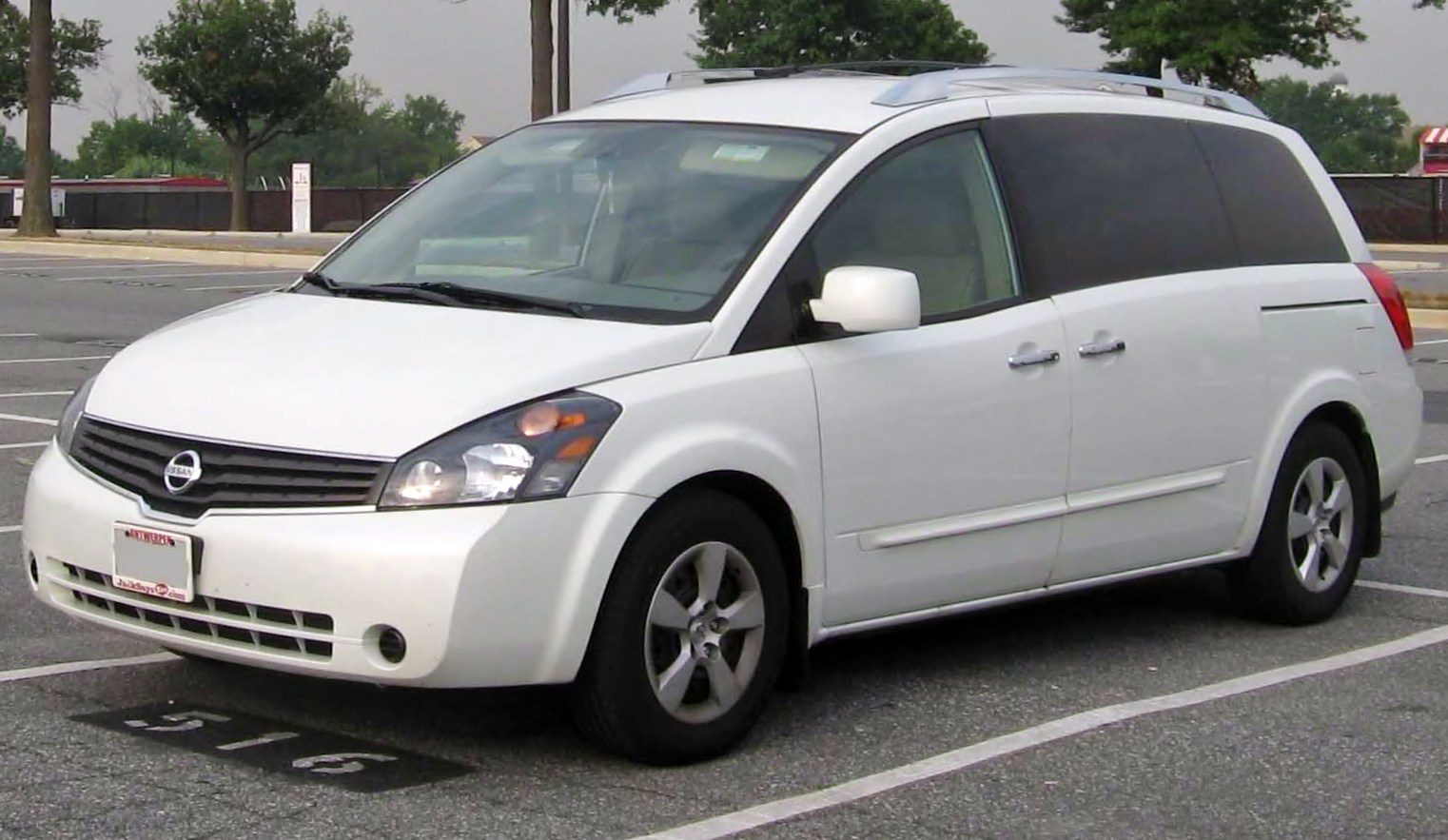
2007 Nissan Quest

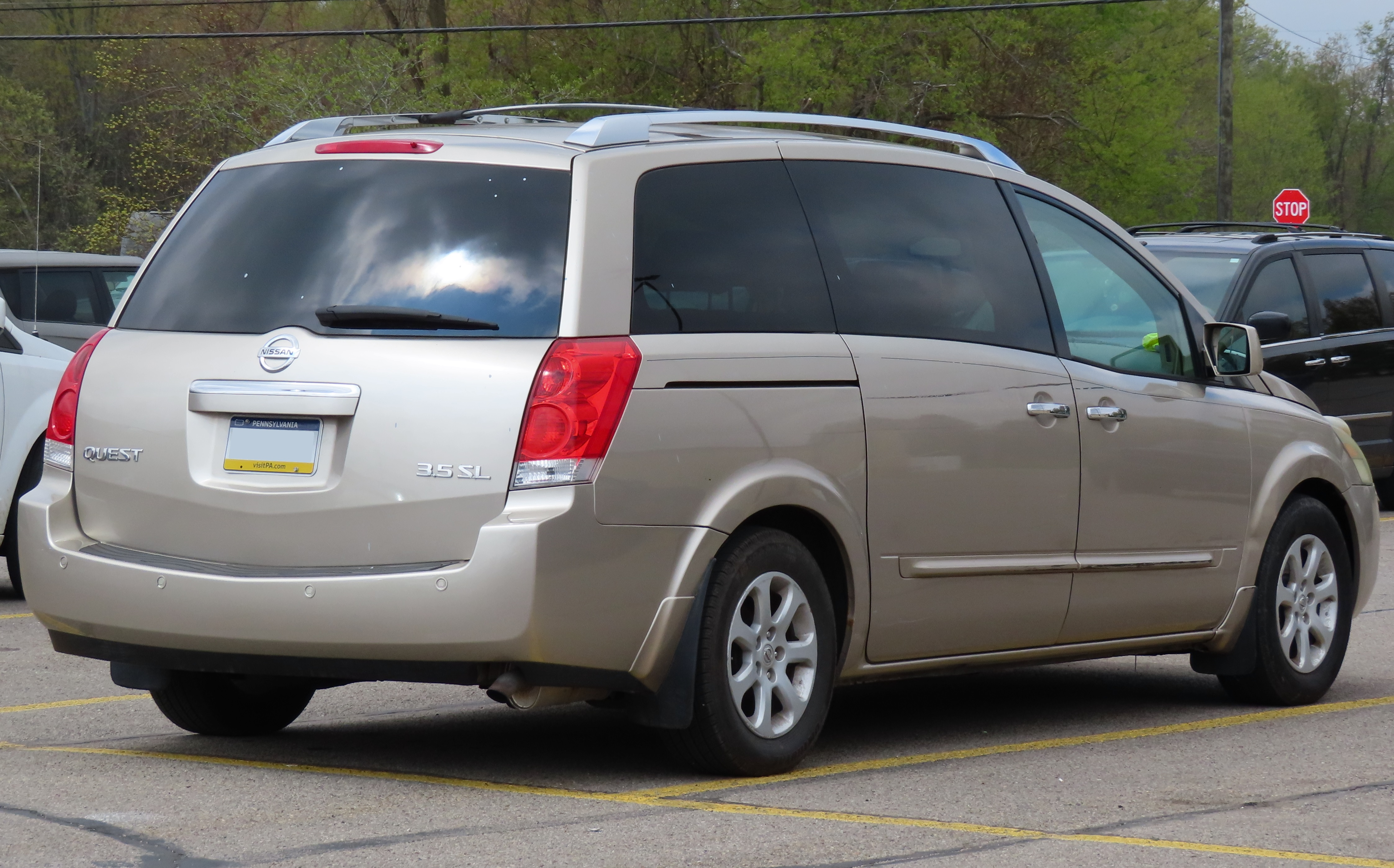
Rear view

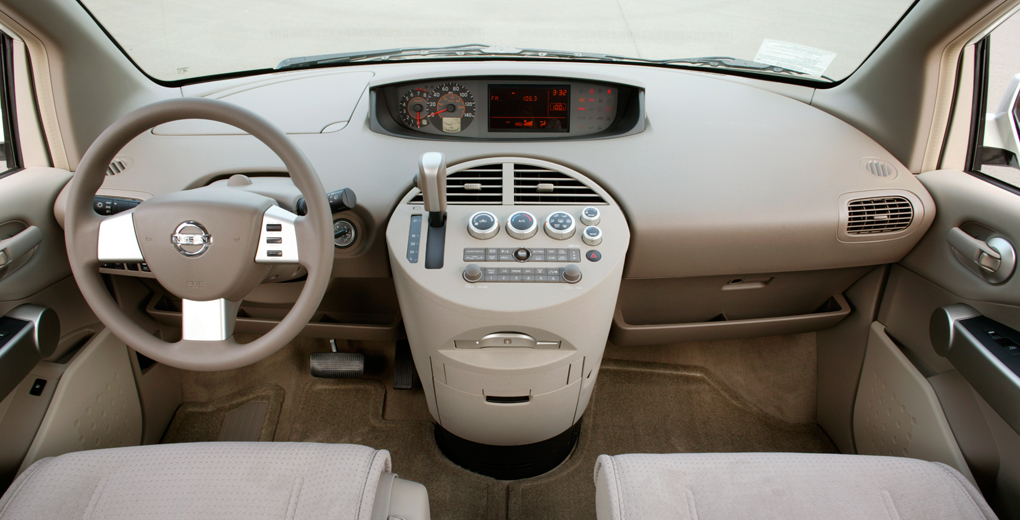
Interior

Development began in 1999 on the V42 alongside a proposed Ford replacement. In 2000, decisions were made by Ford and Nissan to abandon the joint venture three years earlier than had originally been planned. Both the Windstar and Quest replacements were then in initial development and undergoing the design process. As a result, Ford made plans to build a Mercury variant on the Windstar (WIN-96) successor's platform due in 2003 and Nissan on the Altima and Maxima platform. The design by Alfonso Albaisa was chosen in late 2000, with a concept vehicle being presented in January 2002 at NAIAS as a thinly veiled preview. Design patents were filed on December 27, 2002, and registered under D483,297 on December 9, 2003. The production third generation Quest was unveiled for the 2004 model year at the 2003 North American International Auto Show using the Nissan Altima and Nissan Maxima platform, Nissan's FF-L platform, in a package slightly longer than the Chrysler long-wheelbase minivans. Production was moved to a new plant in Canton, Mississippi and started on May 27, 2003.

The Quest is powered by the 3.5 L VQ35DE engine from the Maxima, Altima, and others. The 2004 Quest recorded a 0-60 mph acceleration time of 8.8 seconds. In the Quest, it produces 240 hp (179 kW) and 242 lb⋅ft (328 N⋅m) of torque. The Quest has a flat folding rear bench and the two middle chairs fold nearly flat into the floor. The interior volume is 211.9 cubic feet (6.00 m^{3}). Its appearance shows many similarities to the fourth generation Renault Espace which first appeared in 2002.

The third generation Quest features an unusual moonroof glass arrangement with separate panels above each passenger with individual retractable sunshades, while the roof above the passengers accommodates 2 DVD screens with auxiliary input plug, when the VHS shaped IWCC Xl system was discontinued. Also featured in the SE model were side front airbags, curtain airbags for all rows, VSC (Vehicle Stability Control), Traction Control, dual rear power sliding doors and power rear hatch, Bose audio with RDS and folding second row seats, dual climate control, and rear backup sensors. Nissan redesigned the front grille and the dashboard for the 2007 model year. They also moved the DVD player from under the front passenger seat to the instrument panel stack.

Production of this generation Quest ended after the 2009 model year, with Nissan stating that the automaker needed room at the Canton plant for production of a commercial vehicle based on the Nissan NV2500 concept.

=== Quest Concept ===
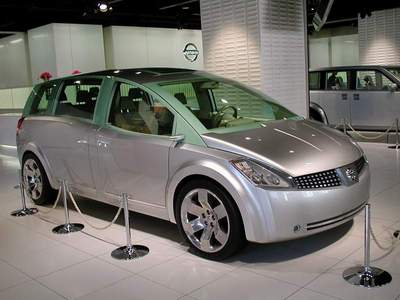
2002 Quest Concept front

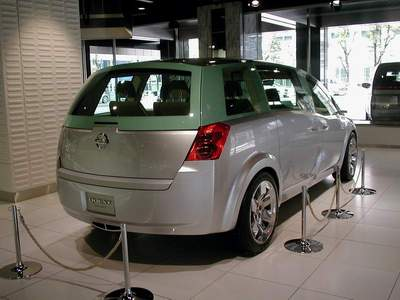
Quest Concept rear

In March 2022, a Facebook user found the V42 concept at Express Scrap Metals scrap yard near Nashville, Tennessee, waiting to be crushed, alongside the 2007 Nissan Bevel concept. The front end of the concept was nearly identical to the production V42, but the rear end used a different design from the production car. A Nissan spokesperson stated that the Quest and Bevel concepts had degraded to the point where maintenance proved impossible, stating "we kept them around as long as we could". The Quest and Bevel concepts were destroyed a few days later, with video proof taken as required by Nissan in order to ensure the concepts were destroyed in order to prevent any features from the concepts from being implemented in production vehicles. The 1999 Nissan NCS concept was destroyed as well.

== Fourth generation (RE52; 2011) ==
Fourth generation
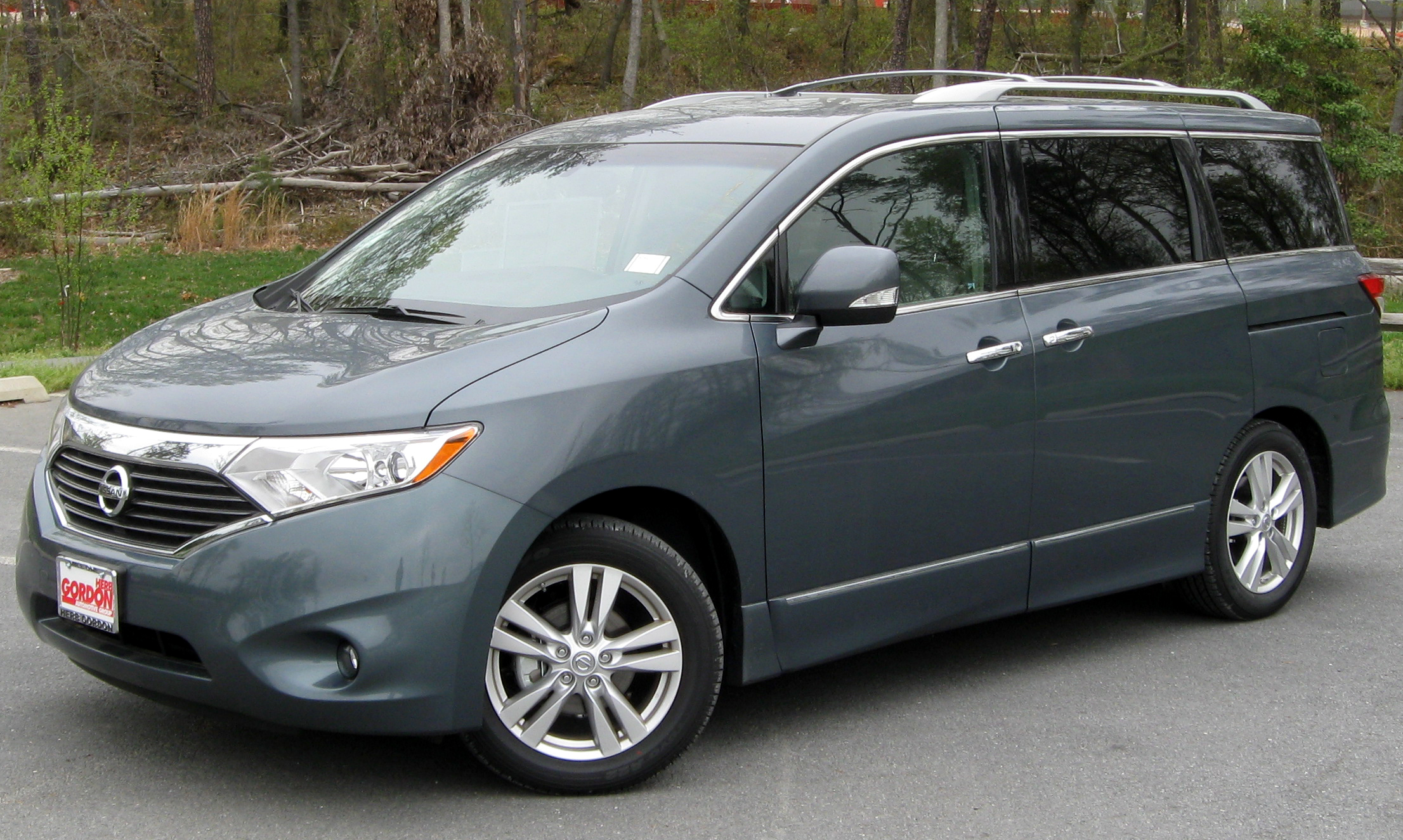
- 2011 Nissan Quest SL

Overview
- Model code: RE52
- Production: December 2010 – 2017
- Model years: 2011–2016 (2017 for the fleet market)
- Assembly: Japan: Kanda, Fukuoka (Nissan Shatai)

Body and chassis
- Body style: 5-door minivan
- Platform: Nissan D platform
- Related: Nissan Elgrand (E52)

Powertrain
- Engine: 3.5 L VQ35DE V6
- Transmission: CVT

Dimensions
- Wheelbase: 118.1 in (3,000 mm)
- Length: 200.8 in (5,100 mm)
- Width: 77.6 in (1,971 mm)
- Height: 71.5 in (1,816 mm)

The fourth-generation Nissan Quest was released for 2011, unveiled at the 2010 Los Angeles Auto Show. In a change from the first three generations, the 2011 Quest (codenamed RE52) was designed by Nissan in Japan, where the company relocated assembly to its Nissan Shatai facility.

The Quest was redesigned alongside the JDM Nissan Elgrand minivan (as it adopted front-wheel drive). The two models share a common chassis and much of their body work (differing primarily in taillamp styling), though the Quest is 4.7 in (120 mm) wider than the Elgrand. Slightly smaller than the previous generation, the fourth generation shed over 3 inches of length and nearly six inches of wheelbase.

The RE52 Quest carried over its 3.5L VQ series V6 engine (retuned to 260hp), replacing the 5-speed automatic with a continuously variable unit (CVT).

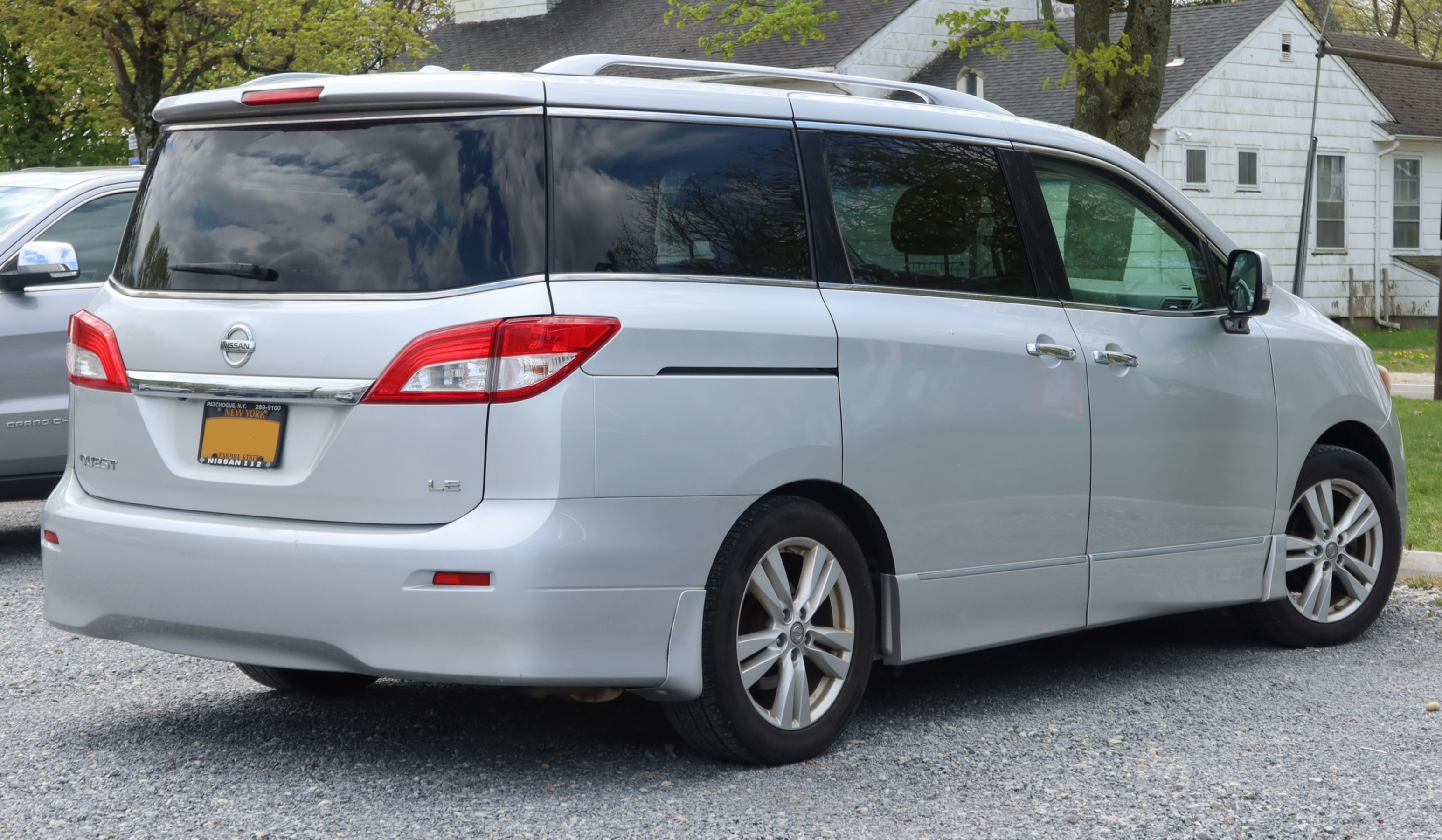
Rear view of 2012 Quest LE

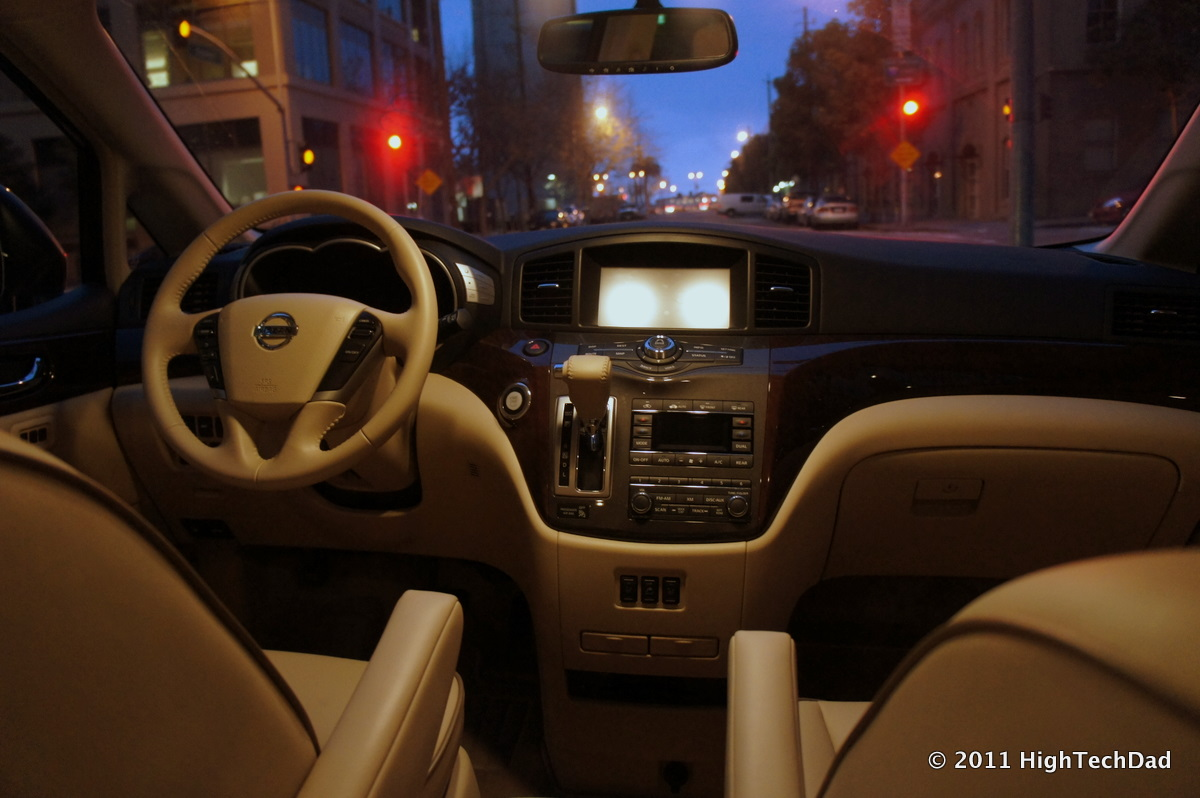
Interior

=== Marketing ===
In North America, the RE52 Quest competed against the Dodge Grand Caravan and Volkswagen Routan, the Toyota Sienna, the Kia Sedona, and the Honda Odyssey. In Japan, the similar Elgrand was marketed against the Toyota Alphard and the Honda Elysion. After the 2014 model year, the fourth-generation Quest was dropped from the Canadian market. Following declining sales, the model line was discontinued from retail sale in the United States after the 2016 model year; a shortened 2017 model year was produced solely for fleet vehicle sales.

To promote its release in China, the Quest was used as a free airport escort service vehicle at Beijing Nanyuan Airport and Beijing Capital International Airport for visitors traveling from those airports.

=== Safety ===
Speaking in 2014 to the performance of the third-generation Nissan Quest in a small overlap front crash test, which had been newly introduced in 2013, Insurance Institute for Highway Safety executive vice president Dave Zuby described it as "one of the worst crash tests we've ever seen". He speculated, "a person experiencing this would be lucky to ever walk normally again."

IIHS safety ratings for 2011 Nissan Quest
test	rating
Driver's side small overlap front	Poor
Moderate overlap front	Good
Side	Good
Roof strength	Acceptable
Head restraints and seats	Good

== Sales ==
Calendar year	United States	Canada
2005	40,357	2,065
2006	31,905	1,428
2007	28,590	1,341
2008	18,252	904
2009	8,437	402
2010	177	20
2011	12,199	1,022
2012	18,275	668
2013	12,874	662
2014	9,833	63
2015	11,018	2
2016	11,115	
2017	4,950	

== Bibliography ==
- 2009 Sales
- Canton Plant quality problems
