= Renault Samsung SM7 =

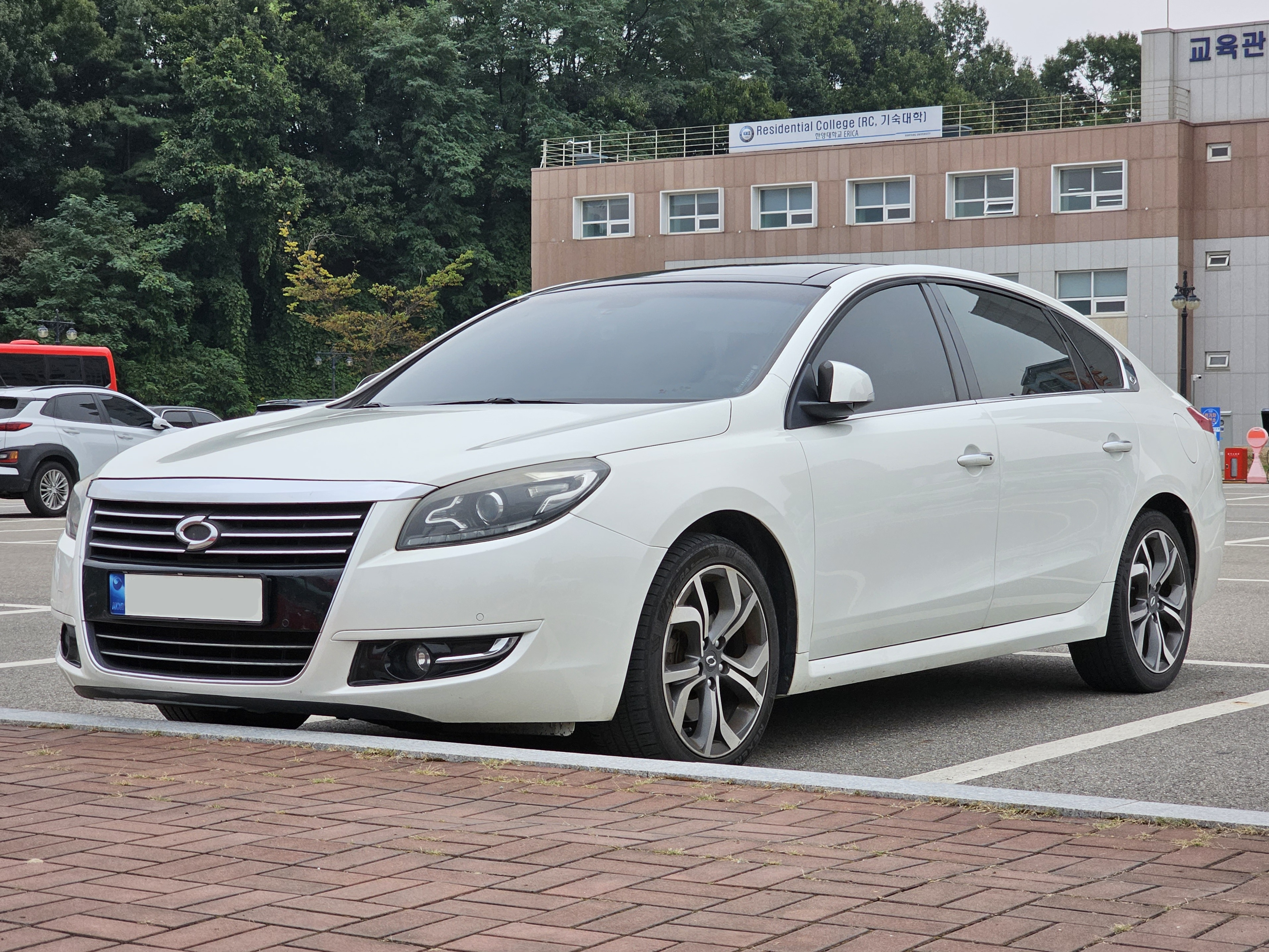

Overview
- Manufacturer: Renault Samsung Motors
- Production: 2004–2019
- Model years: 2005–2020
- Assembly: South Korea: Busan

Body and chassis
- Class: Full-size car/Executive car (E)
- Body style: 4-door saloon

The Renault Samsung SM7 is an executive car or full-size car (E-segment in Europe) that was produced by the South Korean manufacturer Renault Samsung Motors from 2004 to 2020.

== First generation (EX2) ==
Renault Samsung SM7
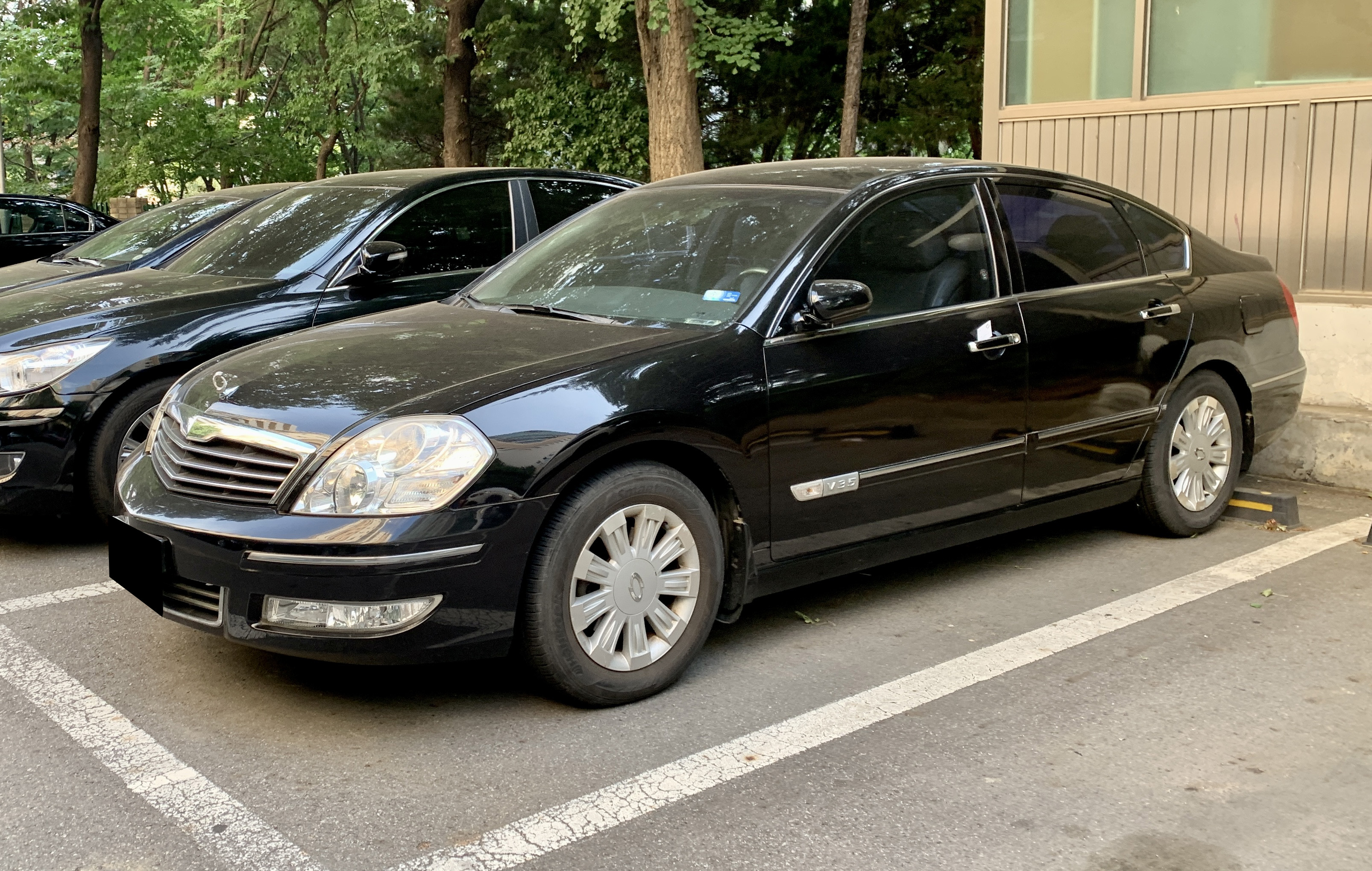
- A RS SM7 seen in Chile.

Overview
- Also called: Renault Samsung SM7 New Art (KDM Facelift)
- Production: 2004–2011

Body and chassis
- Body style: 4-door saloon
- Layout: Front engine, front-wheel drive
- Platform: Nissan FF-L platform
- Related: Renault Samsung SM5; Nissan Teana

Powertrain
- Engine: 2.3L Nissan VQ23DE V6; 3.5L Nissan VQ35DE V6
- Transmission: 4-speed automatic; 5-speed automatic

Dimensions
- Wheelbase: 2,775 mm (109.3 in)
- Length: 4,945 mm (194.7 in) (2004–2008); 4,950 mm (194.9 in) (2008–2011)
- Width: 1,790 mm (70.5 in) (2004–2008); 1,785 mm (70.3 in) (2008–2011)
- Height: 1,475 mm (58.1 in)

In October 2002, Renault Samsung Motors started to work on the "EX" project, a new car based on the Nissan J31 platform which shared underpinnings with the Nissan Teana (in Asian markets) and the sixth-generation Nissan Maxima (in Europe, North America and Australia). On 30 November 2004, the new car was revealed to the public as a high-end model. To distinguish it from the Teana various changes were made to the design with the aim of giving it a more solid image. The car had a significant safety equipment as standard. It was presented in five trim levels: SE, XE, LE, XE35 and RE35.

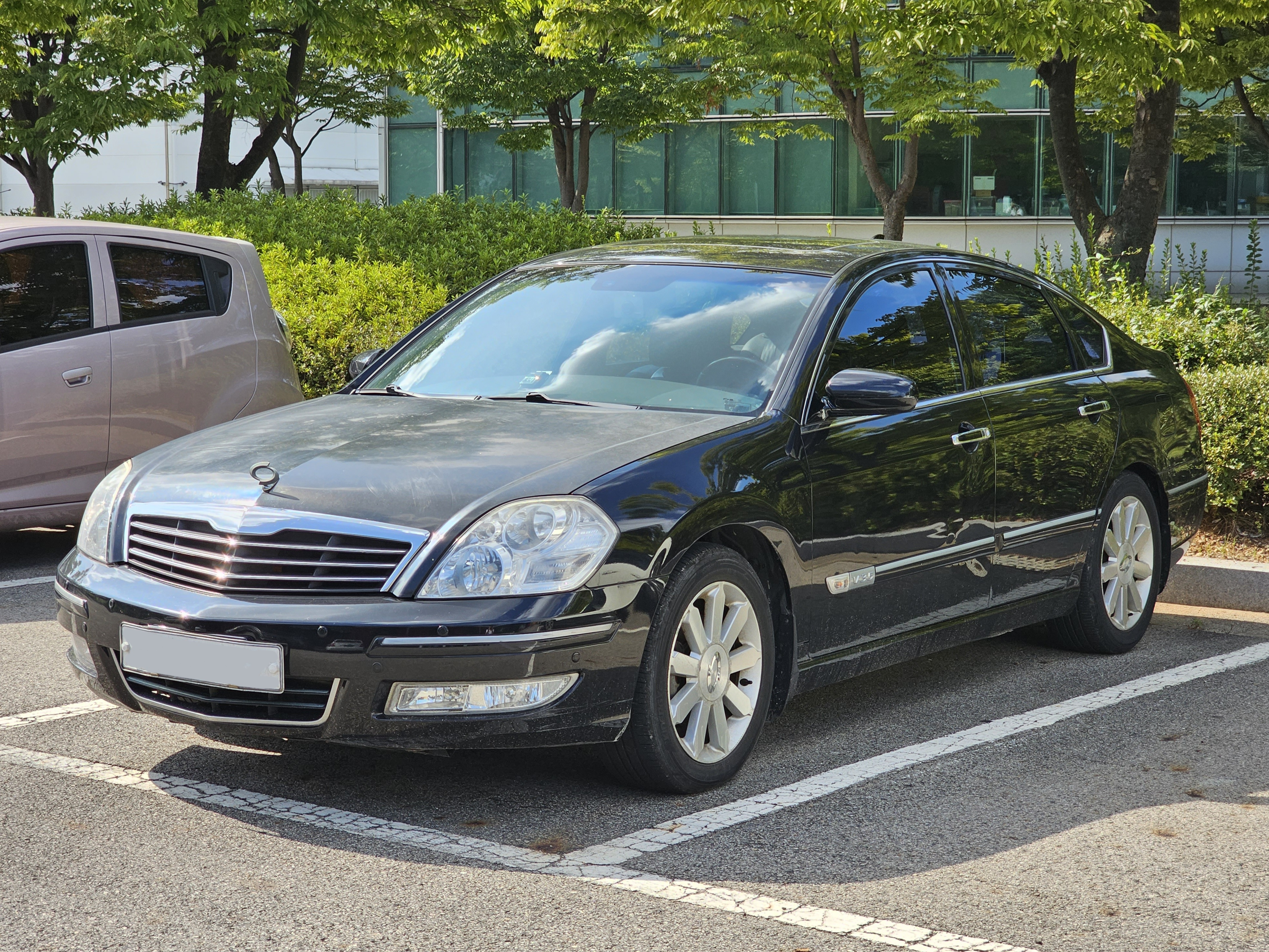
2004 Renault Samsung SM7 front

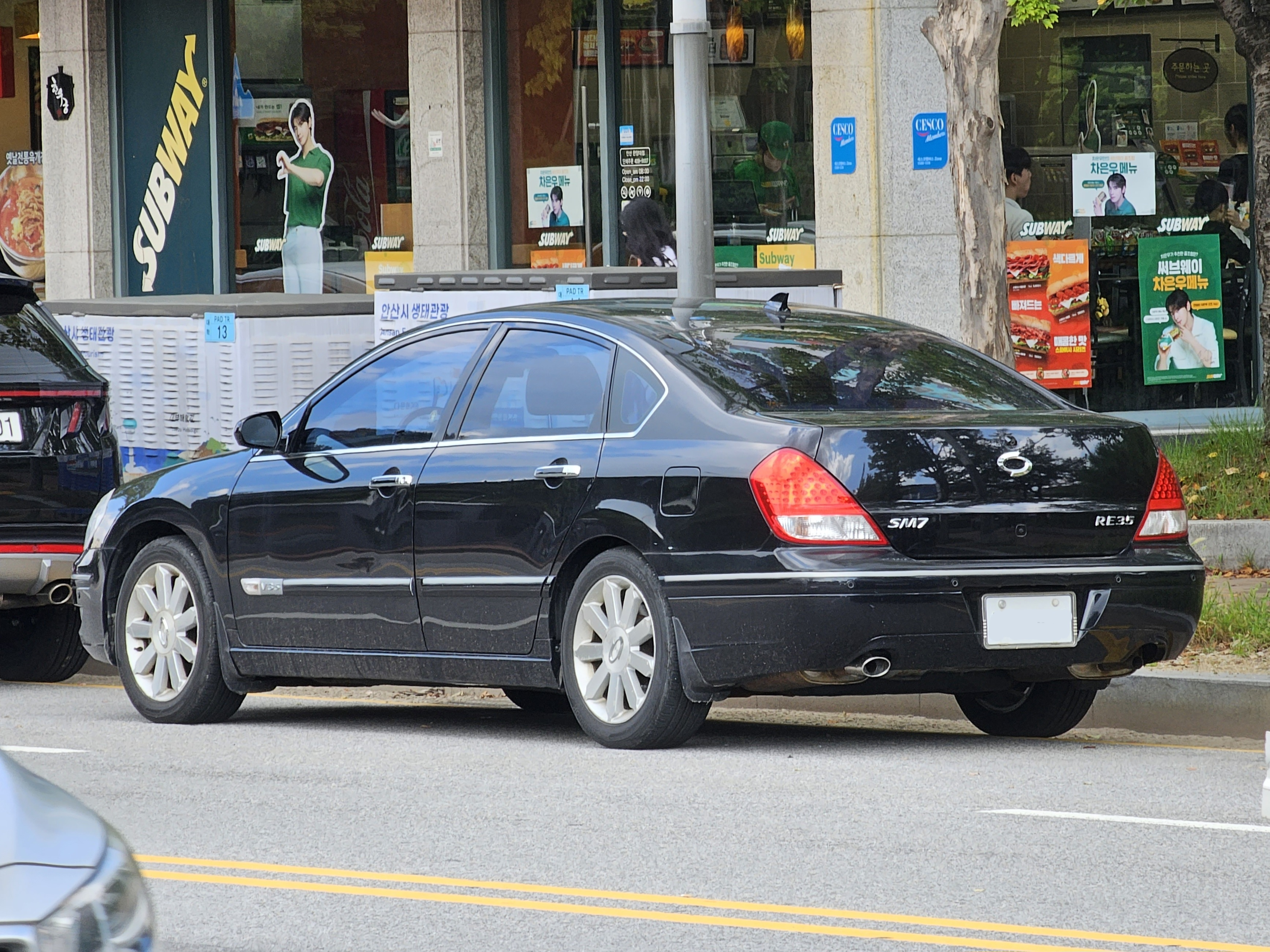
2004 Renault Samsung SM7 rear

=== Engines ===
The SM7 is fitted with either a 2.3L or 3.5L Neo VQ V6 engine, developed by Nissan. The 2.3L version was fitted to the SE, XE, LE trim levels and the 3.5L to the XE35 and RE35.

Engine	Code	Displacement	Power	Torque
Petrol engines
2.3L V6	Neo VQ23	2,349 cc	170 hp (125 kW) at 6,600 rpm	225 N⋅m (166 lb⋅ft) at 4,400 rpm
3.5L V6	Neo VQ35	3,498 cc	217 hp (160 kW) at 5,600 rpm	314 N⋅m (232 lb⋅ft) at 3,500 rpm

=== 2008 facelift ===
In 2008 a facelifted SM7 called New Art (Korean: 뉴 아트; RR: Nyu Ateu) was introduced, with a new front grille and improvements to handling and acceleration. The car dimensions were also slightly changed.

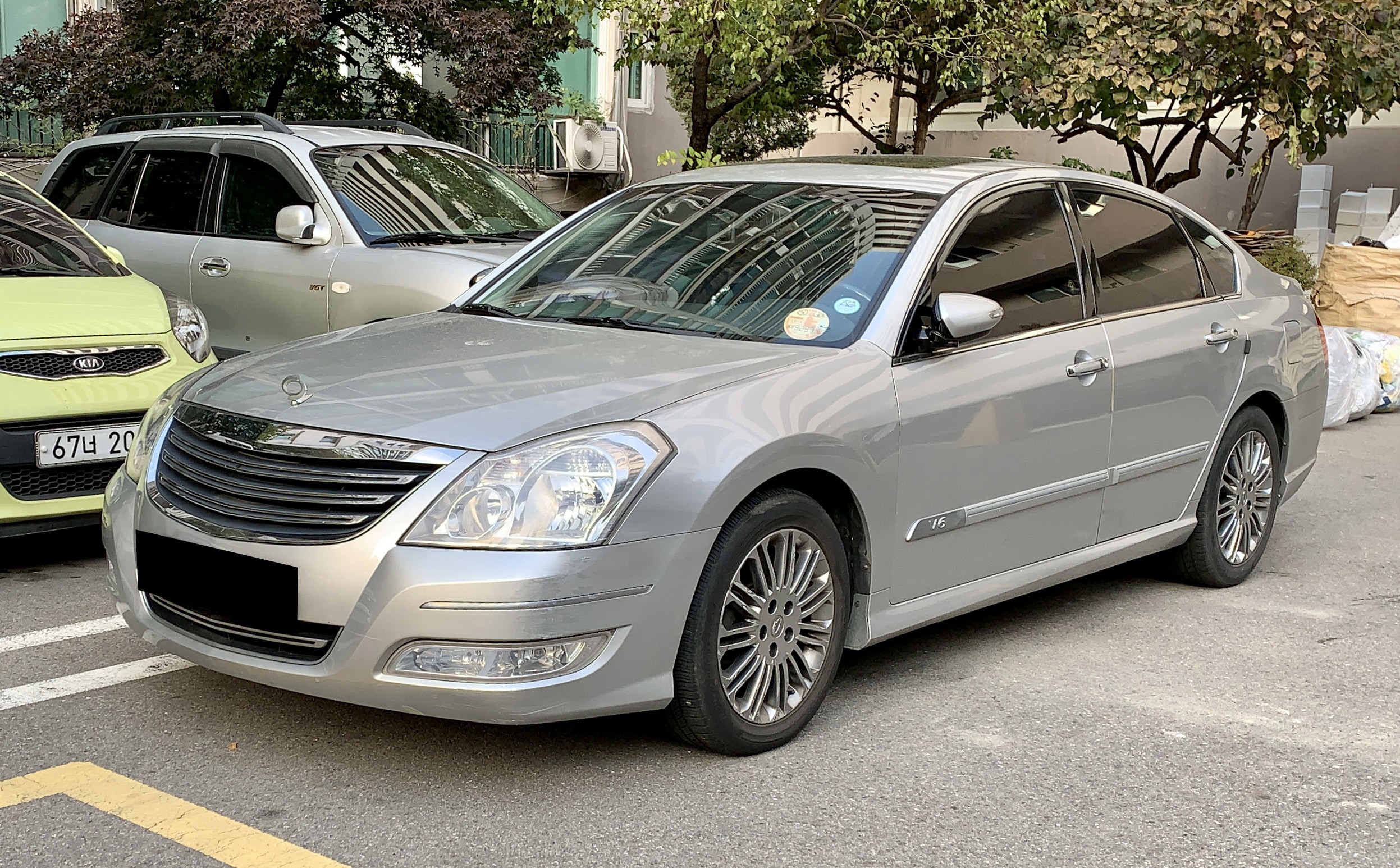
2009 Renault Samsung SM7 New Art front

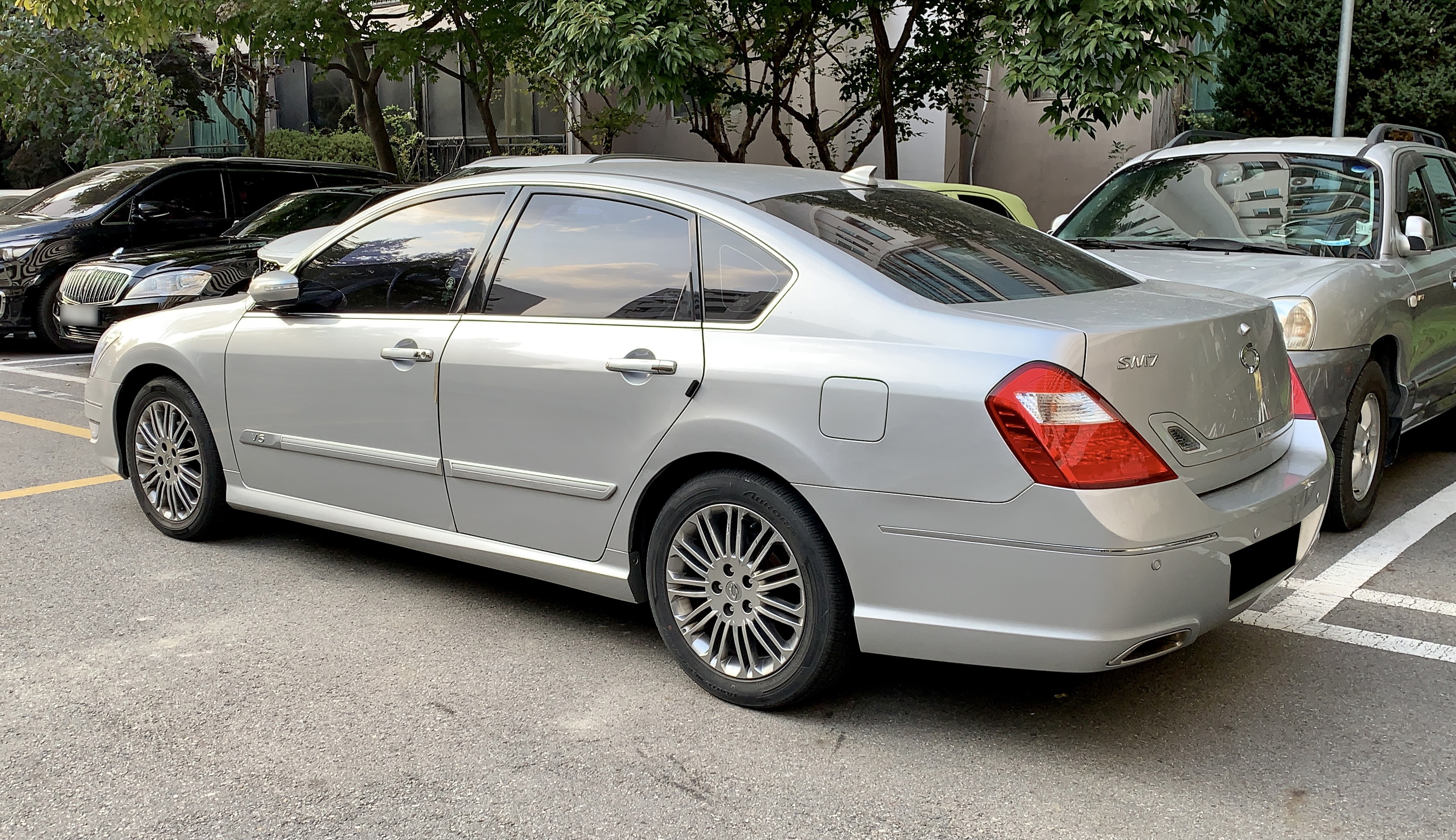
2009 Renault Samsung SM7 New Art rear

== Second generation (L47) ==
Renault Samsung SM7
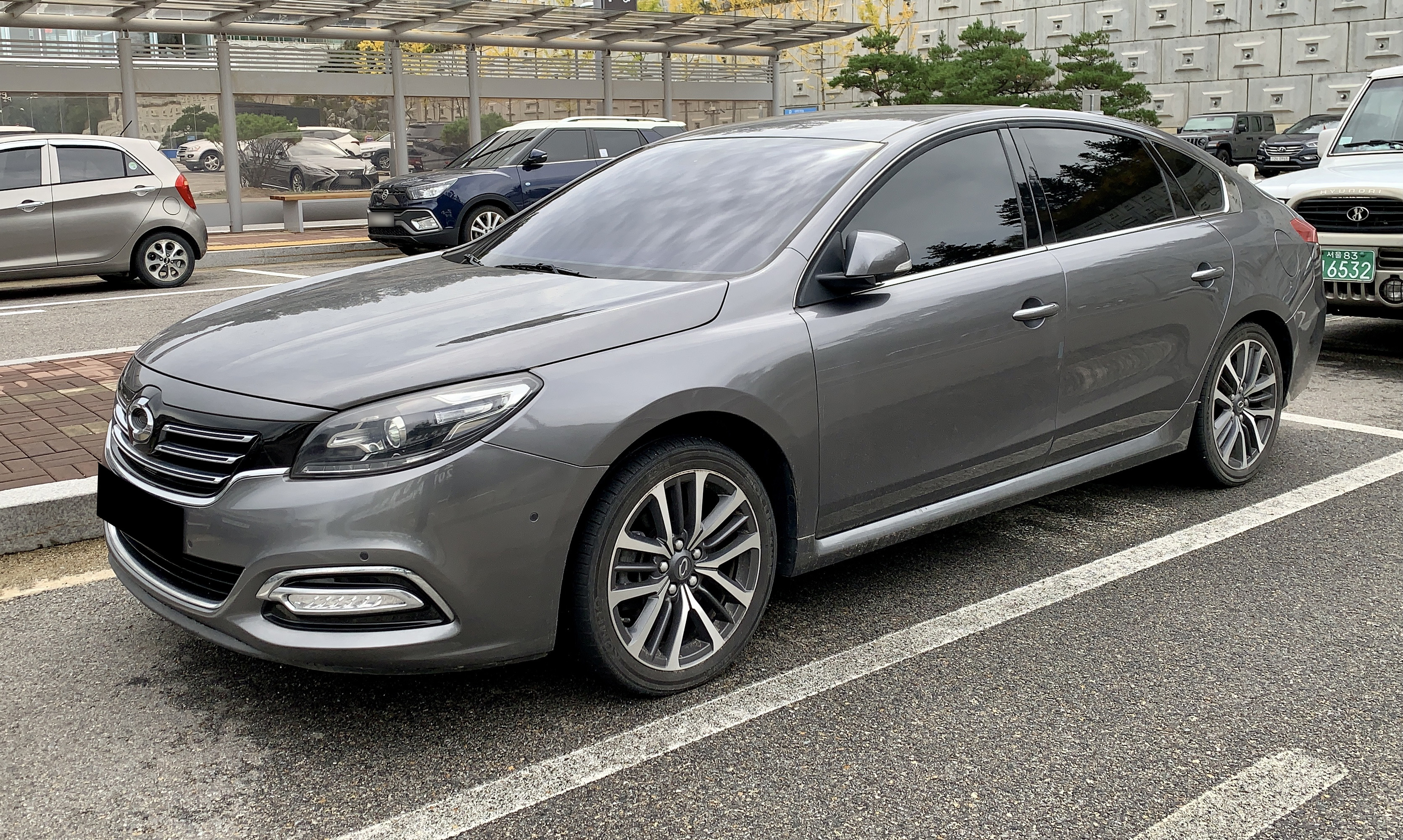
- A Renault Samsung SM7 used for test driving.

Overview
- Also called: Renault Talisman (China)
- Production: 2011–2019; 2012–2015 (China)
- Designer: Alejandro Mesonero-Romanos

Body and chassis
- Body style: 4-door saloon
- Layout: FF layout

Powertrain
- Engine: 2.5L 2ZV V6; 3.5L 5ZV V6
- Transmission: 6-speed automatic; 6-speed manual

Dimensions
- Wheelbase: 2,810 mm (110.6 in)
- Length: 4,995 mm (196.7 in)
- Width: 1,870 mm (73.6 in)
- Height: 1,480 mm (58.3 in)

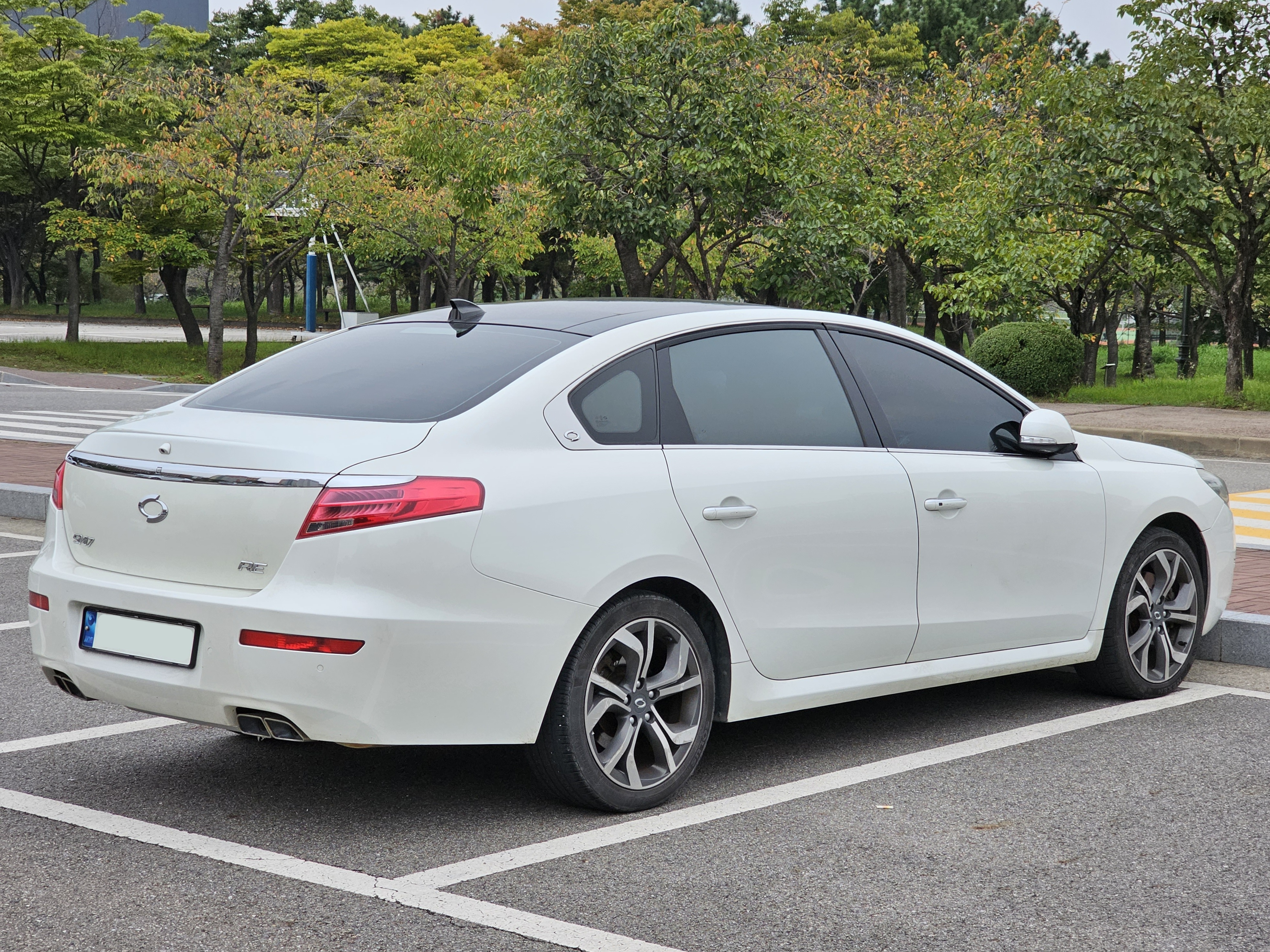
Rear

A new generation SM7, based on a stretched version of the third generation Renault Samsung SM5 (L43), was revealed and went on sale in South Korea since August 2011. A near-production concept version was presented in April. The development of the new car took more than 32 months, at a cost of about 400 billion won (270 million euros). It was conducted by the R & D department of Renault Samsung.

The powertrain consists of two third-generation Nissan VQ engines (of 2.5 and 3.5L) coupled with a 6-speed manual and automatic transmissions. The car has an integrated front bumper-grille with bi-xenon adaptive headlamps an LED lamps on the rear.

Renault Samsung presented three trim levels called SE, LE and RE. The equipment, depending on version, includes three-zone automatic air conditioning, improved ABS system, special headrest, fragrance diffuser, massaging seats, dual-stage airbags, paddle shifting and pressure-sensitive dampers.

=== Engines ===
Engine	Code	Displacement	Power	Torque
Petrol engines
2.5L V6	VQ25 (2ZV)	2,495 cc	190 hp (140 kW) at 6,000 rpm	243 N⋅m (179 lb⋅ft) at 4,400 rpm
3.5L V6	VQ35 (5ZV)	3,498 cc	258 hp (190 kW) at 6,000 rpm	330 N⋅m (243 lb⋅ft) at 4,400 rpm

==== LPG ====
In August 2015, Renault Samsung introduced a liquified petroleum gas-powered SM7.

=== 2012 facelift ===
The 2013 model year of the SM7 added a blind spot monitor system, a new satellite navigation and multimedia system and tyre pressure sensors. It also had minor changes to the front grille design.

=== 2014 facelift ===
In September 2014 Renault Samsung unveiled a facelifted SM7, the SM7 Nova (Korean: 노바; RR: Noba). The car incorporated the renovated design of the company introduced in the QM3, with a new front-end layout. It has a new infotainment system and a "smart mirroring" application. "Nova" is the Latin word for new star.

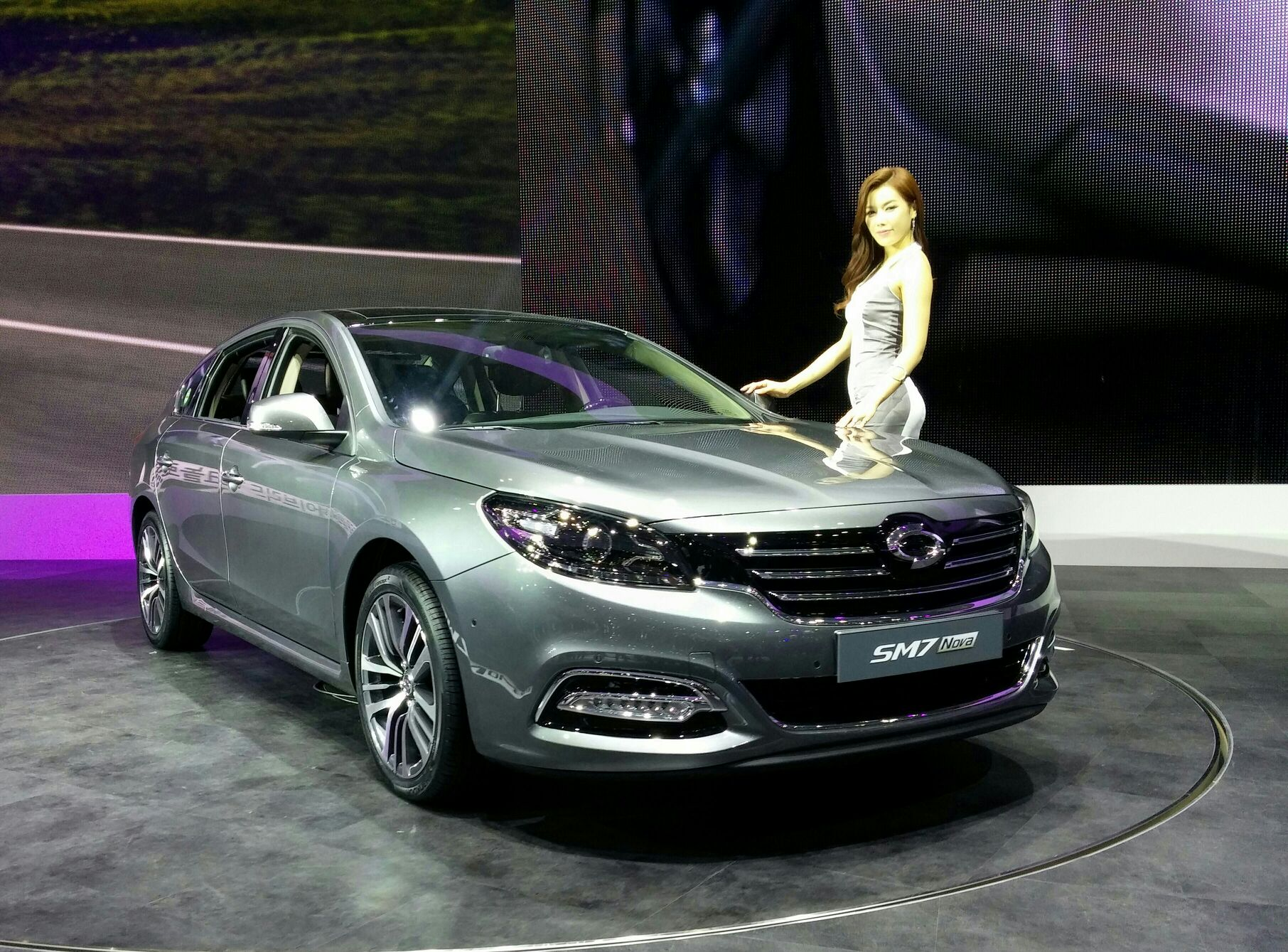
SM7 Nova

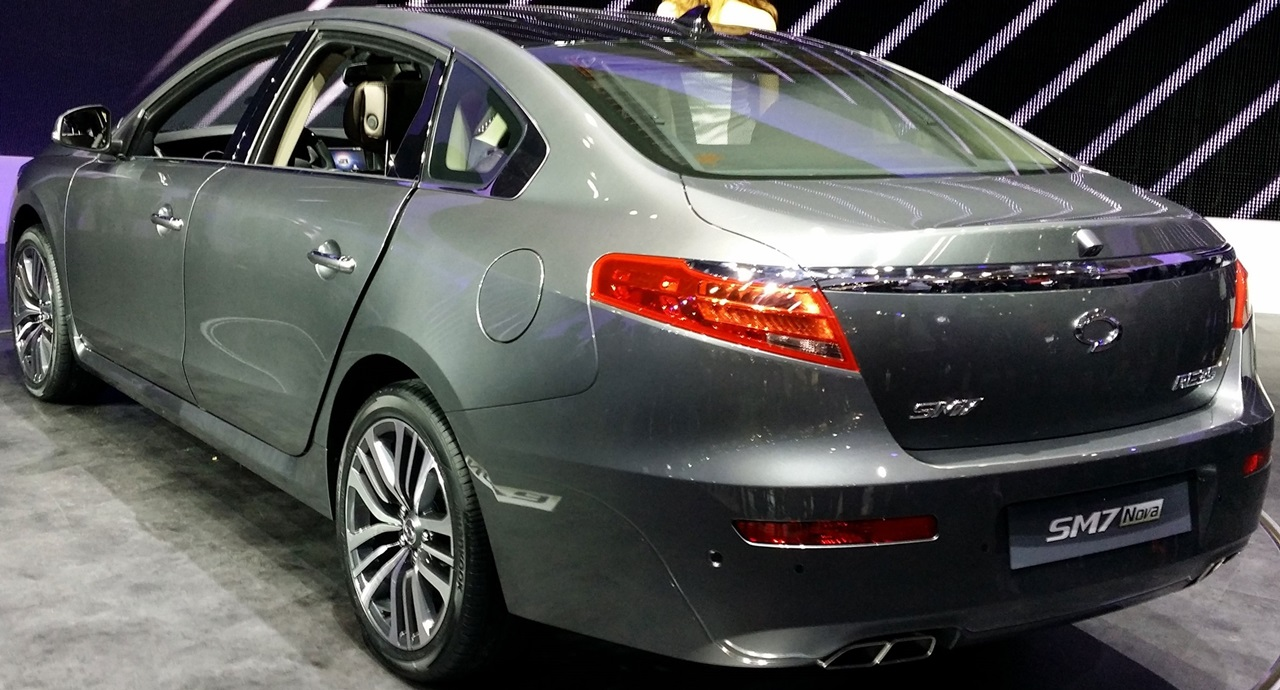
Rear

=== Renault Talisman ===
The Renault Talisman is a revised version of the SM7 sold exclusively in the Chinese market since June 2012, under the Renault marque. It was Renault's flagship saloon in China.

The Talisman takes its name from a 2001 concept car and was unveiled at the 2012 Auto China. The aim of its introduction was to reach the young businessmen.

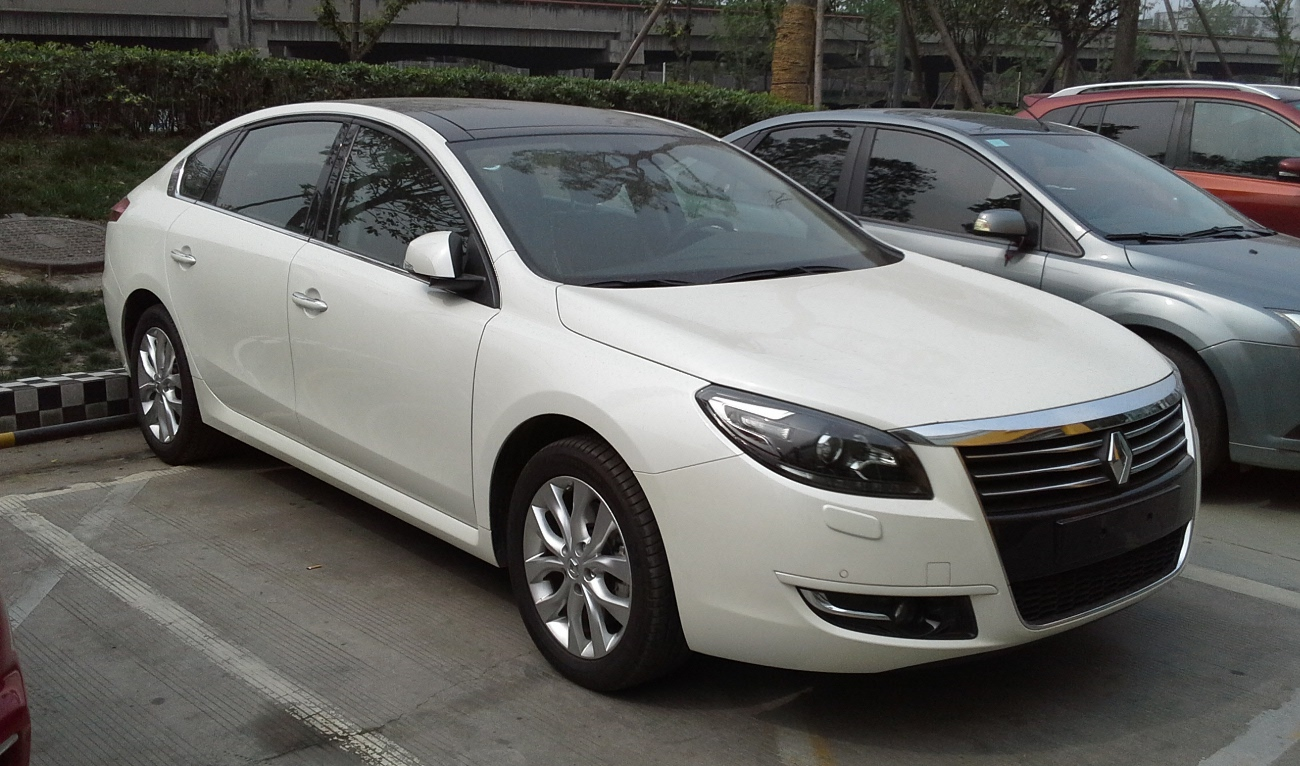
Renault Talisman in Shanghai.

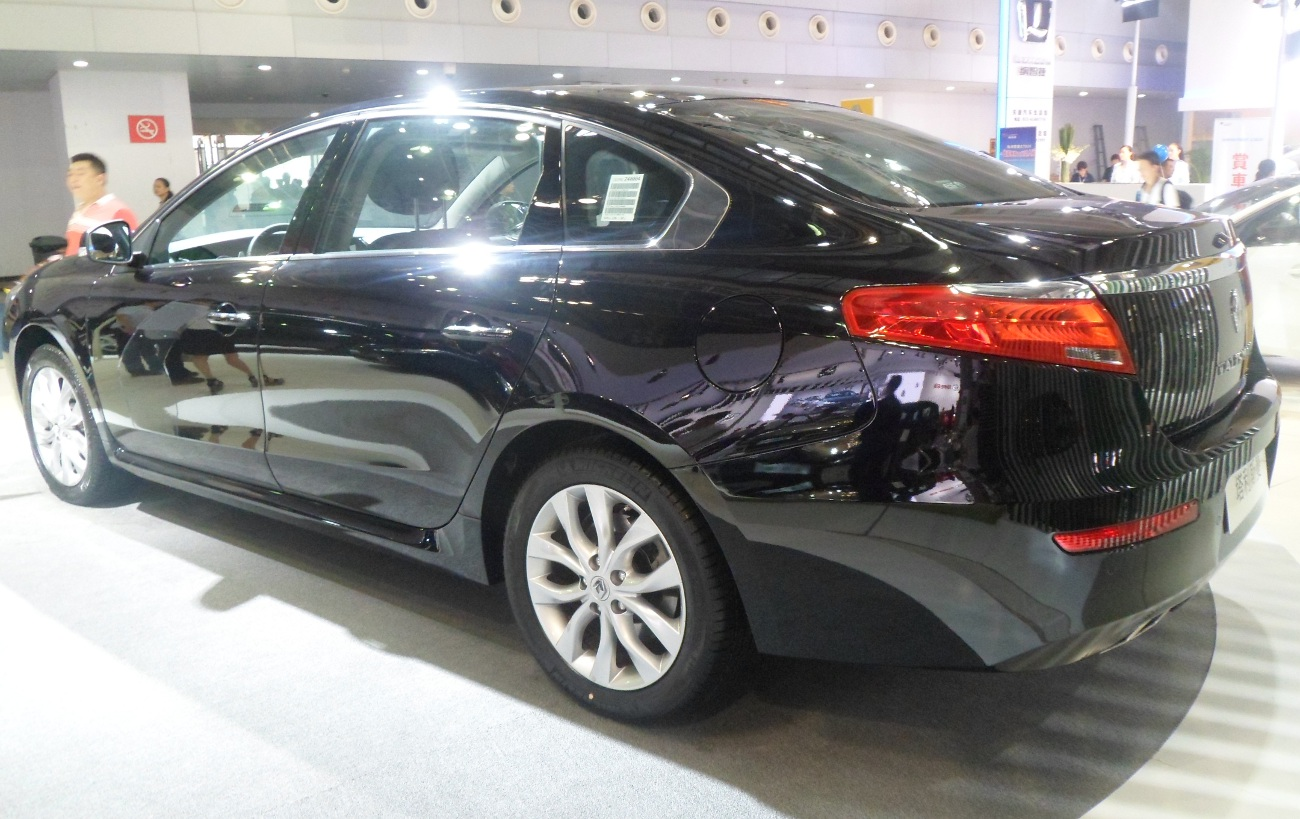
Rear of Renault Talisman

=== End of production ===
According to press reports, Renault Samsung stopped production of the SM7 in late 2019 and all stock was sold by early January 2020. The company removed the car from sale on its website that month.
