= Nissan FF-L platform =

Overview
- Manufacturer: Renault–Nissan Alliance
- Production: 2001–2011

Body and chassis
- Class: Midsize cars
- Layout: FF; F4
- Body style: Various

Chronology
- Successor: Nissan D platform

The Nissan FF-L was a front-wheel drive automobile platform developed and manufactured by Nissan from 2001 through 2011. The acronym FF-L stood for Front engine, Front wheel drive, Large, despite this it was designed to underpin a range of midsize vehicles. The FF-L platform was one of several platforms employed by Nissan during this period, alongside others such as the rear-wheel drive Nissan FM platform. In North America FF-L cars were built at Nissan's factory in Smyrna, Tennessee, from June 2004 onwards. Altimas were also built in Nissan's Canton, Mississippi factory due to increased demand.

The FF-L platform featured a longer wheelbase and wider stance by placing the wheels closer to the corners of the vehicle. This design increased interior space and was claimed by the manufacturer to improve automobile handling without extending overall vehicle length.

The FF-L platform was replaced by the Renault–Nissan D platform which was described as a mild update rather than a fundamental change.

== Models ==
- 2001–2006 Nissan Altima
- 2002–2007 Nissan Murano
- 2003–2008 Nissan Maxima
- 2003–2009 Nissan Quest
- 2003–2008 Nissan Teana
- 2003–2009 Nissan Presage
- 2004–2011 Renault Samsung SM7
- 2005–2010 Renault Samsung SM5

== Gallery ==
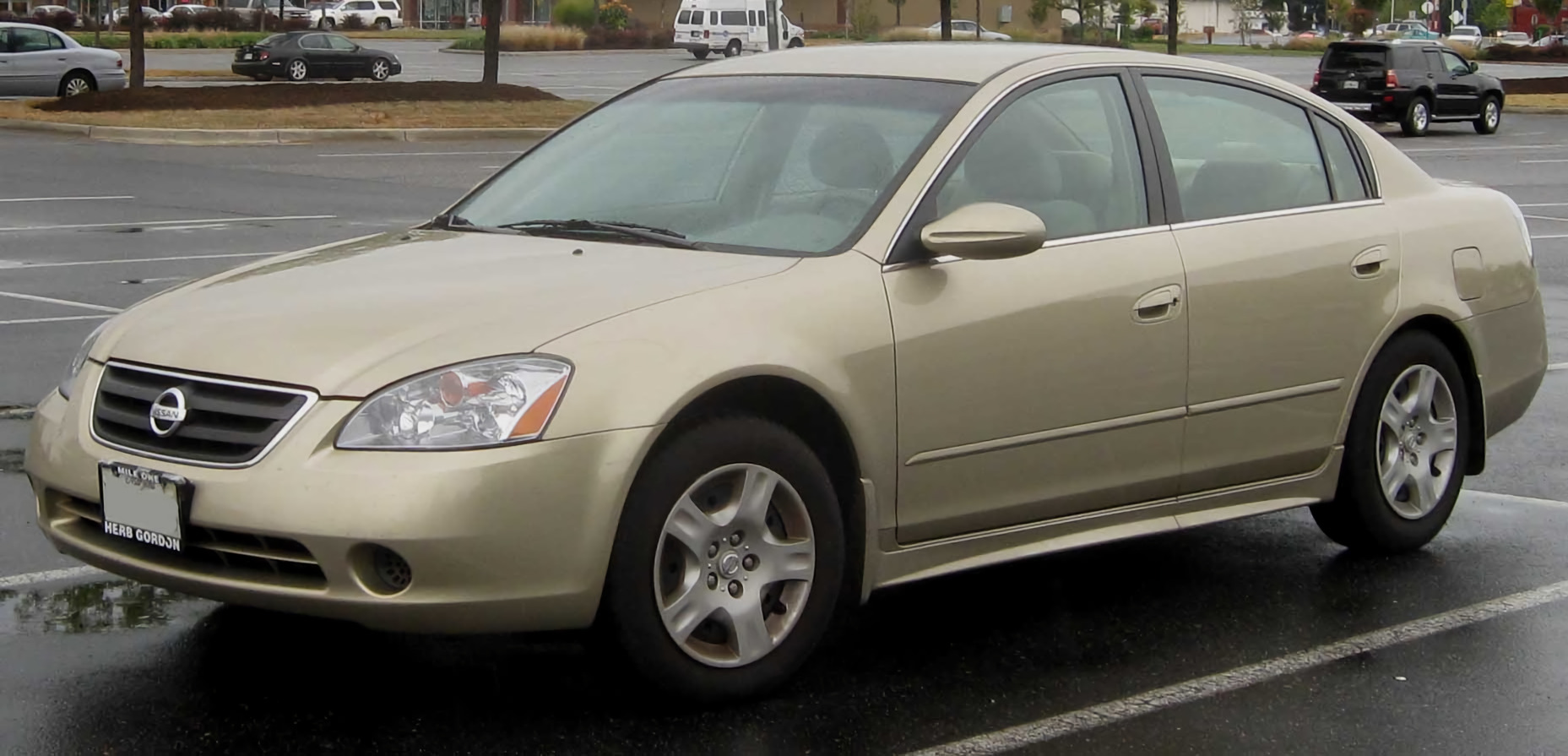
Nissan Altima

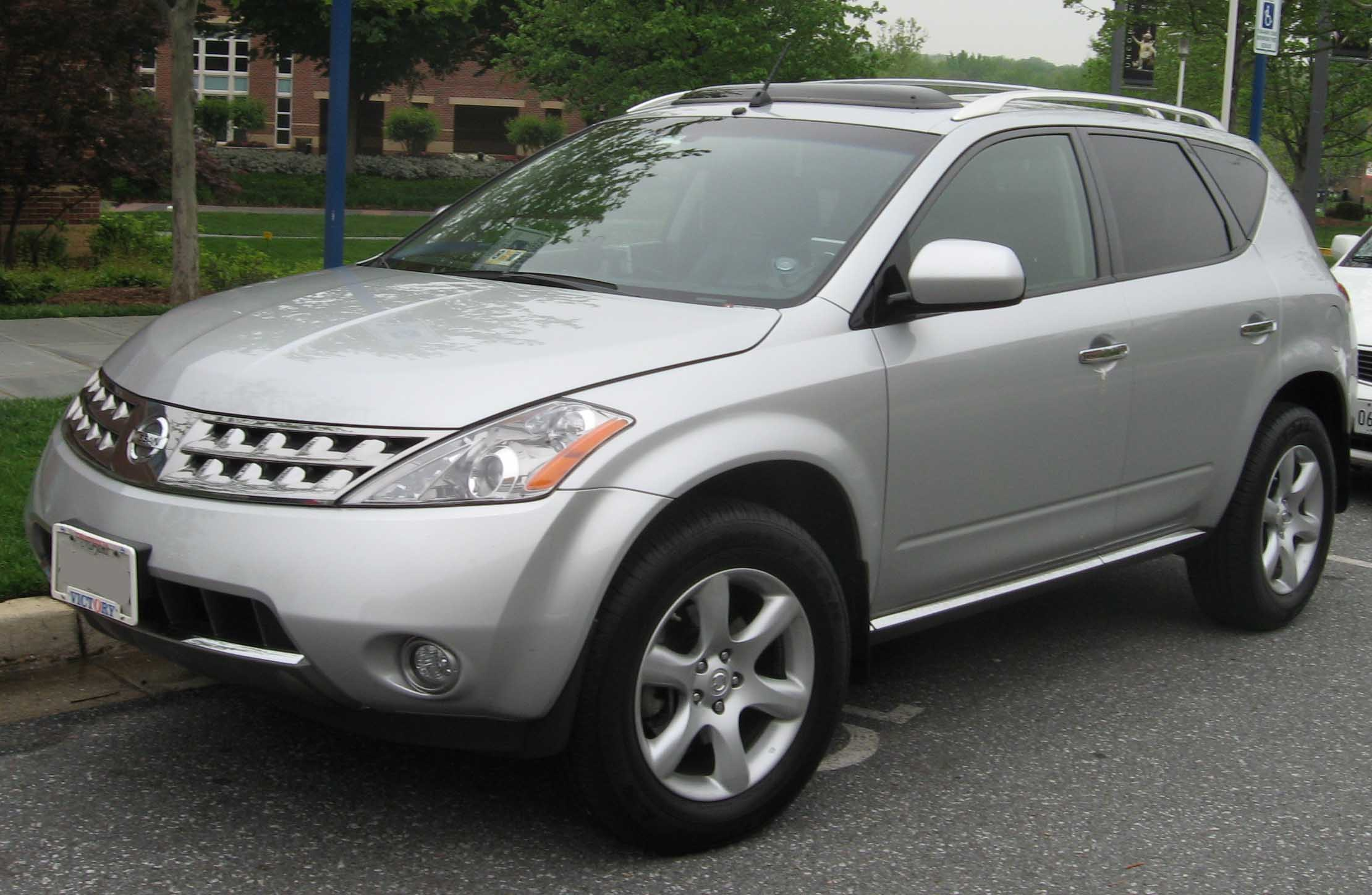
Nissan Murano

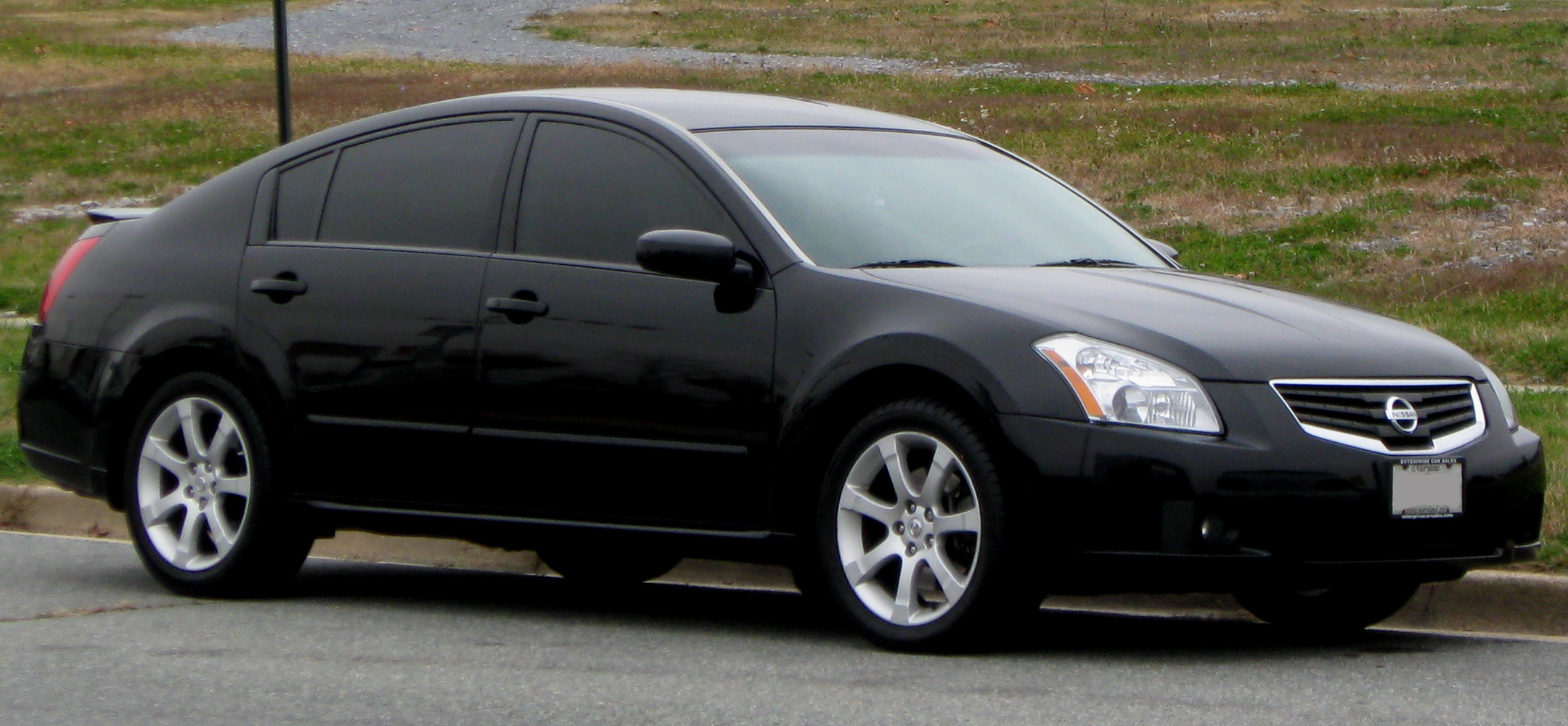
Nissan Maxima

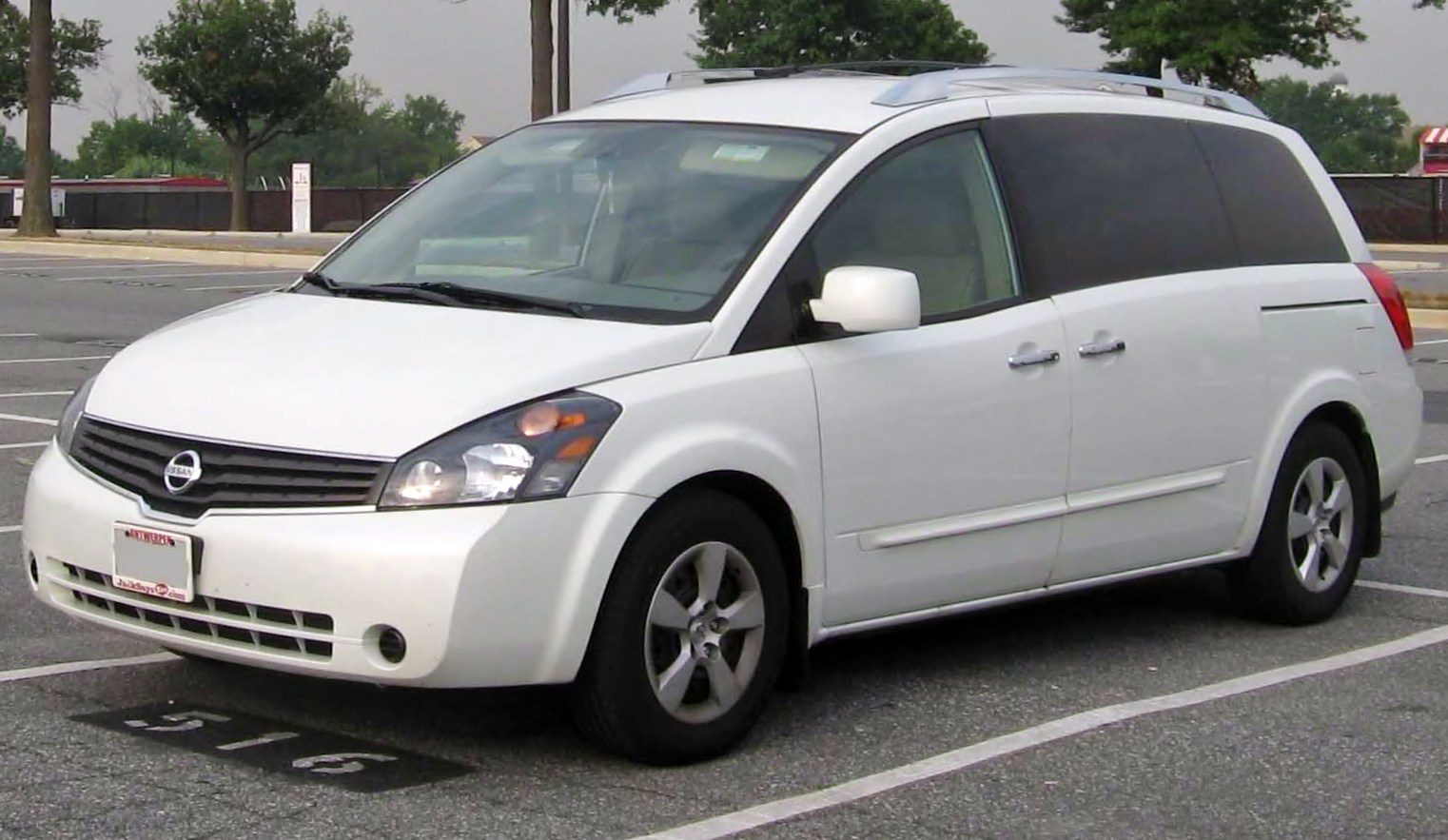
Nissan Quest

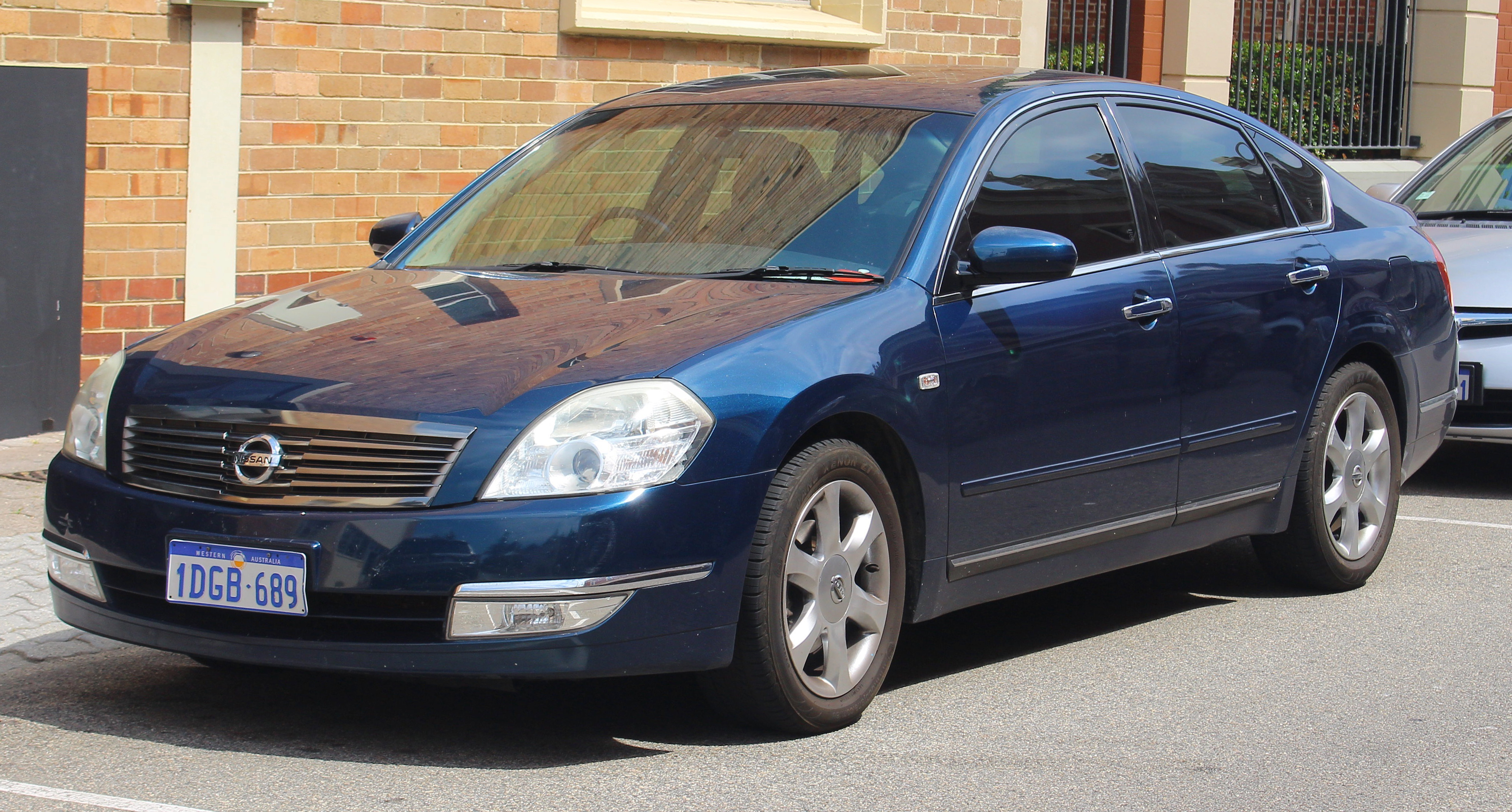
Nissan Teana

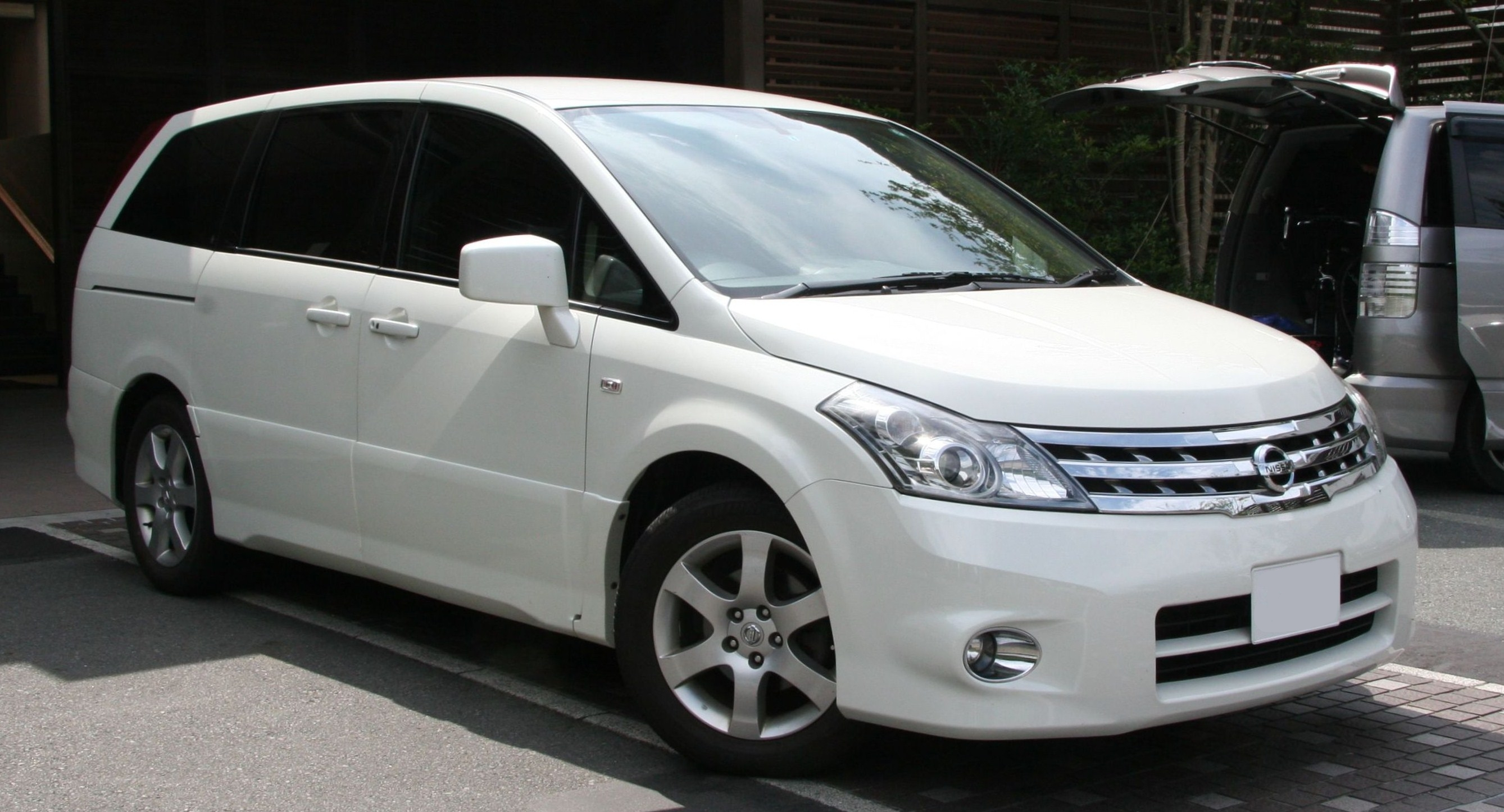
Nissan Presage

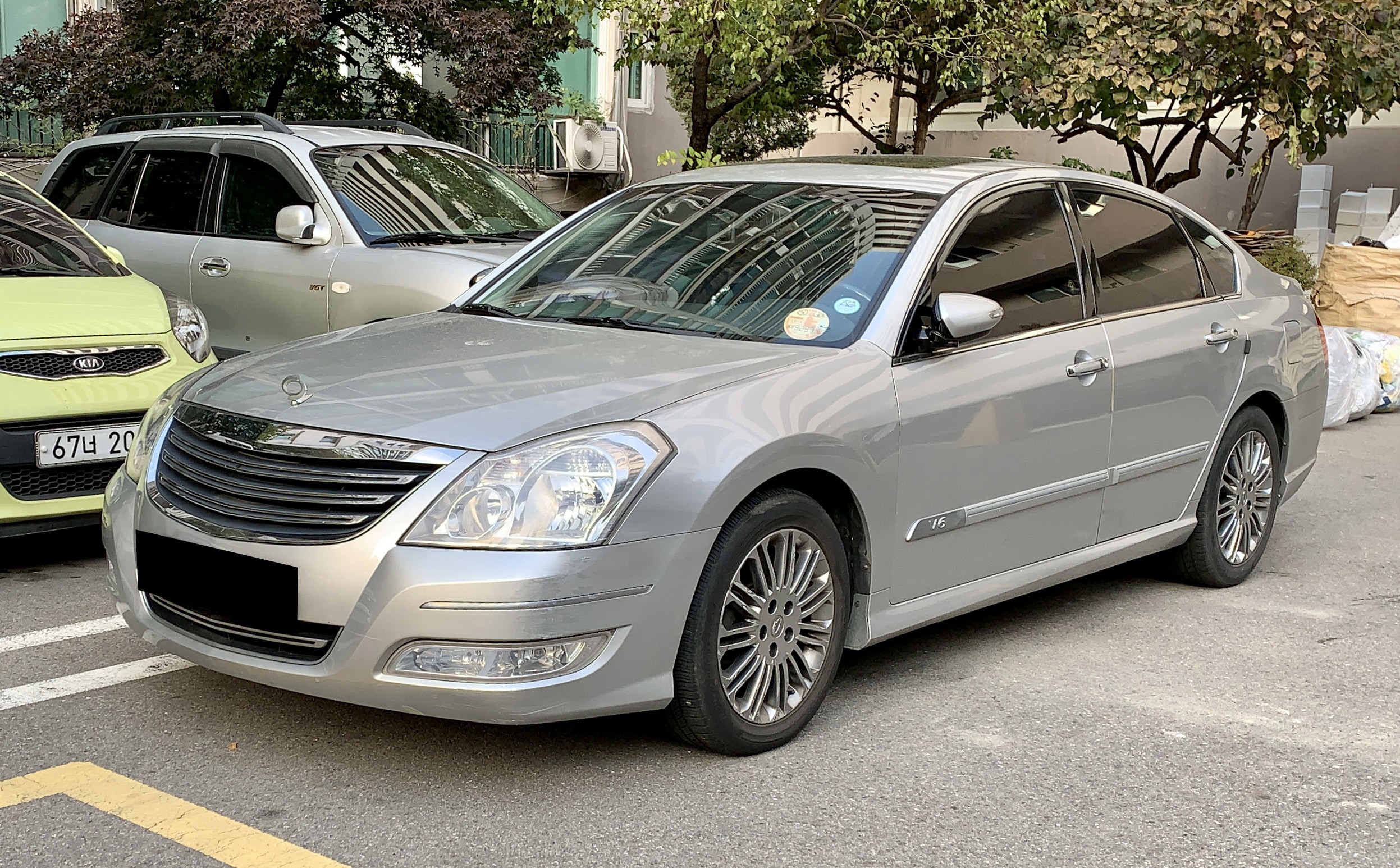
Renault Samsung SM7

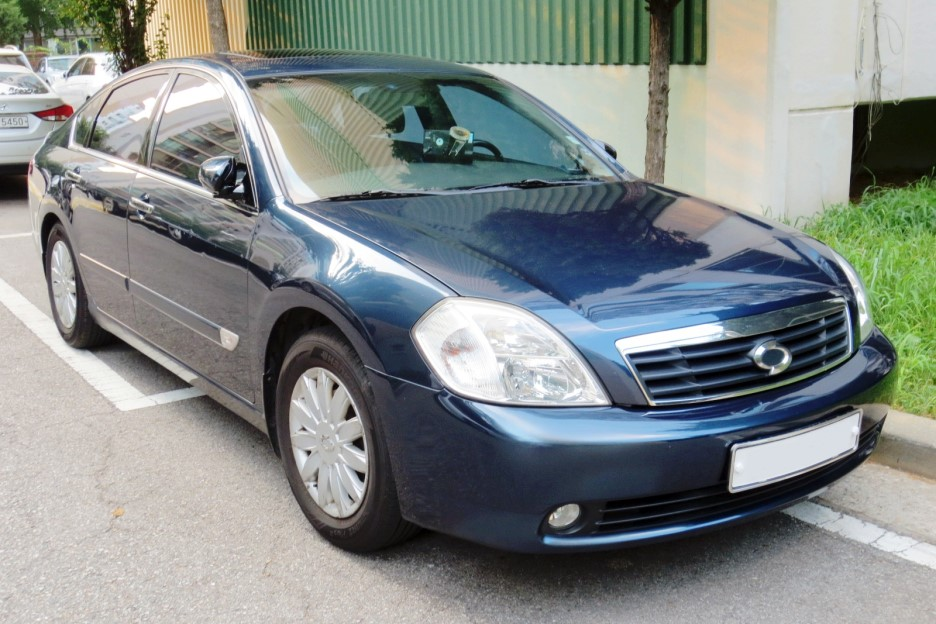
Renault Samsung SM5
