= Nissan Smyrna Assembly Plant =

Automotive assembly plant in Smyrna, Tennessee, United States

Coordinates: 35.964°N 86.490°W

- Built: 1981 - 1983
- Operated: 1983 - present
- Location: 983 Nissan Drive; Smyrna, Tennessee, United States
- Products: Nissan Pathfinder; Infiniti QX60; Nissan Rogue; Nissan Murano
- Employees: 8,400
- Area: 884 acres (3.58 km^{2})
- Volume: 6,400,000 square feet (590,000 m^{2})
- Owner: Nissan North America, Inc.

The Nissan Smyrna assembly plant is an automobile assembly plant in Smyrna, Tennessee, that began production in 1983 and employs approximately 8,000 people. The plant has an annual capacity of 640,000 cars, which was the highest in North America in 2017.

== History ==
The Nissan Smyrna Assembly Plant was announced on October 31, 1980, for the production of Datsun pickup trucks. The company had also considered two locations in Georgia, but ultimately chose the Tennessee site due to its central location within the U.S. automotive market and the ability to transport parts to the site at a lower cost. Construction on the plant began on February 3, 1981. Initially expected to cost $300 million (equivalent to $983 million in 2025), the final cost was $660 million (equivalent to $1.79 billion in 2025). While the plant was under construction, the Tennessee Department of Transportation (TDOT) constructed Nissan Drive (now part of State Route 102), a four-lane highway which connects the plant to nearby Interstate 24. Construction was completed in 1983, and the first vehicle was produced on June 16 of that year. A dedication ceremony was held for the plant on October 21, 1983.

On May 26, 2010, work began on a battery manufacturing plant onsite for electric vehicles, primarily the Nissan Leaf. This plant became operational in December 2012, and the plant began manufacturing the Leaf the following year, the first electric vehicle to be manufactured in Tennessee. Nissan decided to sell its battery plant to GSR Capital in July 2017. However, this sale did not actually happen and after three delays was canceled in July 2018 as GSR Capital did not pay on time.

== Models manufactured ==
=== Current ===
- Nissan Pathfinder (2005–present)
- Infiniti QX60 (2014–present)
- Infiniti QX65 (2026–present)
- Nissan Rogue (2014–present)
- Nissan Murano (2020–present)

=== Former ===
- Nissan Pickup (1983–1997)
- Nissan Sentra (1985–1999)
- Nissan Altima (1993–2020)
- Nissan Frontier (1998–2012)
- Nissan Xterra (2000–2012)
- Suzuki Equator (2009–2012)
- Infiniti JX35 (2013)
- Nissan Maxima (2003–2023)
- Nissan Leaf (2013–2025)
