= Infiniti QX65 =

Mid-size luxury crossover SUV

- 2027 Infiniti QX65

Overview
- Manufacturer: Nissan
- Production: April 2026 – present
- Model years: 2027–present
- Assembly: United States: Smyrna, Tennessee (Smyrna Assembly Plant)

Body and chassis
- Class: Mid-size luxury crossover SUV
- Body style: 5-door coupé SUV
- Layout: Transverse front-engine, all-wheel-drive
- Platform: Nissan D platform
- Related: Infiniti QX60 (L51)

Powertrain
- Engine: Gasoline: 2.0 L KR20DDET VC-Turbo I4
- Transmission: 9-speed ZF 9HP automatic

Dimensions
- Wheelbase: 114.2 in (2,900 mm)
- Length: 198.7 in (5,047 mm)
- Width: 78.0 in (1,981 mm)
- Height: 69.7 in (1,770 mm)

Chronology
- Predecessor: Infiniti QX70

The Infiniti QX65 is a mid-size luxury crossover SUV with a sloping fastback roofline produced by Nissan’s luxury brand, Infiniti. It was unveiled in the United States on March 26, 2026, as Infiniti’s first all-new nameplate since 2021, and entered production in April 2026 for the 2027 model year. The QX65 is closely related to the three-row Infiniti QX60, but uses a two-row, five-seat layout and a more dramatically styled coupé-SUV body.

== Overview ==
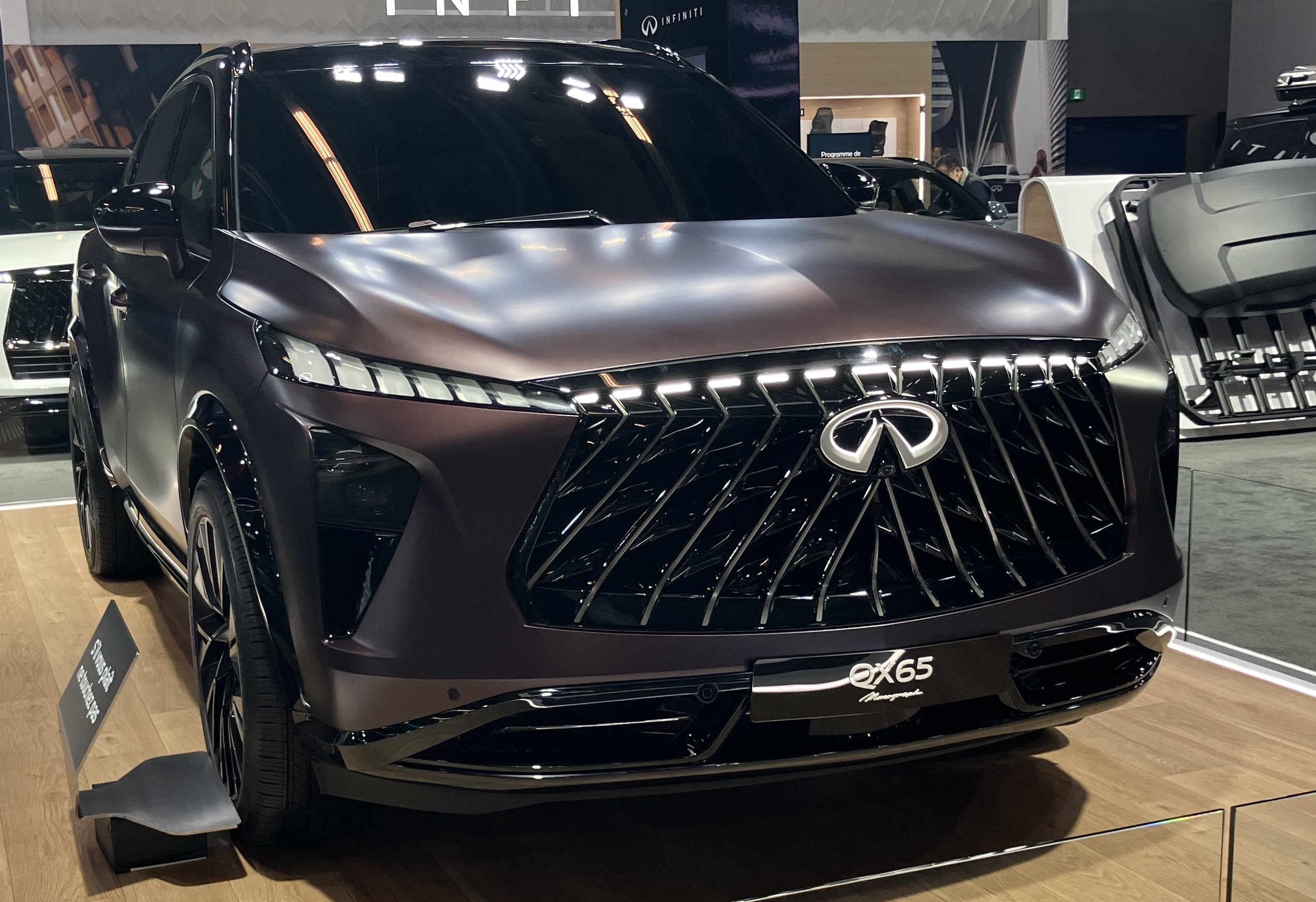
Infiniti QX65 Monograph concept

The QX65 was developed to revive the sporty, expressive character associated with the earlier Infiniti FX, while offering the practicality expected of a contemporary luxury crossover. Infiniti positions it as a two-row midsize luxury SUV that combines a fastback silhouette with a spacious cargo area, a technology-focused cabin, and standard all-wheel drive.

The vehicle is manufactured alongside the QX60 at Nissan’s Smyrna, Tennessee assembly plant. It reached United States retailers in early summer 2026, with a starting manufacturer’s suggested retail price of US$53,990 for the entry-level LUXE grade. Infiniti also indicated that the QX65 was expected to reach Middle Eastern markets by the end of 2026.

== Design ==
The QX65’s exterior is defined by a long, arched roofline that slopes continuously into a muscular rear haunch, creating a fastback or “coupé SUV” profile. Infiniti says the design is inspired by the spirit of the original FX, a model noted for blending SUV utility with sports-car-like proportions. The front end carries Infiniti’s contemporary grille and lighting design, while the rear features a wide stance intended to emphasize stability and presence.

The model is offered in three grades: LUXE, SPORT, and AUTOGRAPH. LUXE and SPORT models use 20-inch wheels, while the top AUTOGRAPH grade receives 21-inch machined alloy wheels. The SPORT grade adds a sportier grille insert, black exterior trim, gloss-black model emblems, and distinctive 20-inch black alloy wheels; the AUTOGRAPH substitutes more conventional luxury detailing, including satin-chrome window surrounds and open-pore wood interior trim.

A notable launch color is Sunfire Red, a tri-coat paint finish containing gold-coated glass flakes. Infiniti states that the finish uses a red base coat, a transparent mid-coat containing the reflective flakes, and a clear topcoat; the color was one of nine exterior choices at launch.

== Powertrain ==
Every QX65 is powered by a turbocharged 2.0-litre VC-Turbo inline-four engine producing 268 hp (200 kW) and 286 lb⋅ft (388 N⋅m) of torque. The VC-Turbo unit is designed to vary its compression ratio, allowing the engine to balance responsiveness and efficiency depending on driving conditions.

Power is sent through a nine-speed automatic transmission with standard paddle shifters and an Intelligent All-Wheel Drive system. Infiniti rates the QX65 to tow up to 6,000 lb (2,722 kg) when properly equipped. In the United States, the EPA estimates fuel economy at 20 mpg city, 26 mpg highway, and 22 mpg combined.

== Interior and technology ==
The cabin is configured with two rows and seating for five passengers. Its dashboard and interface layout closely resemble that of the related QX60, but the absence of a third row allows Infiniti to emphasize rear-seat comfort and cargo flexibility. The second row retains sliding functionality, enabling owners to prioritize legroom or luggage space without folding the seatbacks completely.

Cargo capacity is rated at 35.8 cu ft (1,014 L) behind the second row and 67.7 cu ft (1,917 L) with the rear seats folded. The QX65 also includes a 54-litre underfloor storage compartment, which Infiniti describes as the largest in its segment.

All trims feature dual 12.3-inch displays: one serves as a reconfigurable digital instrument cluster, while the other controls infotainment. The system includes Google built-in, Google Assistant, wireless Apple CarPlay, wireless Android Auto, four USB-C ports, and a Qi2 wireless charging pad. Audio equipment ranges from an 11-speaker system in the Luxe to a 16-speaker Klipsch Premium system in the Sport trim and a 20-speaker Klipsch Reference Premiere system in the Autograph trim.

== Safety and driver assistance ==
The QX65 includes a broad suite of standard driver-assistance systems, including Predictive Forward Collision Warning, Blind Spot Warning, Blind Spot Intervention, Lane Departure Prevention, High Beam Assist, rear parking sensors, and ProPILOT Assist. These systems are intended to support the driver rather than replace active supervision.

Optional technology varies by grade and package. Available equipment includes a Smart Rear View Mirror, a 10.8-inch colour head-up display, a 3D Around View Monitor, front wide-view and invisible-hood camera functions, and ProPILOT Assist 2.1, which can provide hands-off driving assistance in certain limited freeway conditions while requiring the driver to remain attentive.

== Trim levels and pricing ==
Grade	U.S. MSRP	Notable equipment
LUXE	US$53,990	VC-Turbo engine, Intelligent AWD, 20-inch wheels, dual 12.3-inch displays, Google built-in, panoramic sunroof, heated front seats, ProPILOT Assist.
SPORT	US$55,690	Blacked-out sport styling, climate-controlled front seats, 16-speaker Klipsch Premium audio, 3D Around View Monitor and related camera features.
AUTOGRAPH	US$62,590	21-inch wheels, semi-aniline leather seats, massaging front seats, heated rear seats, head-up display, Smart Rear View Mirror, and 20-speaker Klipsch Reference Premiere audio.

== See also ==
- Infiniti QX60
- Infiniti FX
- Coupé SUV
- Nissan
