= Renault–Nissan D platform =

Nissan D platform

Overview
- Manufacturer: Renault–Nissan Alliance
- Production: 2006–present

Body and chassis
- Class: Mid-size cars
- Layout: FF; F4
- Body style: Various

Chronology
- Predecessor: Nissan FF-L platform
- Successor: Renault–Nissan Common Module Family C/D

The D platform is a front wheel drive automobile platform developed for mid-size cars from the Renault–Nissan Alliance since 2006. It is slightly smaller than its predecessor, the Nissan FF-L platform.

== Models ==
- 2007+ Nissan Altima (L32, L33 and L34)
- 2007+ Renault Laguna III
- 2007+ Nissan Murano (Z51)
- 2008+ Nissan Maxima (A35)
- 2009+ Renault Samsung SM5 (L43)
- 2010+ Renault Latitude
- 2010+ Nissan Elgrand
- 2010+ Nissan Quest
- 2011+ Renault Samsung New SM7 (L47)
- 2013+ Nissan Teana (L33)
- 2013+ Infiniti JX35/Infiniti QX60 (L50)
- 2013+ Nissan Pathfinder (R52)
- 2015+ Nissan Murano (Z52)
- 2015+ Nissan Maxima (A36)
- 2016+ Venucia T90
- 2019+ Nissan Teana (L34)
- 2022+ Infiniti QX60 (L51)
- 2022+ Nissan Pathfinder (R53)
- 2024+ Nissan Murano (Z53)
- 2026+ Infiniti QX65
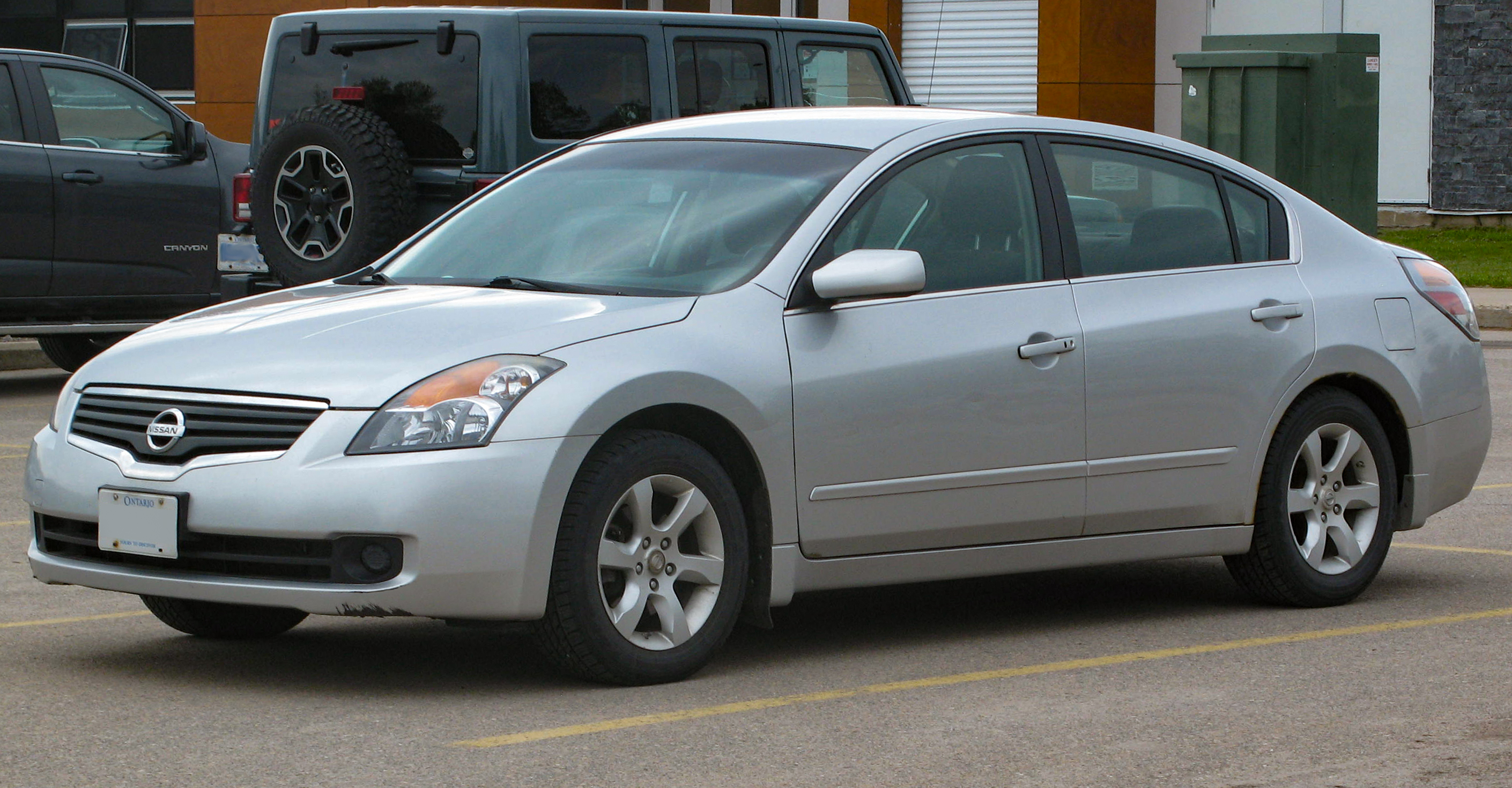
Nissan Altima (L32)

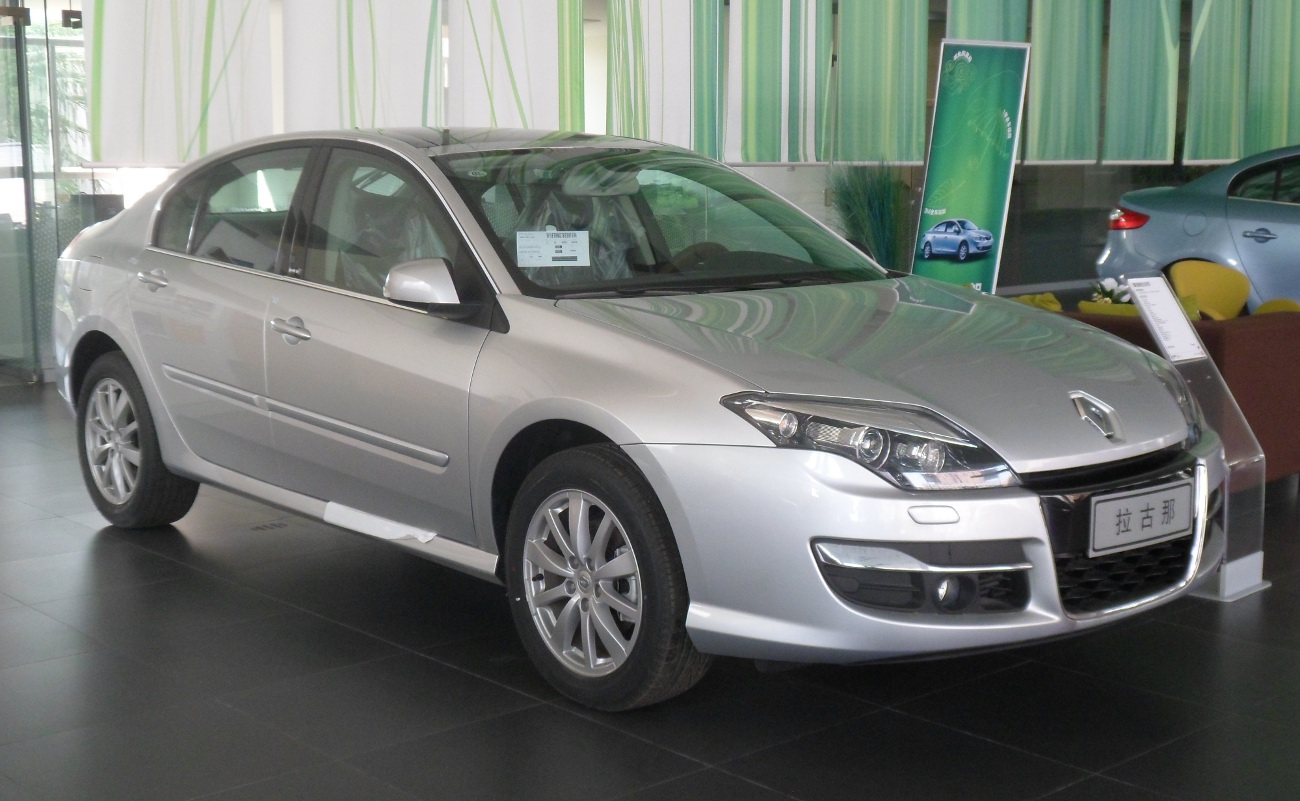
Renault Laguna III

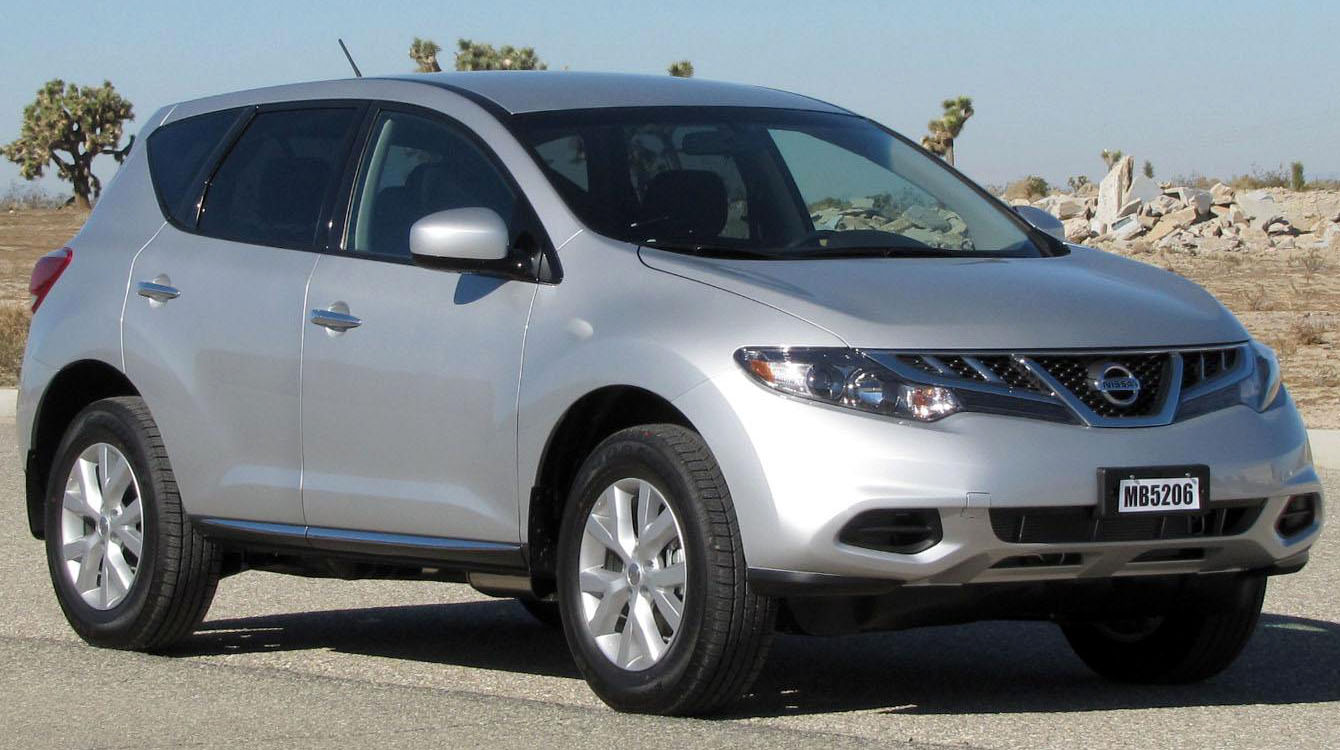
Nissan Murano (Z51)

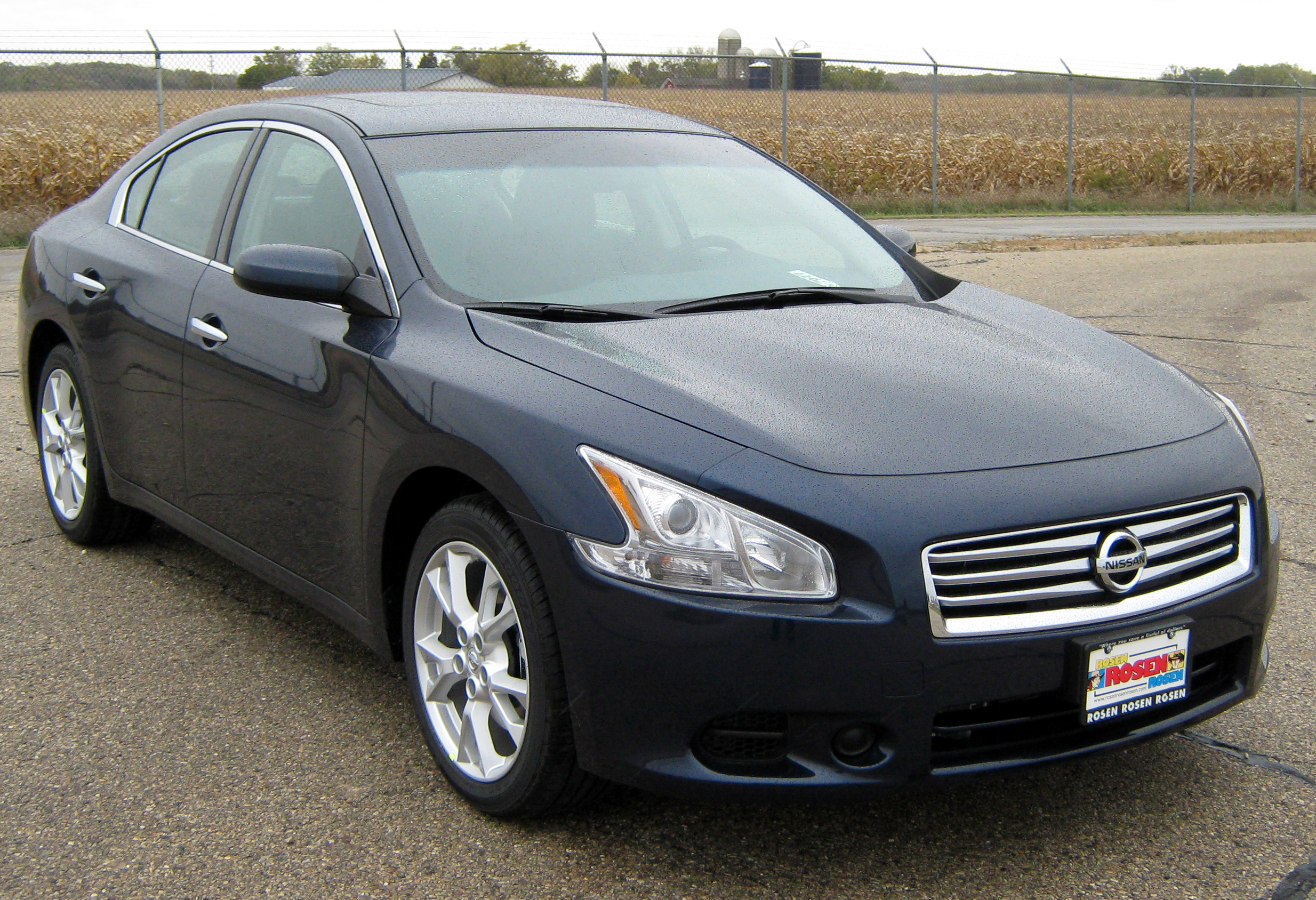
Nissan Maxima (A35)

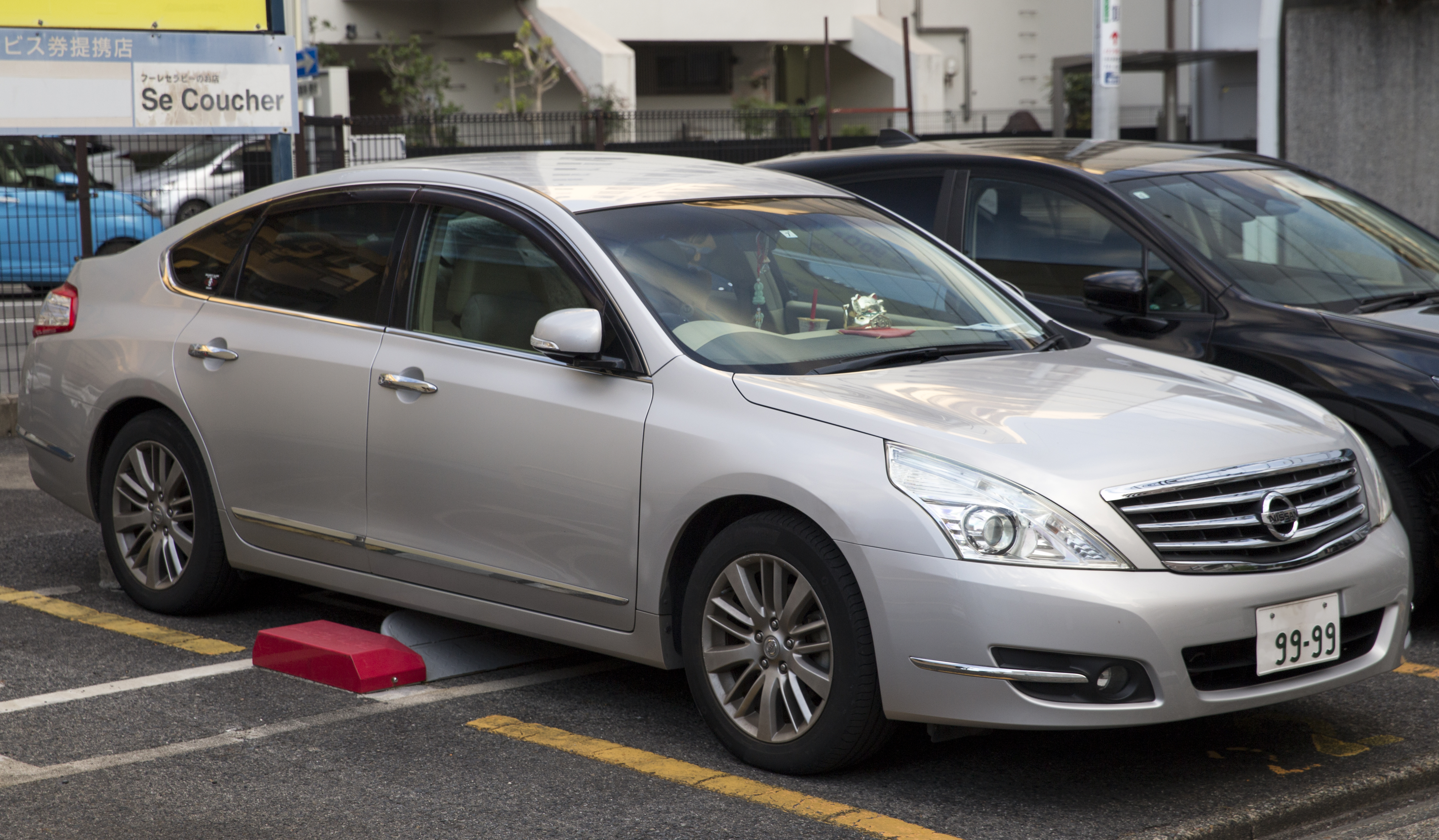
Nissan Teana (J32)

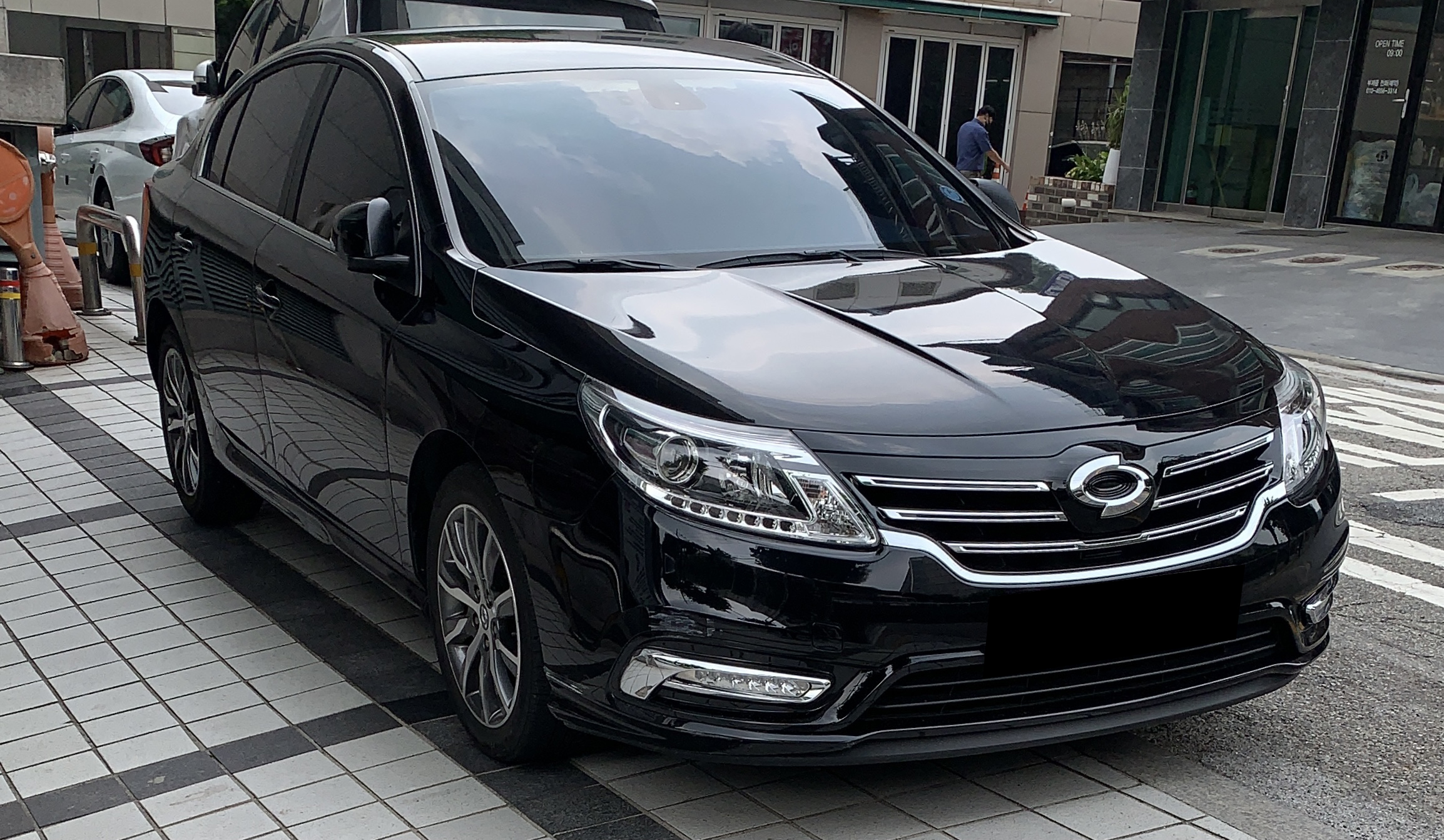
Renault Samsung SM5 (L43)

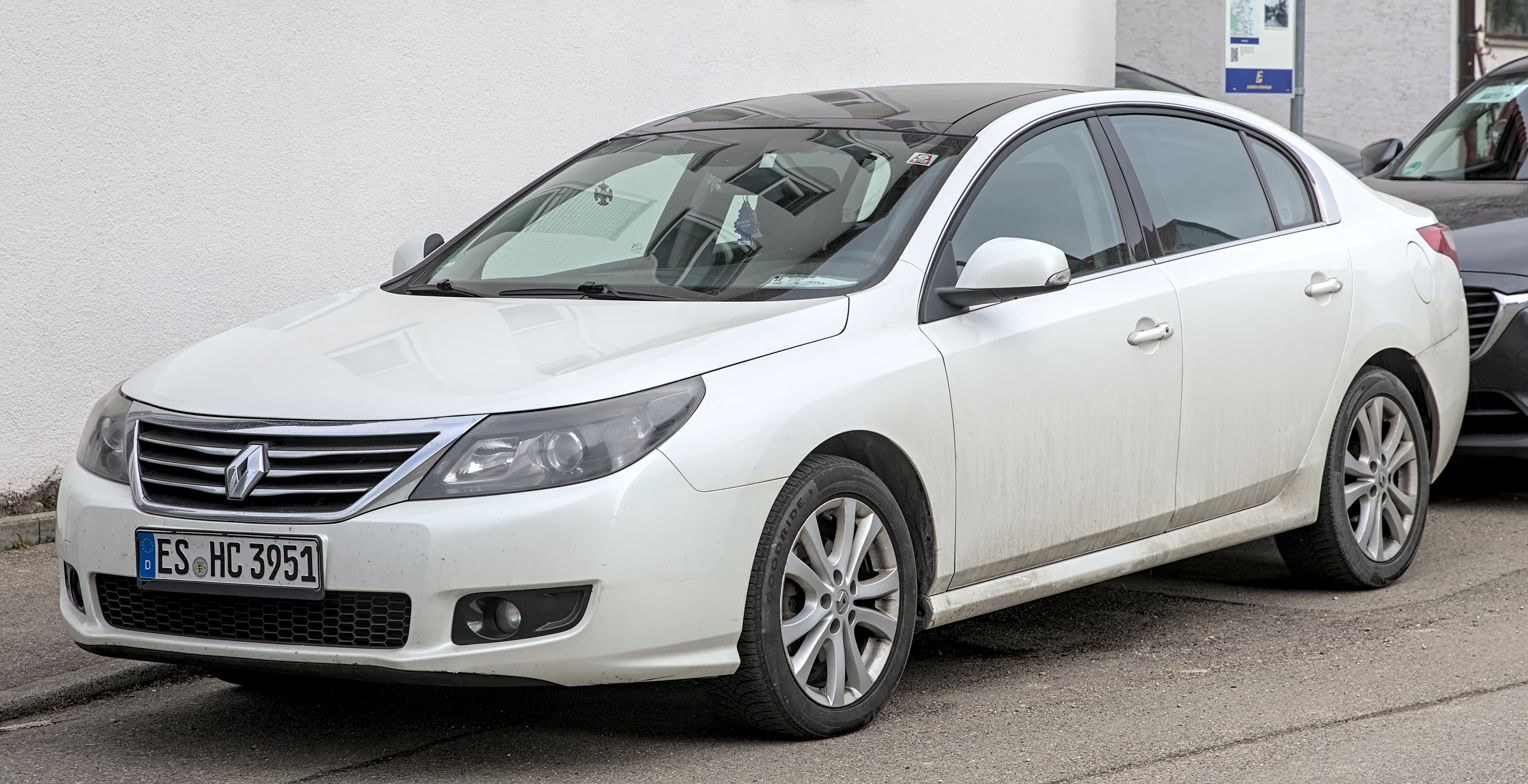
Renault Latitude

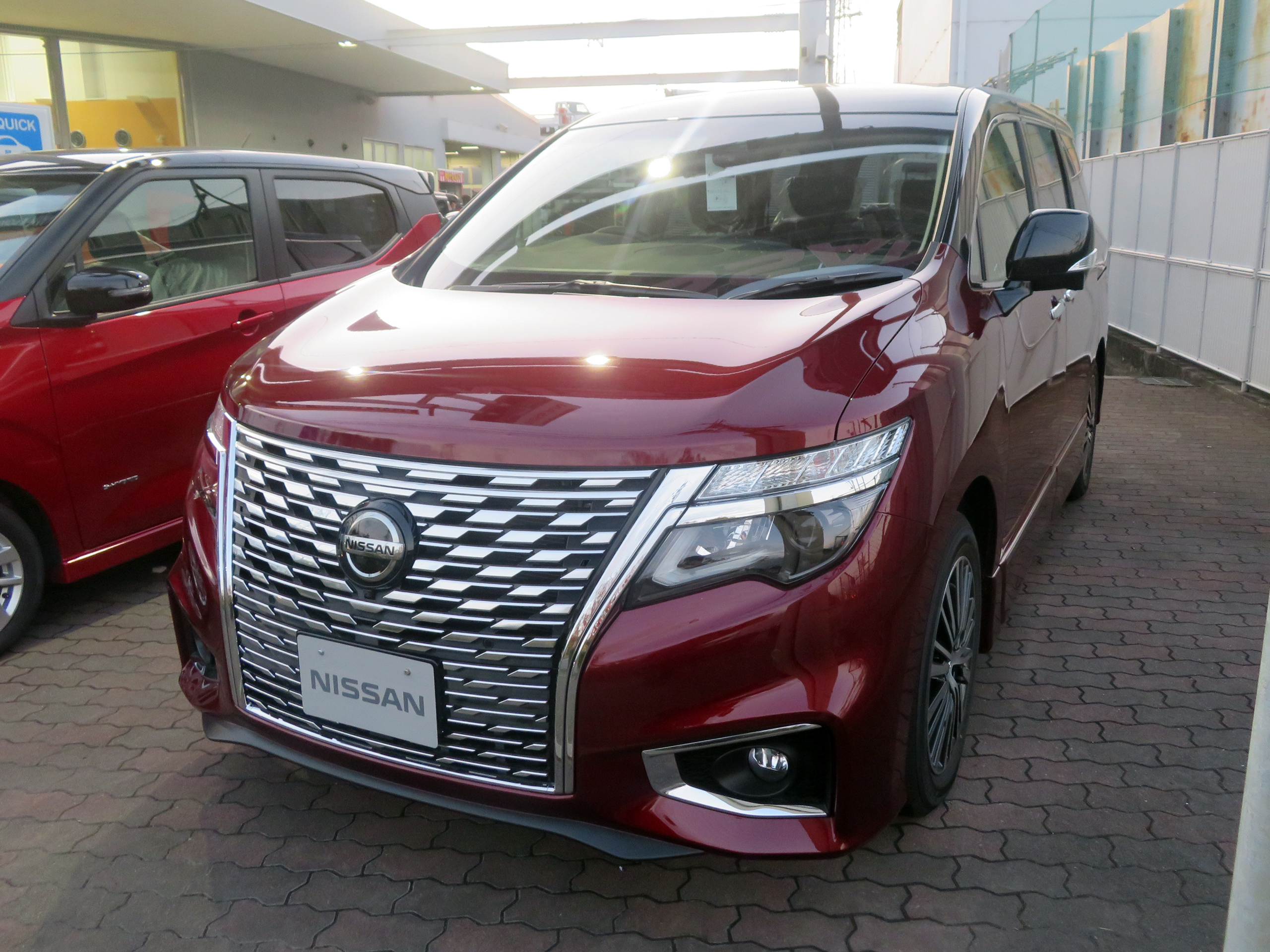
Nissan Elgrand

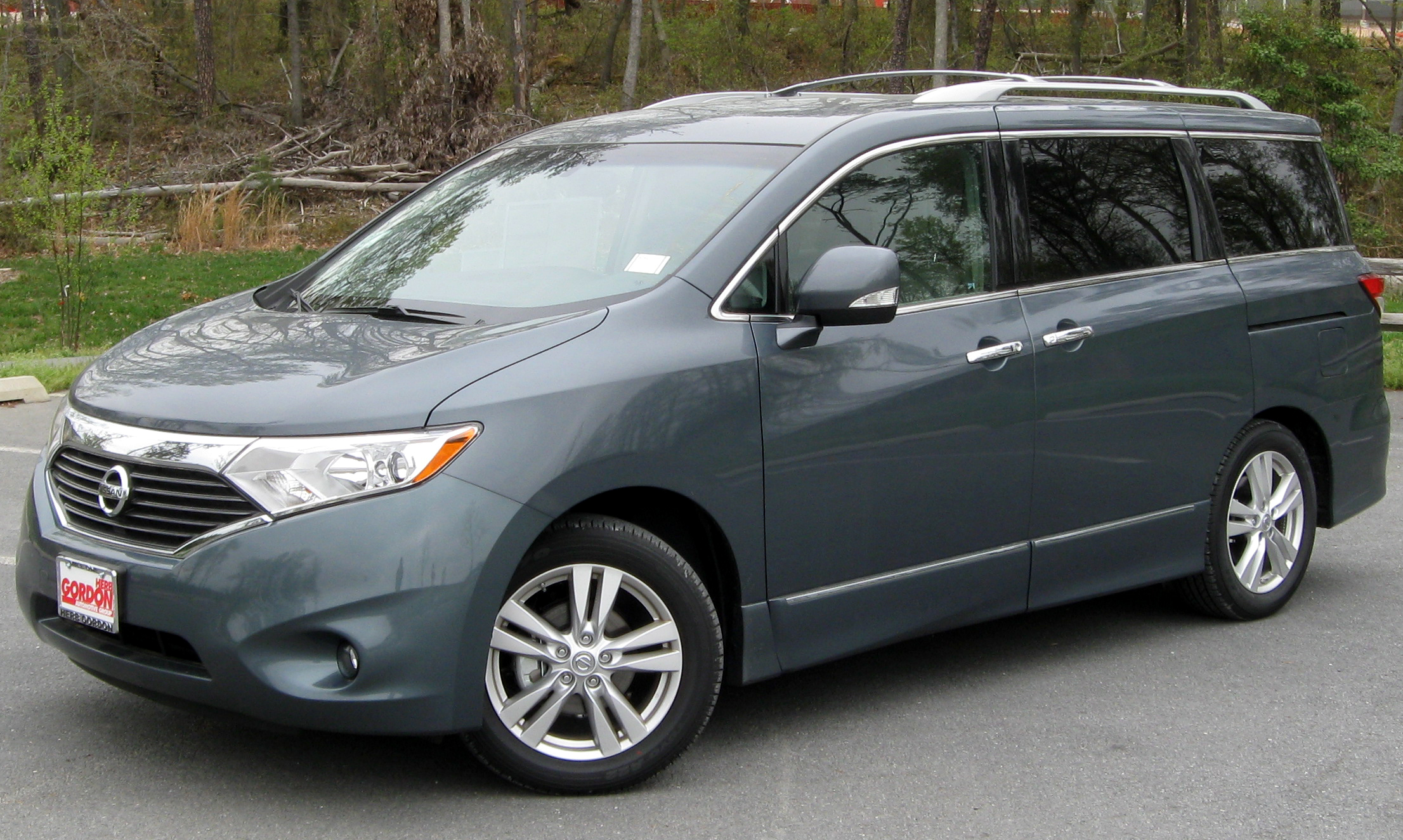
Nissan Quest

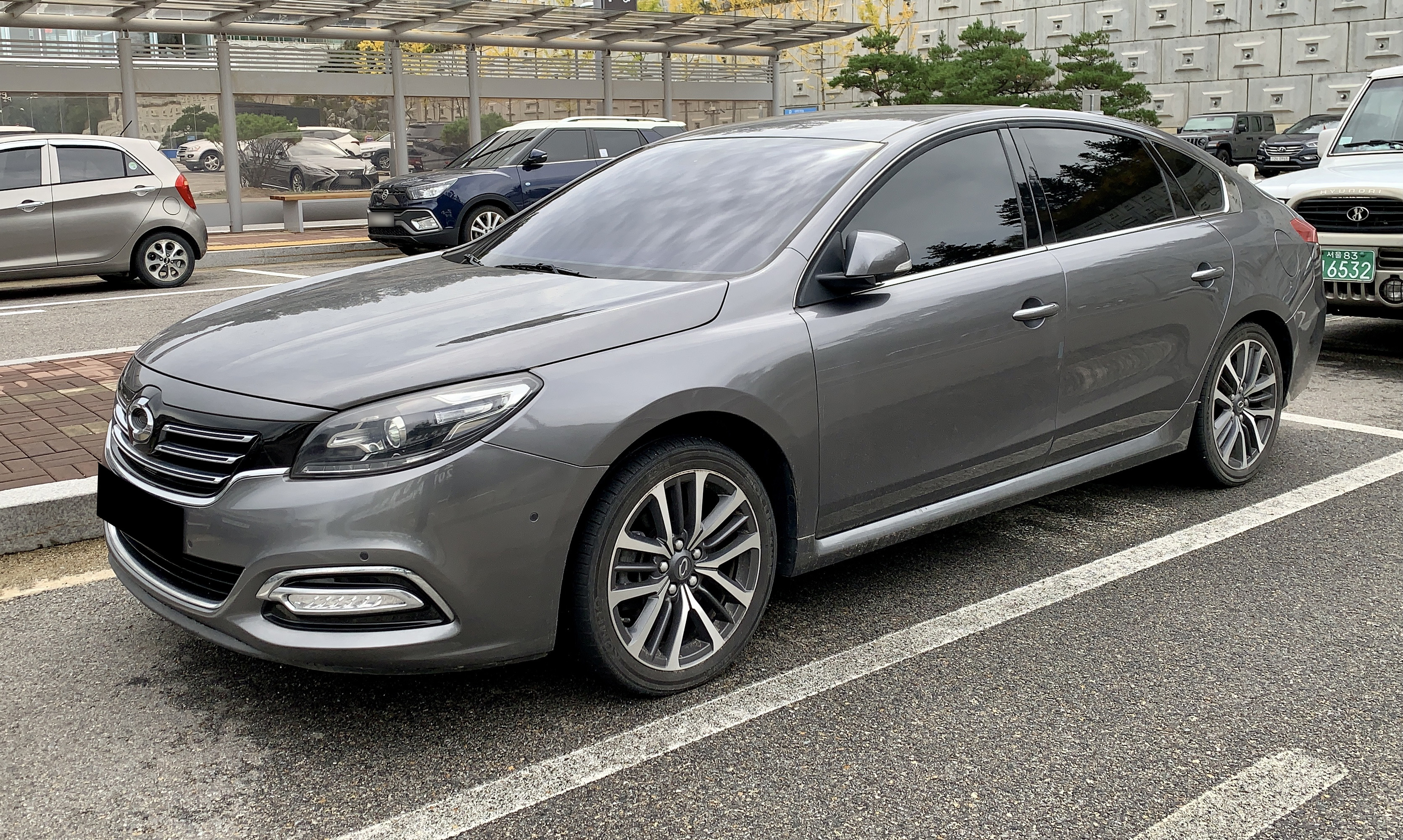
Renault Samsung New SM7 (L47)

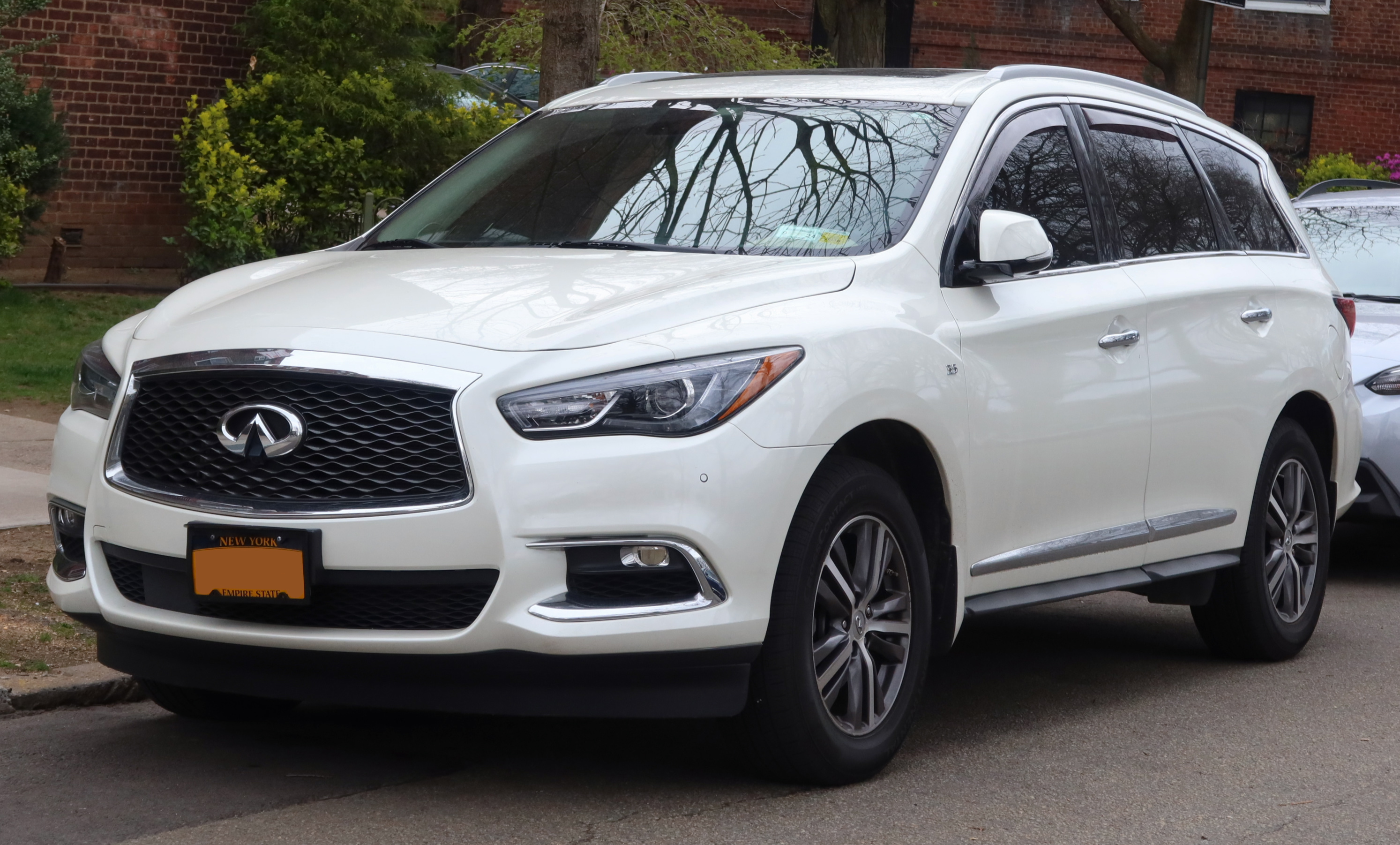
Infiniti JX35/QX60 (L50)

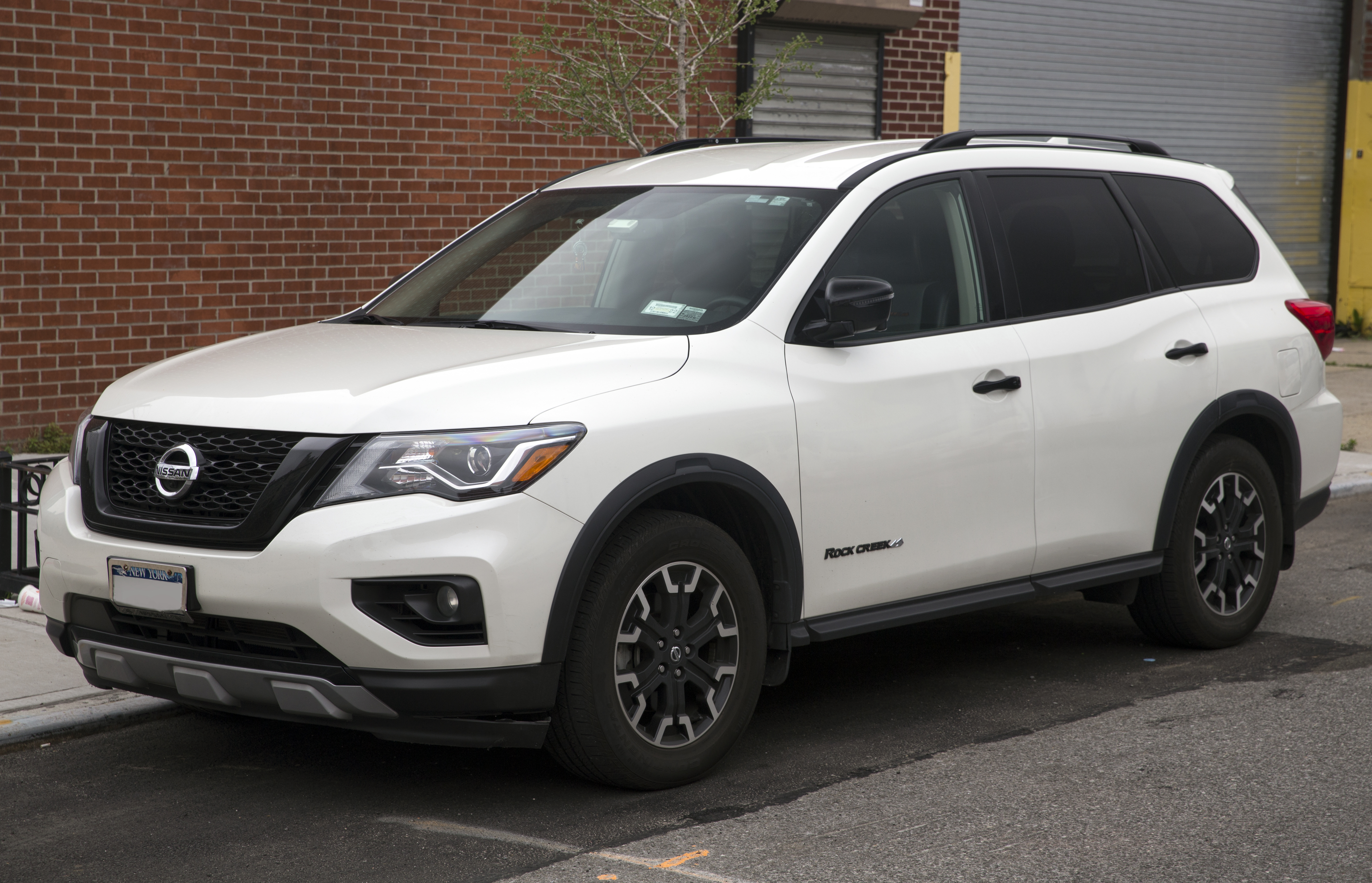
Nissan Pathfinder (R52)

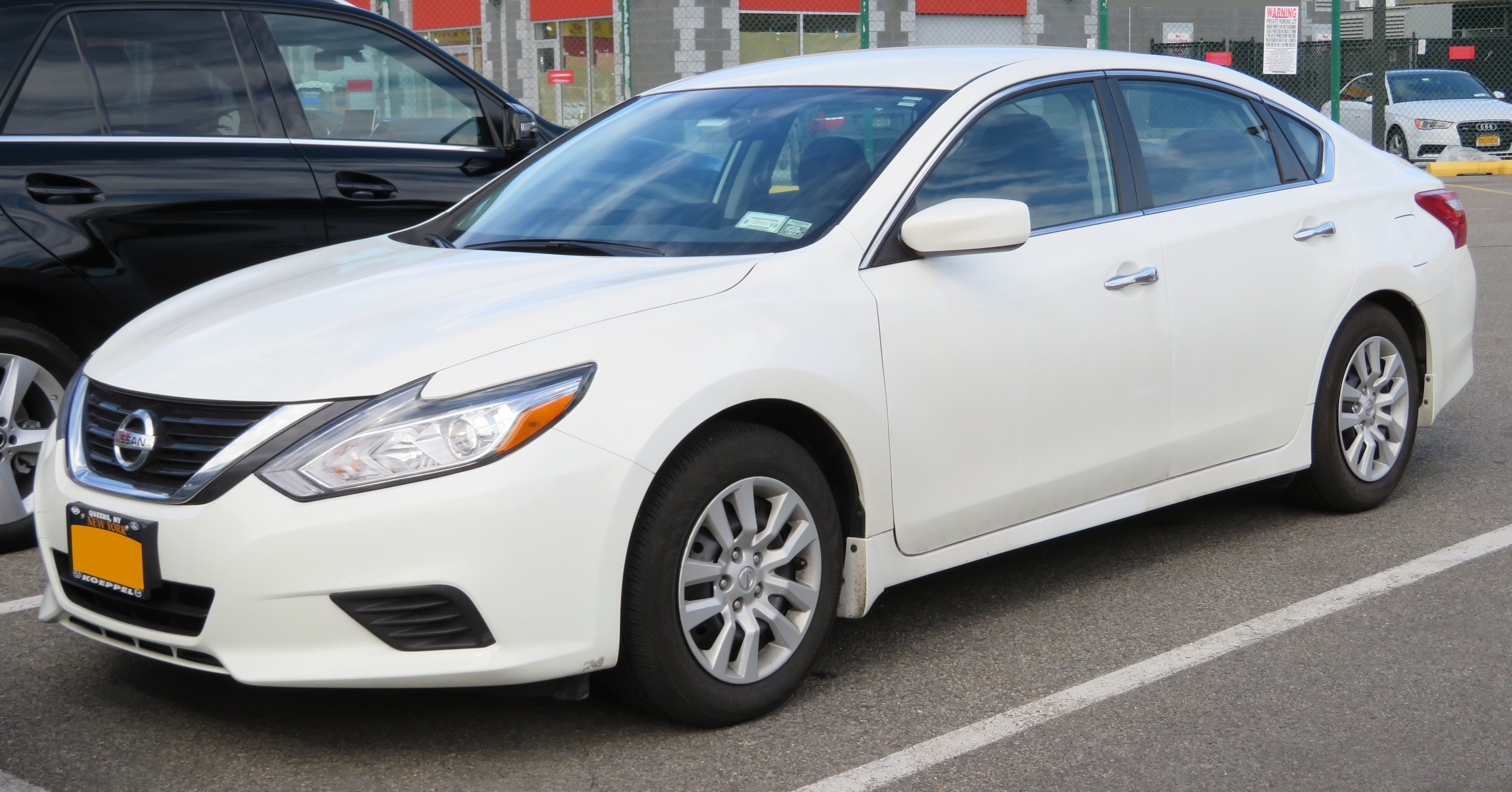
Nissan Teana/Altima (L33)

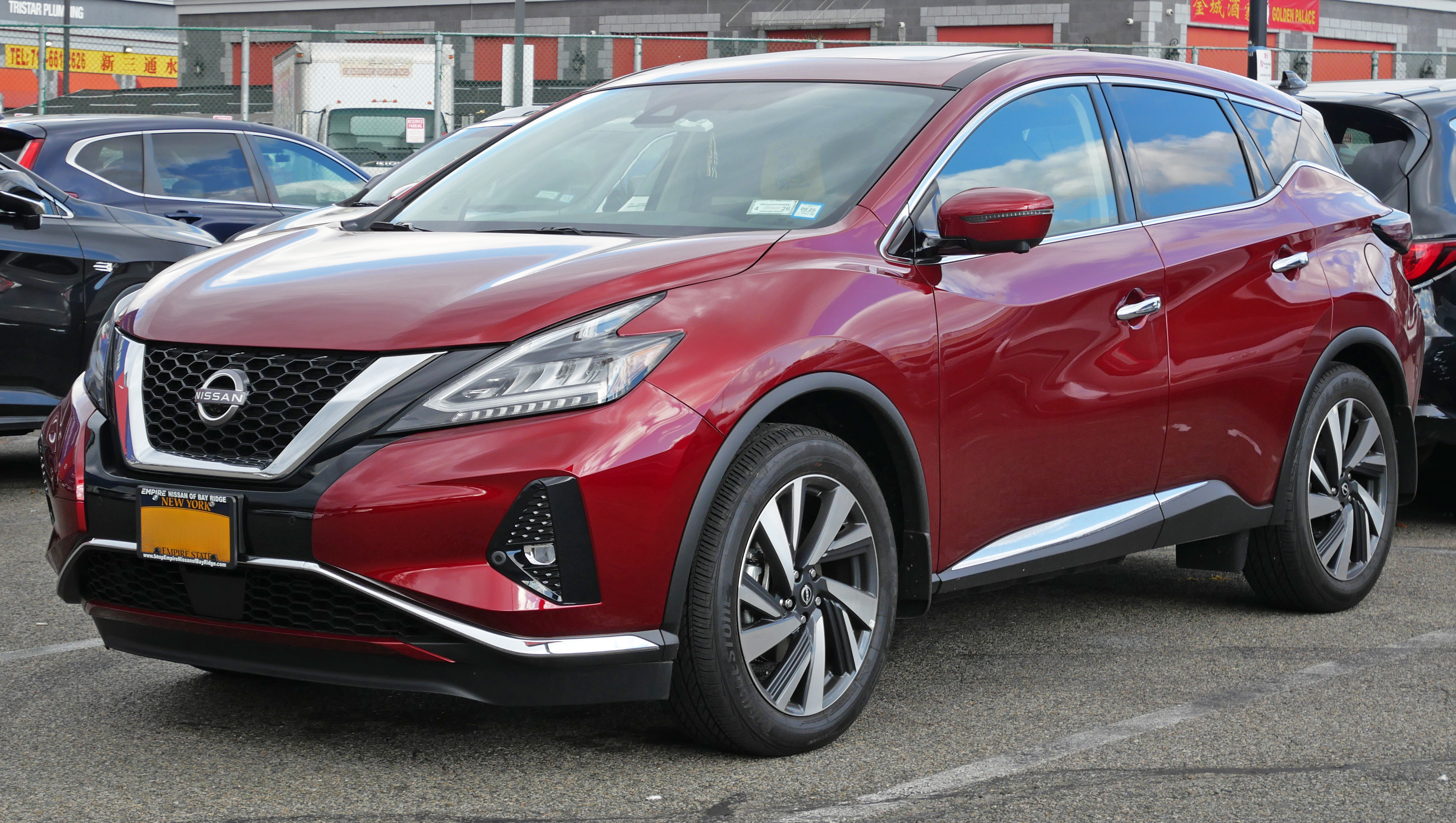
Nissan Murano (Z52)

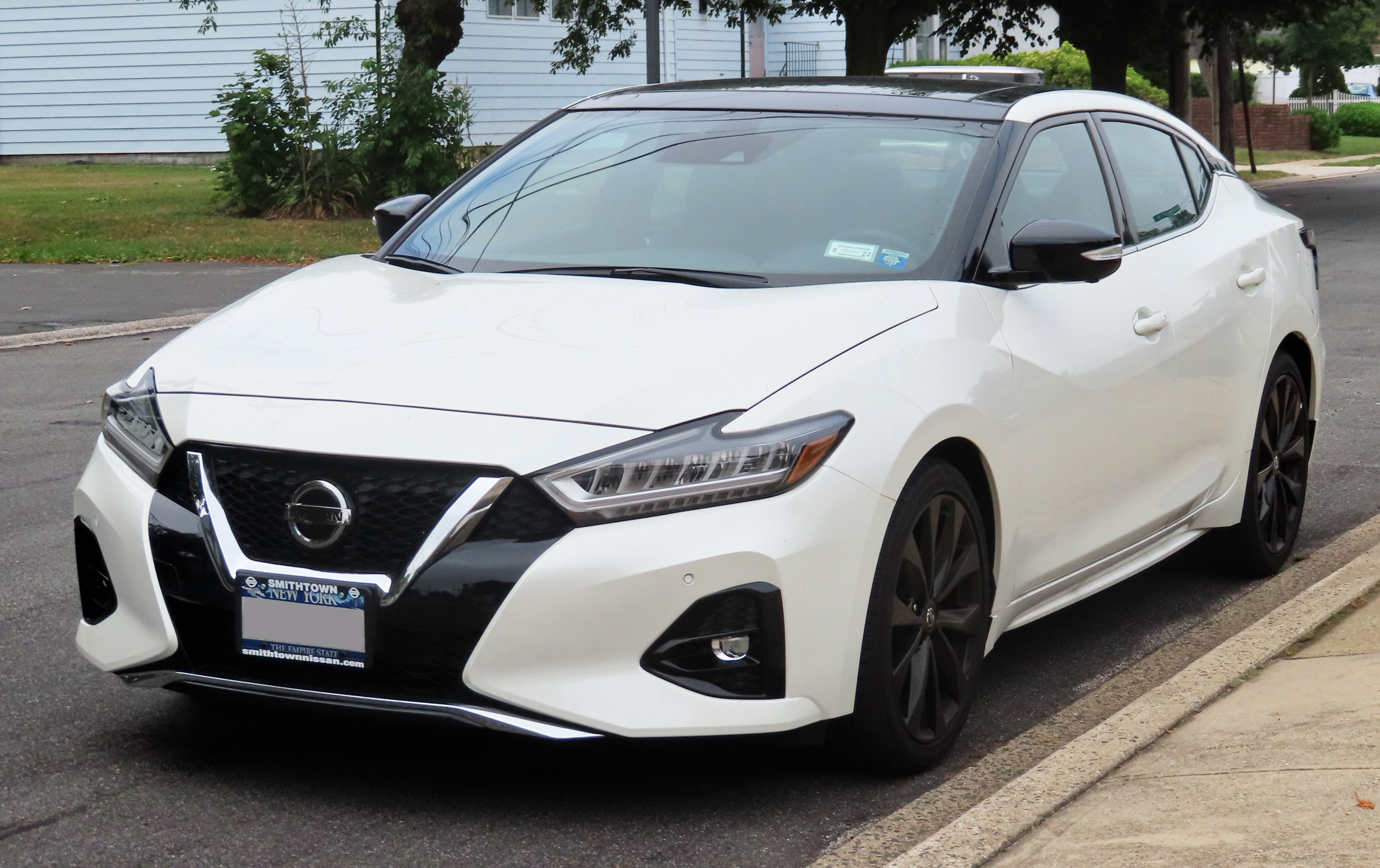
Nissan Maxima (A36)

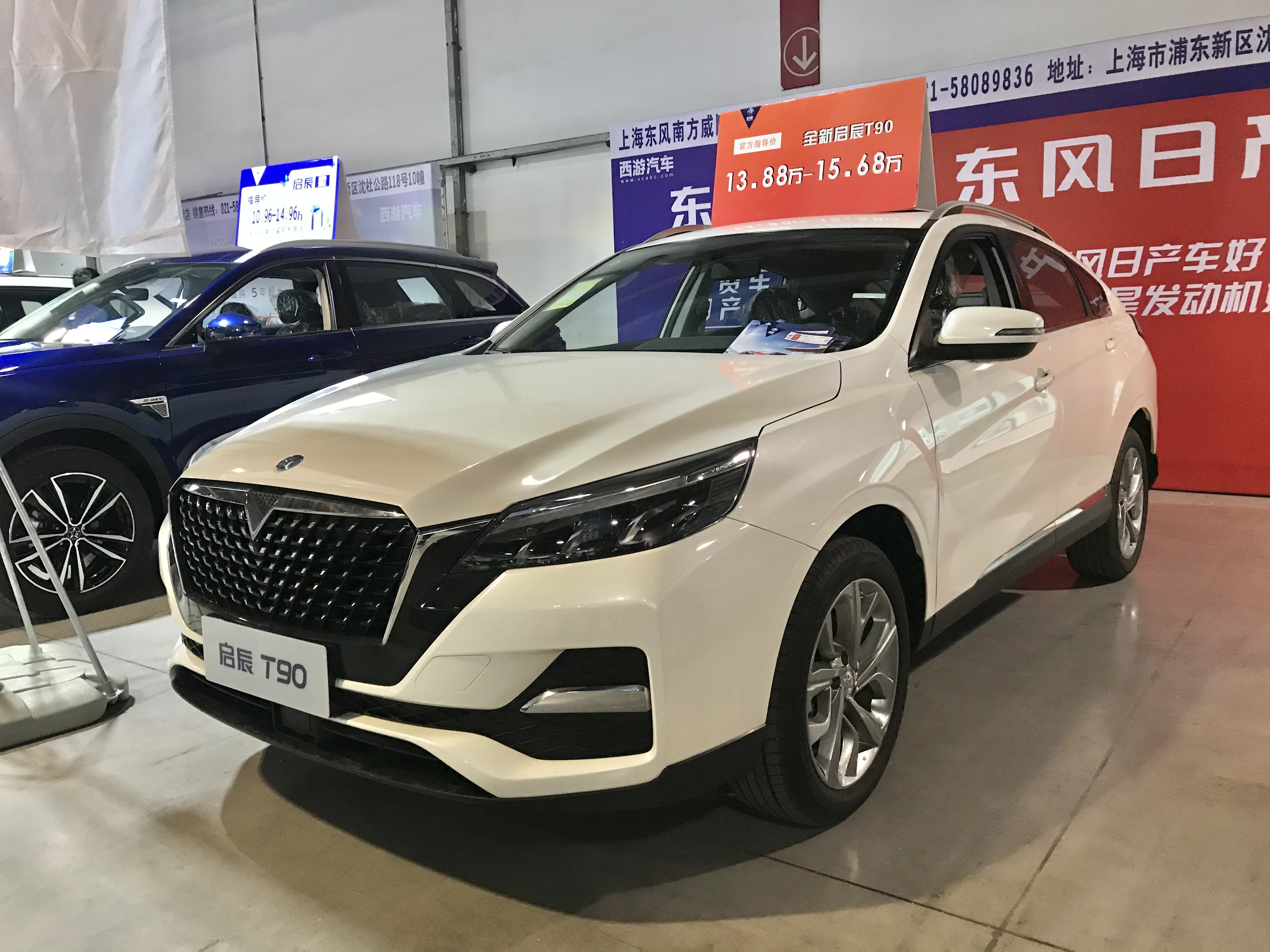
Venucia T90

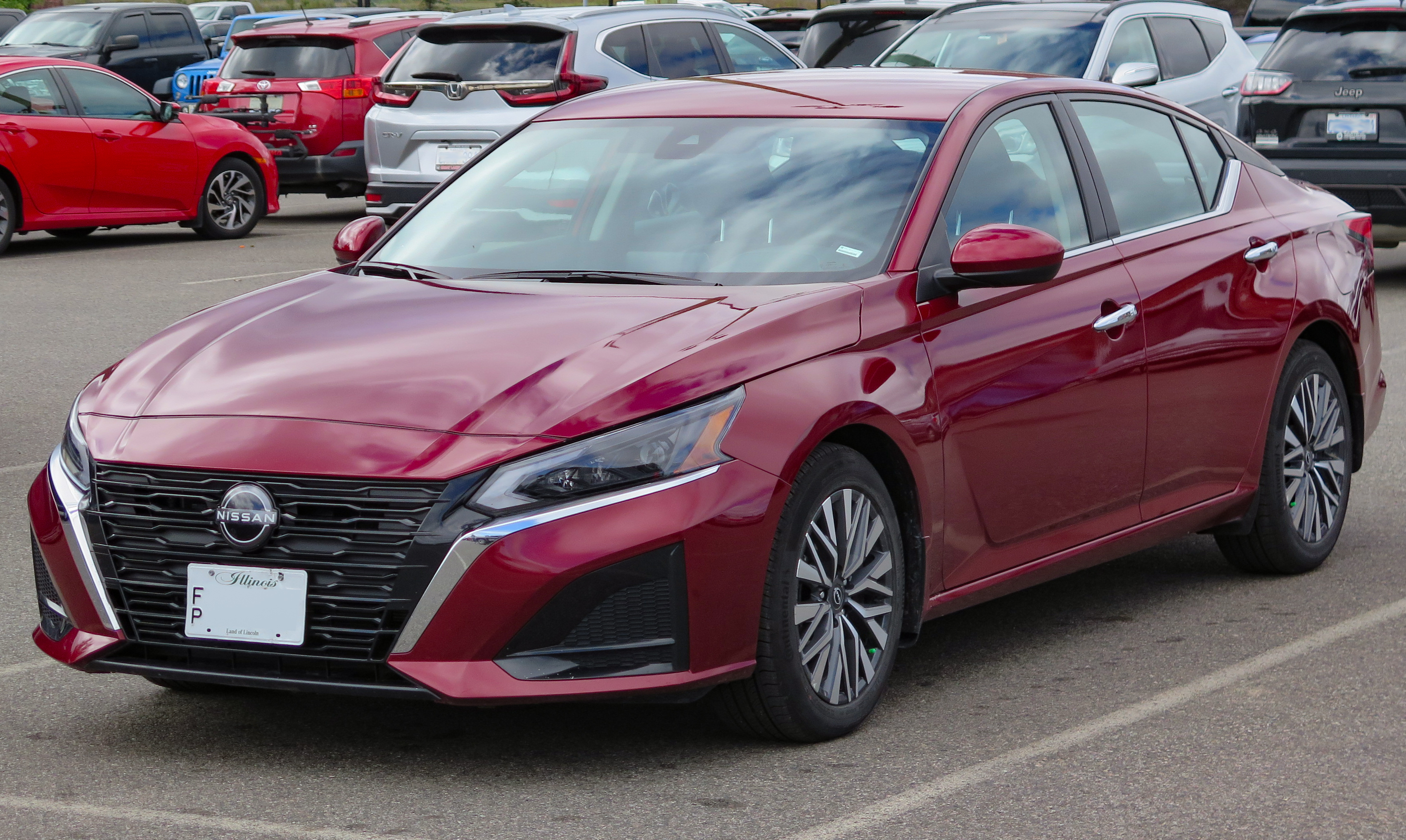
Nissan Altima (L34)

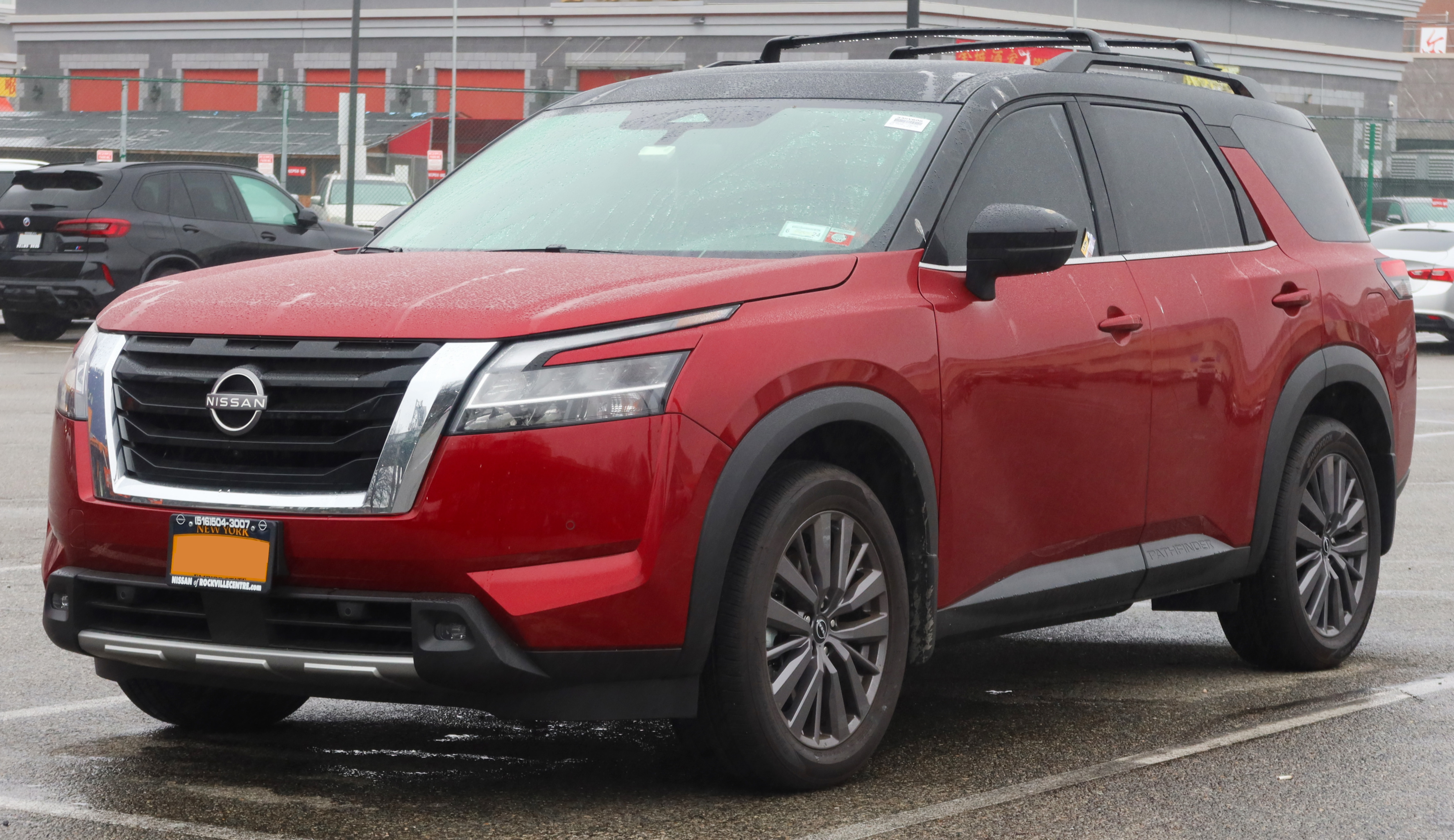
Nissan Pathfinder (R53)

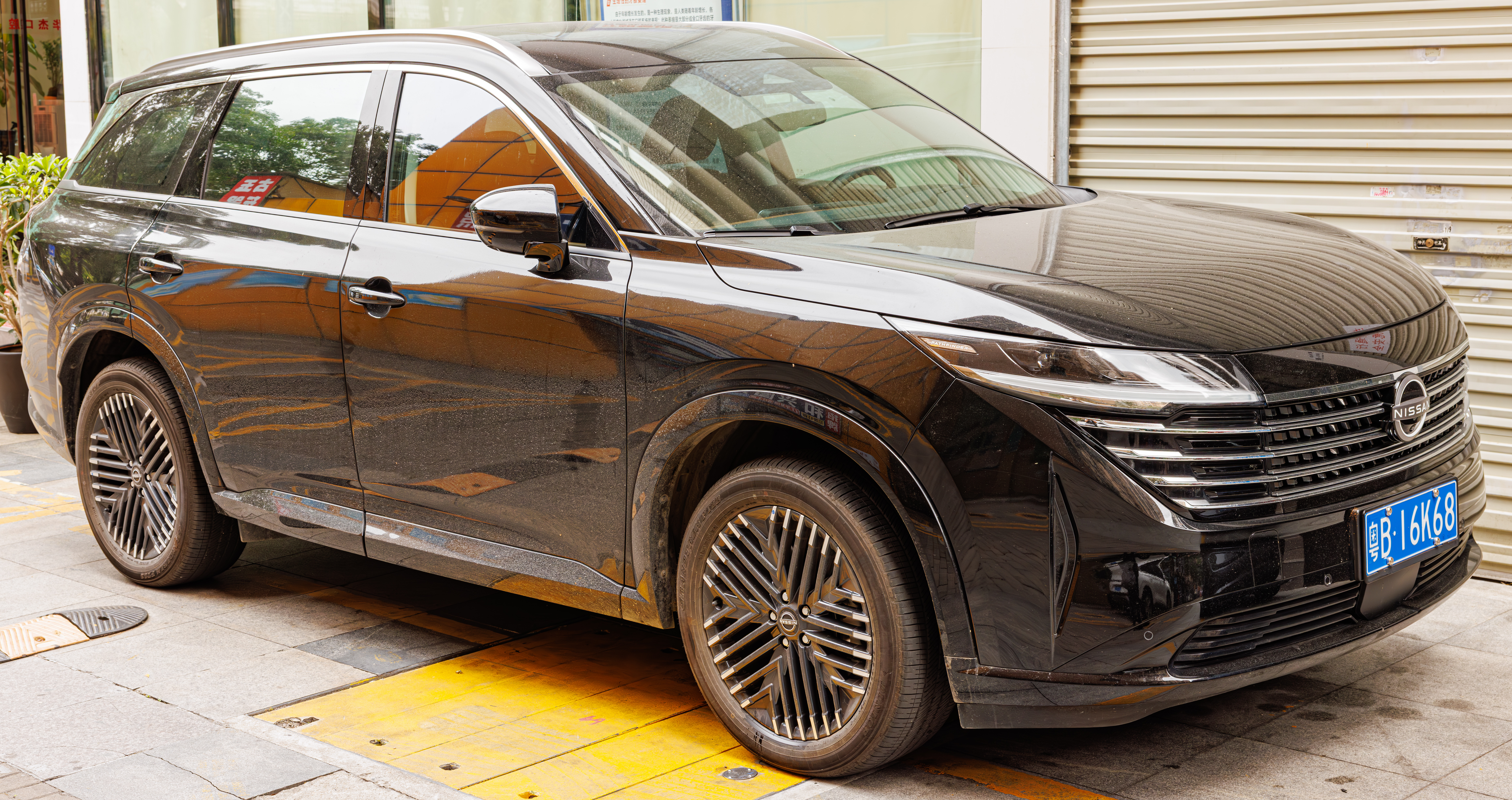
Nissan Pathfinder (R53, China)

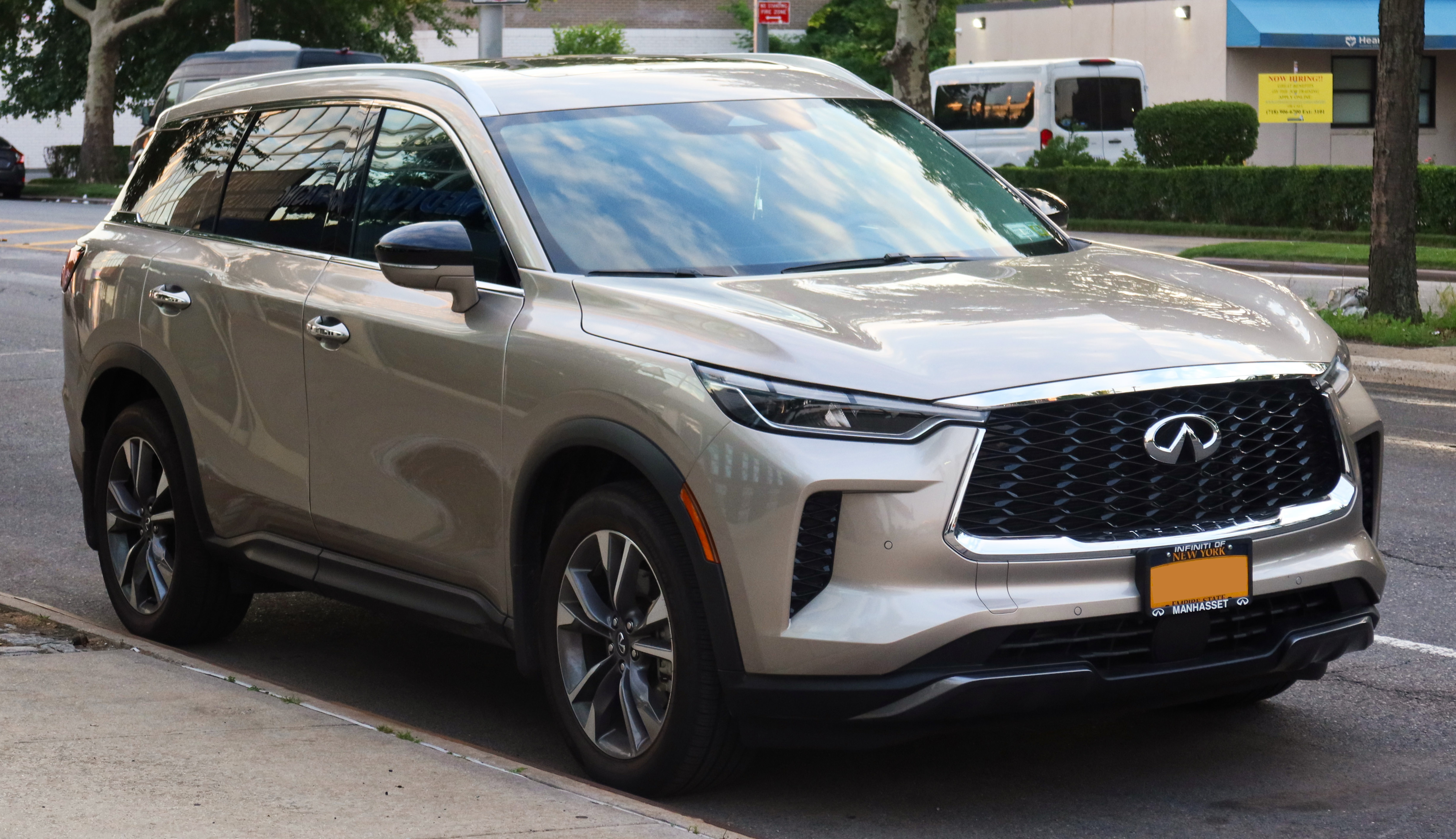
Infiniti QX60 (L51)

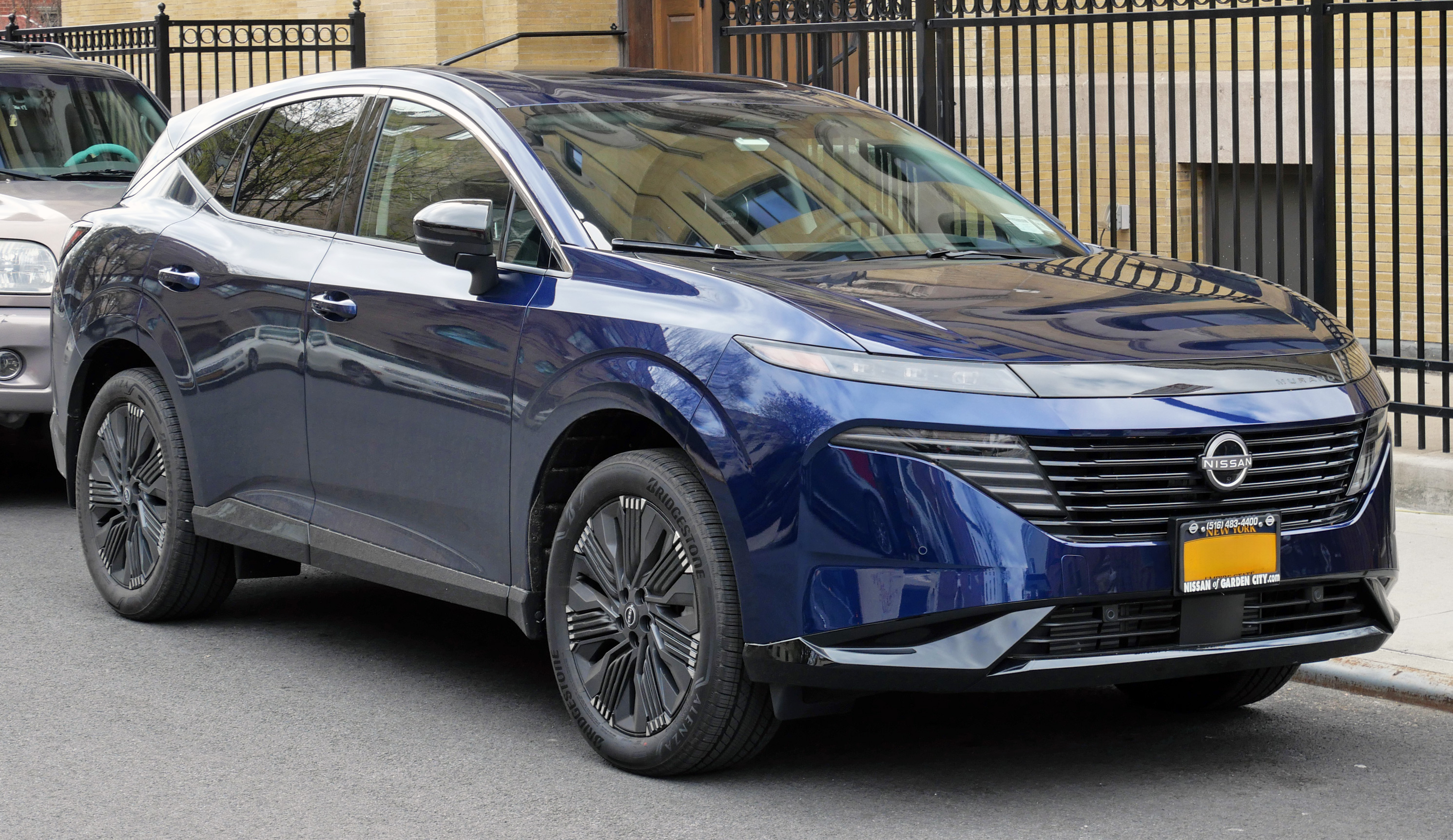
Nissan Murano (Z53)

Infiniti QX65
