= Infiniti QX60 =

Mid-size luxury crossover SUV

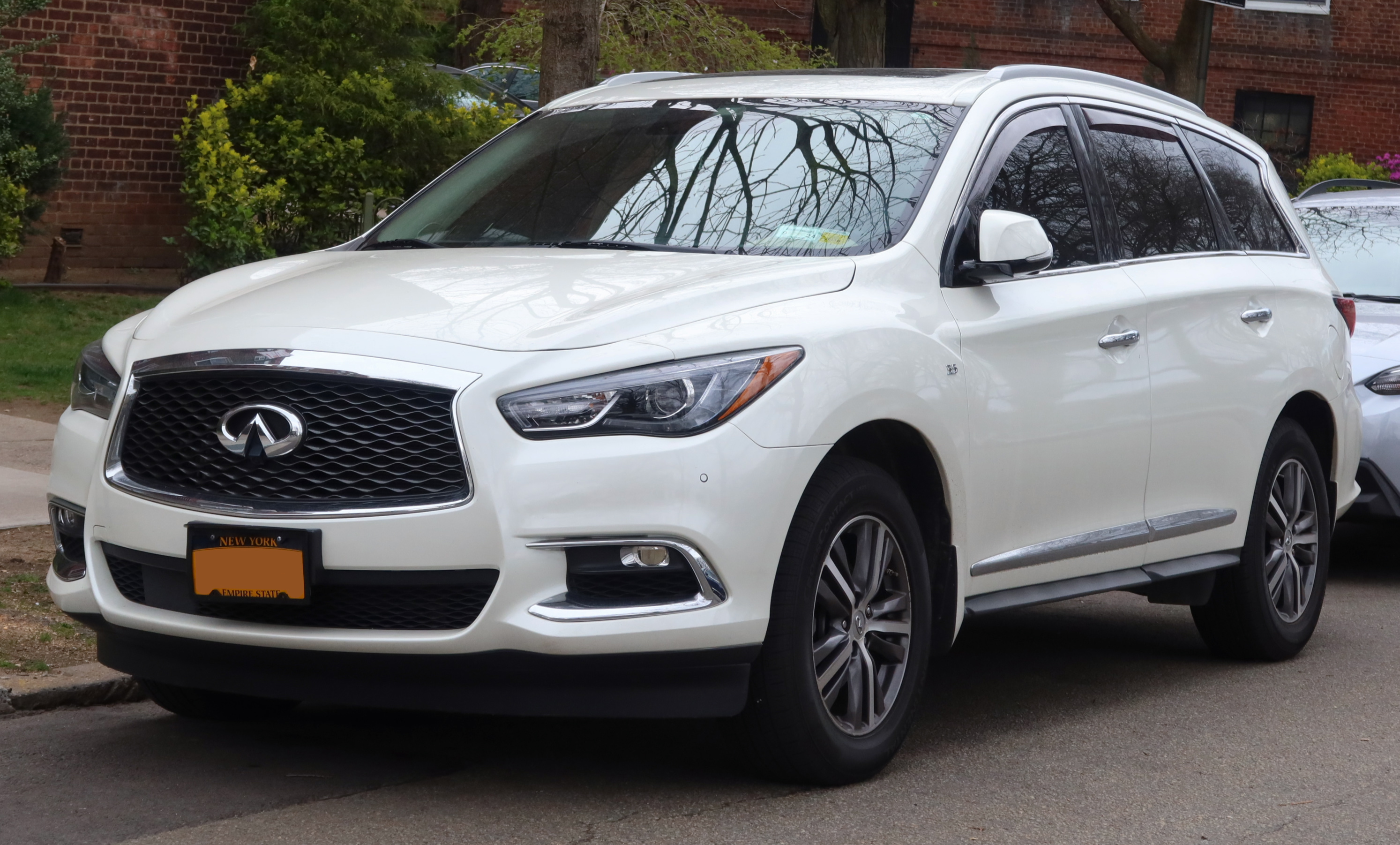
- 2017 Infiniti QX60 (L50)

Overview
- Manufacturer: Nissan
- Also called: Infiniti JX (2012–2013)
- Production: February 2012 – August 2013 (JX35); September 2013 – present (QX60)
- Model years: 2013 (JX35); 2014–present (QX60)

Body and chassis
- Class: Mid-size luxury crossover SUV
- Body style: 5-door SUV
- Layout: Front-engine, front-wheel-drive Front-engine, all-wheel-drive
- Related: Nissan Pathfinder

Chronology
- Predecessor: Infiniti QX4

The Infiniti QX60, called the Infiniti JX until the 2014 model year, is a mid-size luxury crossover SUV with three-row seating produced by Infiniti, the luxury vehicle division of Japanese automaker Nissan. It is underpinned by an elongated Nissan Murano platform also used by the Nissan Pathfinder.

In keeping with Infiniti's naming scheme for 2014, in which cars begin with Q and SUVs begin with QX, the JX was renamed to QX60. While the number previously denoted engine displacement (for example, 35=3.5L engine), the new number, 60, is largely to do with its place in the product lineup, with larger numbers usually corresponding to more expensive vehicles.

== First generation (L50; 2013) ==
First generation
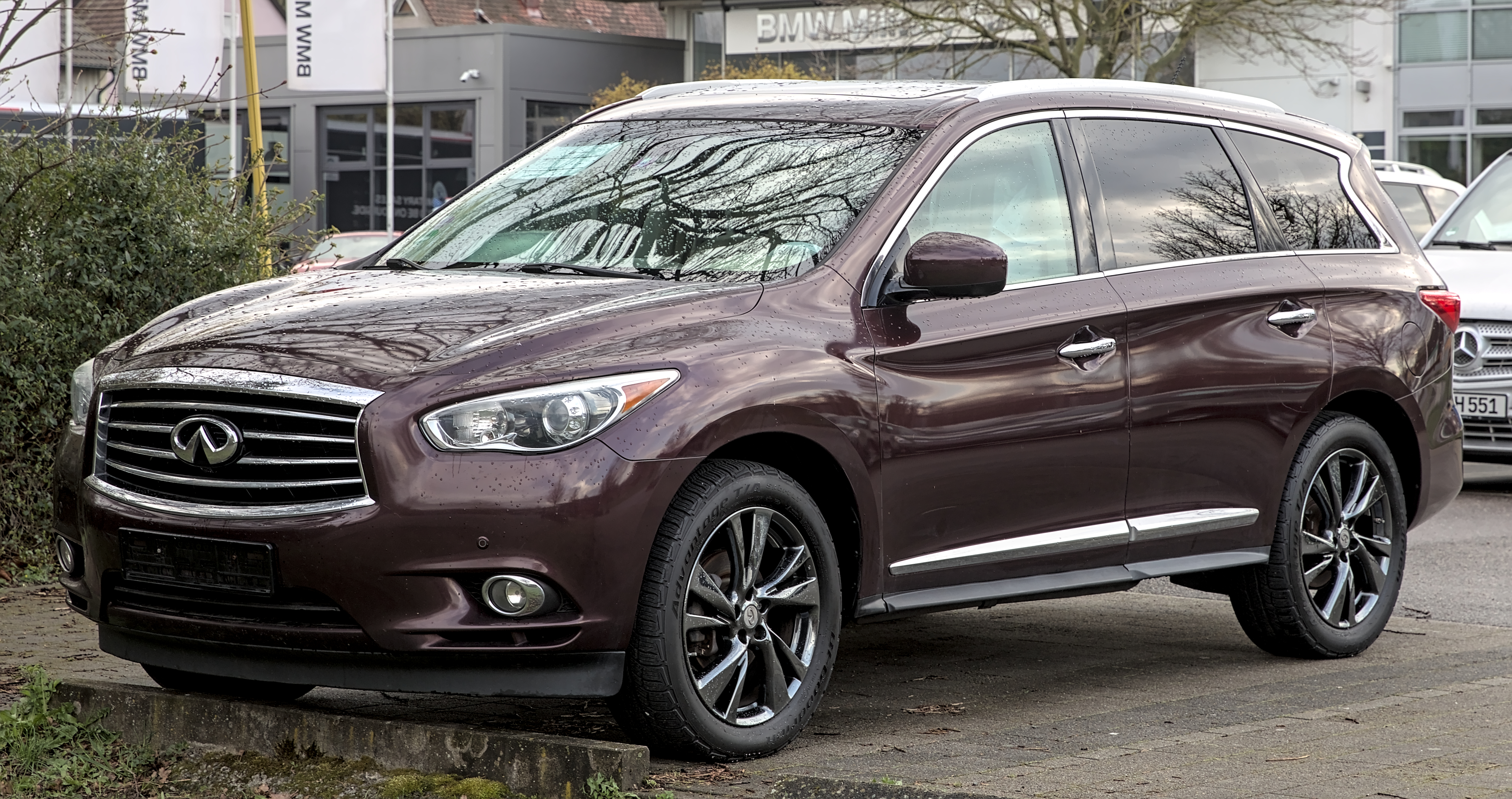
- 2013 Infiniti JX35

Overview
- Model code: L50
- Also called: Infiniti JX (2012–2013)
- Production: February 2012–2013 (JX); 2013–2020 (QX60); 2014–2017 (Hybrid)
- Model years: 2013 (JX35); 2014–2020; 2014–2017 (Hybrid)
- Assembly: United States: Smyrna, Tennessee (Nissan Smyrna Assembly Plant)
- Designer: Naoyuki Ohkoshi (2009)

Body and chassis
- Platform: Nissan D platform
- Related: Nissan Pathfinder (R52)

Powertrain
- Engine: Gasoline: 3.5 L VQ35DE V6; 3.5 L VQ35DD DI V6; Gasoline hybrid; 2.5 L QR25DER s/c I4
- Electric motor: 20 hp (15 kW) (Hybrid; 2015)
- Transmission: CVT
- Hybrid drivetrain: Parallel hybrid
- Battery: 0.6 kWh lithium ion (Hybrid)

Dimensions
- Wheelbase: 114.2 in (2,901 mm)
- Length: 200.1 in (5,083 mm)
- Width: 77.2 in (1,961 mm)
- Height: 67.8 in (1,722 mm)
- Curb weight: 4,280 lb (1,941 kg) (FWD); 4,419 lb (2,004 kg) (AWD); 4,625 lb (2,098 kg) (AWD hybrid)

The Infiniti JX35 was announced in April 2012 in the United States as a 2013 model. A concept version had been debuted at the 2011 Pebble Beach Concours d'Elegance event, while the production model was unveiled at the 2011 Los Angeles Auto Show. In 2013, for the 2014 model year, the car was renamed the QX60.

The QX60 was the first three-row crossover to be released by Infiniti. Design work was done through 2009, by Naoyuki Ohkoshi under Shiro Nakamura. In 2012 Nissan announced that the Pathfinder would also have the same platform as the QX60 for the 2013 model year.

The QX60 had previously been under consideration for the Australian market, but the numbers for right-hand-drive re-engineering and local homologation failed to add up and get approved by Australian authorities unlike its Nissan Pathfinder sibling. This meant that the QX60 would not be available in RHD markets, only in LHD markets.

=== Drivetrain and engine ===
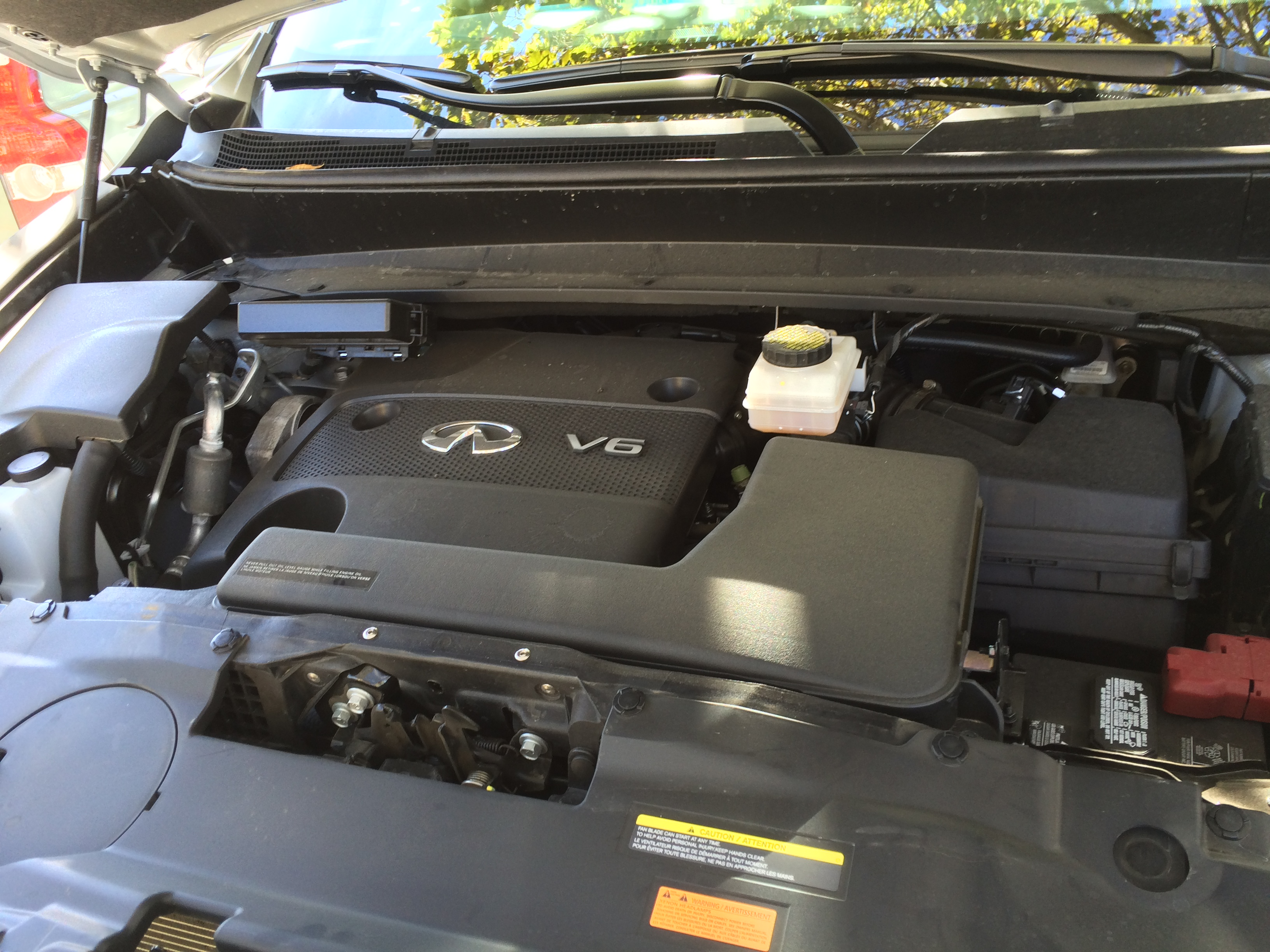
Infiniti QX60 3.5L VQ35DE V6

The QX60's original 3.5-liter VQ35DE V6 engine produces an output of 265 hp (198 kW) and 248 lb⋅ft (336 N⋅m). For 2017, this was updated with direct injection. The QX60 uses a continuously variable transmission.

In November 2013, for the 2014 model year, a hybrid version was introduced. The hybrid is powered by a supercharged 2.5-liter twin-cam 16-valve four cylinder engine with an electric motor and a compact 0.6 kWh lithium-ion battery pack located under the 3rd row seat. The new supercharged inline-four (QR25DER) is rated at 230 hp (170 kW) and 243 lb⋅ft (329 N⋅m), while the electric motor adds 15 kW (20 hp) and 29 lb⋅ft (39 N⋅m). Claimed total power is 250 hp (186 kW) and 243 lb⋅ft (329 N⋅m). The QX60 Hybrid was discontinued in the middle of 2017 after the 2017 model year, three years after the Nissan Pathfinder Hybrid was discontinued in late 2014 after the 2014 model year. The QX60 and QX60 Hybrid were the first vehicles in Infiniti's North American lineup to use Nissan's continuously variable transmission.

The 2017 QX60 was powered by a 3.5-liter, direct-injected V-6 that makes 295 hp (220 kW) and 270 lb⋅ft (366 N⋅m) of torque.

=== Performance and safety ===
- 0–60 mph (97 km/h): 8.3 seconds
- 3.5-liter 24-valve V6 engine, aluminum-alloy block and heads
- 12.6 x 1.10-inch ventilated discs/12.13 x 0.63-inch ventilated discs; 4-wheel, 4-channel ABS
- Automatic-on/off high intensity discharge bi-functional xenon headlights
- Integrated front fog lights
- LED rear brake lights and center high-mounted stop light
- LED daytime running lamps (2016 model year and up)

=== Safety ===
2016 Infiniti QX60 SUV AWD NHTSA
| Overall: | 5/5 stars |
| Frontal Driver: | 4/5 stars |
| Frontal Passenger: | 4/5 stars |
| Side Driver: | 5/5 stars |
| Side Passenger: | 5/5 stars |
| Side Pole Driver: | 5/5 stars |
| Rollover: | 17.9% |

IIHS:
| Category | Rating |
|---|---|
| Moderate overlap frontal offset | Good |
| Small overlap frontal offset (2015–present) | Good^{1} |
| Side impact | Good |
| Roof strength | Good^{2} |

^{1} vehicle structure rated "Good"
^{2} strength-to-weight ratio: 4.68

=== Model year changes and updates ===
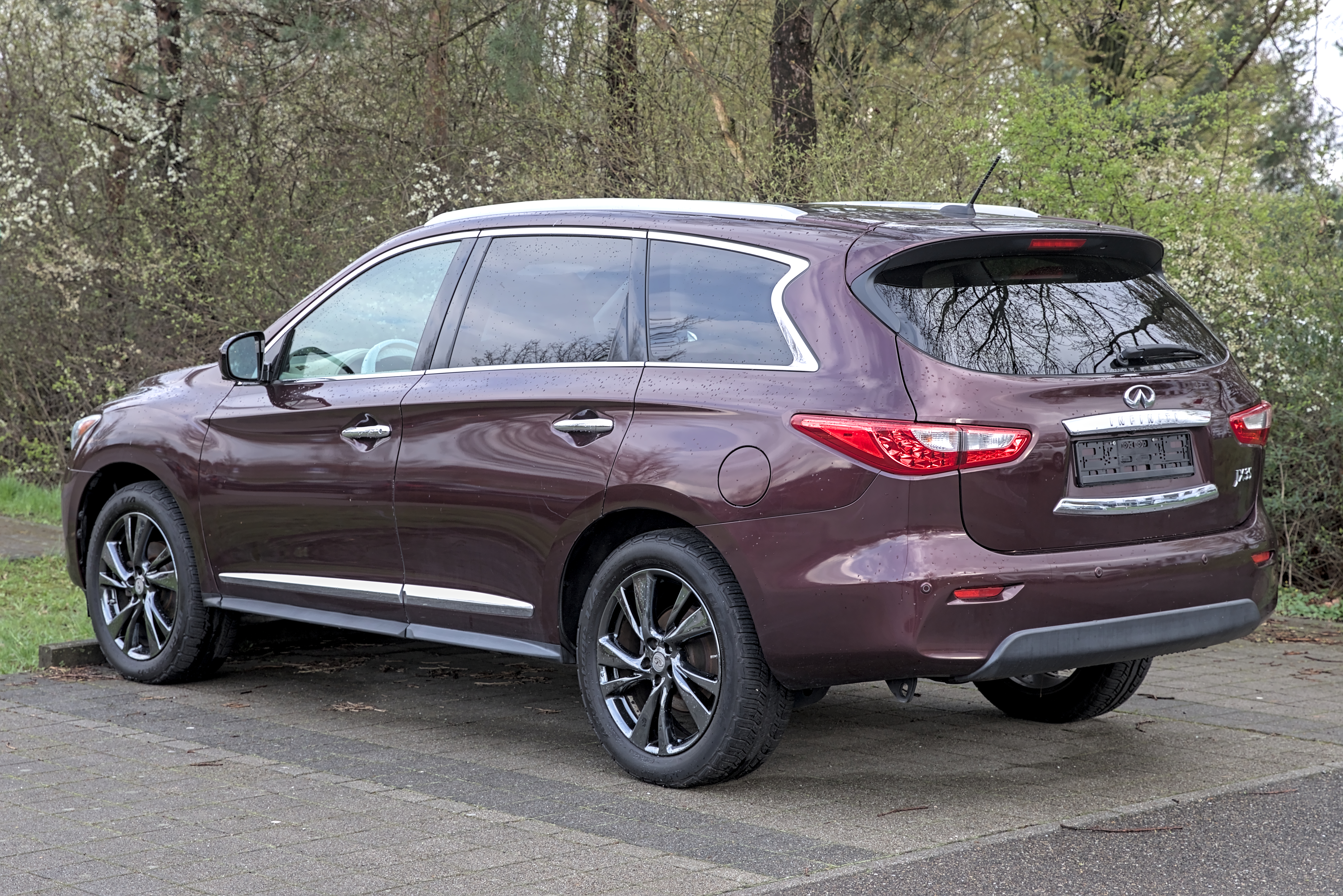
Infiniti JX35 rear

2013

First introduced as the JX35, the luxury cousin of the Nissan Pathfinder.

2014

For the 2014 model year, the JX35 was rebadged as the QX60. New features include a USB port added in the center console, a new 8-inch touch screen and navigation with AroundView Monitor, Forward Braking System, Forward Collision Warning and lane departure warning/prevention systems, rear view camera became standard, new Bose speakers and surround sound, and Hybrid variant added (limited and late availability for hybrid).

2015

For the 2015 model year, the QX60 received an updated CVT and became available with Backup Collision Intervention/blind spot warning/intervention systems.

2016 refresh

For the 2016 model year update, the QX60 received an exterior refresh which featured new front and rear fascias with restyled headlights and taillights (LED daytime running lights were added to the headlights on U.S. QX60 models, as were the restyled BI-XENON HID Projector headlamps and front turn signal lights), LED fog lights, rear turn signal lights, an interior update which adds 3 USB ports to all 2016 QX60 non-hybrid models versus the 1 USB port in the 2015 QX60, and updated Deluxe Touring Package. The Technology Package became standard on all 2016 QX60 models equipped with the Deluxe Touring Package and was renamed Deluxe Technology Package, which includes pre-crash front seatbelts, front and rear sonar system, Backup Collision Intervention, Forward Collision Warning, lane departure warning/prevention, roof rails with crossbars, High beam Assist (added mid year into the 2017 model year), Tri-Pane panoramic moonroof with sunshade, climate-controlled front seats switch, blind spot warning/intervention, Distance Control Assist, BOSE Surround Sound System with 15- speakers and 5.1 channel decoding, heated outboard second row seats, Advanced Climate-control System, 20x7.5 inch wheels, Active Trace Control, Eco Pedal, unique seat quilts (front and outboard second row seats), Forward Emergency Braking with Pedestrian Detection, Power Fold Third Row Seats (not available on Hybrid models), Motion Activated liftgate (available for the 2017 model year), and Maple interior accents. All 2016 QX60 models (and its cousin the 2017 Nissan Pathfinder) also have redesigned cup holders, new exterior colors and chassis enhancements.

The QX60 Hybrid models also received a new facelift with restyled headlights and taillights for 2016, just like the gasoline version, but with Premium Package, Navigation System, AroundView Monitor, HEV Gauge, Remote Engine Start, Driver's Memory Seat System, Pedestrian Detection, lithium-ion battery (located under the third-row seats), electric motor, HCVT with Manual Shift, 250 hp 2.5L I-4 supercharged hybrid engine with INFINITI HYBRID RESPONSE, Active Noise Control, rear lithium-ion battery air vents, regenerative braking, hybrid emblem, and roof rails without crossbars as additional standard features added to the QX60 Hybrid versus the gasoline QX60.

The facelifted QX60 began production in late 2015 and arrived to dealers in late February 2016.

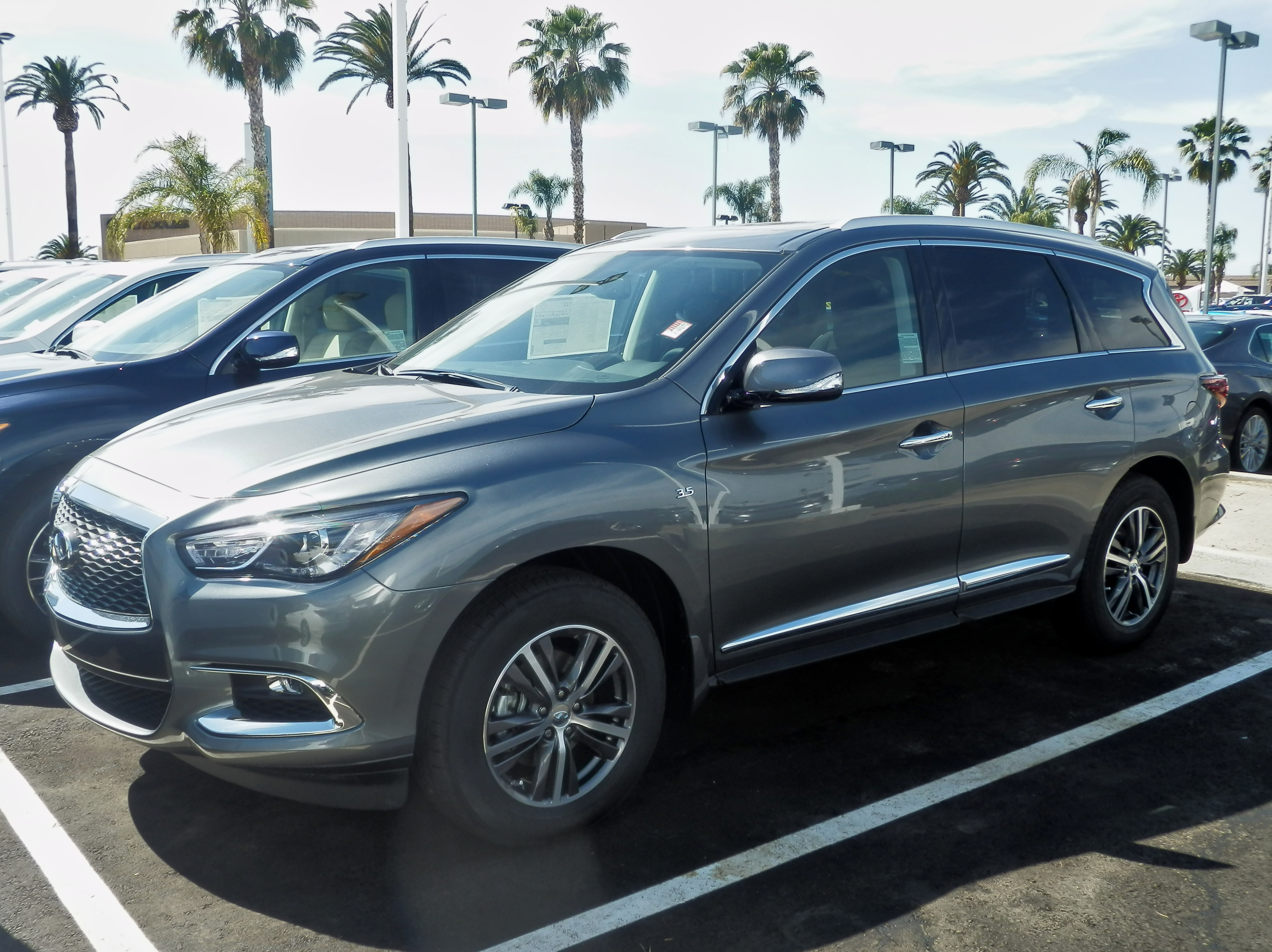
Infiniti QX60 facelift

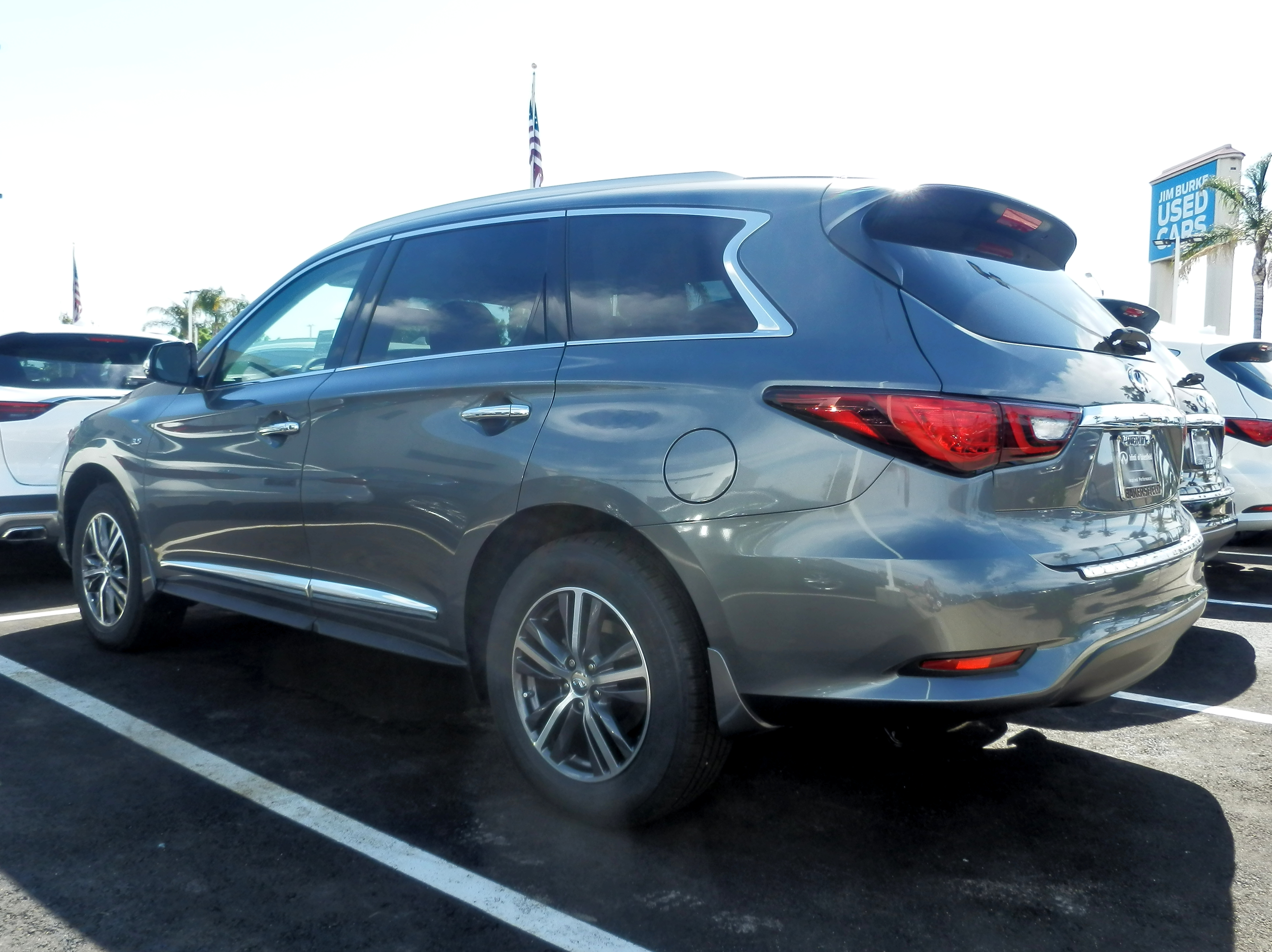
Infiniti QX60 facelift

2017

For 2017, the QX60 increased in power to 295 hp (220 kW). Models featured a WI-FI option as part of models with the rear seat entertainment system only and the QX60 Hybrid variant will be available later than the regular variant unlike for the 2016 model year. The models with rear seat entertainment system also received bigger DVD headrest screens unlike in previous model years. Models with the Deluxe Technology Package also received high beam assist and a Motion Activated Liftgate as part of the package which changes the rear bumper by adding a motion sensor for the liftgate. The 2017 Infiniti QX60 also received a new direct-injected V6 engine with CVT just like the facelifted 2017 Nissan Pathfinder.

2018

The QX60 didn’t have major updates for 2018. The only changes are that the QX60 will have Automatic Emergency Braking and Rear Door Alert systems added. The hybrid variant of the QX60 was discontinued for the 2018 model year due to poor sales but Infiniti plans to launch a hybrid and/or an all-electric version of the QX60 starting with the second generation in the future as part of Nissan's vehicle electrification plans.

2019

A new Limited Edition trim level was added to the 2019 QX60 trim level family along with a new exterior paint color option. The 2019.5 mid model year update includes LED headlamps standard on all trims.

2020

The 2020 model is available in four trim levels, Pure, Pure AWD, Luxe, and Luxe AWD. The Pure models are the least expensive trim levels, having fewer options compared to Luxe, and are not available with any packages. The Edition 30 package is introduced as an available option on the Luxe and Luxe AWD trim levels with the Essential Package but it is not available on vehicles with the Sensory, Proactive, and Theater/Rear Seat Entertainment System Packages or on vehicles that are not equipped with the Essential Package.

=== Safety recalls ===
On October 9, 2013, Nissan Pathfinder units and Infiniti JX35/QX60 units manufactured between September 15, 2011, and September 20, 2013, were recalled due to the risk of output software on the antilock brake system causing vehicle damage and a crash.

On February 13, 2017, Infiniti QX60 hybrid units sold in China that were manufactured between January 19, 2016 and February 5, 2016 were recalled due to certain parts of fuel tanks being thinner than standard, leading to possible fuel leakage under heavy collision and possibly causing a vehicle fire. This affected 205 vehicles that were built in 2016.

In November 2019, Nissan recalled 400,000 Nissan and Infiniti vehicles including certain 2017-2019 model year Infiniti QX60s and Nissan Pathfinders, 2015-2018 model year Nissan Muranos, and 2016-2018 model year Nissan Maximas due a faulty pump seal that will wear down prematurely and cause the brake fluid to leak leading to a vehicle fire if owners ignore the ABS warning light when it turns on. The recall also includes vehicles that were part of a previous similar recall that haven't been repaired. This recall comes after a woman's 2016 Nissan Murano parked on a street near community mailboxes in Texas ignited on fire several minutes after the ABS warning light came on and didn't realize initially that her Murano was included in the recall until she started smelling burnt melted plastic with the warning coming on. Another Nissan vehicle fire occurred as well when another 2016 Nissan Murano at a car dealership in Georgia ignited on fire. A third accident also occurred when a 2017 Nissan Maxima ignited on fire and exploded less than a month after it was manufactured and purchased due to brake fluid leaking onto the circuit board. Nissan currently doesn't have any fix for this recall and stated that all owners of the affected vehicles are to park their vehicles immediately in open spaces away from garages, buildings, and other vehicles as soon as the ABS warning light turns on. Nissan says that is working on a remedy and once the remedy becomes available, Nissan will eventually send a final notification letter to owners of the affected vehicles asking them to bring the vehicles to authorized Nissan and Infiniti dealers immediately to have the vehicles inspected and remedy work completed at no cost for parts and labor.

== Second generation (L51; 2022) ==
Second generation
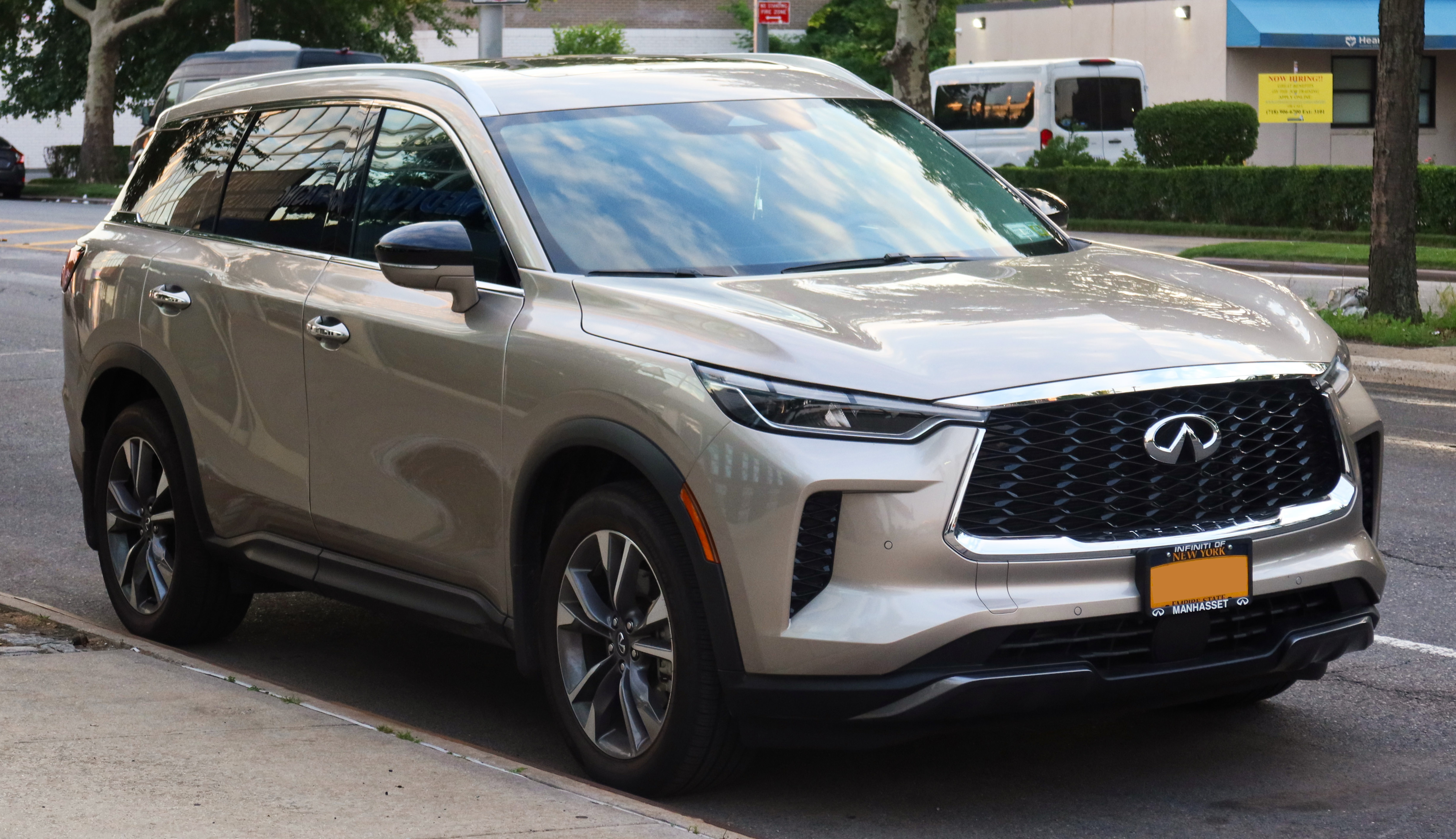
- 2022 Infiniti QX60 (L51)

Overview
- Model code: L51
- Production: October 2021–present
- Model years: 2022–present
- Assembly: United States: Smyrna, Tennessee (Nissan Smyrna Assembly Plant); China: Xiangyang, Hubei (DMCL)

Body and chassis
- Platform: Nissan D platform
- Related: Nissan Pathfinder (R53); Infiniti QX65

Powertrain
- Engine: Gasoline: 2.0 L KR20DDET turbo I4; 3.5 L VQ35DD V6
- Transmission: 9-speed ZF 9HP automatic

Dimensions
- Wheelbase: 2,900 mm (114.2 in)
- Length: 5,047 mm (198.7 in)
- Width: 1,981 mm (78.0 in)
- Height: 1,770 mm (69.7 in)

The second-generation QX60 was unveiled on June 23, 2021. The vehicle was previously previewed by the QX60 Monograph concept, and has been developed alongside the R53 Nissan Pathfinder that debuted in early February 2021 also as a 2022 model. It also uses a version of the architecture used by the previous generation, updated with additional high-strength steel and other materials for more stiffness.

The vehicle uses the same powertrain as the previous generation and the Pathfinder, which is the VQ35DD 3.5-liter V6 gasoline engine mated to a 9-speed automatic from ZF, replacing the continuously variable transmission. Tuned slightly higher for the Infiniti, the engine makes 295 hp (299 PS; 220 kW) and 270 lb⋅ft (366 N⋅m; 37.3 kg⋅m). Front-wheel drive is standard and an updated all-wheel-drive system with a direct coupling is optional. Some grades will have the capability to tow up to 6,000 lb (2,722 kg), 20 percent more than the outgoing model due to an uprated transmission oil cooler, an integrated hitch receiver, trailer-tuned stability programming, and dedicated pre-wiring harnesses. The Chinese version of the 2nd-generation Infiniti QX60 will be powered by a turbocharged 2.0L four cylinder KR20DDET engine instead of the VQ35DD 3.5-liter V6 gasoline engine as the 3.5-liter V6 engine is unable to comply with China's automotive emissions standards and due to China's excise tax on internal-combustion engines that exceed 3.0 liters.

The L51 QX60 is a seven-seater vehicle, with a two-position rear bench that preserves room in the middle for a storage box, or an optional pair of captain's chairs.

In July 2024, Nissan announced that the current sole VQ35DD 3.5-liter V6 gasoline engine that powers the global-market Infiniti QX60 will be discontinued and replaced by the same turbocharged 2.0L inline-four cylinder gasoline engine that already powers the Chinese-market versions of Infiniti QX60 and Nissan Pathfinder for the 2025 model year due to stringent automotive emissions and fuel economy standards required for future model years and due to Nissan's push to transition its vehicle lineups to 100% all-electric vehicles by the 2030s.

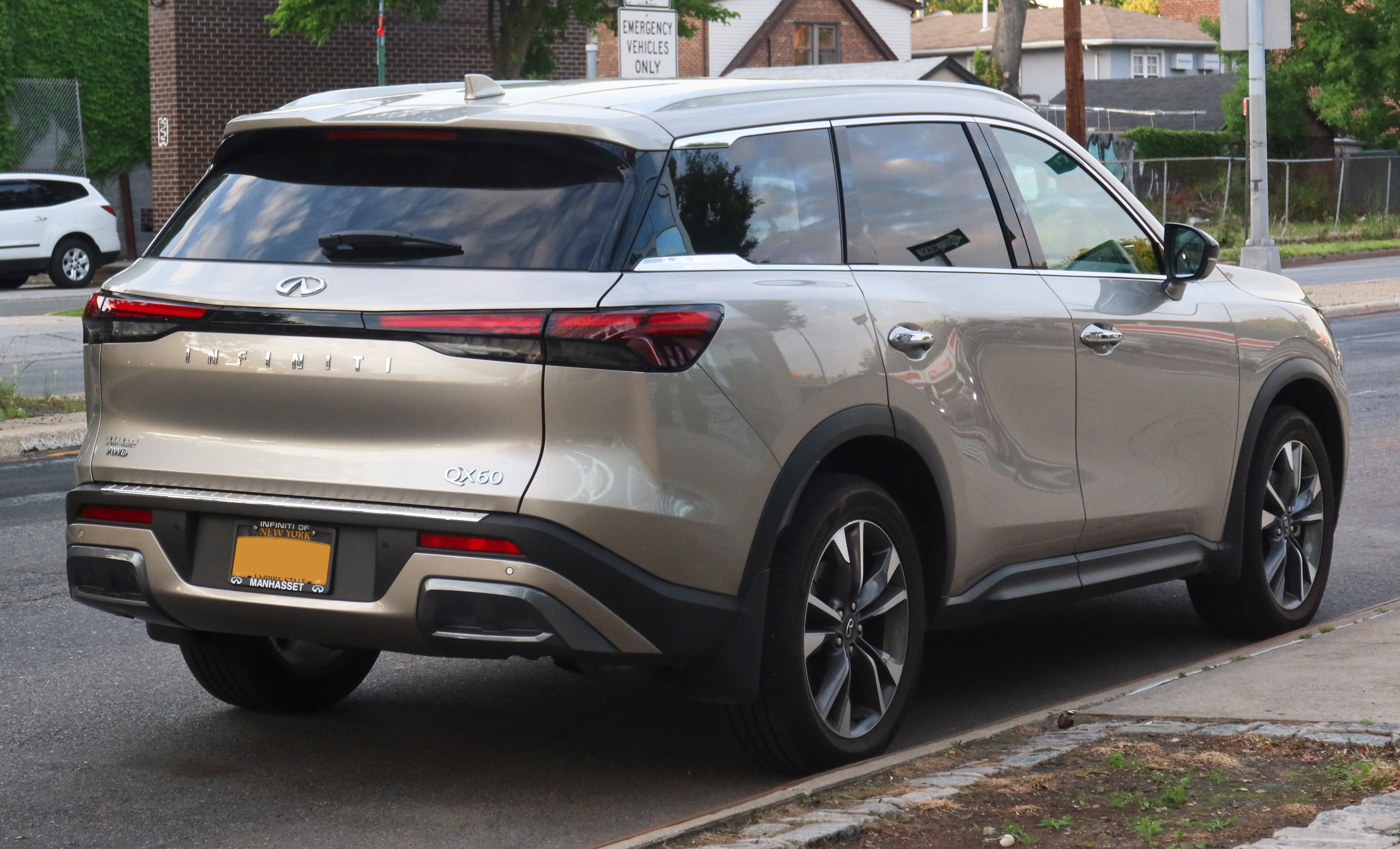
Rear view

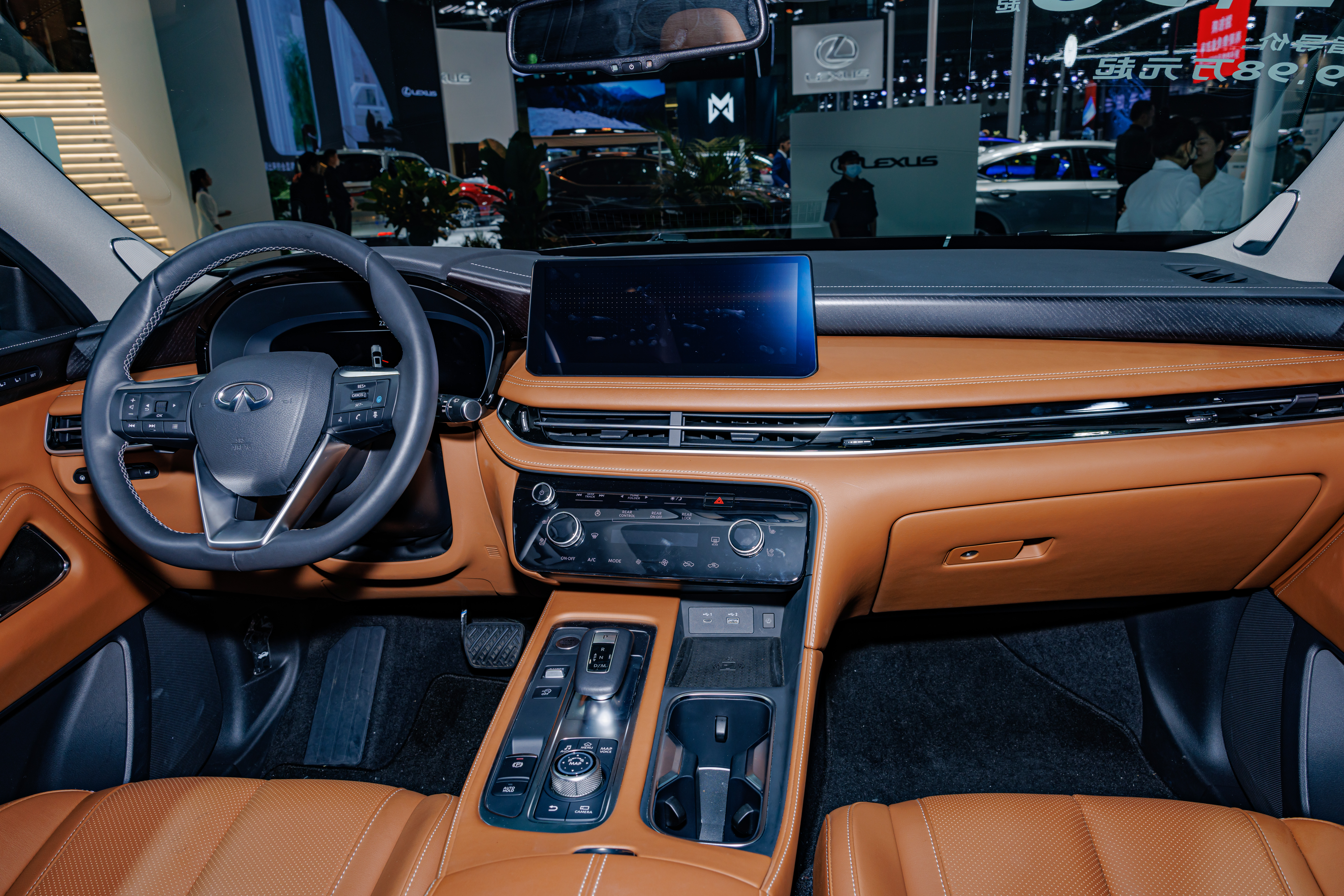
Interior

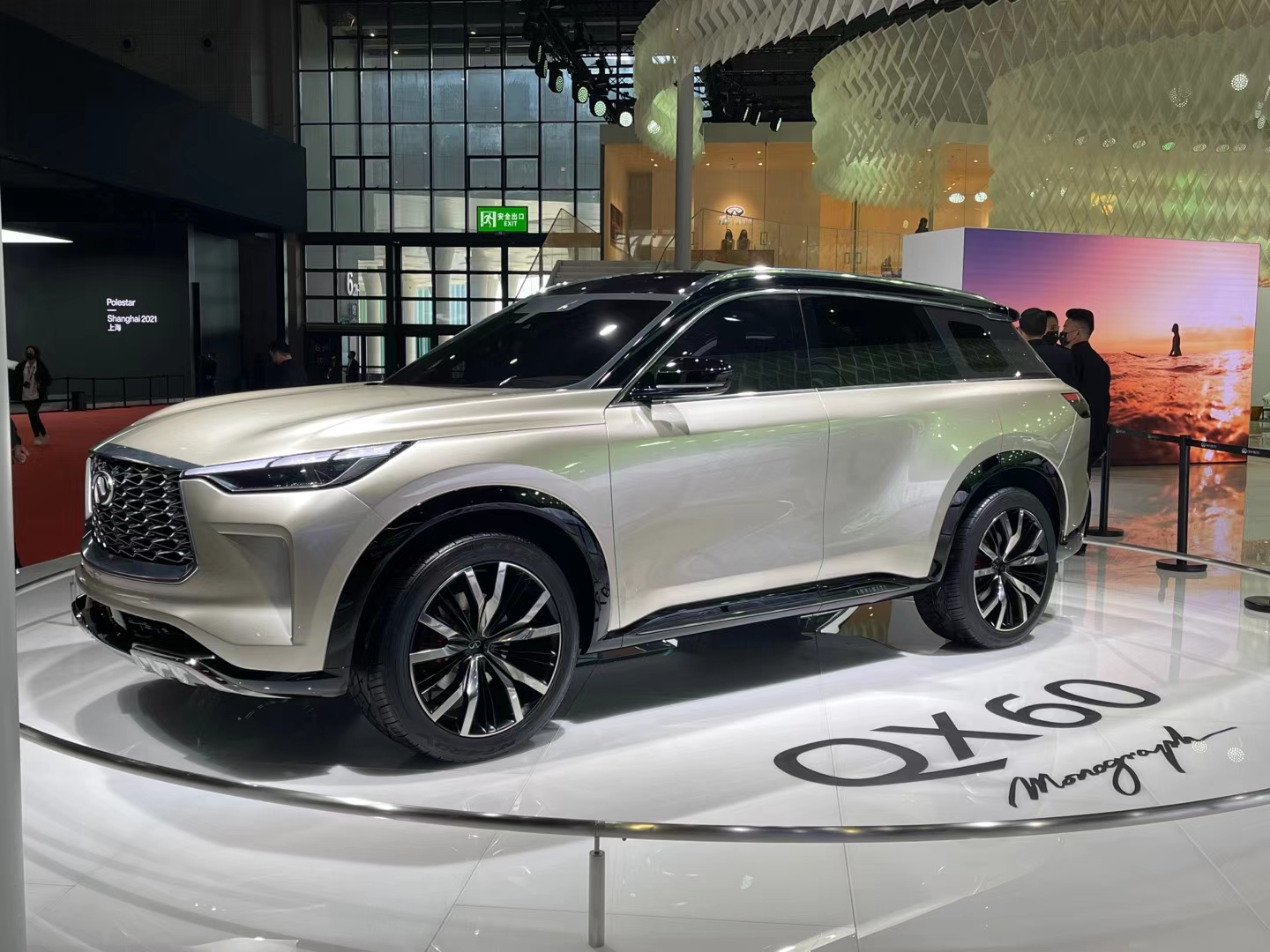
QX60 Monograph Concept

=== Facelift ===
The facelift for the QX60 was unveiled on May 19, 2025, it is scheduled to go on sale in middle of 2025 for the 2026 model year. The changes includes a redesigned front fascia incorporates Artistry in Motion design philosophy, a new 3D Infiniti logo on the grille with the illumination feature, minor changes to the side and rear, new Light Path feature with welcoming light signatures upon unlocking the vehicle, new exterior colors and new alloy wheel designs. Inside, a 12.3-inch digital instrument cluster became standard on all trims, the infotainment system features Google built-in, a new Klipsch audio system, and new trim and upholstery options. For safety, the facelifted QX60 became available with the 3D Around View Monitor system and the ProPILOT Assist 2.1 advanced driving assistance system with hands-free driving capability. The Sport model was introduced for the facelift model with styling changes such as a unique front fascia design with a new lower front bumper protector, gloss black 20-inch alloy wheels, dark exterior accents and a Dusk Blue upholstery with combination black-and-blue interior color theme.

=== Safety ===
The 2023 model year QX60 was awarded "Top Safety Pick+" by IIHS.

IIHS scores (2023 model year)
| Small overlap front (driver) | Good |
| Small overlap front (passenger) | Good |
| Moderate overlap front (original test) | Good |
| Side (original test) | Good |
| Side (updated test) | Good |
| Roof strength | Good |
| Head restraints and seats | Good |
| Headlights | Good |
| Front crash prevention: vehicle-to-vehicle | Superior |
| Front crash prevention: vehicle-to-vehicle (Day) | Superior |
| Front crash prevention: vehicle-to-vehicle (Night) | Superior |
| Seatbelt reminders | Acceptable |
| Child seat anchors (LATCH) ease of use | Good+ |

== Sales ==
| Calendar year | US | Canada | China |
|---|---|---|---|
| 2021 | 5,829 | 1,040 | |
| 2022 | 16,573 | 2,217 | |
| 2023 | 29,383 | 3,245 | 1,477 |
| 2024 | 27,808 | 3,342 | 1,843 |
| 2025 | 30,538 | 1,726 | 1,030 |
