= Mitsubishi Spyder =

Mitsubishi Spyder may refer to any of several vehicles by Mitsubishi Motors:

- Mitsubishi Eclipse Spyder, any of several convertible cars produced between 1996 and 2011
- Mitsubishi 3000GT Spyder, a convertible version of the Mitsubishi 3000GT, produced in limited quantities in 1995 and 1996
- Mitsubishi Tarmac Spyder, a 2003 convertible concept car based on the Mitsubishi Colt
