= Sauber (disambiguation) =

Sauber is a Swiss Formula One team. It may also refer to:

- Marcel Sauber (born 1939), Luxembourgish politician
- Peter Sauber (born 1943), Swiss racing driver and Formula One team principal and owner
- Richard Sauber, American attorney, special counsel for President Joe Biden
- Sandy Sauber (born 1997), Luxembourgish former footballer
- BMW Sauber, German Formula One team that competed from 2006 to 2009
- Sauber, a short-lived Austrian car brand that sold grey-import American vehicles in Austria in the early 1990s.
