= Akinori Nakanishi =

Akinori Nakanishi (仲西 昭徳) (born 1954 in Japan) is the chief designer for Mitsubishi Motors, based at the company's design and research centre in Okazaki, Aichi. He was appointed to this position in June 2004, having previously worked as the General Manager for Mitsubishi Design Europe in Trebur, Germany.

He began working for Mitsubishi in 1977 as soon as he graduated, and was responsible for both the 1991 and 2003 Colts, the HSR concept cars and the Mitsubishi Triton, among others. He cites fashion designers Issey Miyake and Giorgio Armani and movies such as The Matrix and The Lord of the Rings as inspirations, and names the original Mini and the Jaguar E-type as his personal favourite automotive designs.

For his company's future, he has envisaged a sporty, wide-track look, saying "We are not a giant company, so we should be unique. This [look] gives them a wider stance. The bean counters don't like that. It is too expensive."
