= Ohio Assembly =

Ford Motor Company assembly plant

Coordinates: 41°29′27.11″N 82°3′54.98″W

Ohio Assembly Plant
- Operated: 1974–present
- Location: 650 Miller Road; Avon Lake, Ohio, United States
- Industry: Automotive
- Products: commercial vehicles
- Employees: 1,700 (2024)
- Area: 419 acres (1.70 km^{2})
- Volume: 3,700,000 square feet (340,000 m^{2})
- Owner: Ford Motor Company

Ohio Assembly Plant (OHAP) is a Ford Motor Company factory located in Avon Lake, Ohio. The 3,700,000 sq ft (340,000 m^{2}) plant sits on 419 acres and originally produced the Ford Econoline/E-Series van.

As of 2024, the plant has over 1,700 employees, and is represented by the UAW Local 2000.

== History ==
=== 1974–2014 ===
The plant was opened in 1974 to produce the Ford Econoline/E-Series van.

On April 14, 1992, the plant began producing the Mercury Villager and Nissan Quest minivans for the 1993 model year. The $1.037 billion investment (across its Ohio Operations) added nearly 1,600 jobs to the facility.

On January 11, 2002, Ford Motor Company announced it would lay off 970 workers at the Ohio Assembly Plant as part of a massive global restructuring plan that cut 35,000 jobs worldwide and 22,000 in North America. Due to cutbacks, Ford ended production of the Mercury Villager and Nissan Quest minivans at the plant on June 28th of that year. Also in the same year, the company announced it will build the Ford Escape SUV at the plant by 2003. In August 2004, the plant also began production of the Mercury Mariner SUV, which is based on a same platform with the Ford Escape.

In August 2005, Ford transferred production of its Ford Escape and Mercury Mariner SUVs from the Ohio Assembly Plant to the Kansas City Assembly Plant in Kansas City, Missouri, to make room for more E-Series production. The company also consolidated its E-Series production at the plant after the Lorain Assembly Plant shut down on December 23rd of that year.

=== 2014–present ===
In 2014, the plant stopped producing the Ford E-Series van in passenger and cargo variants, which was replaced by the Ford Transit van (built in Kansas City, Missouri) for the 2015 model year, although cutaway van and stripped chassis variants will continue to be built at the plant for heavy duty applications. In August 2015, production of the medium-duty Ford F-650 and F-750 (previously made in Mexico) began at the plant.

In the summer of 2016, production of the 2017 F-350, F-450 and F-550 chassis cab began at the plant to supplement capacity for the Kentucky Truck Plant in Louisville, Kentucky. In 2017, Ohio Assembly received the coveted Q1 Quality Award for highest build quality off the assembly line.

In 2022, Ford announced a $1.5 billion investment to expand the Ohio Assembly plant by adding 1,800 new union manufacturing workers, roughly doubling the plant's existing workforce of about 1,740 workers. Originally scheduled to produce an all-new electric commercial van, the plant will begin production of the gasoline and hybrid commercial van in 2029.

On August 13, 2026, two UAW unions filed charges against Ford, alleging the company is violating its contract regarding grievance procedures.

== Products made ==
=== Current ===
- Ford E-Series (Econoline) Cutaway/Strip Chassis (1974–present)
- Ford F-650/F-750 (2016–present)
- Ford Super Duty chassis cab (2017–present)

=== Former ===
- Ford Econoline/E-Series van (1974–2014)
- Mercury Villager (1993–2002)
- Nissan Quest (1993–2002)
- Ford Escape (2004–2005)
- Mercury Mariner (2005–2006)

== See also ==
- Lorain Assembly
