= Mitsubishi HSR =

Overview
- Manufacturer: Mitsubishi Motors
- Production: 1987–1997
- Designer: Akinori Nakanishi

Body and chassis
- Class: Concept car
- Body style: 2-door coupe 2-door roadster
- Layout: M4 layout

Powertrain
- Transmission: 6-speed manual

The Mitsubishi HSR (Highly Sophisticated-transport Research) is a range of concept cars exhibited by Mitsubishi Motors through the late 1980s and 1990s. There were six distinct iterations of the vehicle released biannually to coincide with the Tokyo Motor Show, with each model after the original identified by a Roman numeral suffixed to the name. The meaning of the acronym varied over the years. The first iteration meant Hi-speed Running Research, the second Hi-Sophisticated Research, and the third Human Science Research.

== Models ==
- HSR (1987) — The first vehicle was a showcase for Mitsubishi's integrated electronic systems offering automatic control of drive train, suspension, steering, brakes, and driving position according to driving conditions or weather. It was powered by a 2.0-litre 16-valve turbocharged engine producing 295 PS (217 kW), had a maximum speed claimed by the factory at 300 km/h (186 mph).
- HSR-II (1989) — The second generation had a heavy emphasis on active aerodynamics, with a series of movable fins and spoilers offering a drag factor which varied from 0.20 to 0.40 depending on setup. Much of the technology found its way to the Mitsubishi HSX, the precursor to the company's GTO sports car. It is also featured in the games Gran Turismo 4, Gran Turismo 5 and Gran Turismo 6.
- HSR-III (1991) — The third concept car to bear the HSR name was powered by the 180 PS (132 kW) 6A10 1.6-litre V6, the world's smallest mass-produced V6. Its design themes were "Human Scale Technology" and "Small is beautiful." It continued the active aerodynamics theme of the HSR-II, but with the addition of flexible skin on the rear spoiler, dubbed an "elastic aerotail." Shifting from the overtly sporting and powerful earlier HSRs, the HSR-III also focused on cleanliness and recyclability - with the body parts all marked for ease of recycling.
- HSR-IV (1993) — A 180 PS (132 kW) modulated displacement version of the 1.6-litre V6 powered the fourth prototype, a four-wheel-drive sports car featuring an all-wheel anti-lock braking system.
- HSR-V (1995) — The fifth generation, a targa topped sports car with a folding hardtop roof, featured the debut of Mitsubishi's gasoline direct injection (GDI) technology in its ICDIGE engine.
- HSR-VI (1997) — Fitted with a 2.4-litre version of the GDI engine, the sixth and final HSR concept featured four-wheel steering, active yaw control, traction control and an automated driving system.

== Specifications ==
Generation	Engine	Displacement	Horsepower	Torque	Weight
HSR I	4G63T I4	1,997 cc (121.9 cu in; 1.997 L)	295 PS (291 bhp; 217 kW)	450 N⋅m (330 lb⋅ft)	1,200 kg (2,600 lb)
HSR II	6G72 V6	2,972 cc (181.4 cu in; 2.972 L)	350 PS (350 bhp; 260 kW)	464 N⋅m (342 lb⋅ft)	1,200 kg (2,600 lb)
HSR III	6A10 V6	1,597 cc (97.5 cu in; 1.597 L)	180 PS (180 bhp; 130 kW)	199 N⋅m (147 lb⋅ft)	1,220 kg (2,690 lb)
HSR IV	6A10 V6	1,597 cc (97.5 cu in; 1.597 L)	180 PS (180 bhp; 130 kW)	199 N⋅m (147 lb⋅ft)	1,300 kg (2,900 lb)
HSR V	4G64 I4	1,834 cc (111.9 cu in; 1.834 L)	300 PS (300 bhp; 220 kW)	386 N⋅m (285 lb⋅ft)	1,200 kg (2,600 lb)
HSR VI	4G64 I4	2,351 cc (143.5 cu in; 2.351 L)	150 PS (150 bhp; 110 kW)	224 N⋅m (165 lb⋅ft)	1,120 kg (2,470 lb)
