= Mercury Villager =

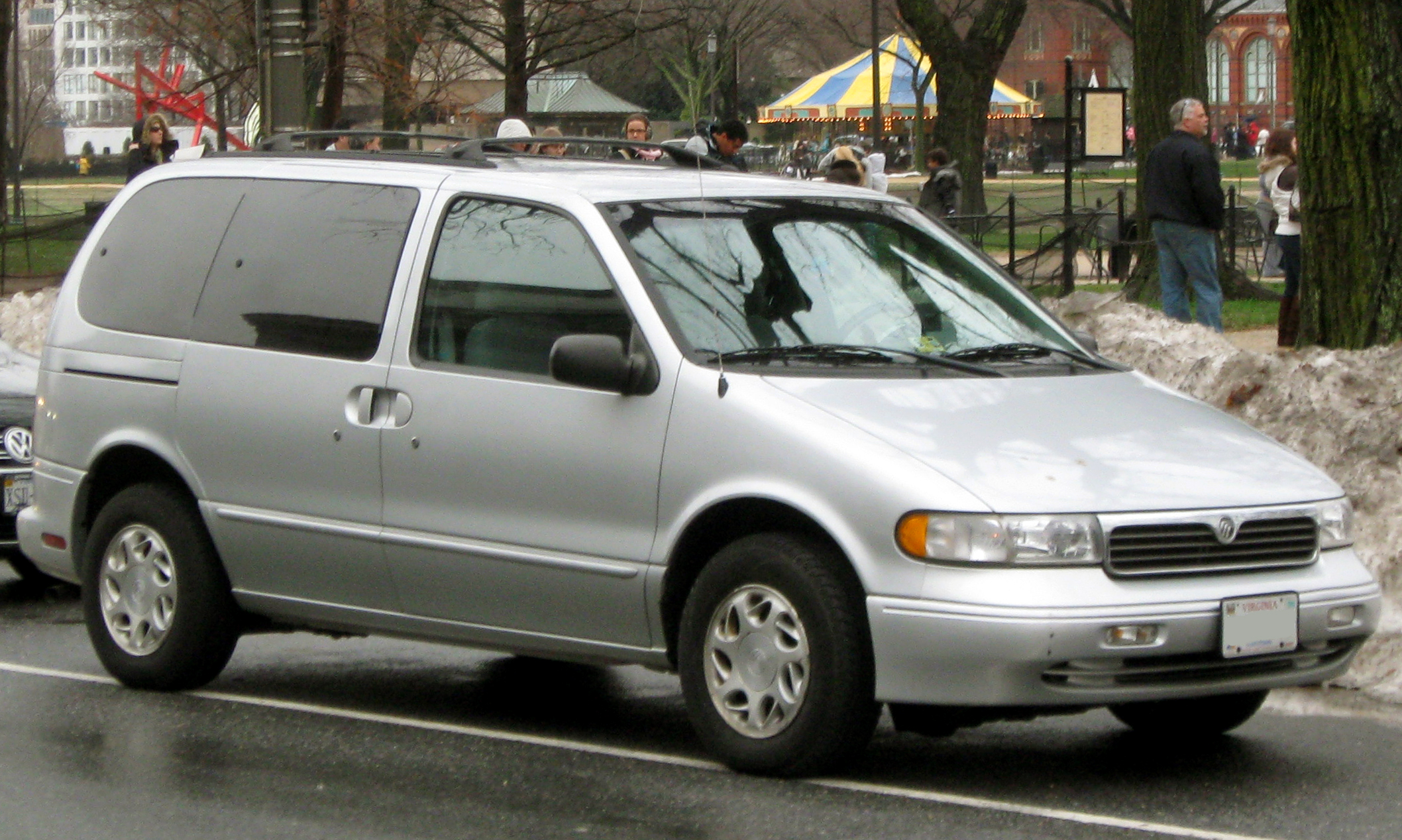

Overview
- Manufacturer: Mercury (Ford); Nissan
- Also called: Nissan Quest; Sauber Villager (Austria)
- Production: 1992–2002
- Assembly: United States: Avon Lake, Ohio (Ohio Assembly)

Body and chassis
- Class: Minivan
- Layout: FF layout
- Platform: Ford VX54 platform
- Related: Nissan Maxima (J30)

Chronology
- Successor: Mercury Monterey

The Mercury Villager is a minivan that was marketed by Mercury from 1993 to 2002. Taking its name used by Mercury to denote its wood-trimmed station wagons, the Villager was developed in a joint venture between Ford and Nissan; the latter manufacturer marketed the line as the Nissan Quest. The first front-wheel drive van produced by Ford, the Mercury Villager was introduced between the Ford Aerostar and the Ford Windstar, competing against Chrysler minivans and the General Motors APV minivans.

Two generations of the model line were produced, with the Villager undergoing a full redesign for 1999. In a first for the minivan segment, the model line replaced a removable rear seat with a design that was repositionable (dependent on passenger or cargo use). The Villager was the last Mercury developed with the lightbar grille used by the brand.

The Villager was produced alongside the Nissan Quest by Ford at its Ohio Assembly facility (Avon Lake, Ohio) alongside the Ford Econoline/Club Wagon. After 2002, the Ford-Nissan joint venture ended, with both companies developing minivans on their own. Nissan released a new generation of the Quest, while the Villager was replaced entirely; for 2004, Mercury released a revived Monterey as its second minivan (a divisional counterpart of the Ford Freestar).

== Background ==
=== Nameplate ===
Within Ford Motor Company, the Villager nameplate saw its first use for 1958, as the Edsel Villager debuted as the mid-range station wagon for its namesake brand. The only station wagon produced for all three model years of the Edsel brand, the Villager was offered with four doors and without exterior wood trim.

Following the demise of Edsel, the nameplate was adopted by Mercury, debuting it for 1962 for its compact Comet series. In what became a tradition for the brand, the Comet Villager was offered with simulated woodgrain trim. From 1962 to 1984, Mercury "Villager" station wagons were the counterpart of the Ford "Squire" trim, denoting wood-trim station wagons (excluding the full-size Mercury Colony Park). Following the 1962–1967 Comet Villager, Mercury used the Villager name for five further models, including the Montego (1970–1976), Bobcat (1975–1980), Cougar (1977 and 1982), Zephyr (1978–1981) and Lynx (1981–1984).

Following the introduction of the 1983 Marquis, Mercury replaced the Villager name for wood-trim station wagons with Brougham (the Mercury Sable that replaced it was never offered with the option).

=== Development ===
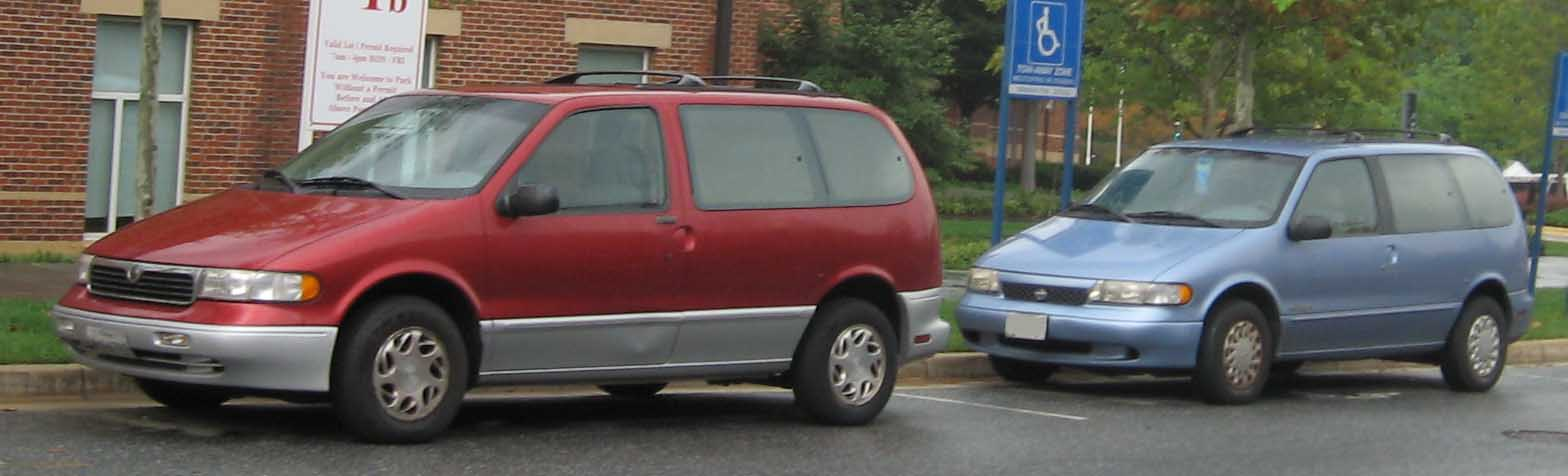
Mercury Villager (red) and Nissan Quest (blue)

At the beginning of 1988, Ford and Nissan entered a joint venture to develop an all-new minivan sold by both automakers. Under the terms of the agreement, the development and engineering of the vehicles was done by Nissan (in the United States); the company also supplied the engine and transmission. Ford would manufacture the vehicles in its own facility, providing components for the vehicle.

Development officially commenced later that year, codenamed VX54. The program would replace two existing Nissan product lines developed in Japan (the Van and the Axxess) and Ford would market its version as a Mercury (the VX54 program coincided with the simultaneous development of the WIN88 program, later the Ford Windstar). The final designs were chosen by Nissan in 1989, with both companies commencing testing of prototypes in 1990; real-world testing was done through 1991, as development concluded at the end of that year.

During the 1980s, family-use vehicles transitioned from full-size station wagons towards minivans. In place of the full-size Mercury Colony Park, during the development process, designers benchmarked the mid-size as its goal for features, ride, and handling. Along with deriving the front lightbar grille from the Sable, the Villager adopted its two-way liftgate (hatchback rear window) from the station wagon.

While all-wheel drive was initially planned in the VX54 program, slow sales of Chrysler AWD minivans led to Ford dropping it from development of the Villager.

== First generation (1993–1998) ==
First generation
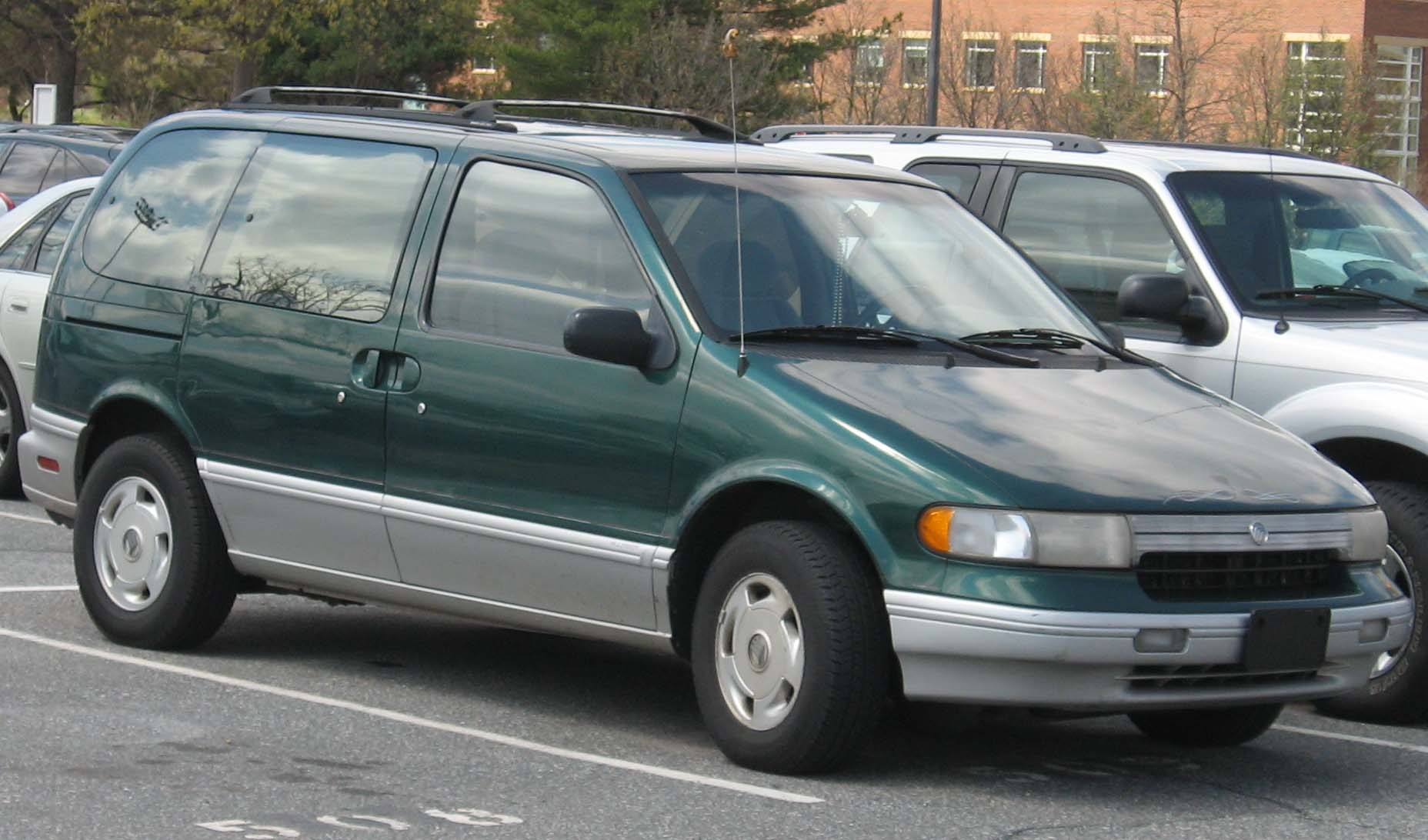

Overview
- Also called: Nissan Quest; Yunbao YB6480 (China); Fengshen EQ6482 (China); Guangdong Bus Works GDK6480 (China); Sauber Villager (Austria)
- Production: 1992–1998; 1995–2001 (China)
- Model years: 1993–1998
- Assembly: United States: Avon Lake, Ohio (Ohio Assembly)

Body and chassis
- Body style: 3-door minivan

Powertrain
- Engine: 3.0 L VG30E V6

Dimensions
- Wheelbase: 112.2 in (2,850 mm)
- Length: 189.9 in (4,823 mm) (1993–95); 190.2 in (4,831 mm) (1995–98)
- Width: 73.7 in (1,872 mm) (1993–95); 73.8 in (1,875 mm) (1995–98)
- Height: 67.6 in (1,717 mm) (1993–95); 67.5 in (1,714 mm) (1995–98 GS Cargo); 65.9 in (1,674 mm) (1995–98 GS); 65.6 in (1,666 mm) (1995–98 Nautica & LS)
- Curb weight: 3,815 lb (1,730 kg)

Launched alongside the Nissan Quest in July 1992 as a 1993 model, the Mercury Villager was introduced at the 1992 Chicago Auto Show. Having forgone the minivan segment since the 1986 introduction of the Ford Aerostar, the 1993 Mercury Villager was the first Mercury since 1960 produced without a Ford (or Lincoln) counterpart. In 1993 and 1994, an independent Austrian importer called Sauber (no relation to the F1 team) brought in a small number of Villagers and sold them under their own name.

=== Chassis specification ===
The first-generation Villager uses the front-wheel drive Ford VX54 platform. While using a Ford codename, the platform is an evolution of the 1989-1994 Nissan Maxima (J30 chassis). Using a 112.2-inch wheelbase, the chassis shares nearly an identical wheelbase with a standard-wheelbase 1984-1995 Chrysler minivan (an inch longer than a short-wheelbase Chevrolet Astro).

The Villager uses MacPherson struts for the front suspension and leaf springs for the solid rear axle. The front brakes were vented discs with rear drums (Rear disc brakes were included on models equipped with the trailer towing package); anti-lock brakes were fitted as standard equipment.

==== Powertrain ====
The first-generation Villager (and its Quest counterpart) was powered by a single engine through its production. Sharing its engine with the Nissan Maxima, the Villager was powered by a 3.0-liter Nissan VG30E V6 (detuned from 160 to 151 horsepower). A Jatco-supplied 4-speed automatic was the sole transmission offering.

In the development of the VX54 model line, Ford requested several design changes from Nissan before it would use the engine. Along with making the VG30E a non-interference engine, Ford requested the addition of an oil level sensor and the relocation of the oil filter assembly (for better access).

=== Body design ===
At 190 inches long, the first-generation Villager nearly matches the extended-length 1991–1995 Chrysler minivans in length. In contrast to the Aerostar, the Villager was produced solely as a passenger van and in a single body length. All versions were produced with single sliding door.

In line with the Mercury Sable and Mercury Topaz sedans, the Villager was distinguished from its Nissan Quest counterpart by its front lightbar grille. While the Quest was styled with a monochromatic exterior (for all trims), the Villager used multiple two-toned exterior trims (base trims used wide gray moldings, in line with the 1992 Grand Marquis). To aid aerodynamics, the exterior door handles were faired into the doors. In a minivan first, the rear liftgate was modeled after compact station wagons; the rear window opened independently from the door.

For 1996, the exterior underwent a mid-cycle revision. A conventional grille (modeled after the Sable and Mystique) replaced the lightbar, with restyled taillamps (joined by a red panel), badging, and the introduction of monochromatic exterior trim (for lower trims).

While the exterior and interior of the vehicle was designed primarily by Nissan, many interior components were sourced from Ford. In line with the Aerostar, the Villager was equipped with optional rear-seat radio controls and air-conditioning vents. Along with folding/removable second-row seats (bench or bucket, dependent on trim), the third-row bench seat was mounted on sliding tracks, allowing the interior to be reconfigured (for passengers or cargo) without its removal. To meet passive-restraint requirements, the Villager was initially equipped with automatic seatbelts (the only American-market minivan to do so); for 1994, a driver-side airbag was added, with dual airbags becoming standard for 1996 (replacing the automatic seatbelts).

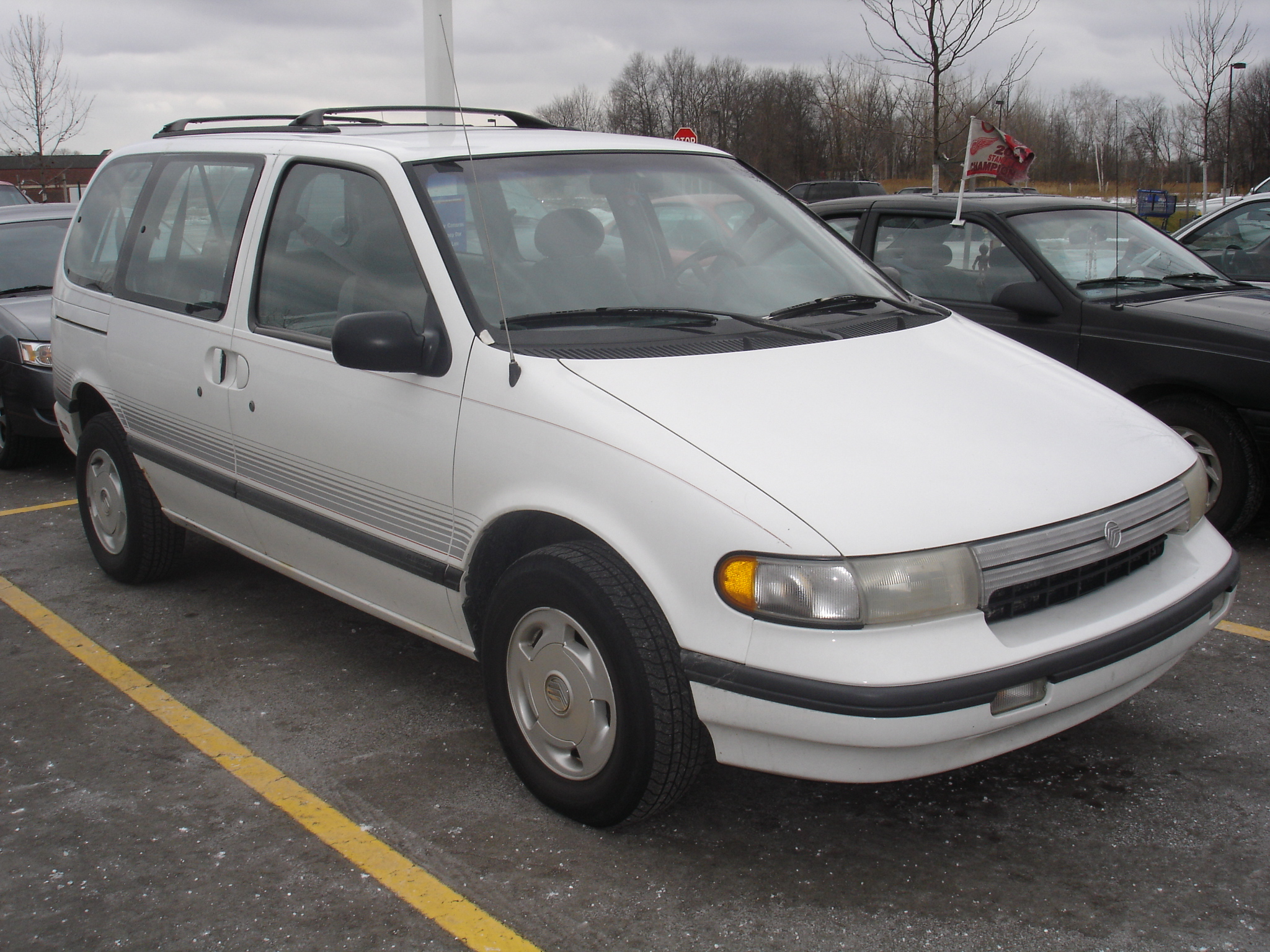
1993–1995 Villager GS

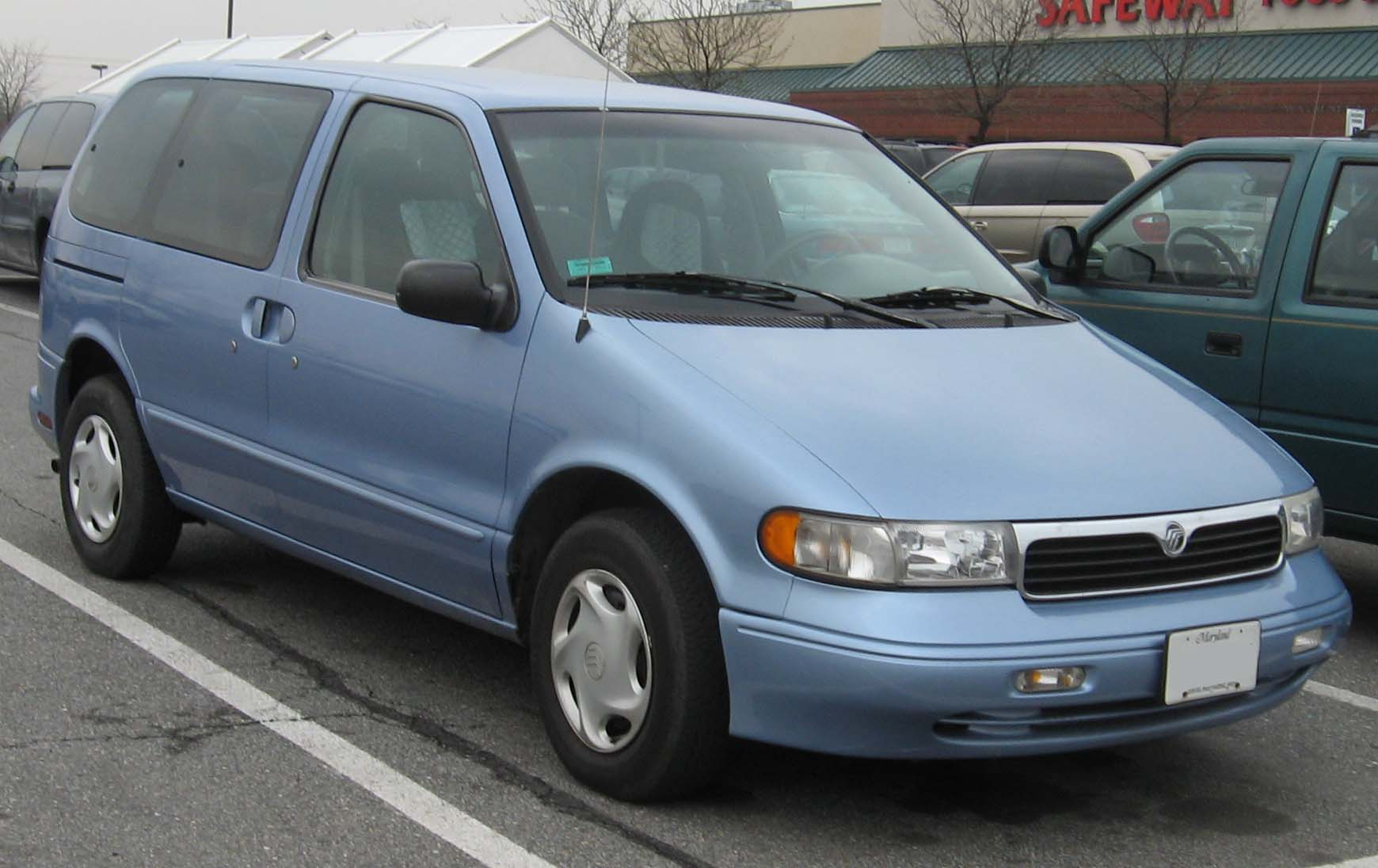
1996–1998 Villager GS

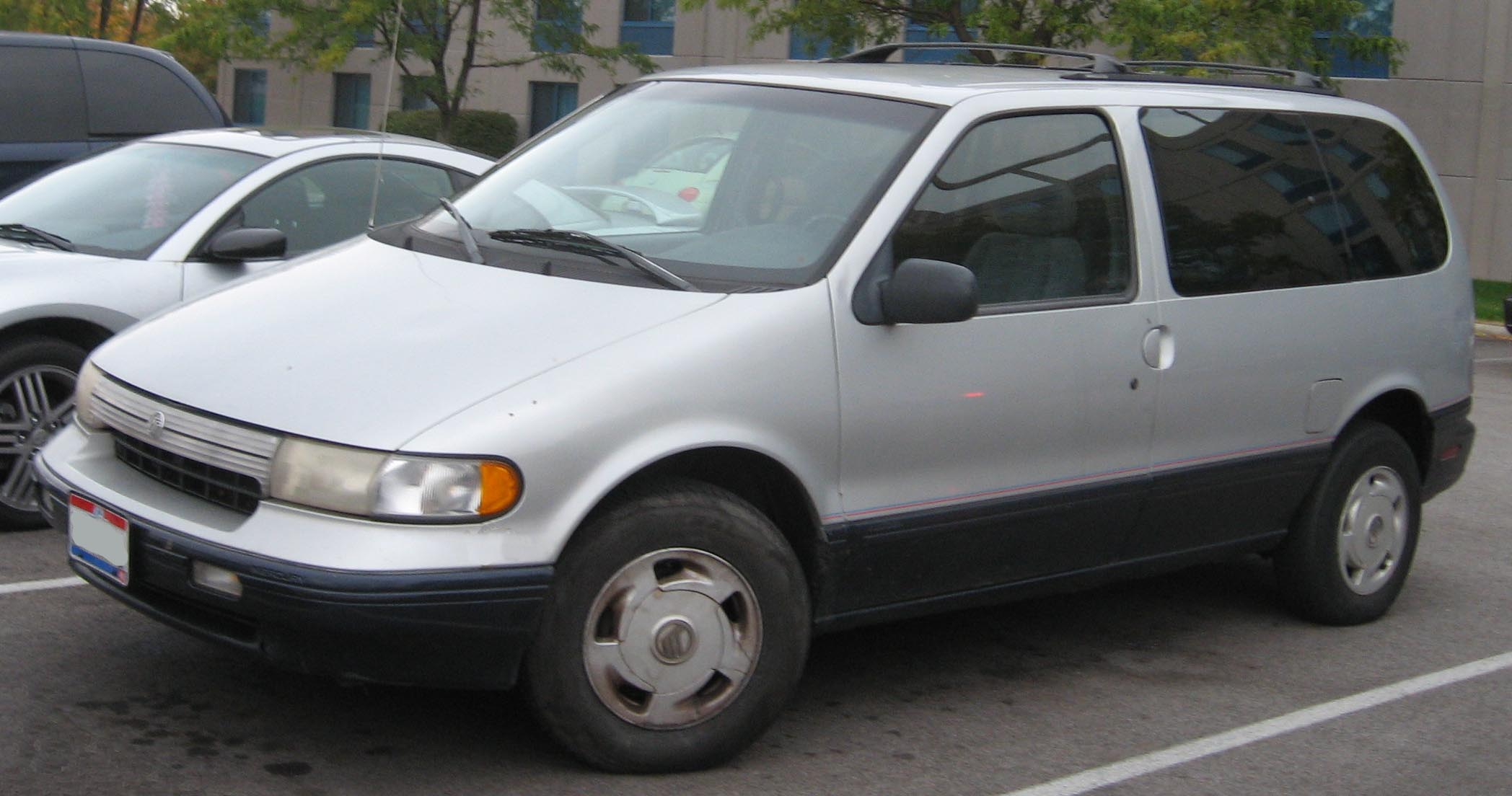
1993–1995 Villager LS

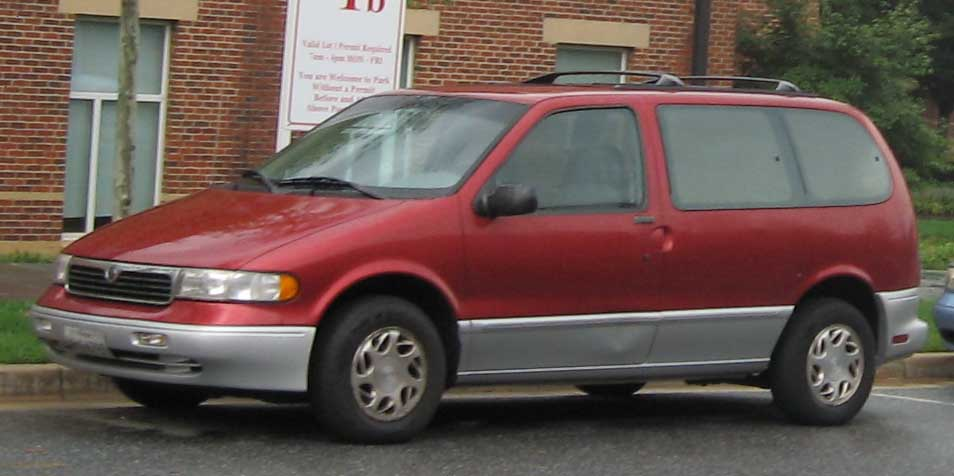
1996–1998 Villager LS

=== Trim ===
The first-generation Villager was offered in GS and LS trim levels, in line with Mercury sedans; the interior of the GS was fitted with a two-passenger bench seat while the LS was offered with either a bench seat or two bucket seats. The exterior of the GS was fitted with wide gray body moldings (similar to the 1992–1994 Mercury Grand Marquis), switching to body-color trim for 1996 (with optional two-tone trim). The Villager LS was styled with a standard two-tone exterior for its entire production.

==== Villager Nautica ====
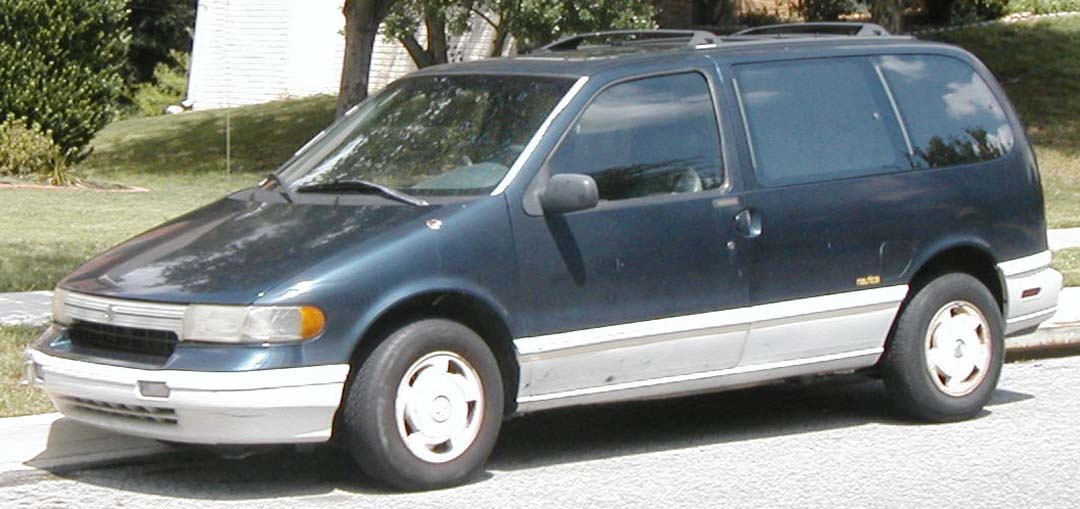
1994–1995 Mercury Villager Nautica

In 1994, Mercury introduced the Villager Nautica as a special-edition variant of the Villager LS. Externally denoted by a blue-and-white color scheme (with a yellow pinstripe), the Nautica was fitted with multi-color leather seats (blue with white inserts); a complimentary luggage set included Nautica-designed duffel bags. For 1996, multiple two-tone color schemes joined the blue/white exterior.

Though developed to complement Eddie Bauer-edition Ford vehicles (including the Aerostar minivan), the Villager would become the sole Nautica-edition Lincoln-Mercury vehicle ever produced.

== Second generation (1999–2002) ==
Second generation
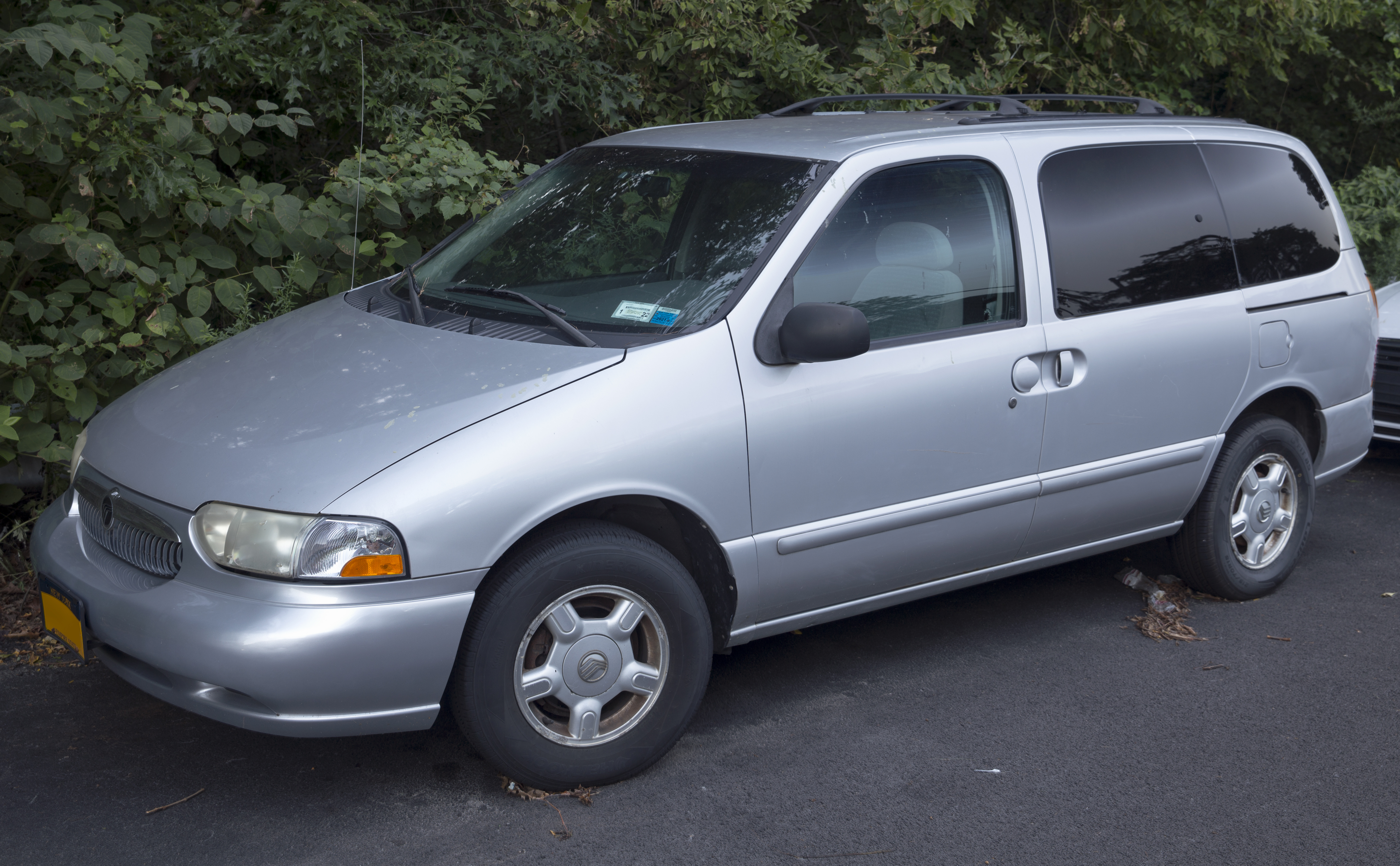

Overview
- Also called: Nissan Quest
- Production: 1998–2002
- Model years: 1999–2002
- Assembly: United States: Avon Lake, Ohio (Ohio Assembly)
- Designer: Moray Callum (1995)

Body and chassis
- Body style: 4-door minivan
- Platform: Ford VX54 platform

Powertrain
- Engine: 3.3 L VG33E SOHC V6
- Transmission: Jatco RE4F04A 4-speed automatic

Dimensions
- Wheelbase: 112.2 in (2,850 mm)
- Length: 194.7 in (1999–2000); 194.9 in (2001–02)
- Width: 74.9 in (1,902 mm)
- Height: 70.1 in (1,781 mm)
- Curb weight: 3,944 lb (1,789 kg)

For the 1999 model year, Mercury debuted the second-generation Villager. As with the previous generation, the model line was jointly developed by Ford and Nissan, who marketed the vehicle as the Nissan Quest. Sharing no sheetmetal with the previous generation, a central update in the redesign was the standardization of a driver-side sliding door (a feature not standardized on the larger Ford Windstar until 2002).

=== Chassis specification ===
The second-generation Villager retained the Ford VX54 platform from the previous generation, including its 112.2-inch wheelbase. Though retuned for a softer ride, the front MacPherson struts and a rear beam axle were also carried over. The front brakes were vented discs with rear drum brakes (4-wheel discs were dropped); the previously-standard anti-lock brakes were made optional.

==== Powertrain ====
The second-generation Villager again sourced its powertrain from Nissan, with its V6 enlarged to 3.3L (becoming the VG33E), producing 170hp; the engine was shared with Nissan light trucks and SUVs in the United States. As before, a Jatco-supplied 4-speed automatic was the sole transmission paired with the engine.

=== Body design ===
The second-generation Villager again was offered solely as a passenger van (in contrast to the Ford Windstar) and in a single body length (in contrast to both Chrysler and GM minivans). Five inches longer than the previous generation, the Villager was slightly larger than the Toyota Sienna. The single sliding door layout was retired, with all examples produced with two sliding doors.

Though the Villager and Quest shared the majority of their body stampings, the exteriors of the two vehicles were developed separately in the United States, with Ford designer Moray Callum responsible for the exterior of the Villager. The chrome-ringed horizontal grille was replaced by an oval waterfall-style grille topped by a horizontal trim bar (housing the Mercury emblem); in contrast to the Quest, the Villager was styled with a red trim panel between the taillamps (with amber turn signals). Though restyled slightly, the roofline retained much of its previous design; the integrated door handles and the two-way rear liftgate also made their return.

Carrying over the reconfigurable 3rd-row seat design from the previous generation, the cargo area was revised with the addition of a removable parcel shelf. For 2000, a 3-person 2nd-row seat was introduced (increasing capacity to 8) as an option. As a $1,295 option, a rear-seat entertainment system was introduced, including a flip-down LCD screen connected to a VCR or video-game console.

For 2001, the front and rear fascias were revised; the Mercury emblem was centered and enlarged on the grille and liftgate (the foglamps were changed to round lenses). The instrument panel was redesigned (the electronic instrument panel returned as an option).

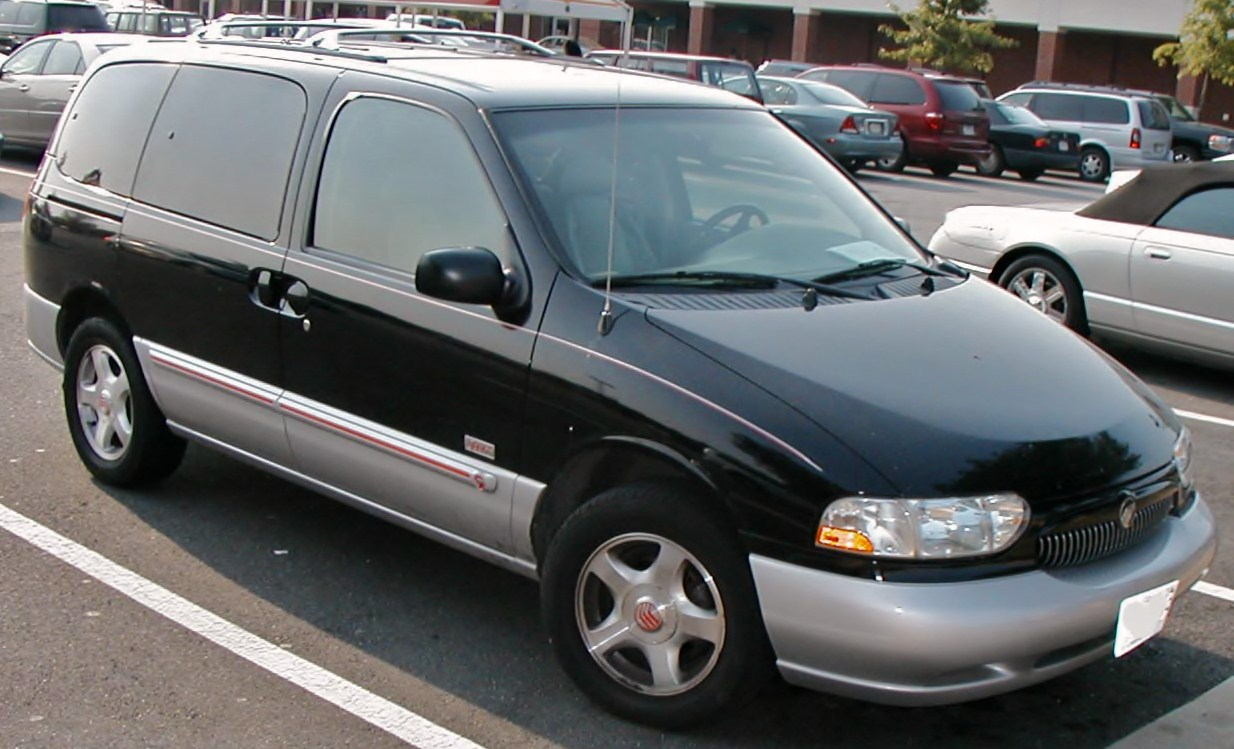
1999–2000 Villager Sport

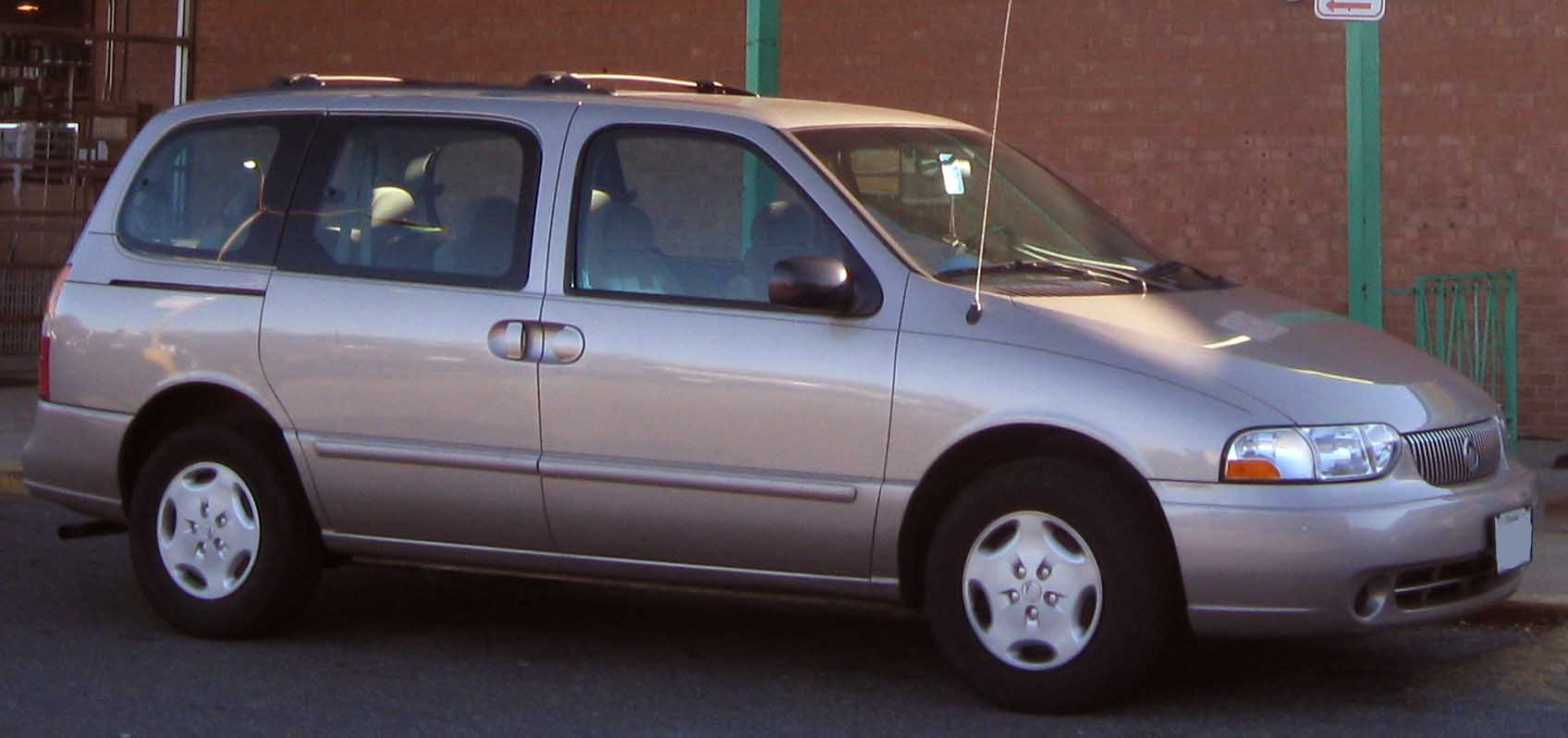
2001–2002 Villager (base)

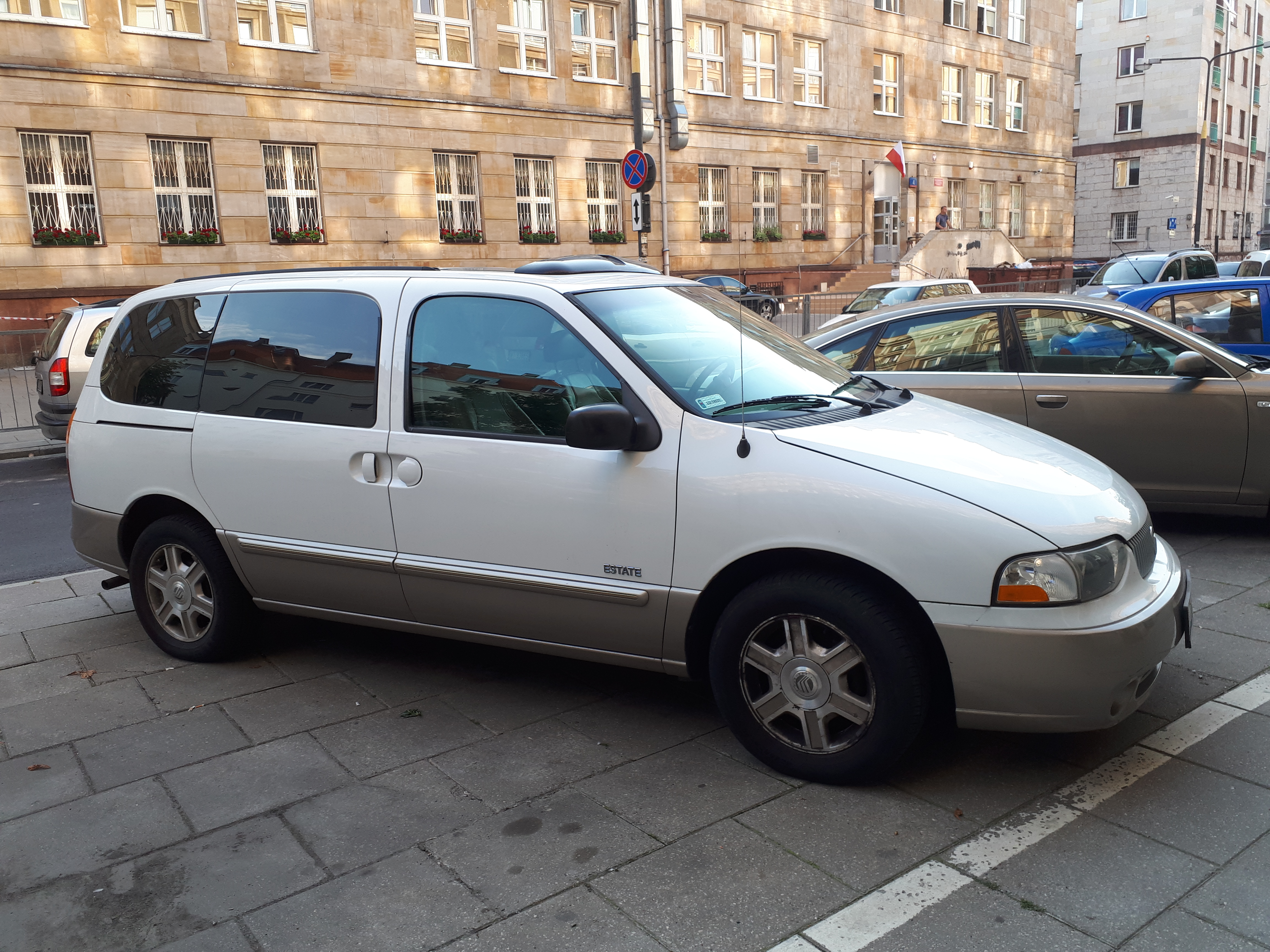
2001–2002 Villager Estate

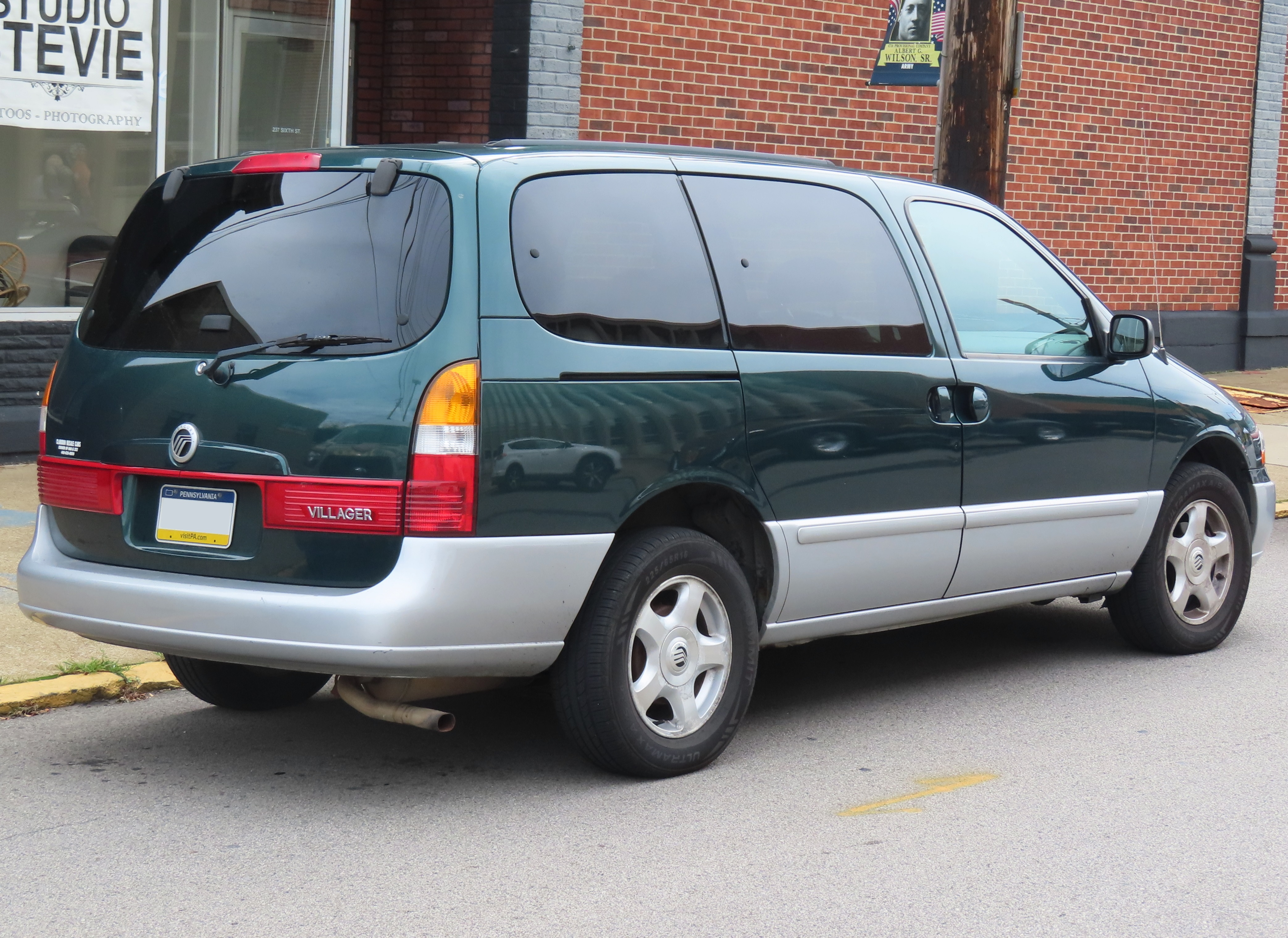
2002 Mercury Villager Popular, rear view

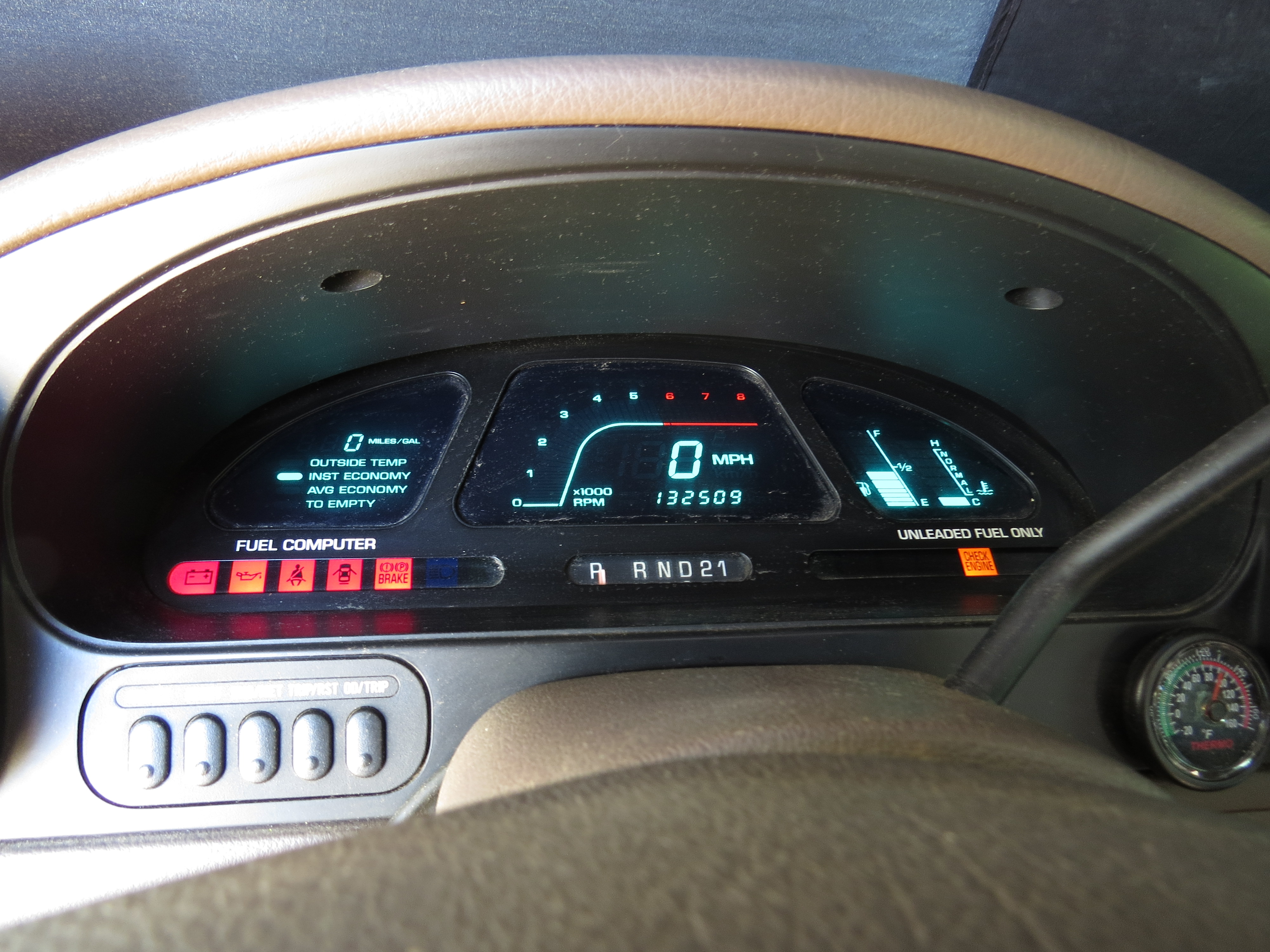
1999–2002 Villager electronic dashboard

=== Trim ===
Abandoning the GS/LS trim nomenclature used by the previous generation, the second-generation Villager was offered in three trim levels: Villager, Villager Sport, and Villager Estate; the special-edition Nautica trim was discontinued.

Externally, the standard Villager was offered in monochromatic colors or with a silver lower body; the Sport was painted with a gray lower body and received upgraded suspension settings and larger wheels and tires. The Estate was distinguished by a gold lower body, wheels, and badging.

== Sales ==
Calendar Year	American sales
1999	45,315
2000	30,443
2001	22,046
2002	16,442

== Chinese production ==
From 1995 to 2001, the first-generation Mercury Villager was marketed by Chinese auto manufacturers through the use of CKD kits. Guangzhou Yunbao (today part of Dongfeng Fengshen) marketed the Yunbao YB6480; traditionally using CKD vehicles from Nissan, the YB6480 retained its Mercury badging. As largely the same vehicle, Dongfeng Fengshen marketed the Villager as the Fengshen EQ6482. While the bodies were manufactured in the United States (for CKD purposes), the engines were manufactured in China (marketed through manufacturers in joint ventures with Nissan).

Through its passenger car division, Guangdong Bus Works produced the GDK6480; with nearly all assembly completed in the United States, only a few parts were added to the vehicle in China.

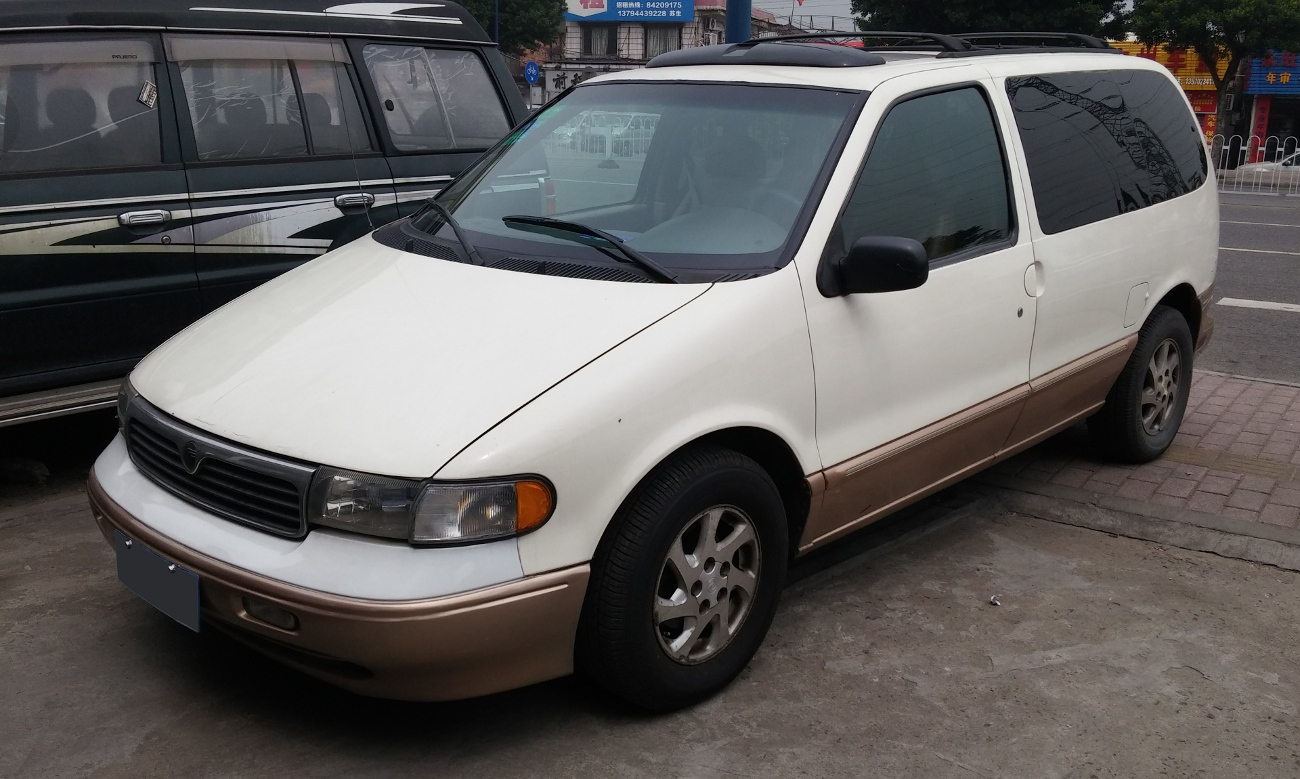
Guangdong Bus Works GDK6480 (Mercury Villager)

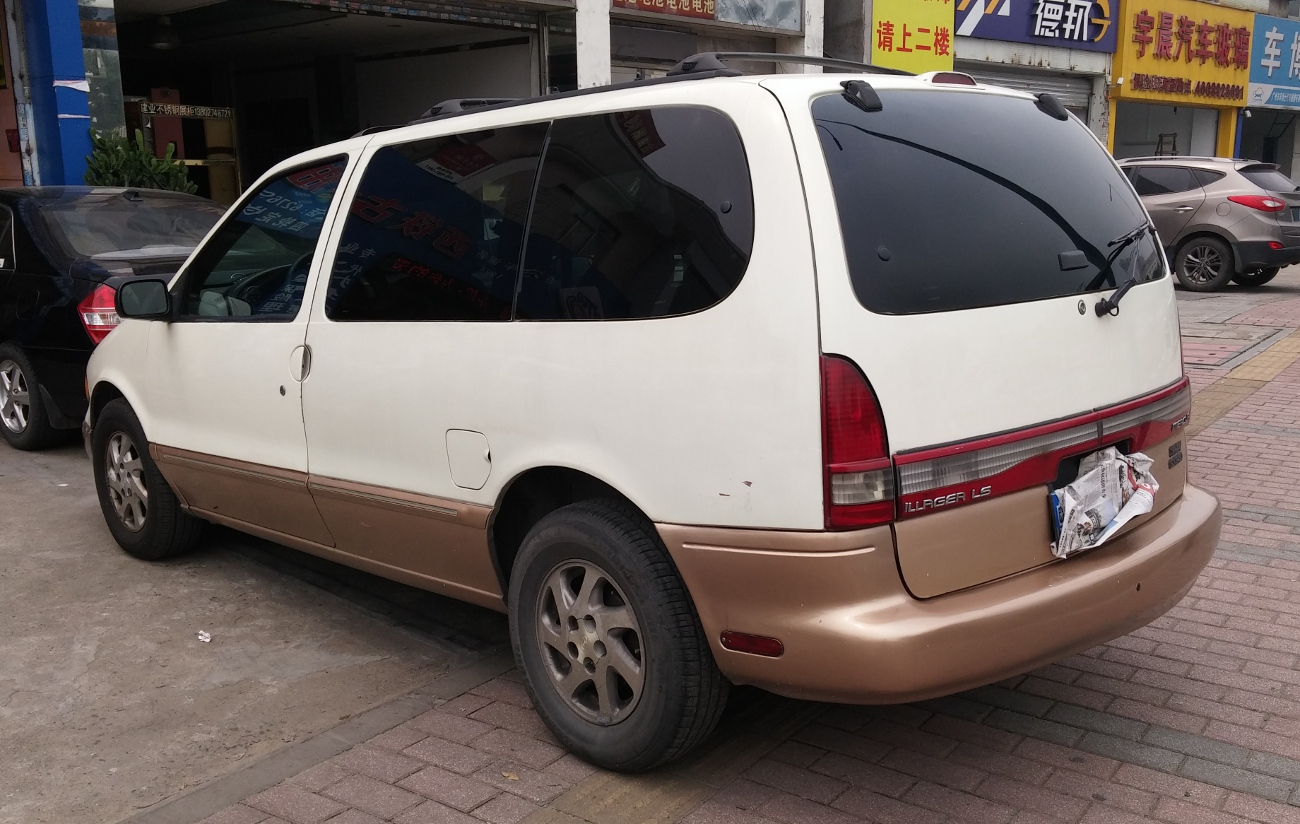
Guangdong Bus Works GDK6480 (Mercury Villager), rear view

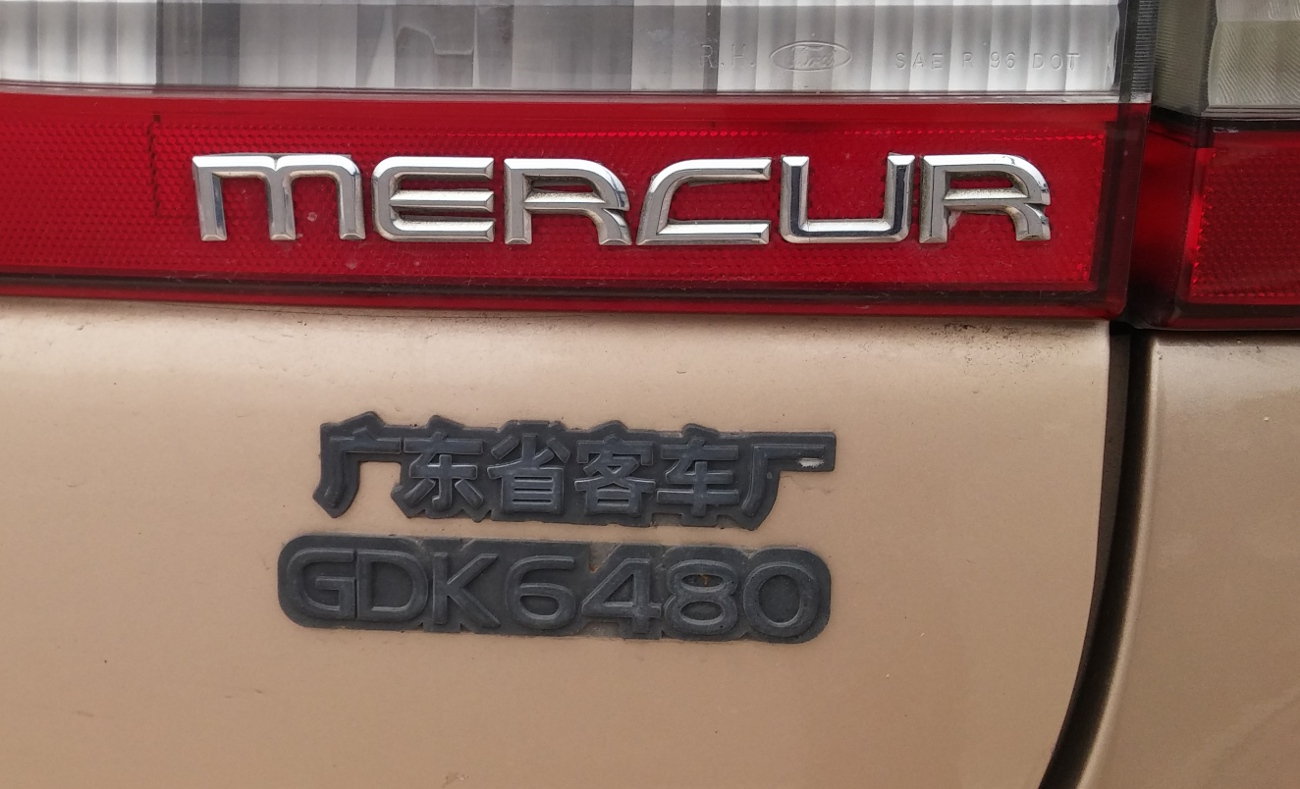
Guangdong Bus Works GDK6480 badging (below Mercury badging)

== Replacement ==
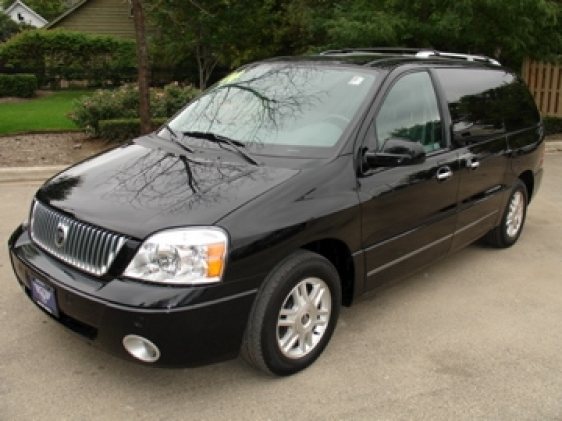
2004–2007 Mercury Monterey

In 2000, Ford and Nissan chose to end their joint venture, as both companies had commenced design work separately on their own front-wheel drive minivans. Following a shortened 2002 model year, the Ford-Nissan joint venture was concluded, with the final Mercury Villager assembled on June 27, 2002.

Both Mercury and Nissan skipped the 2003 model year with minivan sales, returning for 2004. Mercury replaced the Villager with the Mercury Monterey, its first Ford-based minivan (derived from the Ford Freestar, as Ford renamed the Windstar for 2004). Taking its name from a line of Mercury sedans produced for nearly 25 years, the Monterey was developed as a direct competitor for the Chrysler Town & Country and Buick Terraza (the renamed Oldsmobile Silhouette).

Coinciding with the declining sales of American-brand minivans, the Mercury Monterey struggled for market share and was discontinued alongside the Freestar after the 2007 model year.
