= Mitsubishi 3000GT =

Japanese front-engine sports coupe

Mitsubishi 3000GT (Z15A/Z16A)
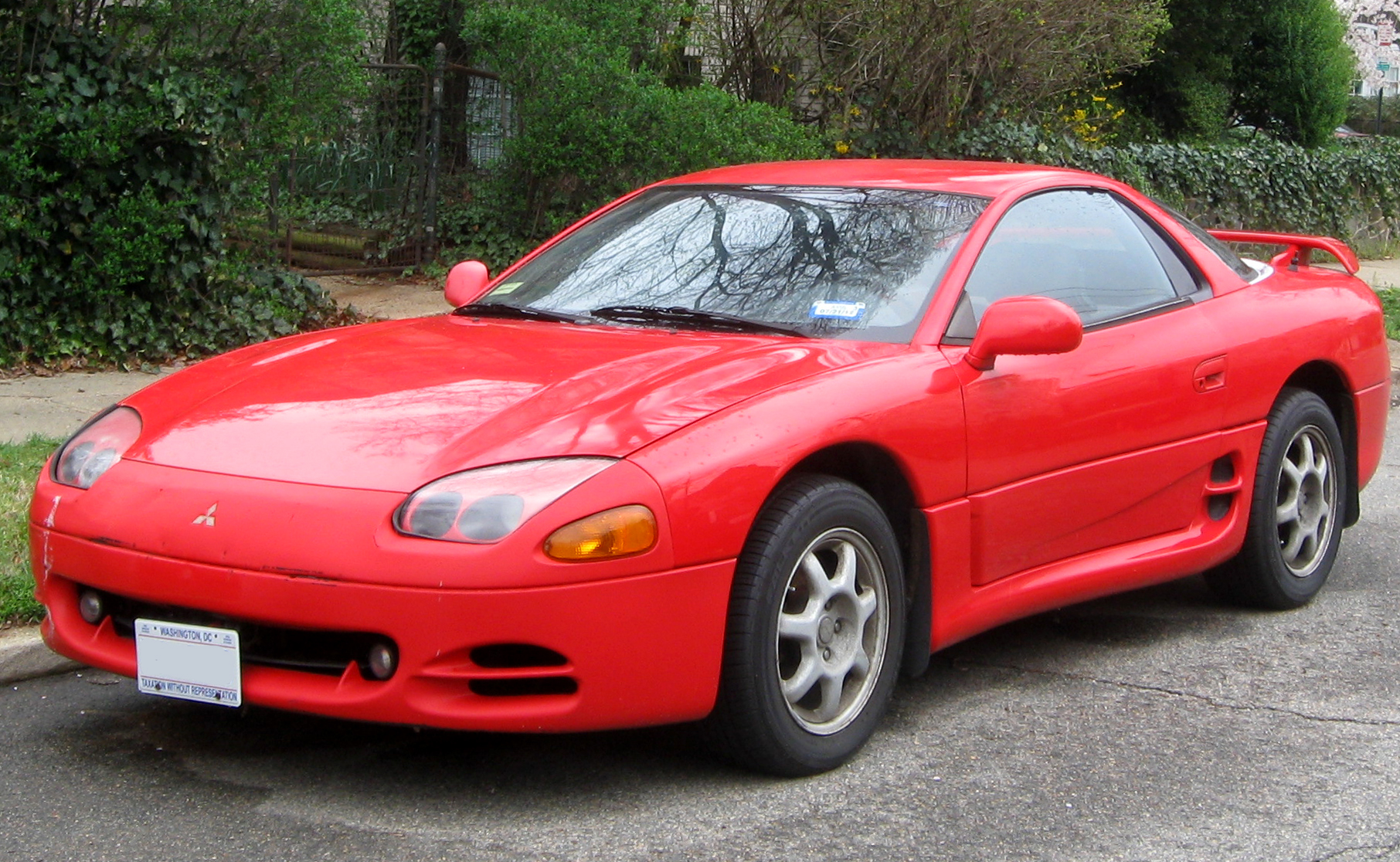
- Mitsubishi 3000GT

Overview
- Manufacturer: Mitsubishi Motors
- Model code: Z11A; Z15A/Z15AM; Z16A
- Also called: Mitsubishi GTO (Japan); Dodge Stealth; Sauber S1
- Production: 1991–1999 (Mitsubishi 3000GT); 1990–1996 (Dodge Stealth)
- Assembly: Japan: Okazaki, Aichi (Nagoya Plant)
- Designer: Masaru Suzuki (1987)

Body and chassis
- Class: Sports car (S); Grand tourer (S)
- Body style: 2-door liftback coupé; 2-door convertible (1995–1996)
- Layout: Transverse front-engine, front-/four-wheel drive
- Related: Mitsubishi Diamante/Sigma

Powertrain
- Engine: 3.0 L 6G72 SOHC V6; 3.0 L 6G72 DOHC 24v V6; 3.0 L 6G72 DOHC 24v twin-turbocharged V6
- Transmission: 4-speed automatic (INVECS introduced 1992); 5-speed manual; 6-speed manual (1993 onwards)

Dimensions
- Wheelbase: 2,470 mm (97.2 in)
- Length: 4,600 mm (181.1 in)
- Width: 1,840 mm (72.4 in)
- Height: 1,285 mm (50.6 in)
- Curb weight: 3,131 lb (1,420 kg) Base; 3,263 lb (1,480 kg) SL; 3,649 lb (1,655 kg) SL Spyder; 3,737 lb (1,695 kg) VR-4; 4,123 lb (1,870 kg) VR-4 Spyder

Chronology
- Predecessor: Mitsubishi Starion

The Mitsubishi 3000GT is a front-engine, all-wheel/front-wheel drive grand touring/sports car manufactured and marketed by Mitsubishi from 1990 until 2000 over three different series. Manufactured in a three-door hatchback coupé body style in Nagoya, Japan, the 2+2 four-seaters were marketed in the Japanese domestic market as the GTO, and globally as 3000GT. In North America, it was sold both as the Mitsubishi 3000GT (1991–1999) and the Dodge Stealth (1991–1996), a badge engineered, mechanically identical captive import. As a collaborative effort between Chrysler and Mitsubishi Motors, Chrysler was responsible for the Stealth's exterior styling.

The car was based on Mitsubishi's Sigma/Diamante and retained their transverse mounted 3-liter, 24-valve V6 engines and front-wheel-drive layout. The GTO's engines were naturally aspirated or with twin-turbochargers and were also available with active aerodynamics (automatically adjusting front and rear spoilers), four-wheel-steering, full-time all-wheel-drive and adaptive suspension.

Mitsubishi marketed a retractable hardtop variant, which were engineered and converted from coupé models in California by ASC, and sold as the GT Spyder or VR4 Spyder for model years 1993–1995. These were the first fully automated retractable hardtop marketed since the 1959 Ford Skyliner.

The JDM model took its name from the Galant GTO, a two-door hardtop coupé marketed by the company in the early 1970s, which in turn took its name from the Ferrari 250 GTO, short for Gran Turismo Omologata – "Omologata" signifying that it met motorsport homologation requirements.

== Overview ==
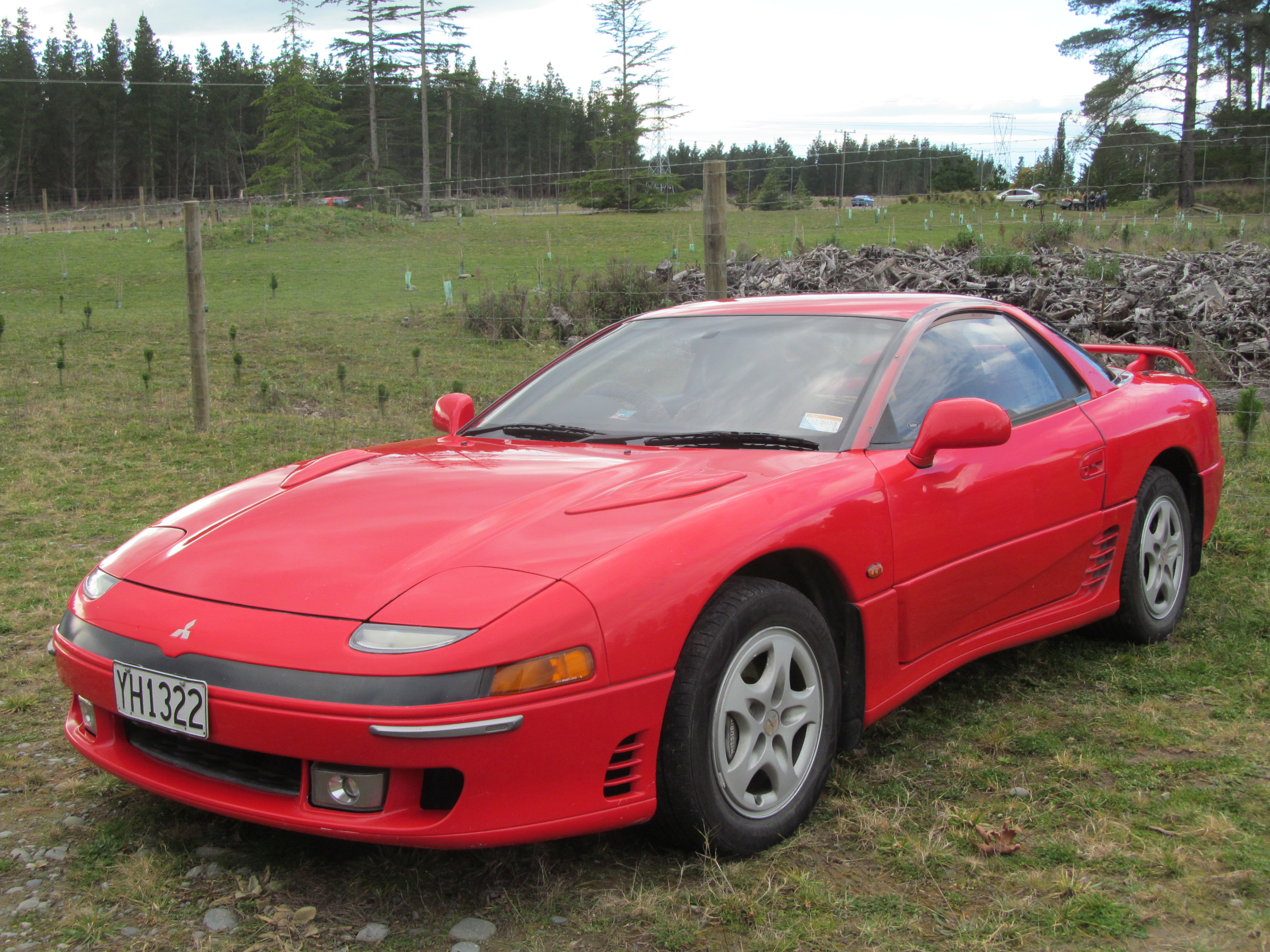
1991 Mitsubishi GTO

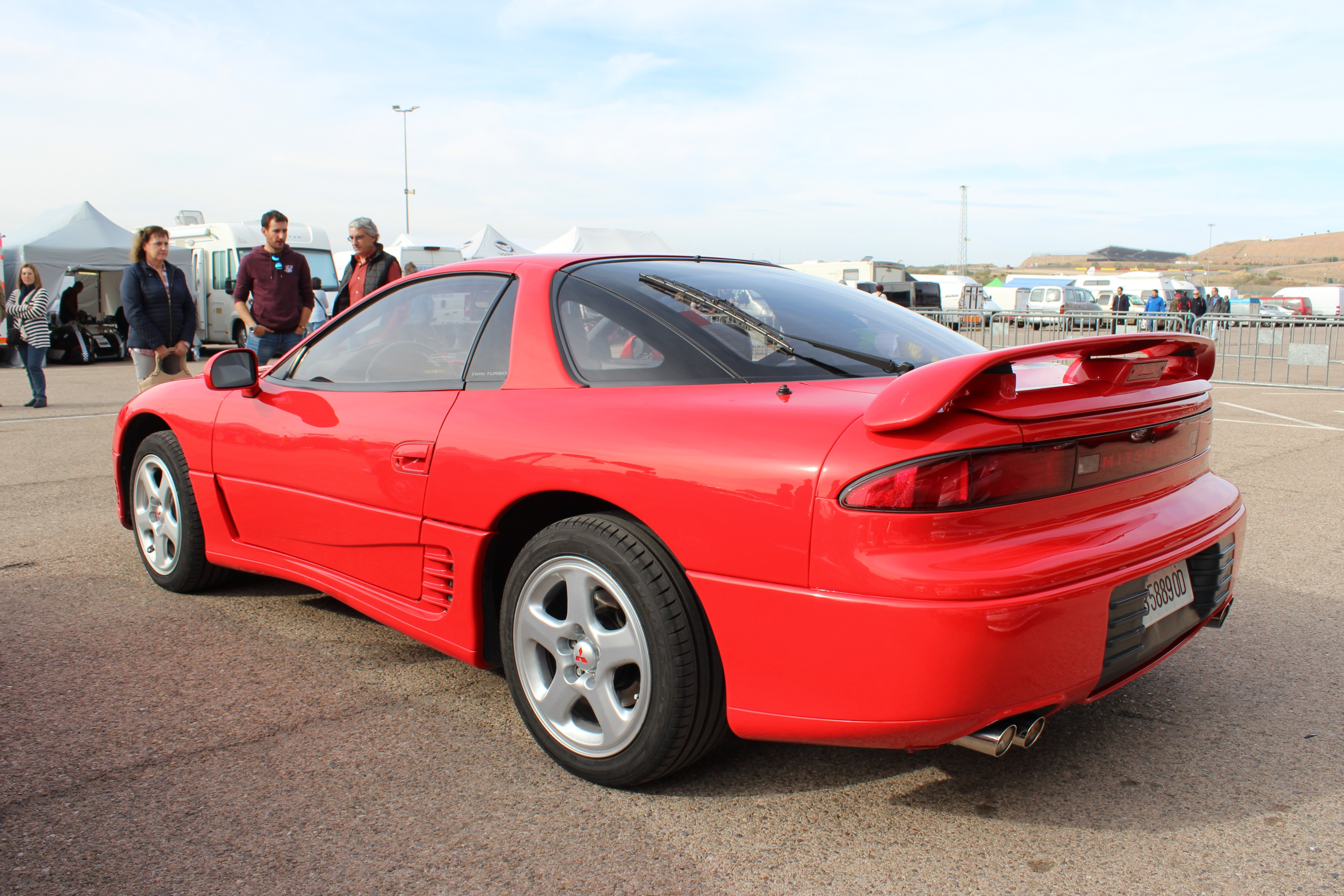
Rear view

Following the successful showing of the Mitsubishi HSR and Mitsubishi HSX concept cars at the 1989 Tokyo Motor Show, Mitsubishi unveiled the new GTO as a 2+2 seating grand touring car in order to compete with the Mazda RX-7, Nissan 300ZX, Honda NSX, Subaru SVX, and the Toyota Supra. They resurrected the GTO name, and the car went on to serve as Mitsubishi's flagship for the remainder of the decade. Despite the cachet of the badge at home, it was marketed as the Mitsubishi 3000GT and as the Dodge Stealth outside Japan; the company was concerned that connoisseurs would object to the evocative nameplate from the Ferrari 250 GTO and Pontiac GTO being used on a Japanese vehicle.

Each was built on the same production line at Mitsubishi's plant in Nagoya, Japan. Its Japanese introduction coincided with the softening Japanese economy, subsequently known as the "bubble economy".

JDM GTOs were marketed at Mitsubishi's Car Plaza retail chain, with JDM buyers paying additional annual road tax as well as elevated taxes for being classified as a large car by Japan's exterior dimension regulations.

A Dodge Stealth was scheduled as a 1991 Indianapolis 500 pace car until the United Auto Workers (UAW) rejected it because of its Japanese rather than US manufacture. A prototype of the Dodge Viper was substituted in place of it. Still used as a backup pace car, eventual race winner Rick Mears received a Dodge Stealth for winning the race and dealers sold pace car replica editions, as the Viper did not begin production until later that year.

Approximately 86,151 3000GTs and 65,303 Stealths were produced.

== 1990–1993 (Series 1) ==
Early models were internally designated Z16A and incorporated full-time four-wheel drive and four-wheel steering which was labeled as Mitsubishi AWC. Active aerodynamics called "Active Aero Control System" enhanced the coke bottle silhouette body styling, achieving a drag coefficient of Cd=0.33, with automatically deploying front and rear spoilers, sport/tour exhaust modes called "Active Exhaust System", pop-up headlights and articulated blister caps on the hood to accommodate the ECS controllers at the top of the strut turrets. The Dodge Stealth featured a signature cross-hair front bumper fascia, different B-pillar and quarter window treatments, and crescent-shaped rear spoiler — and did not include active aerodynamics. In 1993, the engine went to a 4-bolt main and a forged crankshaft, some of the early production models still received the cast crank.

=== North American market ===
In North America, both the Mitsubishi 3000GT as well as the Dodge Stealth were available. Two different powertrains were offered on the 3000GT while the Stealth had three different options. The base 3-door hatchback Stealth came equipped with a 3.0-liter 12-valve SOHC V6 engine producing 164 hp (122 kW) at 5,500rpm. The base 3000GT and SL model and the Dodge Stealth ES and R/T model came equipped with a 3.0-liter DOHC V6 engine producing 222 hp (166 kW). The VR-4 (Viscous Realtime 4WD) and R/T Turbo came equipped with a twin turbocharged 3.0-liter DOHC V6 engine producing 300 hp (224 kW) at 5,500 rpm. A 5-speed Getrag 440 manual transmission was standard and a 4-speed INVECS automatic was an option on all models except the turbocharged variants. The 3000GT SL and Stealth R/T included an electronically controlled suspension as well as other features such as anti-lock brakes and automatic climate control while the turbocharged models further added performance options such as permanent 4-wheel drive, 4-wheel steering, limited-slip differential, active aerodynamics and came with Z rated 17-inch tires.

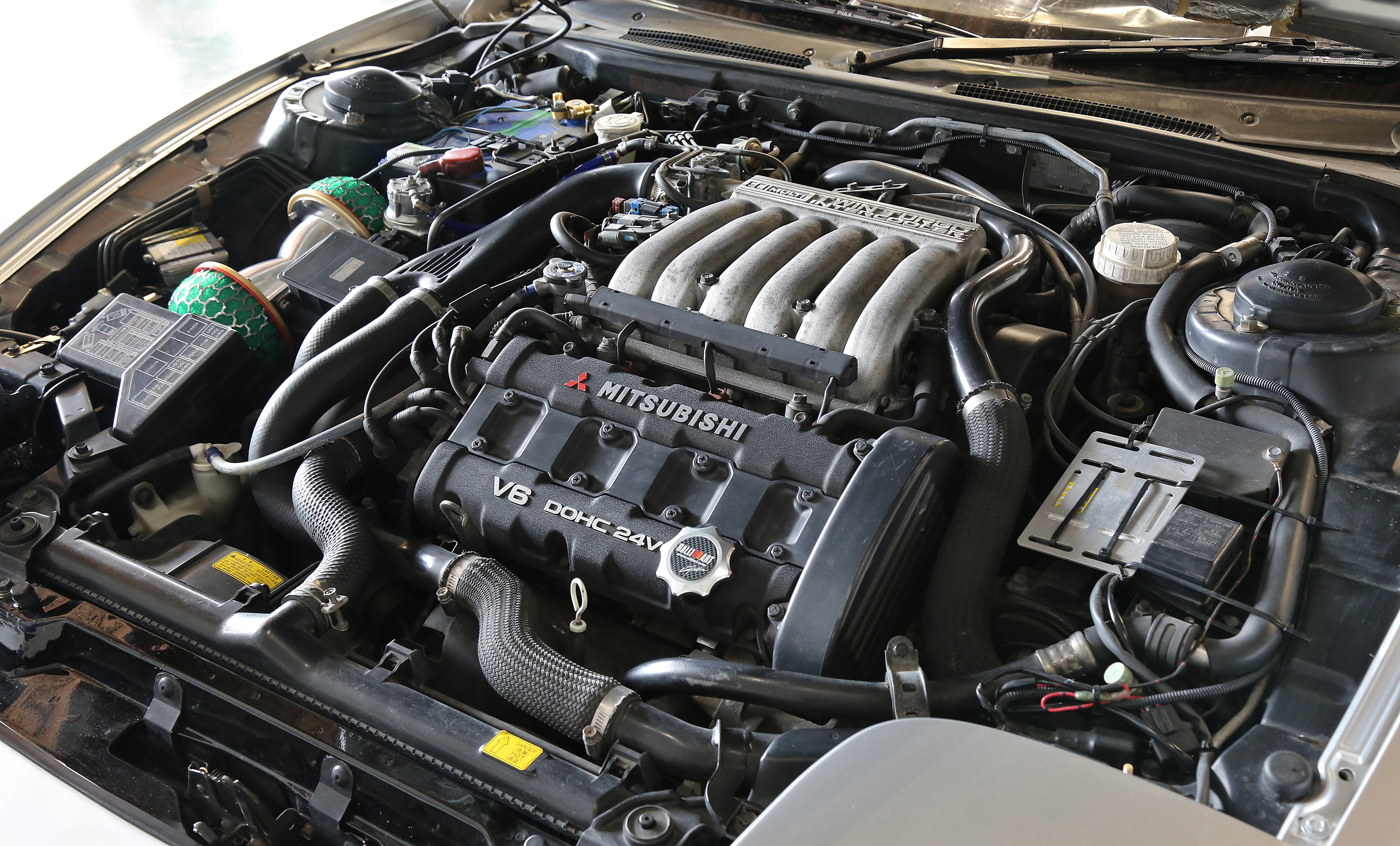
Twin turbo DOHC 6G72 engine

=== European market ===
In Europe, instead of the Mitsubishi-built TD04-09B turbochargers used on Japanese and US Twin Turbo models that generated 9 psi (0.6 bar), the EU-spec model received the higher capacity TD04-13G turbochargers which generated 13 psi (0.9 bar). While power output is no higher than contemporary market models, these have lower discharge temperatures to better handle the prolonged high speeds possible on the German Autobahn, along with an upgraded transmission. The engine was rated at 286 PS (210 kW; 282 hp); the modifications took time and European models only went on sale in the autumn of 1992.

=== Reviews and performance ===
Automotive magazines quoted 0-60 mph (97 km/h) acceleration times ranging from 4.9 seconds to 6.0 seconds and quarter mile times of 13.6-13.9 seconds at 95–98 mph (153–158 km/h) Dodge claims a 0-60 of 4.89 seconds for the 1991 R/T turbo models.

Magazines from the era praised its strong acceleration and grip as well as its full time AWD system allowing for all season use. In a comparison test by AutoWeek the $34,423 ($81,369 in 2025 dollars) 1991 Mitsubishi 3000GT VR-4 did 0-60 mph in 5.1 seconds beating the lighter $61,000 ($144,191 in 2025 dollars) Acura NSX which hit 60 mph in 5.3 seconds.

Model name	Engine	Peak power	Peak torque
Dodge Stealth (United States, Canada)	SOHC 12v V6	122 kW (166 PS; 164 hp) at 5,500 rpm	251 N⋅m (185 lb⋅ft) at 4,000 rpm
Mitsubishi GTO SR (Japan)	DOHC 24v V6	168 kW (228 PS; 225 hp) at 6,000 rpm	275 N⋅m (203 lb⋅ft) at 4,500 rpm
Mitsubishi 3000GT, 3000GT SL (United States); Dodge Stealth ES, Stealth R/T (United States, Canada)	DOHC 24v V6	166 kW (225 PS; 222 hp) at 6,000 rpm	272 N⋅m (201 lb⋅ft) at 4,500 rpm
Mitsubishi GTO Twin Turbo (Japan)	DOHC 24v V6 twin turbo	206 kW (280 PS; 276 hp) at 6,000 rpm	417 N⋅m (308 lb⋅ft) at 2,500 rpm
Mitsubishi 3000GT VR-4 (United States); Dodge Stealth R/T Twin-Turbo (United States, Canada)	DOHC 24v V6 twin turbo	224 kW (304 PS; 300 hp) at 6,000 rpm	417 N⋅m (308 lb⋅ft) at 2,500 rpm
Mitsubishi 3000GT (Europe)	DOHC 24v V6 twin turbo	210 kW (286 PS; 282 hp) at 6,000 rpm	407 N⋅m (300 lb⋅ft) at 3,000 rpm

== 1994–1996 (Series 2) ==
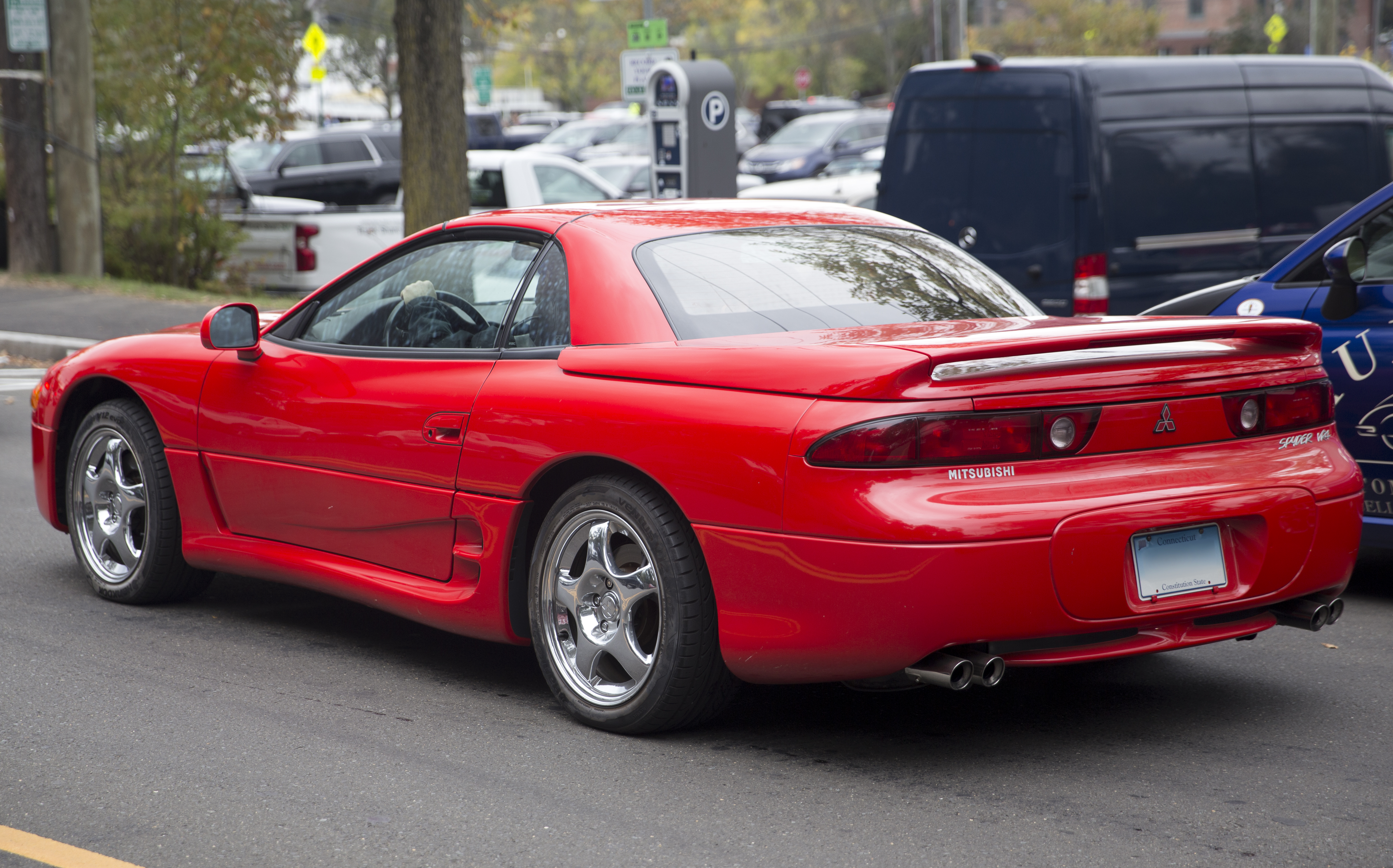
The 1995-1996 3000GT VR-4 Spyder with the retractable hardtop in the up position.

Facelift models were internally designated Z15A (2WS) and Z16A (4WS) and featured a revised front bumper to accommodate projector beam headlights and small, round projector fog lights. They were unveiled in August 1993 in Japan and gradually made their way to other markets as the earlier cars sold out. Some markets, such as the UK, did not get these models until as late as 1996. The caps on the hood were replaced with integrated sheet metal blisters, and revised side air vents and rear bumpers were added. The interior was redesigned with dual air bags, a new audio system, and revised air conditioning refrigerant. The engines in the twin-turbo models received an increase to 320 hp (239 kW) and an increase in torque from 307 to 315 lb⋅ft (416 to 427 N⋅m). As a result Japanese models received an increase in torque, but the power rating remained unchanged at 280 PS (206 kW; 276 hp).

The VR-4 model now included a six-speed Getrag 446 manual transmission with revised gear ratios. Larger wheel/tire combinations were available beginning in 1995. The base and SL model received 16-inch wheels in silver or chrome with 225/55 tires, while the VR-4 now had 18-inch chrome wheels with 245/40 tires (the Spyder had the standard 17-inch with higher profile tires from 1994 to handle the additional 400 lb (180 kg) of weight).

With subsequent price increases, features were discontinued: the tunable exhaust was phased out after 1994 model year, the ECS after 1995 model year, and the active aerodynamics disappeared after 1996. This was also when Chrysler ceased sales of the Dodge Stealth captive import, and for the remainder of its life only Mitsubishi-badged versions were available.

=== Spyder ===
Chrysler and Mitsubishi worked with ASC to engineer and convert 3000GTs into retractable hardtops, marketed as the Spyder SL and Spyder VR4 for 1995 and 1996 model years.

In 1995, Mitsubishi's 3000GT Spyder was available in four color combinations: red with grey leather interior, black with ivory leather interior, white pearl with grey, and martinique yellow with ivory leather interior. In 1996 the 3000GT Spyder was available in red with tan interior, black pearl with tan leather, white pearl with tan leather interior, and green pearl with tan leather. SL Spyders were only available with an automatic transmission while the VR4 Spyder was only available with a 6-speed manual transmission.

=== GTO MR ===
The GTO MR model appeared in the Japanese market in August 1994. The ‘Mitsubishi Racing’ or MR moniker, has been used on a few other performance Mitsubishis such as the Lancer Evolution, and usually meant a lighter model. The GTO MR was essentially a lightweight GTO Twin Turbo that deleted 4WS, ABS, ECS and Active Aero, but was mechanically identical to the normal GTO Twin Turbo aside from a final drive ratio of 4.154. Available as an option were AP Racing 6 pot brakes, used on the N1 spec GTO. Chassis numbers for the MR start with Z15A. This lowered the weight of the MR to 1,650 kg (3,638 lb). The AWD system featured in the MR received the same 45% front 55% rear split ratio as the other turbo models.

Best Motoring, a Japanese television program about Japanese cars, featured the 1994 GTO MR in an hour long program where it beat the lighter R32 Skyline GT-R over a mile in acceleration.

=== Beckenbauer edition ===
In 1994, Mitsubishi released a limited edition of what was now the previous generation 3000GT, branded as "Beckenbauer Edition." Honoring Franz Beckenbauer. All were painted Lamborghini yellow and were equipped with a Remus sports exhaust, OZ Futura rims, a numbered plate signed by Beckenbauer, and a C-Netz mobile phone system. Only 30 were made, sold through 1995.

=== Reception ===
The redesign of the second generation 3000GT brought it up to date, especially through the loss of pop-up headlights and the front strut caps and resulting smoother hood. The Tuneable Exhaust System was phased out in 1995 and the Active Aero was phased out in 1996. A notable change was the brake redesign, facelift models received 2-piston rear brake calipers and larger front brakes that showed no sign of fading under heavy use unlike the early models. Braking distances improved slightly. The new 6-speed was geared well and paired with the extra horsepower and torque allowed the car to out-accelerate its rivals from a standing start. These changes made all models lighter, the VR-4 was now 3,737 pounds (1,695 kg) and the SL 3,263 pounds (1,480 kg).

Road tests at the time showed the second generation 3000GT VR-4 to be capable of 60 mph (97 km/h) in 4.8 - 5.4 seconds and the quarter mile in 13.5 seconds at 101 to 105 miles per hour (163 to 169 km/h), making it faster in a straight line than the Nissan 300ZX Twin Turbo and Mazda RX-7 Twin Turbo. Though heavy, it was comfortable and easy to drive fast. Thanks to the ample power, it could be taken around a track quickly, with noted under steer and a lack of feedback.

Model name	Engine	Peak power	Peak torque
Dodge Stealth (US, Canada)	SOHC 12v V6	119 kW (162 PS; 160 hp) at 5,500 rpm	250 N⋅m (184 lb⋅ft) at 4,000 rpm
Mitsubishi 3000GT, 3000GT SL, 3000GT SL Spyder (US); Mitsubishi GTO SR (Japan); Dodge Stealth R/T (US, Canada)	DOHC 24v V6	166 kW (226 PS; 223 hp) at 6,000 rpm	277 N⋅m (204 lb⋅ft) at 4,500 rpm
Mitsubishi GTO twin turbo, GTO MR (Japan)	DOHC 24v V6 twin turbo	206 kW (280 PS; 276 hp) at 6,000 rpm	427 N⋅m (315 lb⋅ft) at 2,500 rpm
Mitsubishi 3000GT VR-4, Spyder (US); Dodge Stealth R/T twin-turbo (US, Canada)	DOHC 24v V6 twin turbo	239 kW (324 PS; 320 hp) at 6,000 rpm	427 N⋅m (315 lb⋅ft) at 2,500 rpm

== 1997–2000 (Series 3) ==
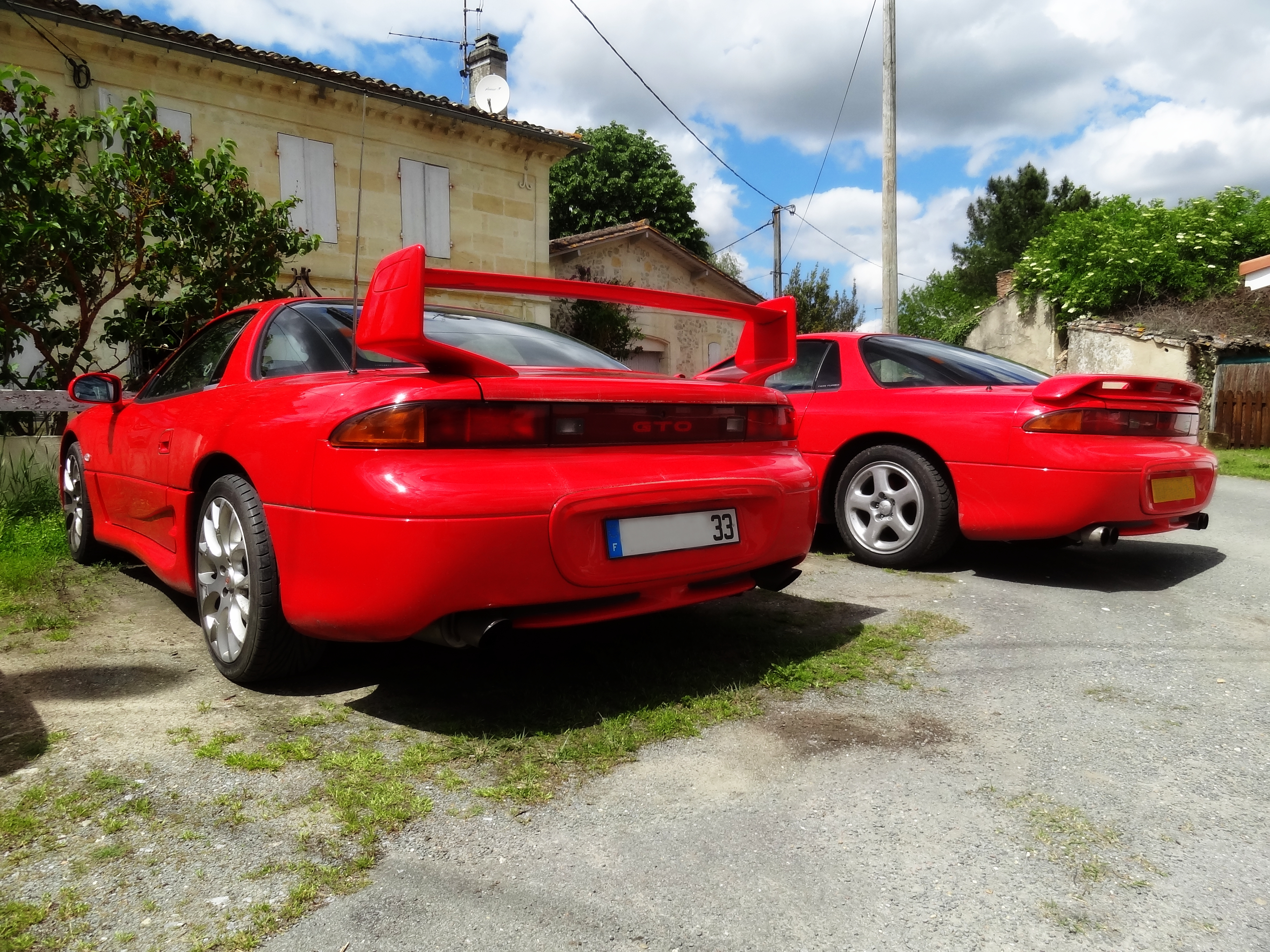
The 1999 VR-4 featured a distinct inverted airfoil spoiler

The SOHC engine was added to the Mitsubishi 3000GTs after the discontinuation of the Stealth. The 3000GT's featuring the single cam engine had a weight of 3,131 pounds (1,420 kg) provided that they were not offered with the sunroof and leather seats.

The 1997-2000 3000GTs are separated by pre- or post-facelift. Slower sales in the American sports car market led to the major facelift plans for 1997 being abandoned. Minor cosmetic changes were implemented instead including a new front bumper and rainbow-shaped arched type wing.

In 1999, the car received its last exterior makeover facelift; with the new aggressive front bumper, headlamps, turn signals and sail panels. A true inverted airfoil spoiler coined the "Combat Wing" only for the 1999 VR-4 were used to distinguish it from previous models. Non-Turbo models did not receive the "Combat Wing" and kept the arched spoiler from the pre-facelift. 1999 was the final year the 3000GT was available in the U.S. market. With sales slowing to a trickle and new side impact regulations looming, production for the Japanese domestic market finally ceased in 2000. A last two cars were sold the following year. In a test by Popular Mechanics the USDM 1999 3000GT VR-4 ran a 13.44 seconds quarter mile (~402 m) at 101.7 mph (163.7 km/h).

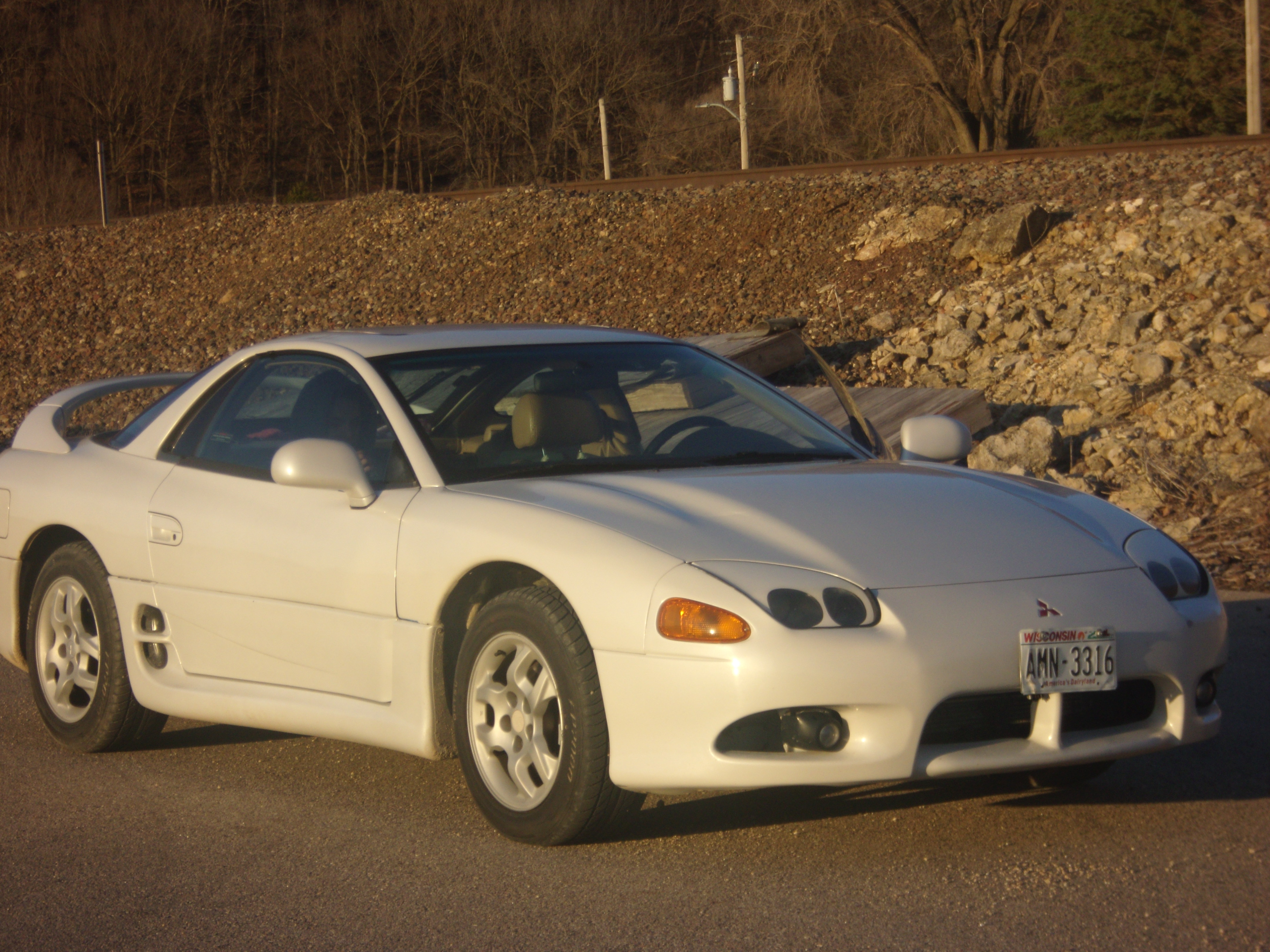
Pre-1999 facelift with new bumper and rainbow-arched wing

Model name	Engine	Peak power	Peak torque
Mitsubishi 3000GT (United States)	SOHC 12v V6	121 kW (164 PS; 162 hp) at 5,500 rpm	250 N⋅m (184 lb⋅ft) at 4,000 rpm
Mitsubishi 3000GT SL (United States); Mitsubishi GTO SR (Japan)	DOHC 24v V6	168 kW (228 PS; 225 hp) at 6,000 rpm	277 N⋅m (204 lb⋅ft) at 4,500 rpm
Mitsubishi GTO twin turbo, Mitsubishi GTO MR (Japan)	DOHC 24v V6 twin turbo	206 kW (280 PS; 276 hp) at 6,000 rpm	427 N⋅m (315 lb⋅ft) at 2,500 rpm
Mitsubishi 3000GT VR-4 (United States)	DOHC 24v V6 twin turbo	239 kW (324 PS; 320 hp) at 6,000 rpm	427 N⋅m (315 lb⋅ft) at 2,500 rpm

== Gallery ==
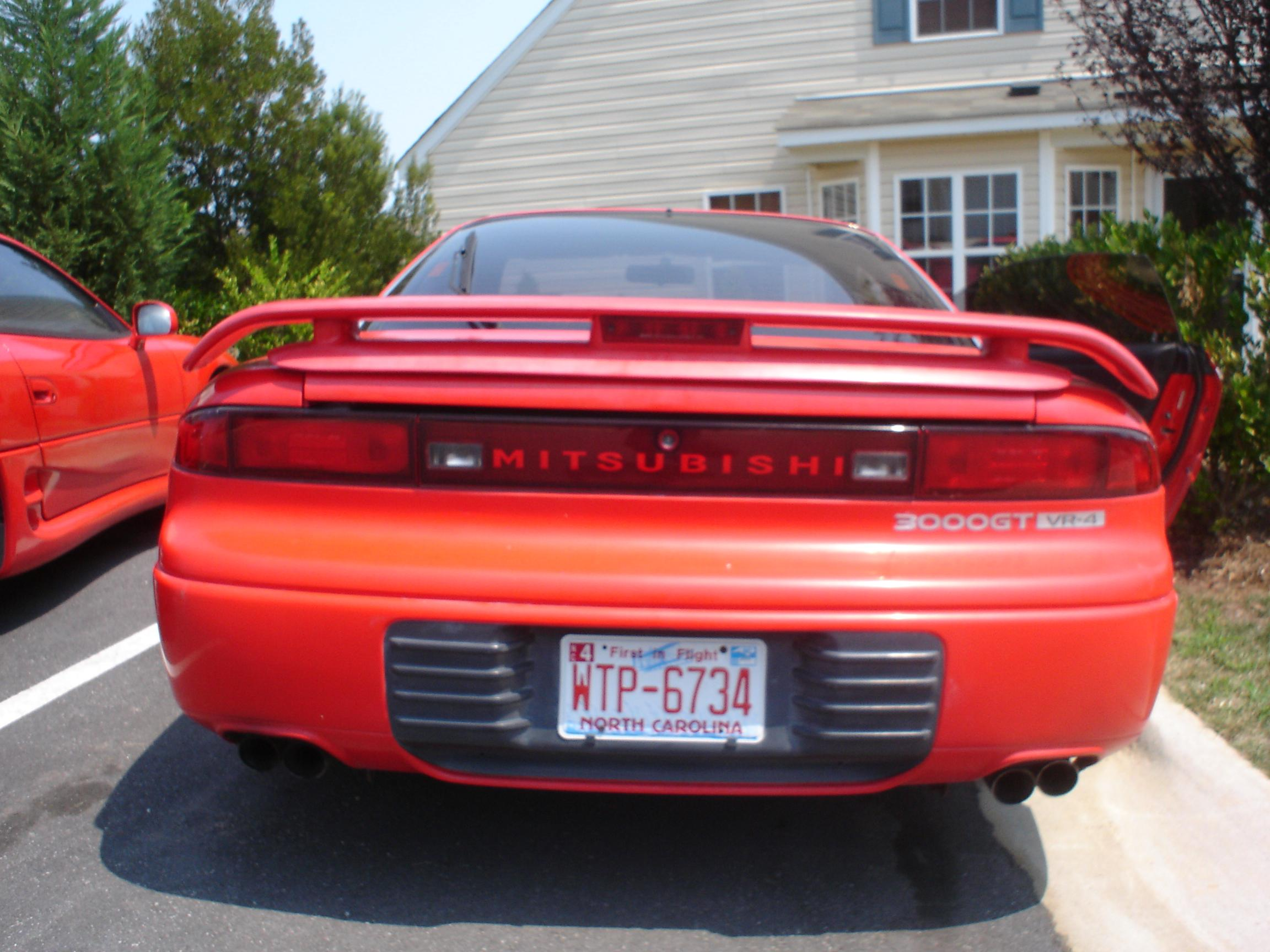
The Active Aero spoiler on a 1992 3000GT VR-4

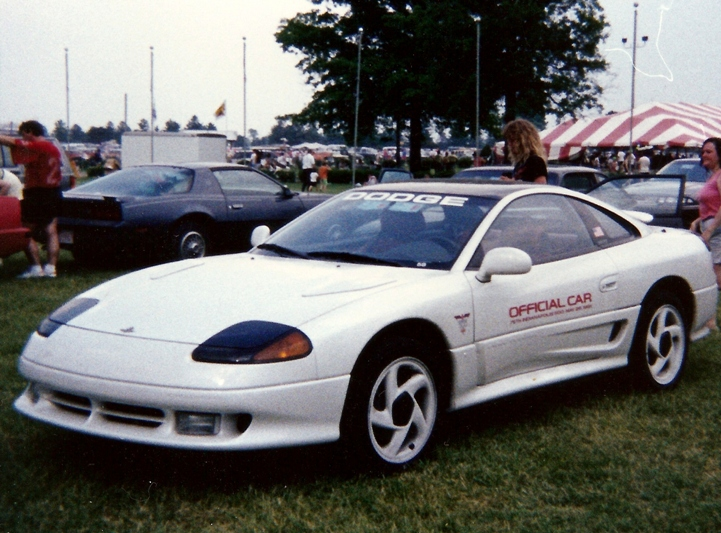
1991 Dodge Stealth Indy 500 official car

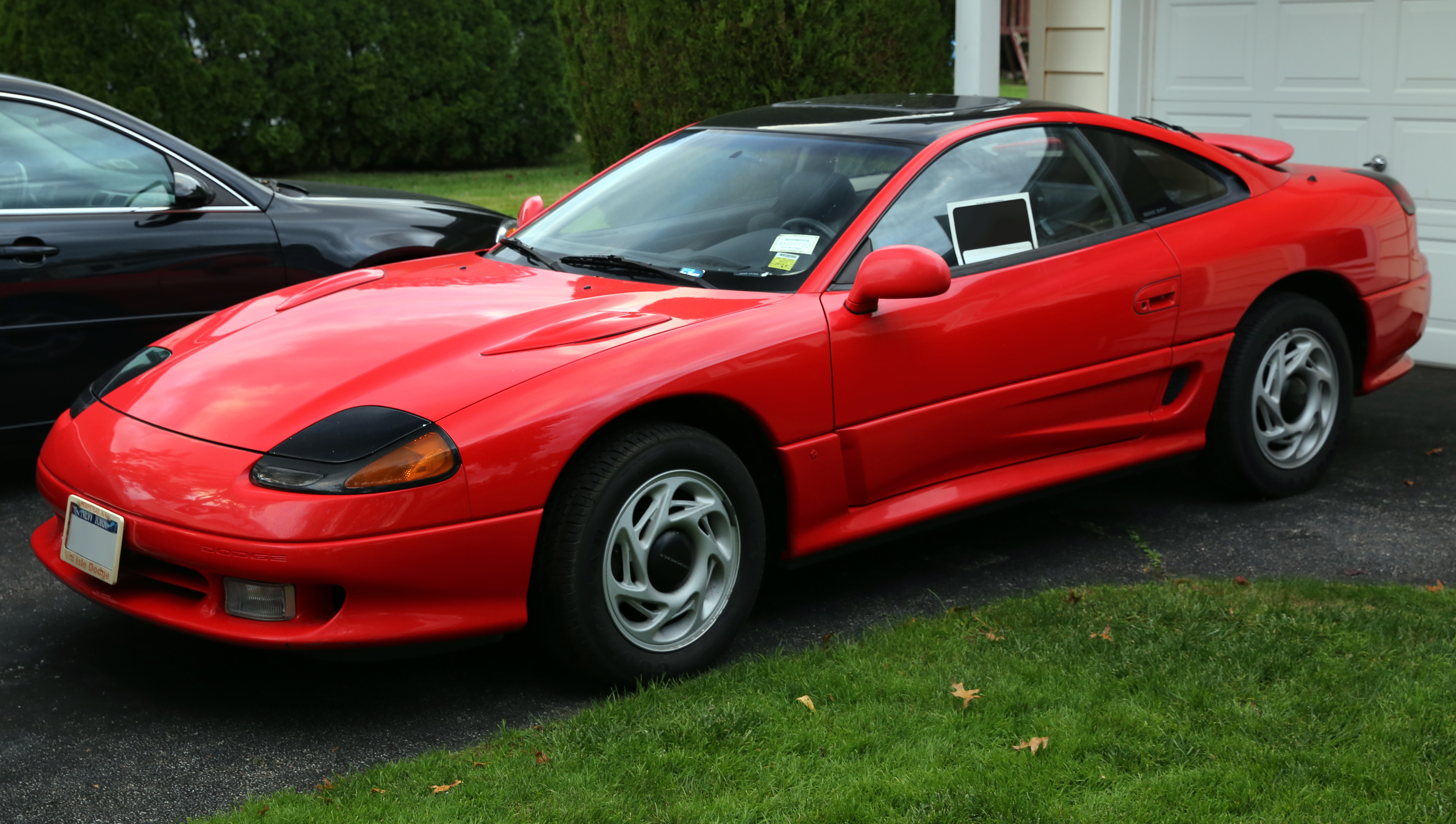
A 1991 Dodge Stealth R/T

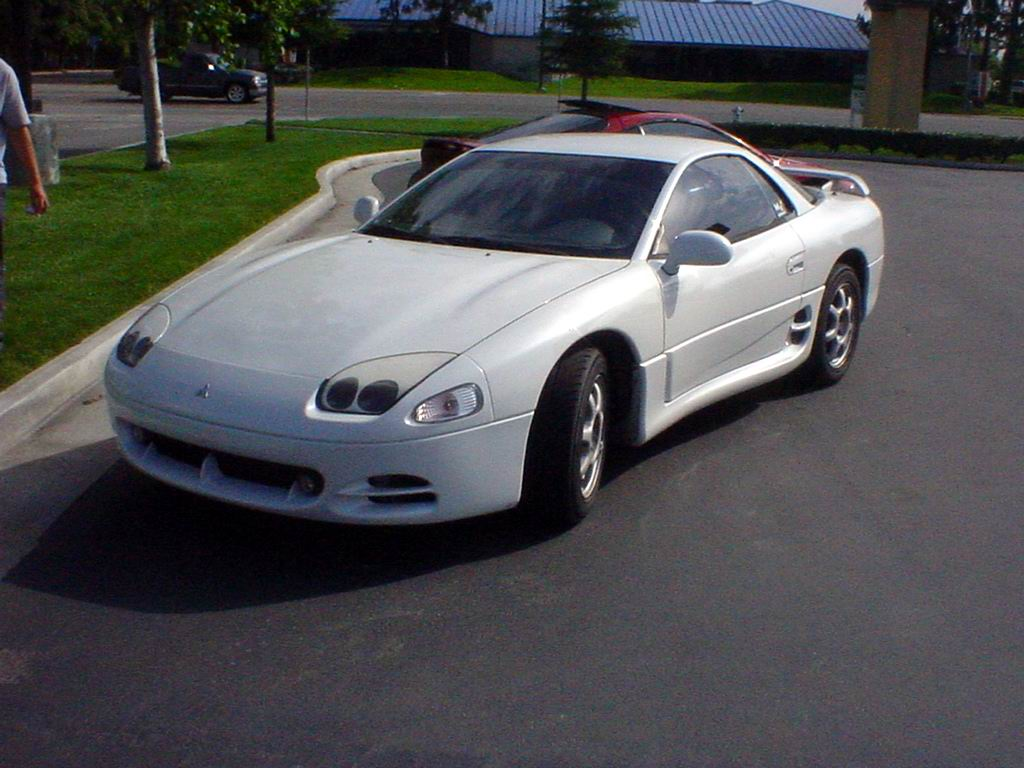
A 1995 base model 3000GT
