= Sauber (automobile) =

Former austrian car distributor

Sauber Automobilimport Handel GmbH
- Type: GmbH
- Industry: Automotive, import
- Founded: 1993
- Defunct: Unknown, possibly 1995
- Fate: Dissolved (not enough assets to pay for bankruptcy proceedings)

Sauber Automobilimport GmbH or Sauber was an automobile brand created for the Austrian market that sold rebadged American vehicles from Ford, General Motors and Dodge which were brought to Austria as grey market imports. Today, there are no cars legally registered with the Sauber badge, with the last registered car vanishing from records by 2019.

== Manufacturing ==
Sauber never manufactured any of the cars they offered, nor made an agreement with the car manufacturers to import and sell them in Austria. Instead, they created a branch based in Tampa, Florida called Sauber Automobiles USA, Inc., which would buy the models domestically from different dealerships and register them in the US before exporting them to Austria, where they would get modified to comply with the country's vehicle regulations.

The distribution of spare parts was handled by Beyschlag, a network of Opel dealerships based in Vienna. The vehicle owners were advised that if their car broke down abroad, they should seek out a Ford or Nissan servicing center for their familiarity with the original brands.

== Models ==
Sauber Villager (test unit)

Four models were offered to cater different segments; a hatchback, a compact car, a minivan and a sports car. All models were largely identical to their domestic counterparts apart from minor changes to the badges and wheel trims.

=== Teenager ===
The Teenager was a rebadge of the second generation Ford Aspire. Offered in two body styles; three-door and five-door hatchback. Powered by a 1.3-litre engine and equipped with driver and passenger airbags as standard.

=== Messager ===
The Messager is a rebadge of the Saturn S-Series. Like its domestic counterpart, it was offered in three body styles; a four-door sedan, a 5-door station wagon, and a 2-door coupe. Powered by either a 1.9-litre LK0 SOHC or a 1.9 litre LL0 DOHC engine producing 85 and 119 PS respectively. Both engines are paired with a five-speed manual transmission.

=== Villager ===
The Villager was a rebadge of the first-generation Mercury Villager which was offered with three trim levels; Villager V6, Villager V6 Business Class and Villager V6 First Class. All trim options are powered by a 3.0-litre Nissan VG30 V6 engine, producing 152 PS and paired with a 4-speed overdrive automatic transmission. Due to import laws, the American Villager's front lightbar had to be removed and was replaced with a plastic panel. The image above is a test unit before the lightbar was deemed illegal.

=== S1 24V Twin-Turbo ===
The S1 24V Twin-Turbo is a rebadge of the Series 2 Dodge Stealth R/T which on its own, is a rebadge of the Mitsubishi 3000GT. Powered by the 3.0-litre Mitsubishi 6G72 DOHC 24V V6 twin turbo engine, producing 320 PS.

== Sales ==
Sales Figures
Year	Yearly Total
1994	15
1995	8
1996	5
Total	28

Due to unreasonable pricing, low availability in the country and no demand for the American models, the Sauber brand sold poorly, with records showing no S1 models were ever sold.
