= Nissan KR engine =

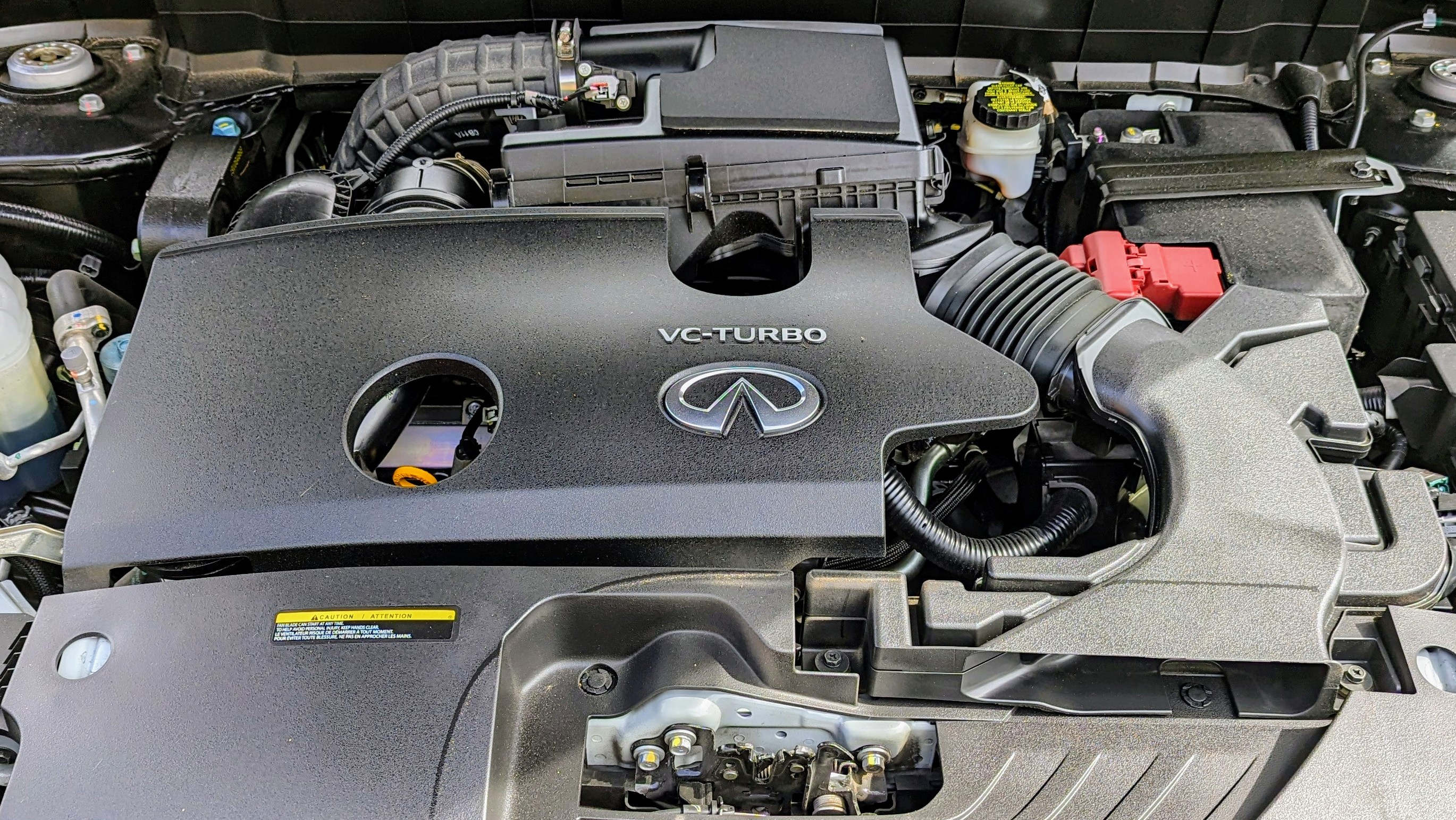
- KR20DDET engine in a 2020 Infiniti QX50

Overview
- Manufacturer: Nissan
- Production: 2018–present

Layout
- Configuration: I3 (KR15DDT and KH5T); I4 (KR20DDET)
- Displacement: 1,461 cc (1.5 L; 89.2 cu in) (KH5T); 1,497 cc (1.5 L; 91.4 cu in) (KR15DDT); 1,997 cc (2.0 L; 121.9 cu in) (KR20DDET)
- Cylinder bore: 84 mm (3.31 in)
- Piston stroke: 88.9 mm (3.50 in) (14.0:1 compression); 90.1 mm (3.55 in) (8.0:1 compression)
- Cylinder block material: Aluminum alloy
- Cylinder head material: Aluminum alloy
- Valvetrain: DOHC 4 valves per cylinder with VVT
- Compression ratio: 8.0:1–14.0:1

Combustion
- Turbocharger: Yes
- Fuel system: Direct-injection (GDI) (KR15DDT); Combined GDI and multi-point indirect injection (KR20DDET)
- Fuel type: Gasoline
- Cooling system: Water-cooled

Output
- Power output: 157 hp (159 PS; 117 kW) (KH5T); 201 hp (204 PS; 150 kW) (KR15DDT); 241–268 hp (244–272 PS; 180–200 kW) (KR20DDET)
- Torque output: 240 N⋅m (177 lb⋅ft) (KH5T); 305 N⋅m (225 lb⋅ft) (KR15DDT); 353–388 N⋅m (260–286 lb⋅ft) (KR20DDET)

Chronology
- Predecessor: QR25DE (KR15DDT) (I4); PR25DD (KR15DDT) (I4); VQ35DE (KR20DDET) (V6)

The Nissan KR engine family consists of three and four-cylinder all-aluminium turbocharged gasoline engines in both 12-valve and 16-valve versions with a variable compression ratio and variable valve timing developed by Nissan.

== KH5T ==
The KH5T is a 1.5 L (1461 cc) DIG-T (Direct Injection Gasoline-Turbocharged) inline-3 12-valve engine, with a bore x stroke of 79.7 mm × 81.1 mm (3.14 in × 3.19 in).. Power output is 160 PS (118 kW; 158 hp) and 240 N⋅m (177 lb⋅ft) of torque. The variation in compression ratio ranges between 8:1 and 14:1. This is achieved by the movement of an actuator which changes the length of the piston stroke according to the demand for power.

Applications:

- 2022–present Nissan Qashqai e-Power 190 PS (140 kW; 187 hp), 330 N⋅m (243 lb⋅ft)

== KR15DDT ==
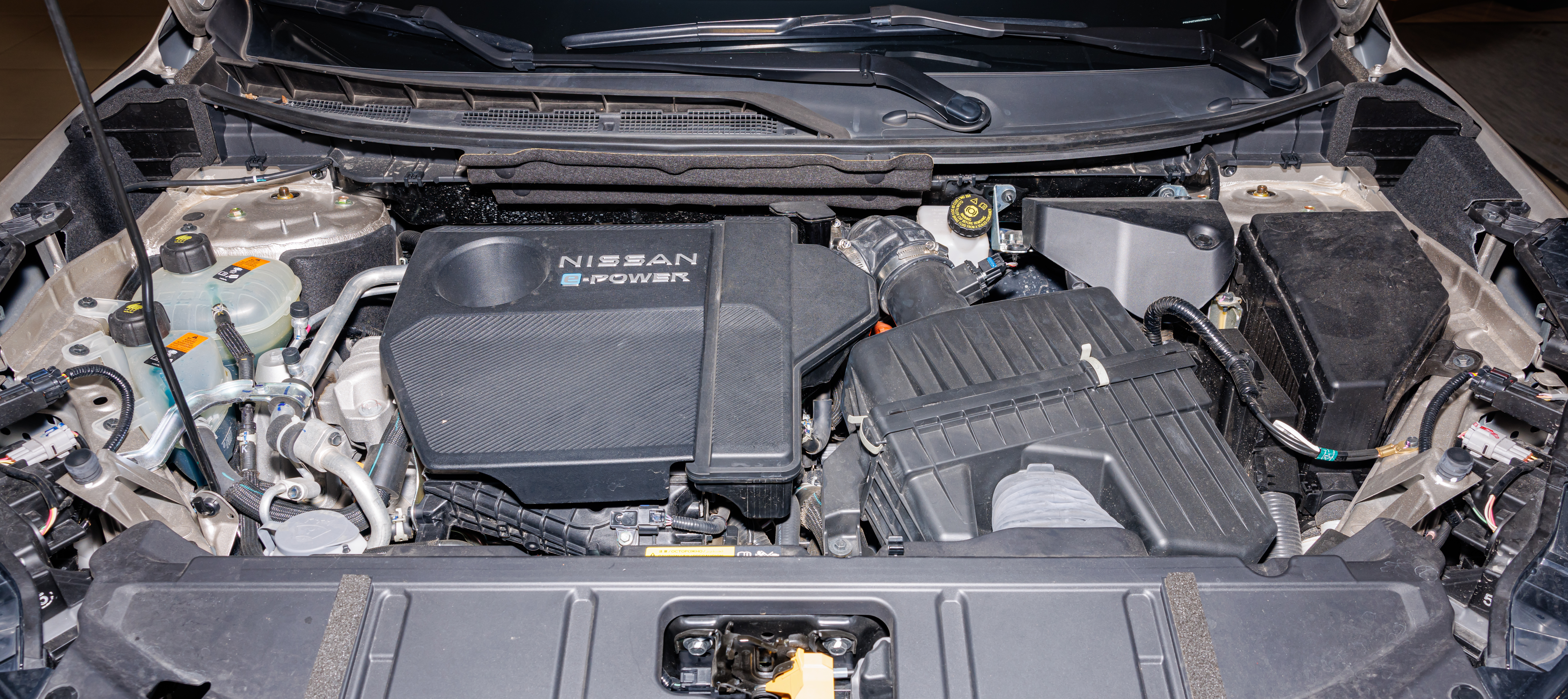
KR15DDT e-power engine in a Nissan X-Trail e-power (T33)

The KR15DDT VC-Turbo 3 cylinder engine was introduced in the fourth-generation X-Trail. The "VC" designation in the name indicates that the engine uses a variable compression ratio, allowing operating modes for both high power output and high fuel efficiency. The engine won Nissan its 19th trophy in the Wards 10 Best Engines and Propulsion systems awards of 2022; judge Drew Winter described it as “Very smooth, exceptionally quiet during idle, pleasant to drive in traffic or on the highway”, among other comments from judges such as “This engine inspires words that never have been uttered in the same sentence as 3-cylinder engine”.

Applications:

- 2021–present Nissan Rogue/X-Trail (T33) 201 hp (150 kW; 204 PS) @5600rpm, 225 lb⋅ft (305 N⋅m) @2800rpm
- 2026 Nissan Note Aura Nismo RS

== KR20DDET ==
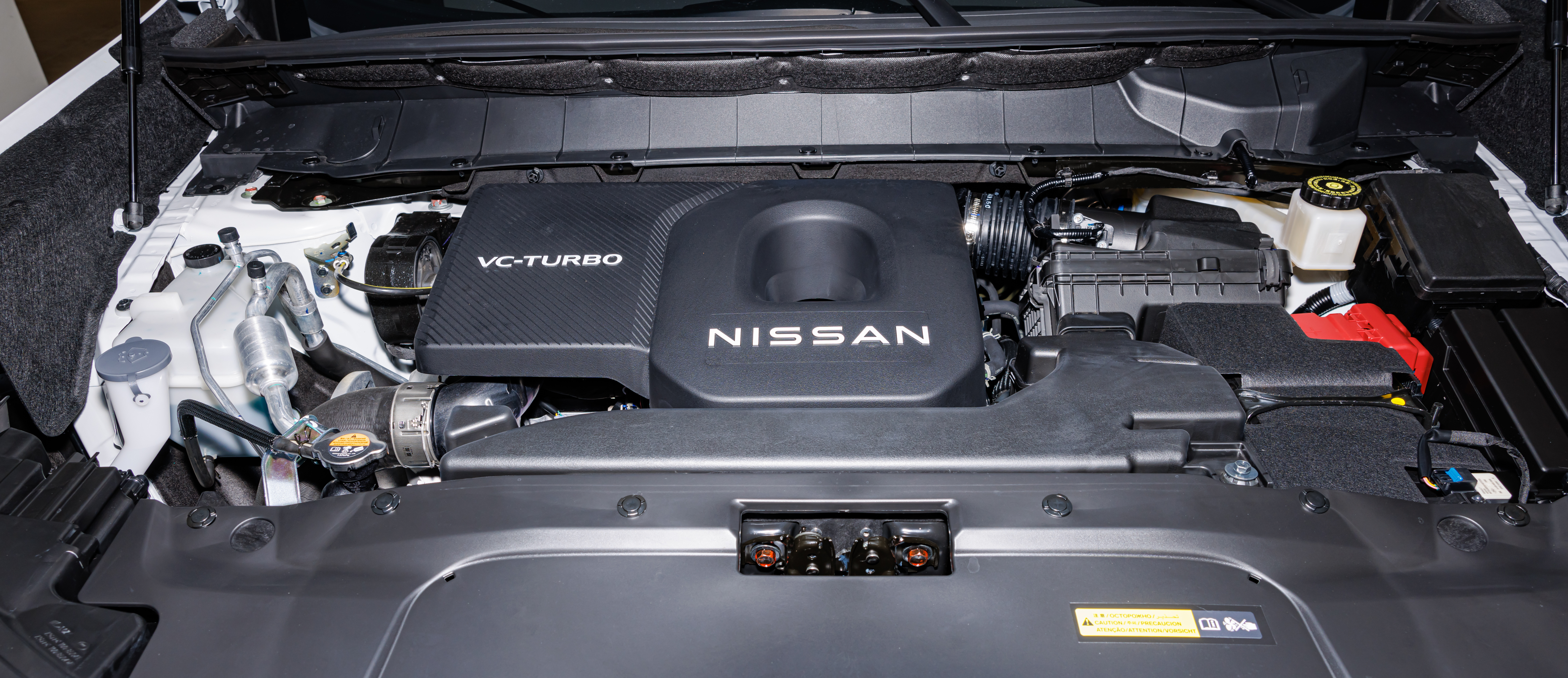
KR20DDET engine in a Nissan Pathfinder (R53) China Version

The KR20DDET was announced at the 2016 Paris Motor Show as the VC Turbo which had Nissan's new variable compression technology. The engine was introduced to Nissan's production cars in 2019 in the Infiniti QX50 and the Nissan Altima replacing the previous V6 options. It was touted as the world's first production-ready variable compression ratio engine.

Applications:

- 2017–2025 Infiniti QX50 (J55) 268 hp (200 kW; 272 PS) @5600rpm, 280 lb⋅ft (380 N⋅m) @4400rpm
- 2021–2025 Infiniti QX55 (J55) 268 hp (200 kW; 272 PS) @5600rpm, 280 lb⋅ft (380 N⋅m) @4400rpm
- 2022–present Infiniti QX60 (L51) 268 hp (200 kW; 272 PS), 286 lb⋅ft (388 N⋅m)
- 2023–present Nissan Pathfinder (R53) (China)
- 2019–2024 Nissan Altima (L34) 248 hp (185 kW; 251 PS) @5600rpm, 280 lb⋅ft (380 N⋅m) @1600rpm
- 2024–present Nissan Murano (Z53) 241 hp (180 kW; 244 PS), 260 lb⋅ft (353 N⋅m)
- 2025–present Nissan Teana Plus (China)
- 2026–present Infiniti QX65

== NHTSA investigation ==
On December 13, 2023, American agency NHTSA opened an investigation into customer complaints of engine failure in the Nissan's KR15DDT and KR20DDET engines, the former being used since the Nissan Rogue update in 2022. The complaints allege engine failure, loss of motive power, engine knock, or noise and/or metal chunks and shavings being found in the oil pan of vehicles with these engines. The cause appears to be seizures and damages to the main bearings and L-links. Nissan stated that they are attempting to address these failures by changing their manufacturing process.

== See also ==
- List of Nissan engines
