= Variable compression ratio =

Compression ratio adjustment technology

Variable compression ratio (VCR) is a technology to adjust the compression ratio of an internal combustion engine while the engine is in operation. This is done to increase fuel efficiency while under varying loads. Variable compression engines allow the volume above the piston at top dead centre to be changed. Higher loads require lower ratios to increase power, while lower loads need higher ratios to increase efficiency, i.e. to lower fuel consumption. For automotive use this needs to be done as the engine is running in response to the load and driving demands. The 2019 Infiniti QX50 is the first commercially available vehicle that uses a variable compression ratio engine.

== Advantages ==
Gasoline engines have a limit on the maximum pressure during the compression stroke, after which the fuel/air mixture detonates rather than burns. To achieve higher power outputs at the same speed, more fuel must be burned and therefore more air is needed. To achieve this, turbochargers or superchargers are used to increase the inlet pressure. This would result in detonation of the fuel/air mixture unless the compression ratio was decreased, i.e. the volume above the piston made greater. This can be done to a greater or lesser extent with massive increases in power being possible. The down side of this is that under light loading, the engine can lack power and torque. The solution is to be able to vary the inlet pressure and adjust the compression ratio to suit. This gives the best of both worlds, a small efficient engine capable of great power on demand. In addition, VCR allows free use of different fuels besides petrol e.g. LPG or ethanol.

Cylinder displacement is altered by using a hydraulic system connected to the crankshaft, and adjusted according to the load and acceleration required.

== Production ==
Variable compression engines have existed for decades but only in laboratories for the purposes of studying combustion processes. These designs usually have a second adjustable piston set in the head opposing the working piston.

In 2018 Infiniti began production of their variable compression turbo engine, which uses a mechanical linkage to achieve the variability. It was installed in their QX50 SUV. The engine can produce any compression ratio from 8:1 to 14:1. The highest torque is achieved at 8:1, giving high acceleration, while the best gas mileage (fuel efficiency) is achieved at 14:1. The electronic engine controller responds to the pressure on the gas pedal, in real-time, altering the compression ratio seamlessly. Although this engine has a displacement of 2.0 L, and is an inline-four engine, it does not use balance shafts to eliminate the secondary vibrations. It is inherently balanced by the mechanical linkage.

== Two-stroke engines ==
Due to the comparative simplicity of cylinder head design (lacking intake valves) it is somewhat easier to implement in two-stroke engines. From the late 90s on up models which expand on this idea have been available, such as from Yamaha, which dynamically vary the size of the combustion chamber. As of late (in the 2000s) this technology has seen some renewed interest, due it being able to burn a wide range of fuels (e.g. including alcohols) such as the Lotus Omnivore.

A much earlier commercialized two-stroke engine, but very small (18 cc) and not powerful enough to be very successful, was the Lohmann engine produced in the early 1950s as a retrofit engine for bicycles . This engine had a one-piece cylinder head and sleeve, whose distance from the crankshaft was adjusted by a jackscrew operated by cables from a twist grip on the handlebar. Compression adjustment was essential to the operation of this engine because it used compression ignition of a fuel mixture which was introduced prior to the compression stroke and which therefore ignited whenever the compression brought it to a sufficient temperature. This meant that the compression needed would vary with air temperature, engine temperature, and fuel type: with too much compression the engine would suffer premature ignition and with too little it would fail to ignite at all. Thus the operator had to adjust the compression continually as operating conditions varied. The Lohmann engine was produced for only about five years because the control of compression (simultaneously with fuel flow) required considerable practice, and because even at optimal adjustment it provided no more power than a moderately fit rider could provide without assistance.

== Engine designs ==
The first VCR engine built and tested was by Harry Ricardo in the 1920s. This work led to him devising the octane rating system that is still in use today. Many companies have been undertaking their own research into VCR Engines, including Saab, Nissan, Volvo, PSA/Peugeot-Citroën and Renault. The 2019 Infiniti QX50 is available with a production version of the turbocharged variable compression engine.

=== Peugeot MCE-5 ===
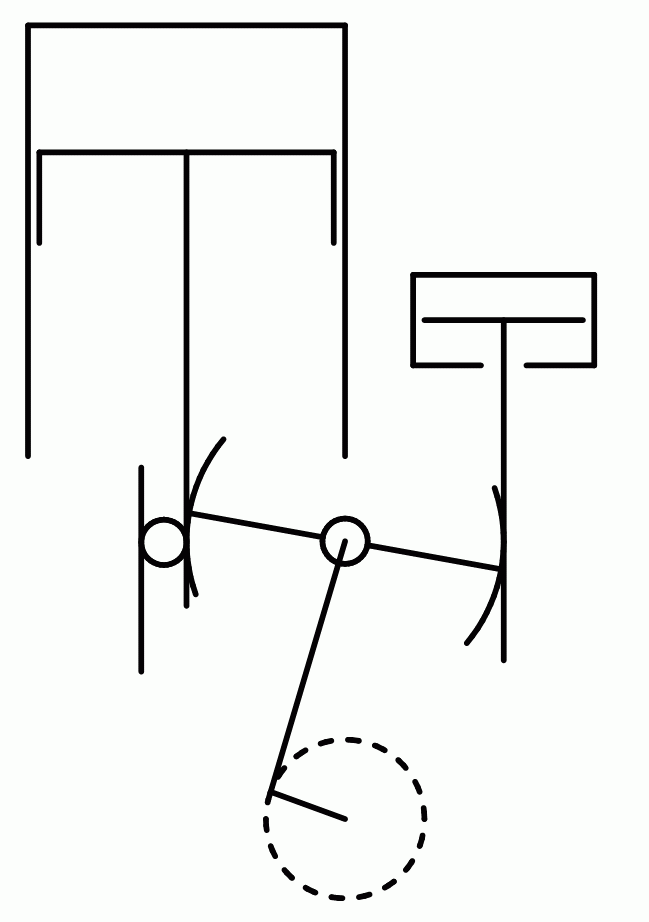
Principle of the MCE-5 ("Multi Cycle Engine - 5 parameters"), the variable compression ratio engine made by Peugeot.

The Peugeot design works by varying the effective length of the con-rods connecting the piston to the crank. When the con-rod is shorter, the compression ratio is lower and vice versa. On the left hand-side of the diagram is the conventional piston of an internal combustion engine. On the right is an hydraulic cylinder with double-acting piston. This acts through a rod-crank system with a gear wheel, whose movement adjusts the effective con-rod length and thus the compression ratio in the left cylinder.

=== Saab SVC ===
SAAB Automobile rekindled interest in variable compression when they introduced their SVC engine to the world at the Geneva motor show in 2000. SAAB had been involved in working with the 'Office of Advanced Automotive Technologies', to produce a modern petrol VCR engine that showed an efficiency comparable with that of a Diesel. The SAAB SVC was an advanced and workable addition to the world of VCR engines, but it never reached production due to the company's bankruptcy in 2016.

The design, an implementation of the Larsen VCR engine, consisted of a monobloc head, which contained all of the valve gear, and the crankshaft/crankcase assembly. These parts were connected by a pivot which allowed 4 degrees of movement controlled by a hydraulic actuator. This mechanism allows the distance between the crankshaft centre line and the cylinder crown to be varied. Unlike the Peugeot design, the effective connecting rod length is fixed. A supercharger was chosen in preference to a turbocharger to achieve the necessary response time and high boost pressure.

To alter V_{c}, the SVC 'lowers' the cylinder head closer to the crankshaft. It does this by replacing the typical one-part engine block with a two-part unit, with the crankshaft in the lower block and the cylinders in the upper portion. The two blocks are hinged together at one side (imagine a book, lying flat on a table, with the front cover held an inch or so above the title page). By pivoting the upper block around the hinge point, the V_{c} (imagine the air between the front cover of the book and the title page) can be modified. In practice, the SVC adjusts the upper block through a small range of motion, using a hydraulic actuator.

== See also ==
- Continuously variable transmission
- DiesOtto
- Miller cycle
- Variable valve timing
