= Infiniti QX70 =

Mid-size luxury crossover SUV produced by Nissan

Infiniti FX/QX70
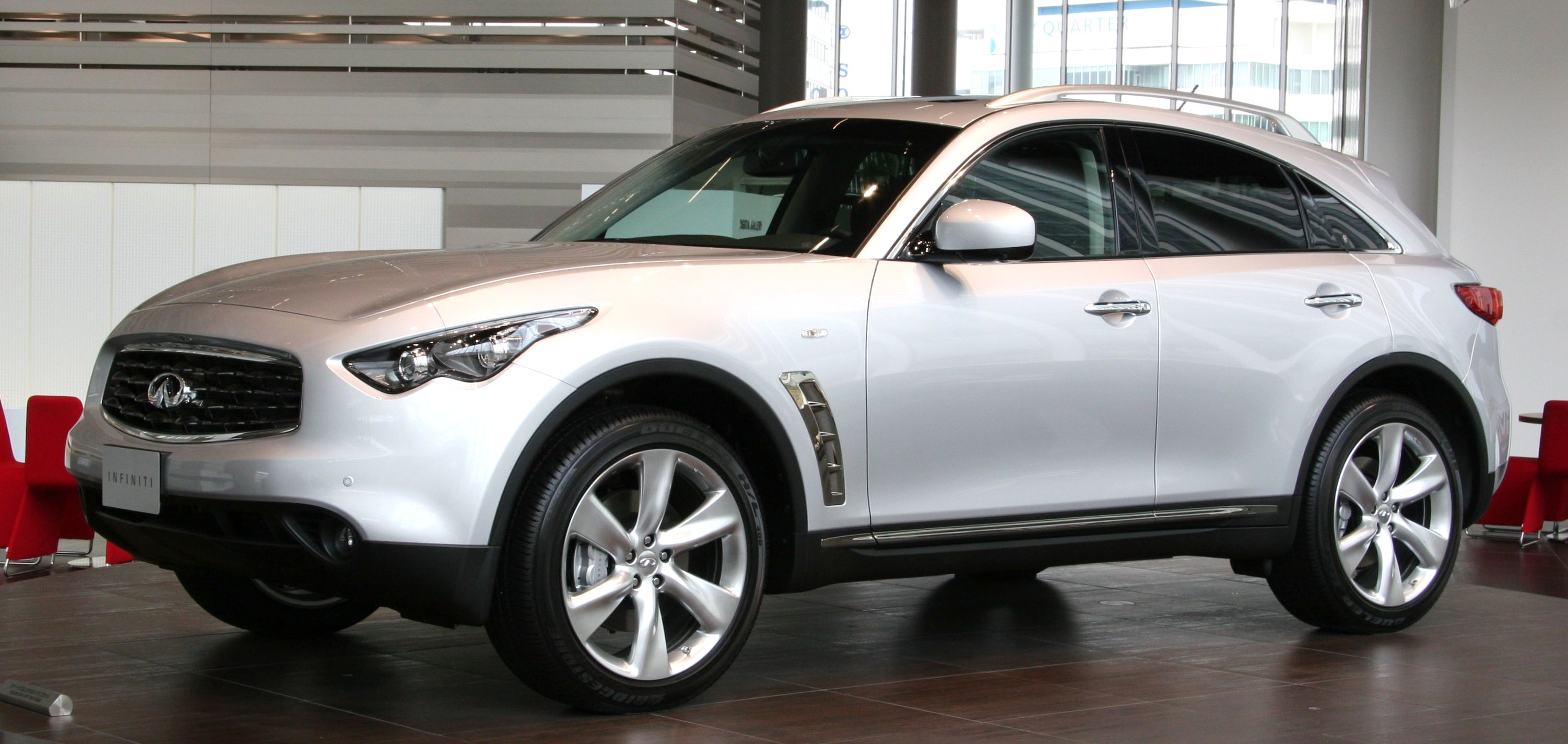
- Infiniti FX50S (S51)

Overview
- Manufacturer: Nissan
- Also called: Infiniti FX (2002–2013)
- Production: 2002–2013 (FX); 2013–2019 (QX70)
- Model years: 2003–2017

Body and chassis
- Class: Mid-size luxury crossover SUV
- Body style: 5-door SUV
- Layout: Front-engine, rear-wheel-drive Front-engine, four-wheel-drive
- Platform: Nissan FM platform

Chronology
- Predecessor: Infiniti QX4
- Successor: Infiniti QX65

The Infiniti QX70, formerly the Infiniti FX until 2013, is a mid-size luxury crossover SUV marketed by Infiniti, Nissan's luxury division between 2002 and 2019 over two generations. The model replaced the QX4 as Infiniti's mid-size SUV. The model does not have a Nissan-branded equivalent, and was never sold in Japan.

== First generation (S50; 2002) ==
First generation
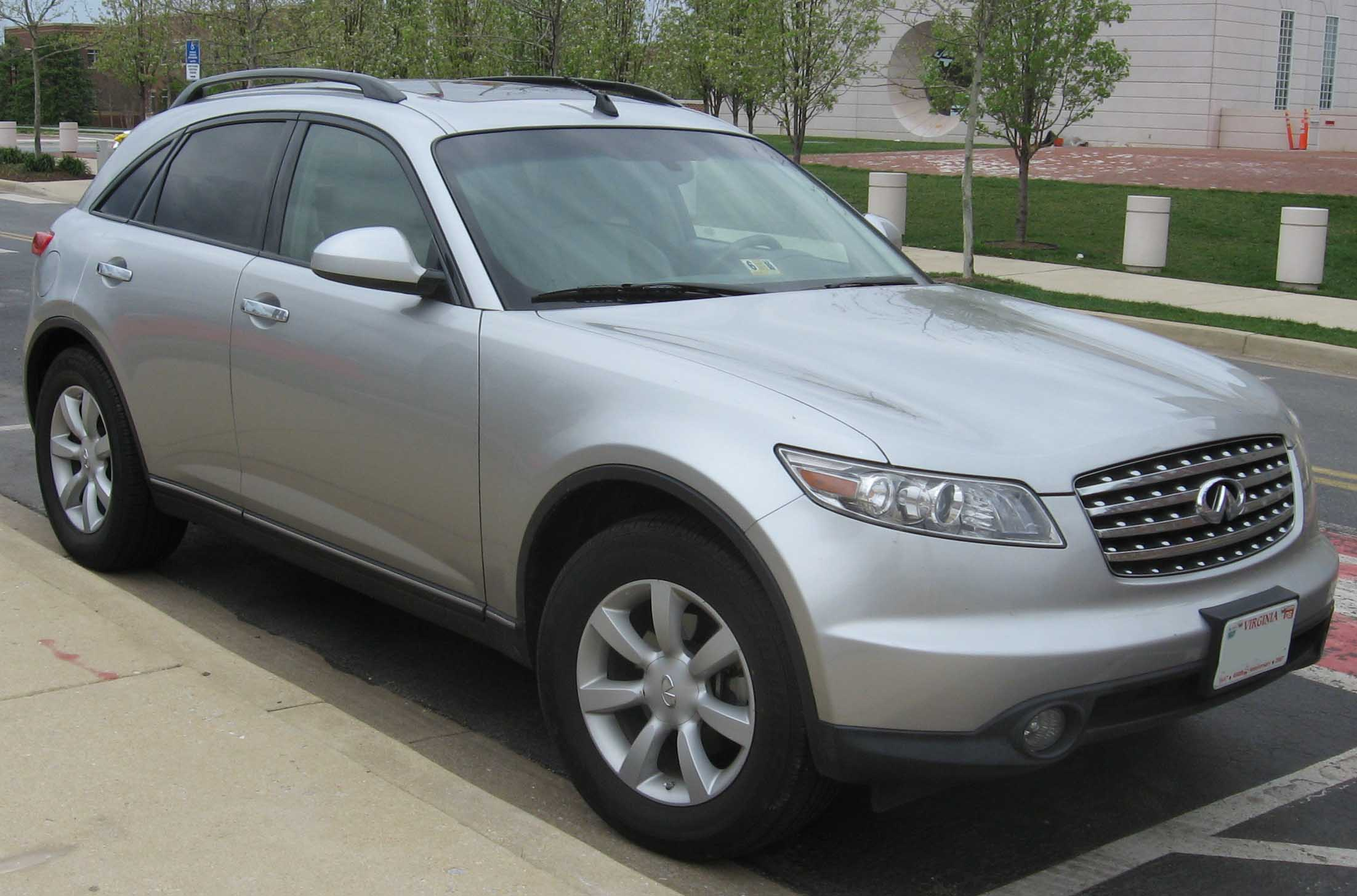

Overview
- Model code: S50
- Production: November 2002 – February 2008
- Model years: 2003–2008
- Assembly: Japan: Hiratsuka, Kanagawa
- Designer: Mamoru Aoki

Body and chassis
- Related: Infiniti G35/G37; Infiniti M Infiniti EX; Nissan 350Z; Nissan Skyline

Powertrain
- Engine: Gasoline: 3.5 L VQ35DE V6; 4.5 L VK45DE V8
- Transmission: 5-speed RE5R05A automatic

Dimensions
- Wheelbase: 112.2 in (2,850 mm)
- Length: 189.1 in (4,803 mm)
- Width: 75.8 in (1,925 mm)
- Height: 2003–05: 65.0 in (1,651 mm); 2006–08: 65.9 in (1,674 mm)

The nameplates FX35 and FX45 refer to the two available engines. The FX35 is available in two drivetrains, the RWD and the AWD, which are both fitted to a dual overhead cam 3.5-liter 24-valve V6 VQ35DE gasoline engine, with aluminum-alloy block and heads, electronically controlled throttle system, and low-friction molybdenum-coated pistons that makes use of the continuous variable valve timing which in part optimizes the opening of intake valves. This is also coupled with an electronically controlled super-wide ratio five-speed automatic with a manumatic shift mode that includes the option of sequentially selected manual gearshifts and downshift rev-matching.

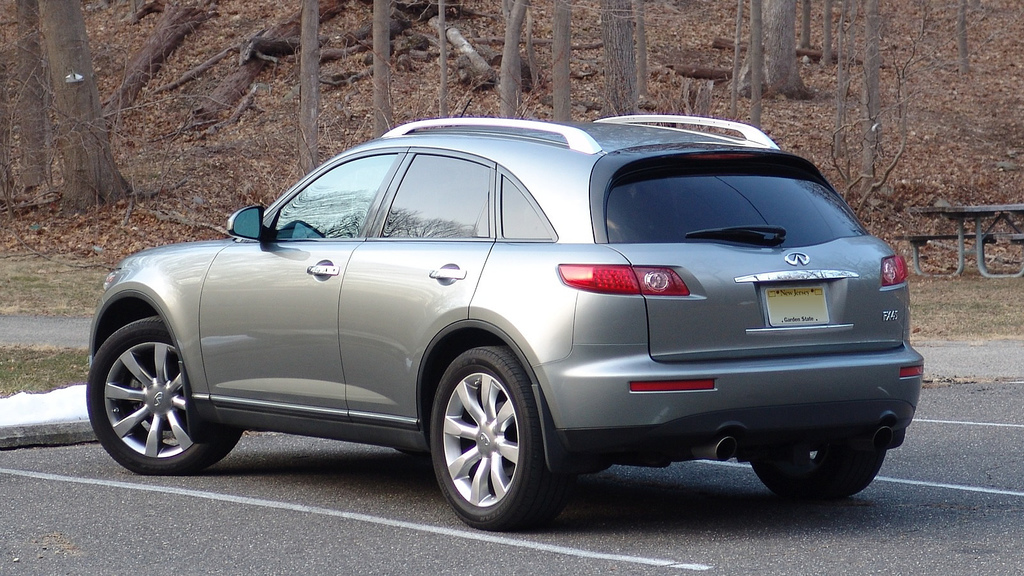
Infiniti FX45 (US)

The AWD FX45 incorporates a 4.5 L (4,494 cc) 32-valve V8 DOHC VK45DE gasoline engine with four valves per cylinder, microfinished camshafts with aluminum-alloy block and heads, low-friction molybdenum-coated pistons, titanium intake and exhaust valves, modular cylinder heads, microfinished crankshaft, lightweight pistons, super-silent single stage cam drive chain, and a Continuously Variable Valve Timing Control System that optimizes opening of intake valves. Development began in 1999 under newly appointed CEO Carlos Ghosn's Nissan Revival Plan (NRP). Design work was completed in rapid succession in 2000, for late 2002 production. Designed prior to that, earlier on in 2000 under the "Bionic Cheetah" theme, the 2001 Infiniti FX45 Concept was introduced at the NAIAS in January 2001. From mid-2001, a new concept based on the production design was developed and completed in late 2001. Sketches were first released in late November 2001. The second-generation 2002 FX45 Concept was introduced in January 2002 at the NAIAS as a thinly-veiled production FX (S50) and planned production was announced for early 2003. In January 2003, the 2003 FX45 made its debut at the NAIAS and went on sale January 24, 2003.

In 2003 for the 2004 model, changes were the addition of a standard eight-way power front passenger seat that replaced the previous four-way design, the availability of aluminum roof rails and chrome-plated 20-inch wheels. Also new were a dark silver metallic finish for the 20-inch wheels (non-chrome-plated), the addition of a standard HVAC filter for all models and the addition of a new Snow-Mode function.

In September 2004 for the 2005 model year, the FX range received enhancements such as a lane departure warning (LDW) system that helps alert drivers to an unintended movement of the vehicle out of a designated traffic lane. Infiniti's system monitored the lane markings to alert passengers via an audible buzzer that the driver is drifting unintentionally. The LDW system utilizes a small camera, speed sensor, an indicator, and an audible warning buzzer. The 2005 FX was the first passenger vehicle to offer a lane departure warning system in the United States market. In addition to LDW, the 2005 FX range was now equipped with standard roof-mounted curtain supplemental curtain airbags with rollover protection for front and rear outboard seat occupants.

Other changes included the addition of a dark chrome grille, headlight, and clear taillight accents to the FX45 (also available as part of the V6 Sport Package on FX35 models), a new key fob design for the Infiniti Intelligent Key system, and two new exterior colors, Sapphire and Sheer Platinum. Interior changes included a new standard etched aluminum trim.

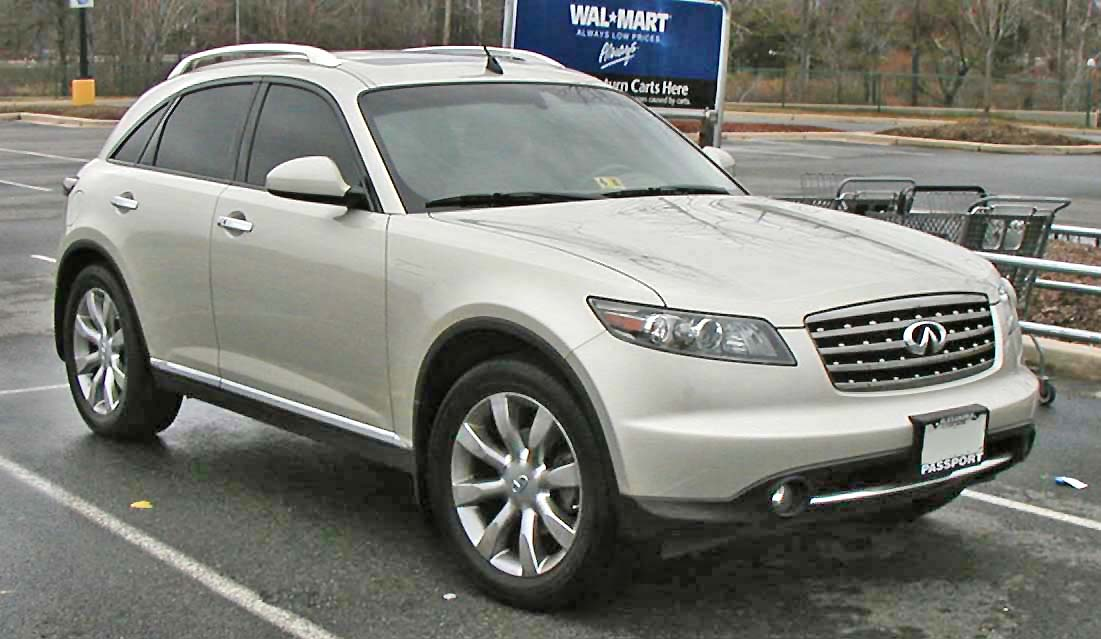
2006 Infiniti FX

The FX series was updated for the 2006 model year with new options and standard features. The updates included an exterior facelift with a new grille, bumper, wheel design, and three new exterior colors, and inside a revised center console with a new color screen. Many previously optional features were made standard, including the 300-watt Bose audio system, RearView Monitor, 7-inch color display, Advanced Air Bag System (AABS), leather seating surfaces with heated front seats, ten-way power driver's seat with power lumbar support and eight-way power passenger's seat.

The FX45 featured additional upgrades, including new 20-inch wheels, leather seats, a revised sport-tuned four-wheel independent suspension with new dampers, a Bluetooth system, and the Premium Package became standard. Sales began in January 2006, after production commenced in November 2005. Production of the first generation FX ended in February 2008.

Performance

FX35:

- 0-60 mph (97 km/h): 7.1 seconds
- 0-100 mph (160 km/h): 17.5 seconds
- 1/4 mile: 15.3 seconds at 91.0 mph (146.5 km/h)
- 200 ft (61 m) Skidpad: 0.79 g
- Top speed: 143 mph (230 km/h) (drag limited)

FX45:

- 0-60 mph (97 km/h): 6.1 seconds
- 0-100 mph (160 km/h): 16.5 seconds
- 1/4 mile: 14.6 seconds at 96.1 mph (154.7 km/h)
- 200 ft (61 m) Skidpad: 0.82 g
- Top speed: 149 mph (240 km/h) (electronically limited)

Total 2007 sales of the FX45 were 1,598 units, about a tenth of the FX35s.

== Second generation (S51; 2008) ==
Second generation
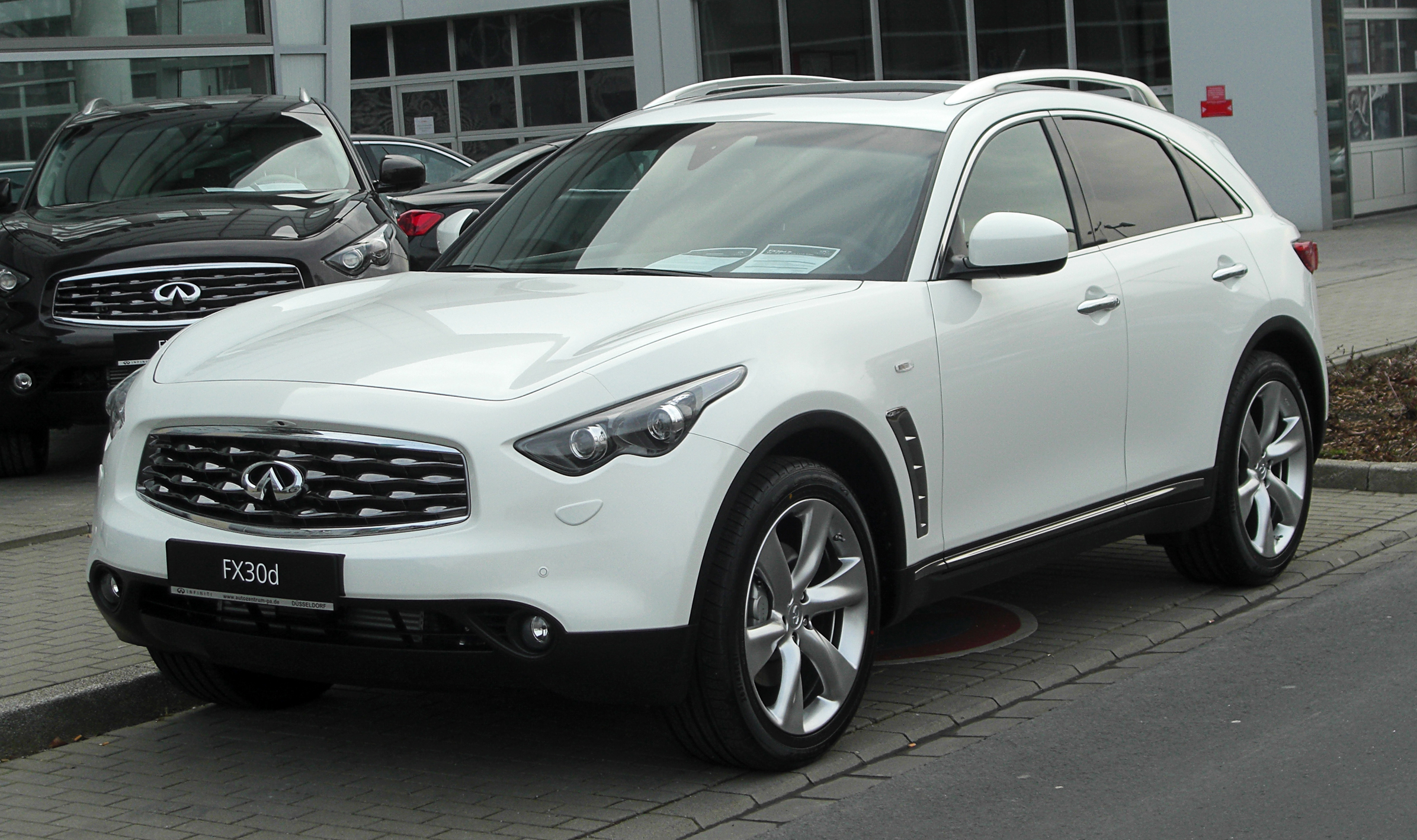

Overview
- Model code: S51
- Also called: Infiniti QX70 (2013-2019)
- Production: March 2008 – March 2013 (FX); April 2013 – 2019 (QX70)
- Model years: 2009–2017
- Assembly: Japan: Kaminokawa, Tochigi (Nissan Tochigi Plant); Russia: Saint-Petersburg (2012-2014)
- Designer: Mamoru Aoki

Body and chassis
- Related: Infiniti G Infiniti M Infiniti EX; Nissan 370Z

Powertrain
- Engine: Gasoline: 3.5 L VQ35HR V6; 3.7 L VQ37VHR V6; 5.0 L VK50VE V8; Diesel: 3.0 L V9X V6 turbo
- Transmission: 7-speed RE7R01A automatic (3.5, 3.7); 7-speed RE7R01B automatic (5.0, 3.0d)

Dimensions
- Wheelbase: 113.6 in (2,885 mm)
- Length: 2009–2011: 191.1 in (4,854 mm); 2012–2019: 191.3 in (4,859 mm)
- Width: 79.9 in (2,029 mm)
- Height: 66.1 in (1,679 mm); 2012–2017 FX35: 65.0 in (1,651 mm)

The FX introduced its second generation for the 2009 model year as the FX35 and FX50.

=== FX35, FX50 ===
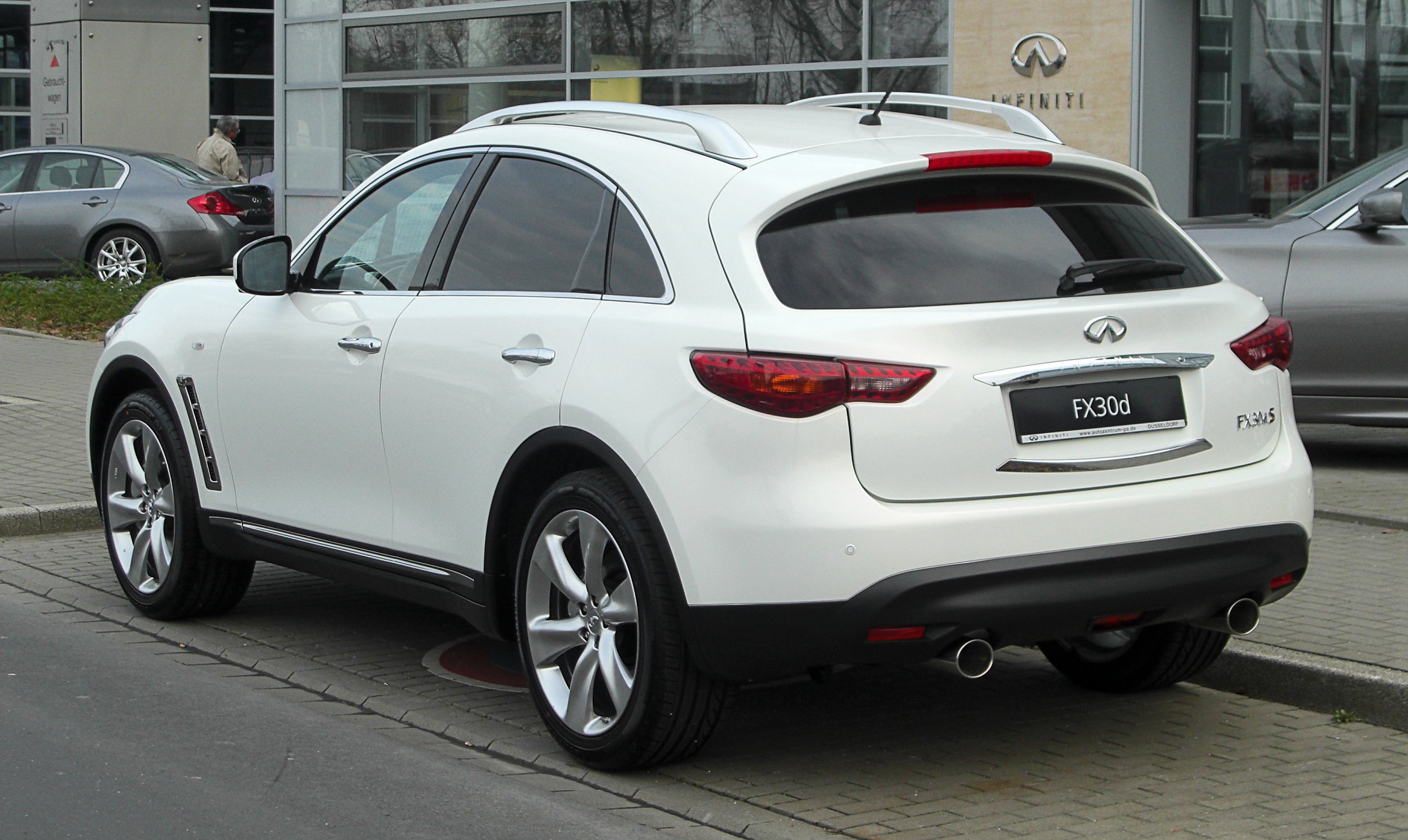
FX30d S (Germany; pre-facelift)

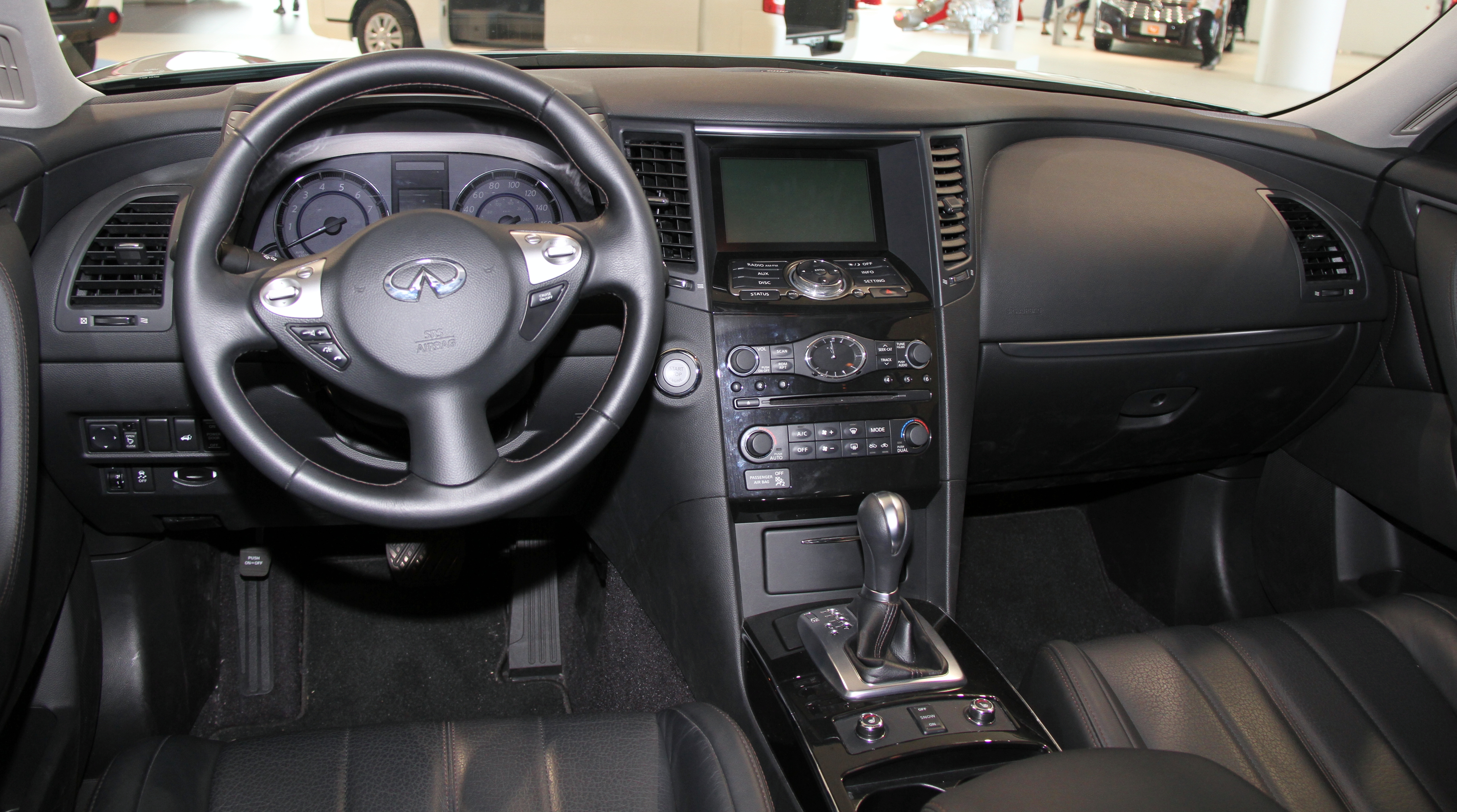
Interior

The redesigned 2009 Infiniti FX was officially unveiled at the Geneva Motor Show on March 4, 2008, and went on sale in June 2008. The V6 model was still called FX35 with the VQ35HR V6, but the V8 model was renamed FX50 in recognition of its 5-liter engine, the newly developed VK50VE.

The exterior retained some of the first generation's "Bionic Cheetah" look and "giant scarab" profile while incorporating new styling cues. Features of the new design included longer, shark-like sculpted headlights, a large trapezoidal grille filled with horizontal dark-chrome waves, and functional side air vents. The overall size and dimensions of the new model, both external and internal, remained similar to the previous model.

The interior was completely redesigned to bring the FX up to the level of luxury found inside of other Infiniti models like the G37 and EX35. Features included stitched leather seats, stained maple wood or piano black finishes, and matte-finish surfaces.

Front suspension was a new double-wishbone design, similar to that found on the G37 and EX35; this replaced the previous generation FX's front strut-type suspension. The suspension's upper and lower A-arms were designed to improve control of a wheel's motion, especially when the suspension compresses and extends, providing more travel than the previous strut design. The body was also designed to be 1.6 times more torsionally rigid and 3.4 times more resistant to bending than the previous model. All Wheel Drive (AWD) was standard, and notably, Infiniti's AWD system always engages a 50:50 power split when stationary, ensuring maximum off-the-line traction at all times. Up to 100 percent of the engine's power can be sent to the rear wheels when needed, with a maximum of 50 percent available to the front.

==== European models (FX37, FX30d) ====
A Europe-specific FX37 was unveiled at the 2008 Paris Motor Show and went on sale in Europe in October 2008 with the VQ37VHR. Europeans get the 325 hp (242 kW) FX37 as their entry-level model instead of the FX35, which will be available in FX37 GT and FX37S versions. The FX37 GT came equipped with 20-inch alloy wheels, power and heated/ventilated front seats, adaptive xenon headlamps, parking camera sensors, all-wheel-drive, and a 7-speed automatic with paddle shifting. The FX37S added 21-inch alloy wheels, Continuous Damping Control, and sports seats.

The Europe-specific FX30d was released in late 2010, powered by a new 3.0-liter V6 turbodiesel V9X engine. The engine was developed by the Renault-Nissan Alliance, and will also power the EX and M models.

This engine is the first diesel in Infiniti's history, and was designed to deliver high levels of refined performance. Although a V8 diesel engine was entertained, the V6 format was selected early on as the ideal layout for the unit, as Infiniti felt it provided the optimum balance between overall performance and refinement.

The engine produces a total of 240 PS (177 kW) and 406 lb⋅ft (550 N⋅m) of torque. Peak torque can be achieved from as low as 1,750 rpm and is available to 2,500 rpm, while up to 370 lb⋅ft (502 N⋅m) is available from 1,500 rpm. Idle speed is an exceptionally low 650 rpm with less noise, vibration, and harshness (NVH) than most diesels.

==== Equipment ====
Standard comfort features include dual-zone automatic climate control, a premium 11-speaker, 300 watt Bose stereo with in-dash 6 CD changer and 2GB hard drive, steering wheel mounted audio controls, premium leather seating surfaces, heated front bucket seats, heated power mirrors, 10-way power driver seat w/ lumbar adjustment, 8-way power passenger seat, individual driver memory system (driver's seat, side mirrors, and steering wheel positions), RearView back-up camera, UV reflective glass, and Infiniti's Intelligent Key system. The Intelligent Key design from the first generation FX now incorporates a Push Button Ignition system. With this system, the driver does not have to remove keys to drive the vehicle; a simple electronic fob carried on the driver allows the driver to lock/unlock and start the vehicle keyless.

Other standard features include Scratch Shield paint (first introduced on the Infiniti EX), black lacquer interior trim, high-intensity discharge (HID) headlamps, LED brake lamps, 12-point sequential welcome lighting, electronic liftgate closure assist, automatic dimming rear-view mirror with compass, glass moonroof, rear privacy glass, integrated rear spoiler, and dual chrome exhaust tips.

Standard safety features include dual front airbags, side-impact airbags, and rear curtain airbags with rollover sensors, as well as Zone Body construction with front and rear crumple zones.

Options include Infiniti's Hard Drive Navigation with touch screen and 3D building images, All-Around View Monitor (first introduced on the Infiniti EX) which displays a virtual bird's-eye view of the vehicle and surroundings to aid in parking, and Intelligent Cruise Control, which provides the benefits of standard cruise control with the ability to add speed and distance intervals, as well as automatically slowing the vehicle in slowing traffic to help provide a safe distance. When traffic flow ahead speeds up, Intelligent Cruise Control then reaccelerates to the preset speed and distance settings. Optional industry-first Distance Control Assist intuitively helps the driver release the throttle and apply the brakes as needed in slowing traffic. Another option, Forward Collision Warning uses the Intelligent Cruise system's laser rangefinder to alert the driver of a potential collision, and if the driver does not respond, Brake Assist automatically engages the brakes to help reduce collision speed and impact. The Premium Package adds heated and cooled front seats, a power-adjustable steering wheel, iPod integration system, folding outdoor mirrors, and aluminum paddle shifters to adjust the gears when using the manual shift mode.

==== Transmission and drivetrain ====
All 2009 FX models came standard with Infiniti's new 7-speed automatic transmission, which was also introduced on the 2009 G37 coupe.

The FX35 (U.S.) is available in both rear-wheel drive or all-wheel drive configuration, while the FX35 (Canada), FX37 (Europe), and FX50 (all) come standard with all-wheel drive. The FX uses Nissan's ATTESA E-TS all-wheel drive system.

All FX50 models ordered with the Sport package (FX50S) come equipped with Active Steering package. This package features a planetary gearset on the steering shaft (similar to BMW), that varies the steering ratio between 12.0:1 and 18.5:1. The package also includes a rear-wheel steering system that induces up to one degree of steer to the rear wheels, to provide increased handling response for the vehicle.

Gasoline engines
Model	Years	Type/code	Power, torque/rpm
FX35	2009-2012	3,498 cc (213.5 cu in) V6 (VQ35HR)	303 hp (226 kW; 307 PS) at 6800, 36.2 kg⋅m (355 N⋅m; 262 lbf⋅ft) at 4800
FX37	2013	3,696 cc (225.5 cu in) V6 (VQ37VHR)	325 hp (242 kW; 330 PS) at 7000, 36.9 kg⋅m (362 N⋅m; 267 lbf⋅ft) at 5200
FX50	2009-2013	5,026 cc (306.7 cu in) V8 (VK50VE)	390 hp (291 kW; 395 PS) at 6500, 51.0 kg⋅m (500 N⋅m; 369 lbf⋅ft) at 4400

diesel engines
Model	Years	Type/code	Power, torque/rpm
FX30d	2010–2013	2,993 cc (182.6 cu in) V6 (V9X)	240 hp (179 kW; 243 PS) at 3750, 56.1 kg⋅m (550 N⋅m; 406 lbf⋅ft) at 1750

==== Performance ====
FX35:

- 0-60 mph (97 km/h): 6.1 seconds
- 0-100 mph (161 km/h): 15.7
- 1/4 mile: 14.9 seconds at 96.0 mph (154.5 km/h)
- 300 ft (91 m) Skidpad: .82g
- Top Speed: 155 mph (249 km/h) (governed limited)

FX37 (Europe):

- 0-62 mph (100 km/h): 5.8 seconds
- 1/4 mile: 14.6 seconds at 97.5 mph (156.9 km/h)
- Top Speed: 155 mph (249 km/h) (drag limited)

FX50:

- 0-60 mph (97 km/h): 5.2 seconds
- 0-100 mph (161 km/h): 12.6 seconds
- 1/4 mile: 13.7 seconds at 102.1 mph (164.3 km/h)
- 200 ft (61 m) Skidpad: .87g
- Top Speed: 165 mph (266 km/h) (electronically limited)

==== 2011 update ====
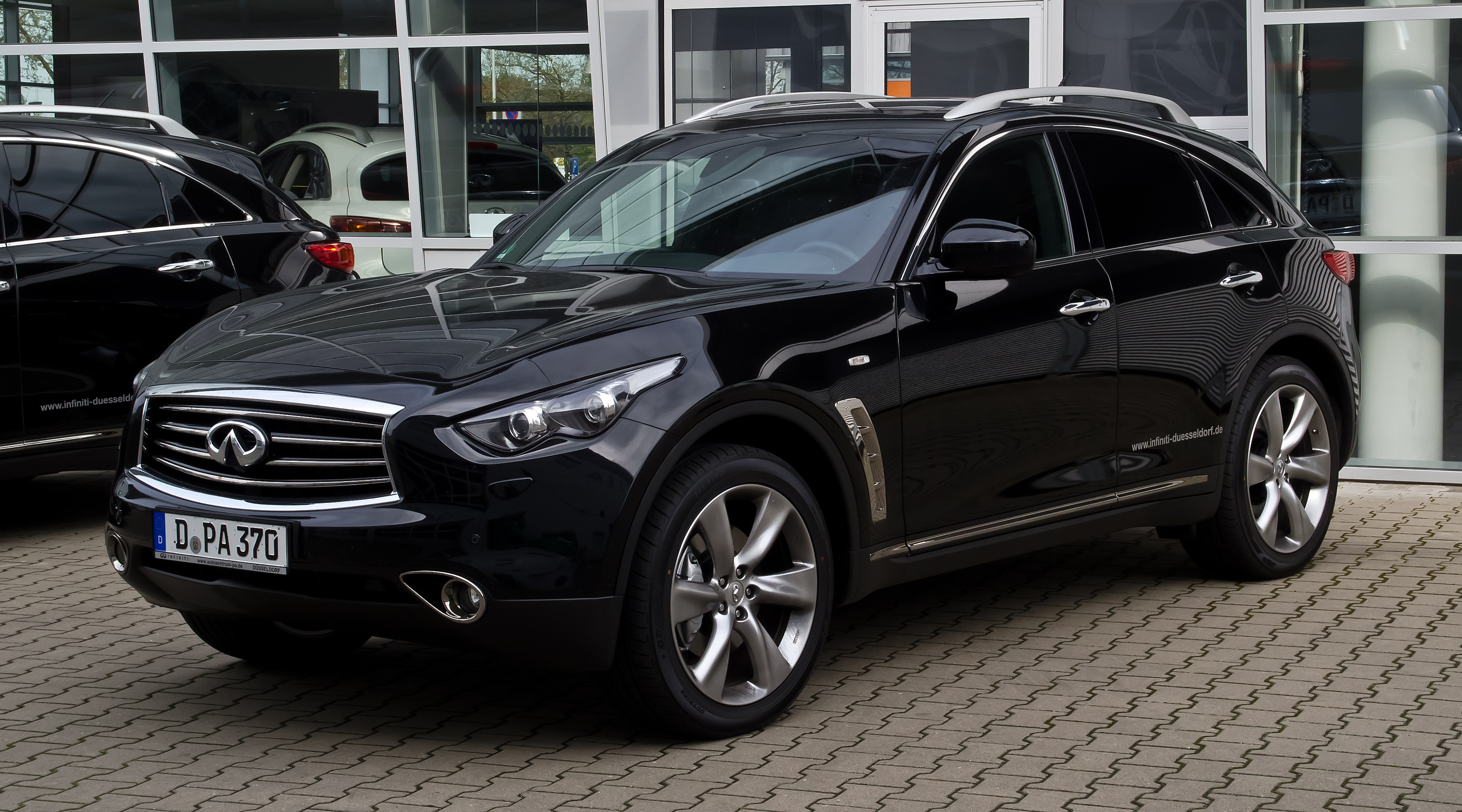
Facelift Infiniti FX S (Germany)

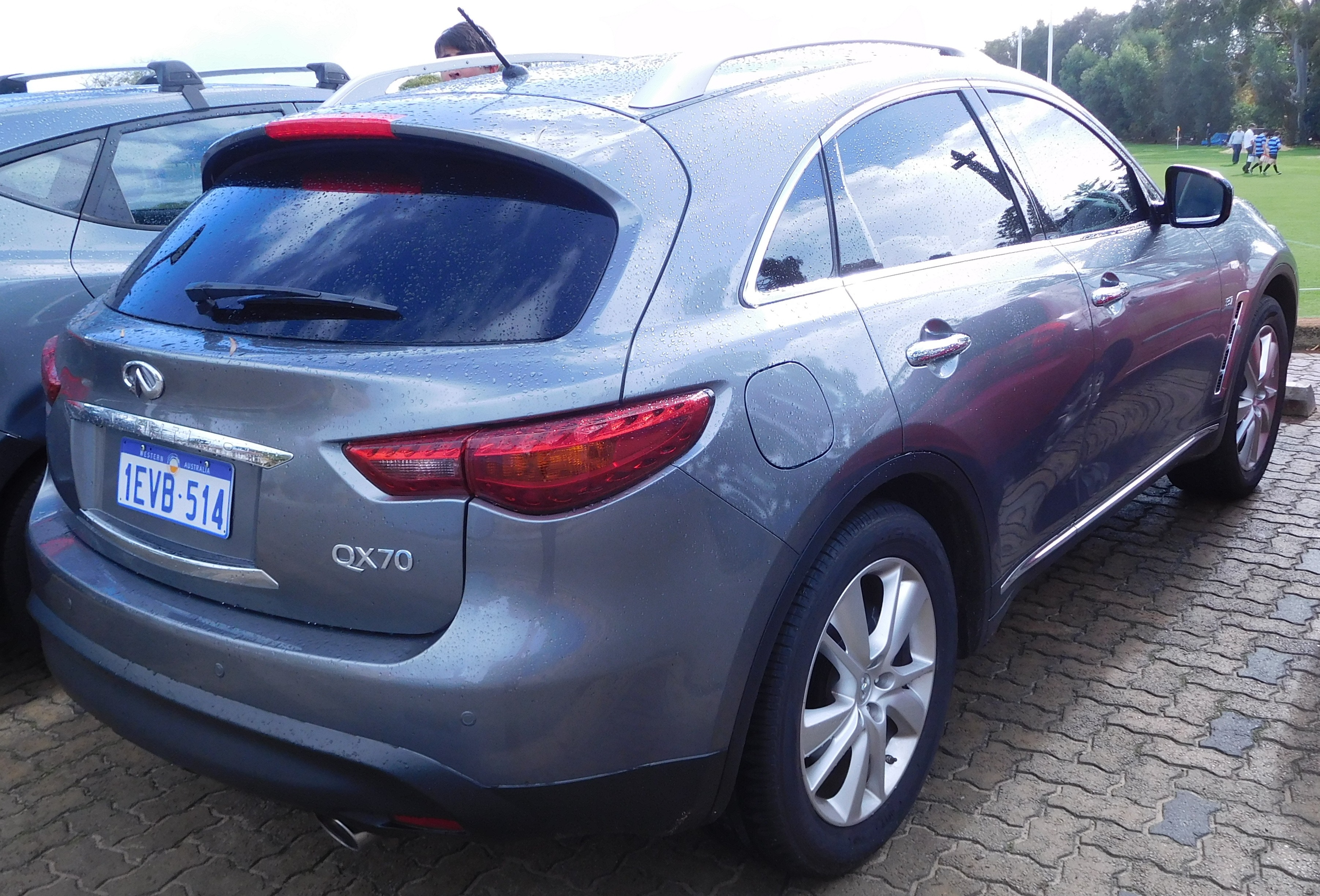
Facelift Infiniti QX70 GT (Australia)

Changes to the Infiniti FX include a redesigned front grille and front fascia design, revised meter illumination, standard heated front seats on all models, a new exterior color, Graphite Shadow (replaces Platinum Graphite), a new 20-inch wheel design for the FX35 Deluxe Touring Package, the addition of Adaptive Front-lighting System (AFS) to the FX50 Sport Package, a shift of the quilted leather climate-controlled front seats to the FX35 Deluxe Touring Package from the Premium Package.

The Limited Edition is based on the FX35 AWD, with exclusive Iridium Blue body color, 21-inch 10-spoke dark finish aluminum-alloy turbine wheels, Infiniti Hard Drive Navigation System, Around View Monitor, dark tinted adaptive headlamps, and dark tinted side air vents, and lower door trim.

US models went on sale in October 2011. Early models included FX35, FX35 AWD, FX50 AWD.

===== Sebastian Vettel Edition concept (2011) =====
It is a version of the Infiniti FX50 with Moonlight White body color, matte white exterior color, F1-inspired carbon fiber front air dam with white LED running lights, F1-inspired side skirts and rear air dam, 21-inch 10-spoke black-finish aluminum wheels, dark-tinted adaptive headlamps, dark tinted rear tail lamps, satin aluminum door handles, side air vents and exterior trim, carbon fiber rear wing, carbon-fiber interior trim, F1-inspired steering wheel and suede seating surfaces, unique Sebastian Vettel badging on the side fenders, rear liftgate, interior center console and embroidered front seats; increased engine power to 420 PS (309 kW; 414 hp), a front air dam providing increased downforce, 20 millimeters lower ride height and 30 percent improved coefficient of drag over the standard FX.

The vehicle was unveiled in the 2011 Frankfurt Motor Show by Formula 1 driver Sebastian Vettel.

===== Sebastian Vettel Edition (2012-2013) =====
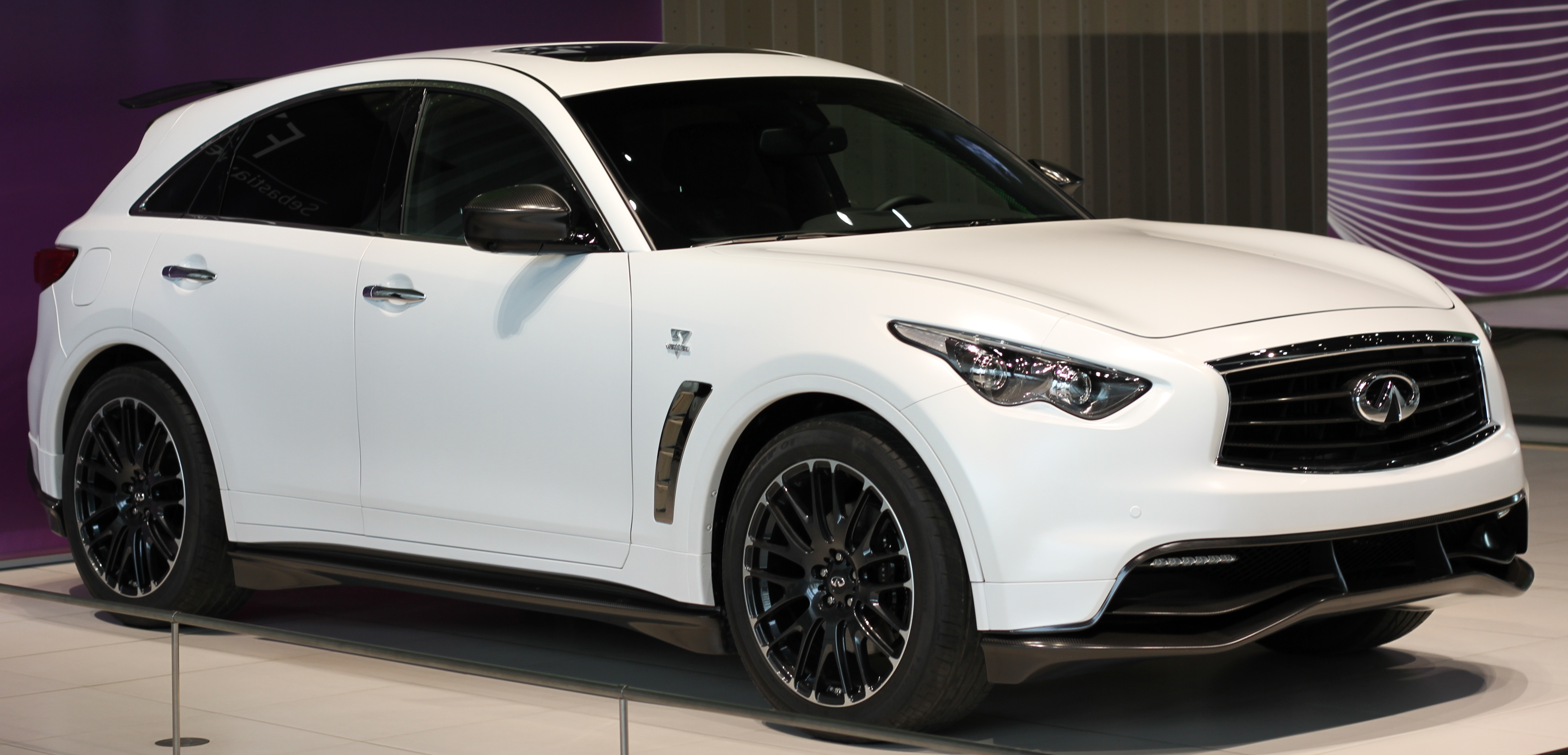
FX Sebastian Vettel Edition

It is a limited (150 units (50 in Western Europe)) version of the Infiniti FX50 based on the Sebastian Vettel Edition concept, with Moonlight White body color.

The vehicle was unveiled in the 2012 Geneva Motor Show.

UK models went on sale for £100,800, with a carbon rear spoiler available at an extra cost.

=== QX70 (2013) ===
The vehicle was renamed the QX in 2013, for the 2014 model year in the US. It was first unveiled at the 2013 Geneva Motor Show. The name change also brought a light facelift.

US models went on sale in June 2013 as 2014 model year vehicles. Early models included QX70 5.0 AWD, QX70 3.7 AWD and QX70 3.7. 5.0 AWD was last offered in the U.S. in the 2014 model year.

In August 2013, total of 3,026 QX70 vehicles were delivered, for a cumulative total of 20,556 vehicles.

==== 2016 update ====
The QX70 Limited was unveiled at the 2016 New York International Auto Show. US models of QX70 Limited went on sale in summer 2016, followed by the QX70 3.7 and 3.7 AWD. In July 2017, it was announced that the US-market QX70 would not be offered in the 2018 model year due to poor sales and the company's focus to the better-selling QX50.

Three QX70 vehicles were used in the Riyadh campaign titled 'Inspired Light by Infiniti'.

==== Drivetrains ====
Gasoline engines
Model	Years	Type/code	Power, torque/rpm
3.7	2013–2019	3,696 cc (225.5 cu in) V6 (VQ37VHR)	330 PS (243 kW; 325 hp) at 7000, 36.9 kg⋅m (362 N⋅m; 267 lbf⋅ft) at 5200
3.7 AWD	2013–2019	3,696 cc (225.5 cu in) V6 (VQ37VHR)	330 PS (243 kW; 325 hp) at 7000, 36.9 kg⋅m (362 N⋅m; 267 lbf⋅ft) at 5200
5.0 AWD	2013-2014	5,026 cc (306.7 cu in) V8 (VK50VE)	395 PS (291 kW; 390 hp) at 6500, 51.0 kg⋅m (500 N⋅m; 369 lbf⋅ft) at 4400

Gasoline engines
Model	Years	Types
3.7	2013–2019	7-speed automatic with Adaptive Shift Control
3.7 AWD	2013–2019	7-speed automatic with Adaptive Shift Control
5.0 AWD	2013-2014	7-speed automatic with Adaptive Shift Control

== Safety ==
ANCAP test results* Infiniti FX (2012)
Test	Score
Overall	5 /5 stars
Frontal offset	12.50/16
Side impact	16/16
Pole	2/2
Seat belt reminders	3/3
Whiplash protection	Good
Pedestrian protection	Marginal
Electronic stability control	Standard

ANCAP test results* Infiniti QX70 (2012)
Test	Score
Overall	5 /5 stars
Frontal offset	12.50/16
Side impact	16/16
Pole	2/2
Seat belt reminders	3/3
Whiplash protection	Good
Pedestrian protection	Marginal
Electronic stability control	Standard

== Production ==
All vehicles were built at Nissan Motor Company's plant in Tochigi, Japan. Between 2013 and 2014, they were also built at Nissan Motor Company's plant in Shushari, Saint-Petersburg, Russia.
