= Nissan FM platform =

Automobile layout

The Nissan FM platform is a FR automobile layout. The name is derived from the "front midships" location of the engine, with its center of mass located behind the front axle centerline, shifting weight to the middle of the car, leaving the front suspension less encumbered. The engine is pushed as far back to the firewall as possible, creating a weight distribution close to 50:50 and enabling the front wheels to be placed close to the corners for better handling.

This platform debuted with the 2001 V35-series Infiniti G-series/Nissan Skyline, and was then used as the basis of nearly all of Nissan's rear and all-wheel drive applications. The platform was revised for use in the JDM Nissan Fuga/USDM Infiniti M35/45, being stretched in wheelbase and reinforced for additional torsional rigidity, a version referred to as the "enhanced FM" platform. The GT-R is built on Nissan's Premium Midship (PM) platform, an evolution of the Front Midship (FM) architecture.

== Applications ==
=== FM platform ===
- Infiniti G35/Nissan Skyline V35-series
- Infiniti G25/G35/G37/Infiniti Q40/Nissan Skyline V36-series
- Infiniti Q50/Nissan Skyline V37-series
- Infiniti Q60 CV36-series
- Infiniti Q60 CV37-series
- Infiniti M35/M45/Nissan Fuga Y50-series
- Infiniti M25/M37/M56/M35h/M30D/M25L/M35HL/M37L/M56L/Infiniti Q70/Q70L/Nissan Fuga/Nissan Cima Y51-series
- Infiniti EX/Infiniti QX50/Nissan Skyline Crossover J50-series
- Infiniti FX S50-series
- Infiniti FX/Infiniti QX70 S51-series
- Mitsubishi Proudia BY51-series
- Mitsubishi Dignity BHGY51-series
- Nissan 350Z Z33-series
- Nissan 370Z Z34-series
- Nissan Z RZ34-series
- Nissan Stagea M35-series

=== PM platform ===
- Nissan GT-R R35-series (PM platform)
