= Infiniti QX50 =

Compact luxury crossover SUV

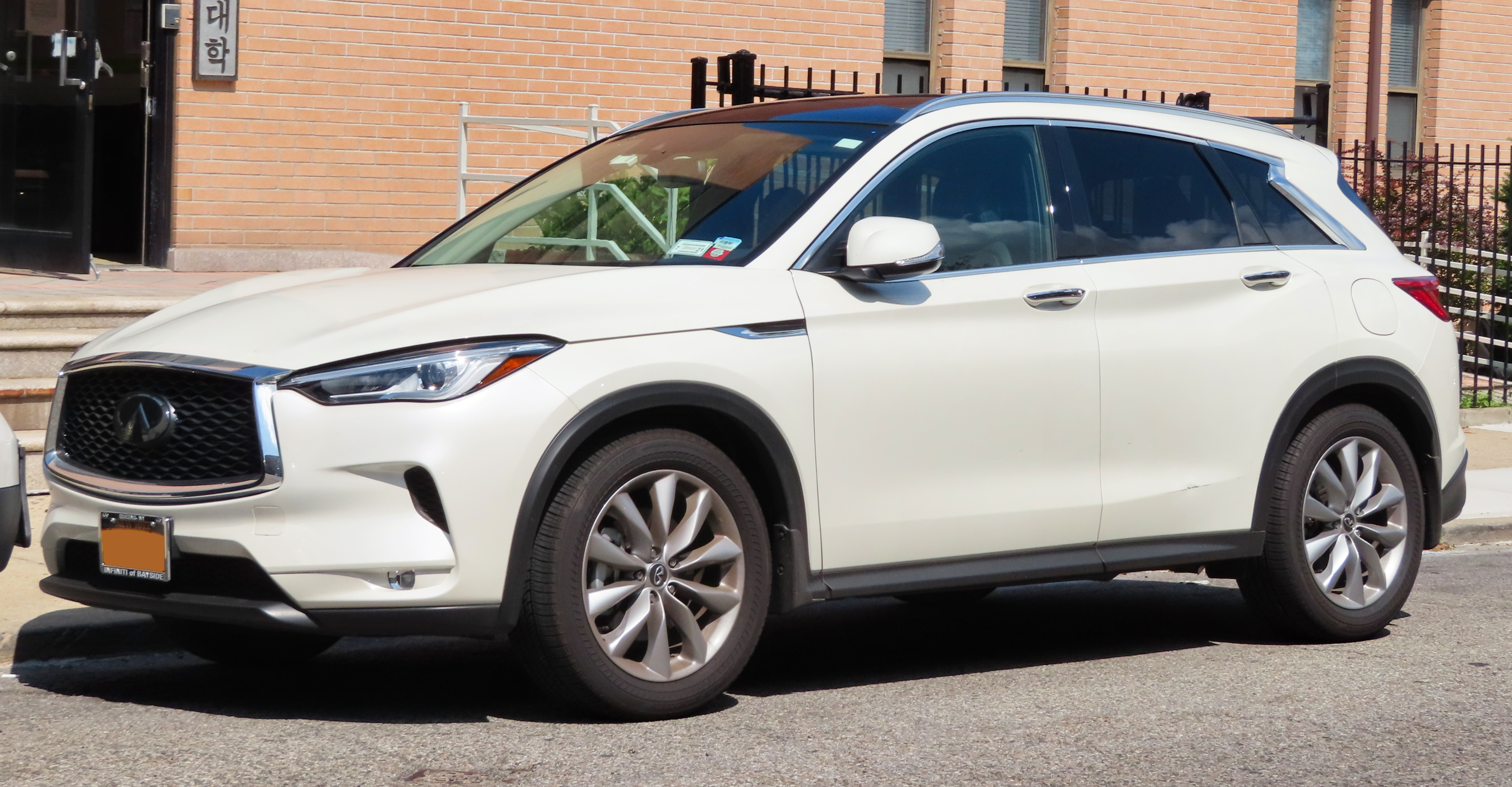
- Infiniti QX50 (J55)

Overview
- Manufacturer: Nissan
- Also called: Nissan Skyline Crossover (2007–2015); Infiniti EX (2007–2013)
- Production: 2007–2013 (EX); 2013–2025 (QX50); 2021–2025 (QX55)

Body and chassis
- Class: Compact luxury crossover SUV
- Body style: 5-door SUV
- Layout: Front-engine, rear-wheel-drive (until 2017); Front-engine, front-wheel-drive (2017–2025); Front-engine, four-wheel-drive

The Infiniti QX50, formerly the Infiniti EX until 2013, is a crossover SUV marketed by Infiniti, Nissan's luxury division between 2007 and 2025. It was produced over two generations: one generation under both EX and QX50 nameplates, and the second generation under the QX50 nameplate. The first generation model was also marketed as the Nissan Skyline Crossover in Japan.

The first generation QX50 was a minor model update of the EX with its nameplate changed to QX50 to align with the marque's new Q and QX nomenclature introduced for model year 2013 (China) and model year 2015 (United States). The second-generation QX50 entered production in November 2017 as a 2019 model.

== First generation (J50; 2007) ==
First generation
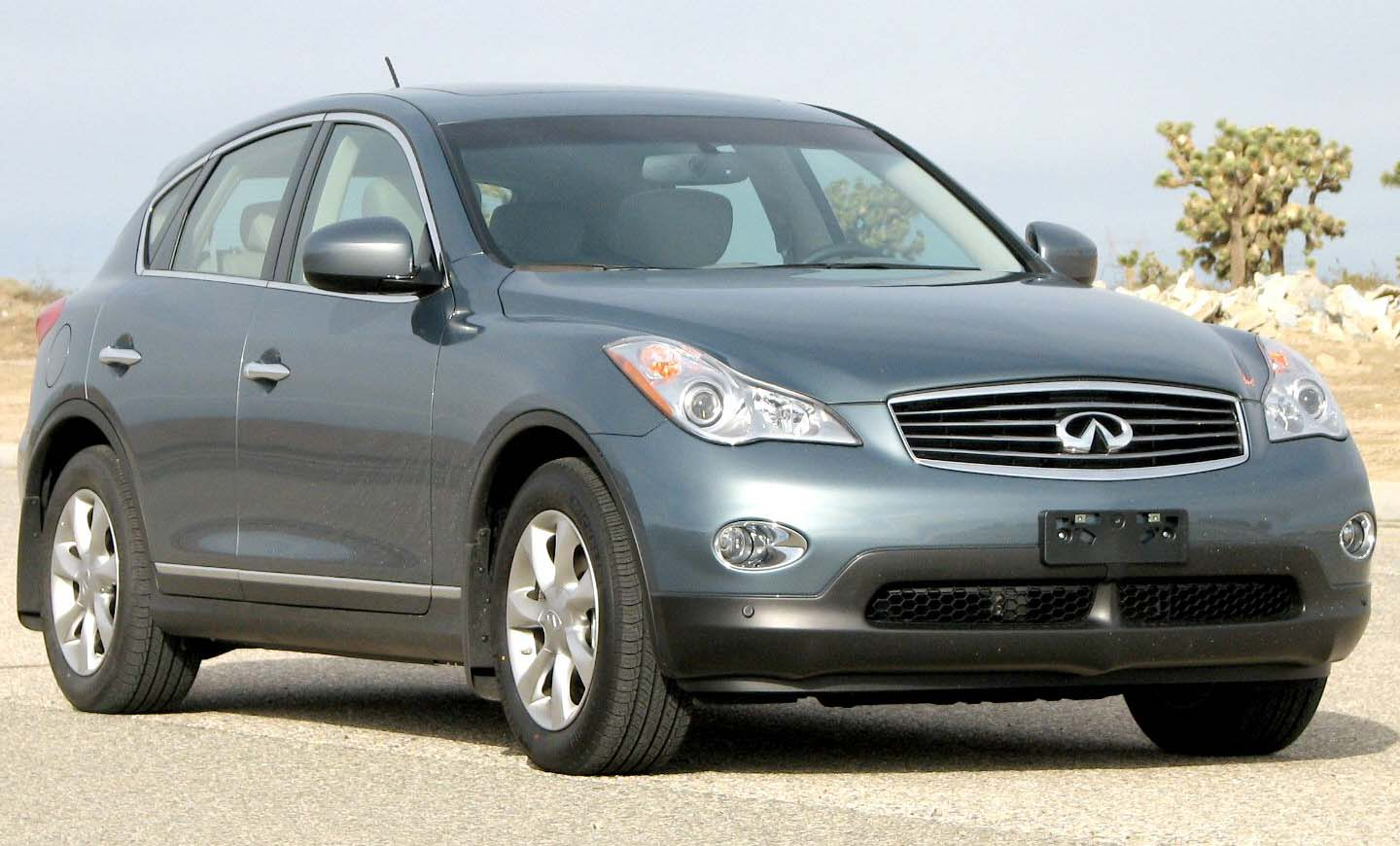
- 2008 Infiniti EX35

Overview
- Model code: J50
- Also called: Nissan Skyline Crossover; Infiniti EX (2007–2013)
- Production: 2007–2013 (EX); 2013–2017 (QX50)
- Model years: 2008–2013 (EX); 2014–2017 (QX50)
- Assembly: Japan: Kaminokawa, Tochigi (Nissan Tochigi Plant)
- Designer: Tadayoshi Iida (2004, 2005)

Body and chassis
- Layout: Front engine, rear-wheel drive; Front-engine, all-wheel drive
- Platform: Nissan FM platform
- Related: Infiniti FX; Infiniti G37/Nissan Skyline V36; Infiniti M/Nissan Fuga Y51; Nissan 370Z/Fairlady Z Z34

Powertrain
- Engine: Petrol: 3.5 L VQ35HR V6; 3.7 L VQ37VHR V6; Diesel: 3.0 L V9X V6 turbo
- Power output: 235–320 hp (175–239 kW; 238–324 PS)
- Transmission: 7-speed automatic (Manual Shift-ability)

Dimensions
- Wheelbase: 110.2–113.4 in (2,799–2,880 mm)
- Length: 182.3 in (4,630 mm); 186.8 in (4,745 mm) (2015–17)
- Width: 71.0 in (1,803 mm)
- Height: 2013–15: 61.0 in (1,549 mm); 2015–17: 62.7 in (1,593 mm)

=== Infiniti EX ===
==== Infiniti EX Concept (2007) ====
Infiniti presented a preliminary concept for the EX at the 2007 New York Auto Show, notable for its surround-view camera (marketed as Around View Monitor), lane departure system, V6 engine, 5-speed automatic transmission, all-wheel-drive, double-arch grille, large L-shaped headlights with adaptive front lighting system (AFS), integrated fog lights, LED taillights and an "arch" profile design.

==== EX35 (2007-2013) ====
Infiniti presented the EX35 production model at the 2007 Pebble Beach Concours d'Elegance, followed by Jamsil Olympic Stadium in Seoul.

North American EX35 models went on sale in December 2007 for model year 2008 — in rear- or all-wheel drive, using the Nissan FM platform. The EX35 was offered with a 297 hp (221 kW; 301 PS) 3.5 L V6 (VQ35HR) until it was rebadged in 2013 as EX37 with a 325 hp (242 kW) 3.7 L V6 (VQ37VHR). For the 2014 model year, Infiniti again rebadged all of its models, renaming the EX37 as QX50.

South Korean model went on sale in 24 January 2008 as a 2008 model year vehicle.

==== EX37 ====
===== European market =====
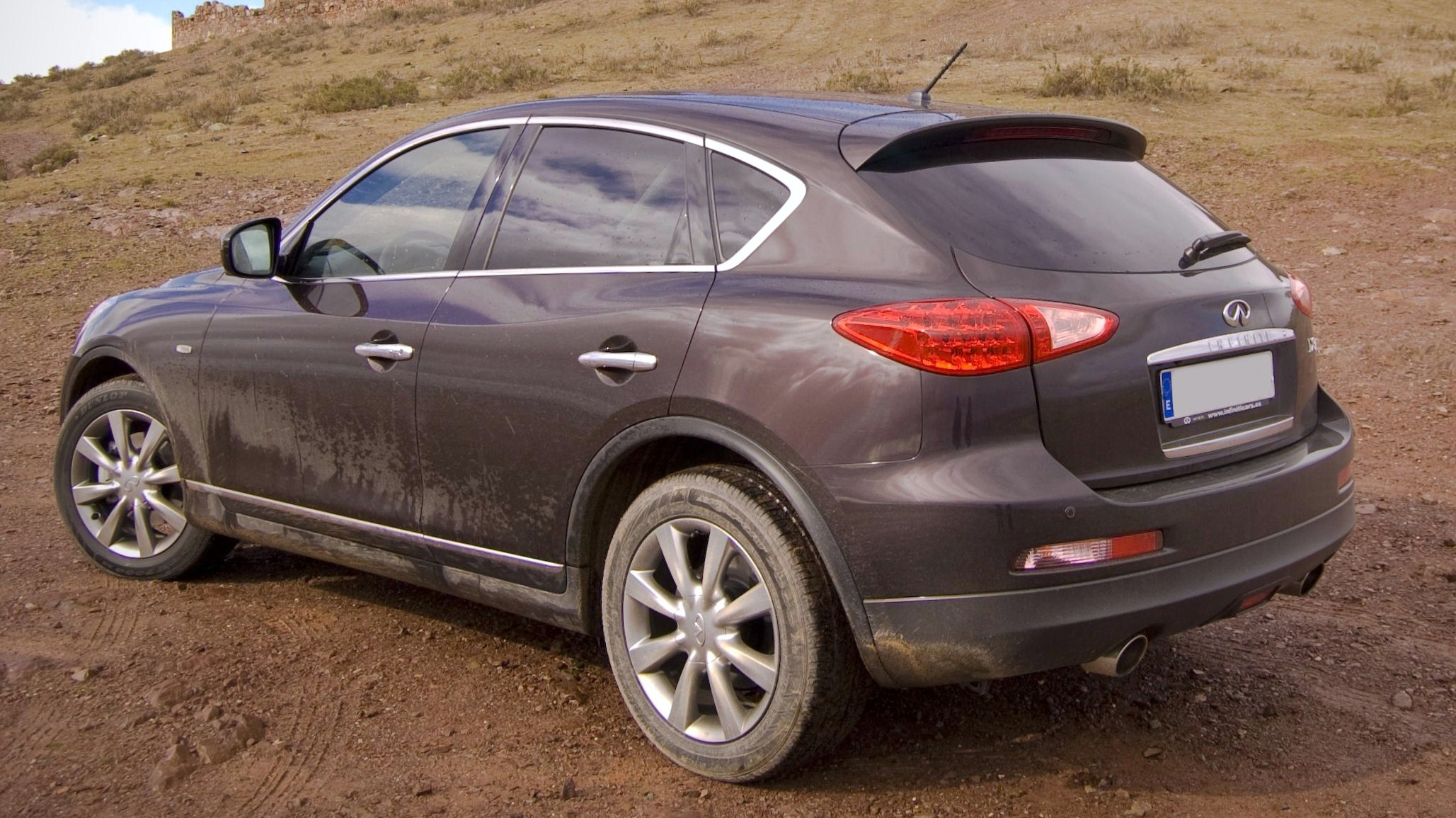
Infiniti EX37

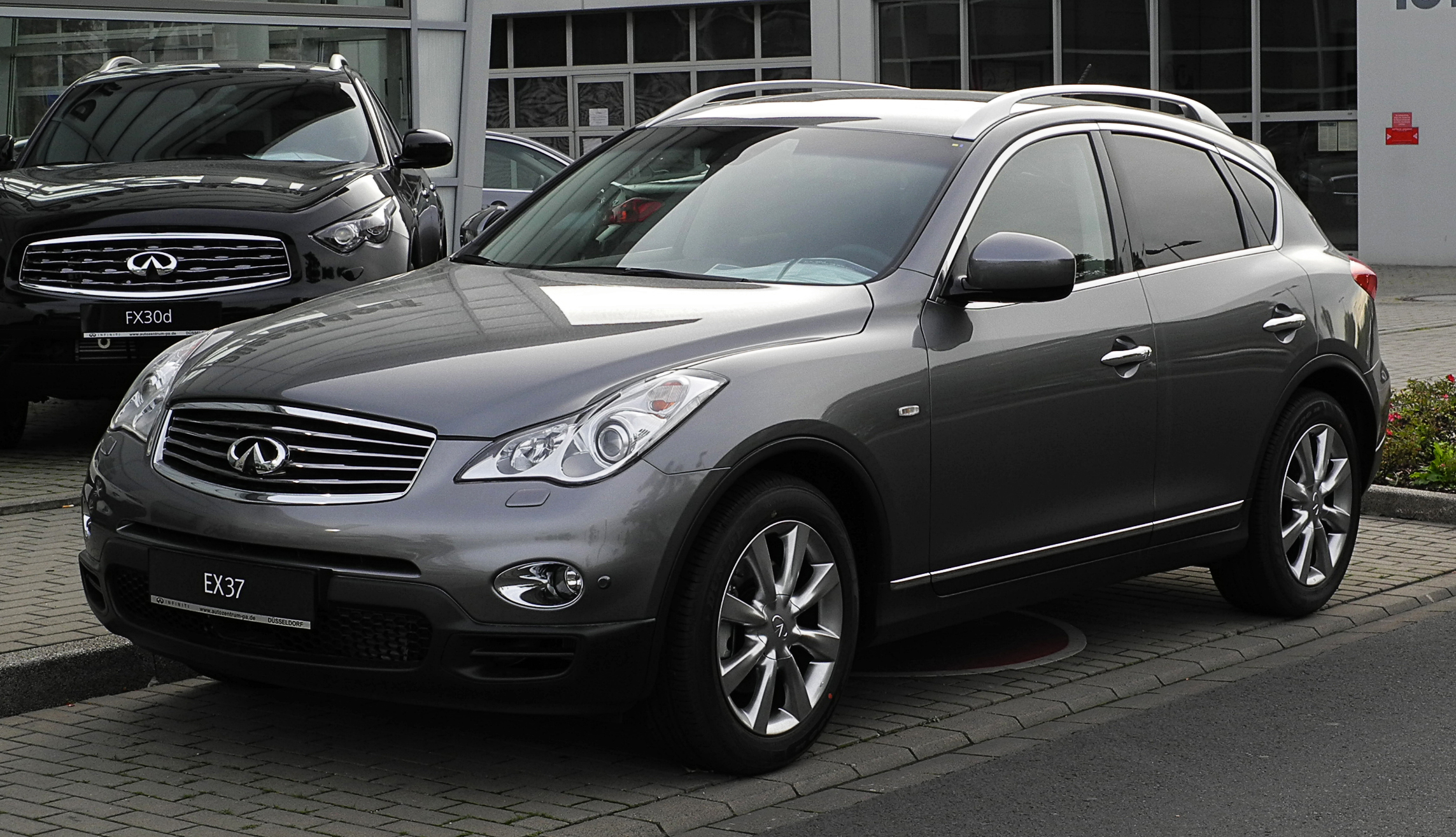
2011 Infiniti EX

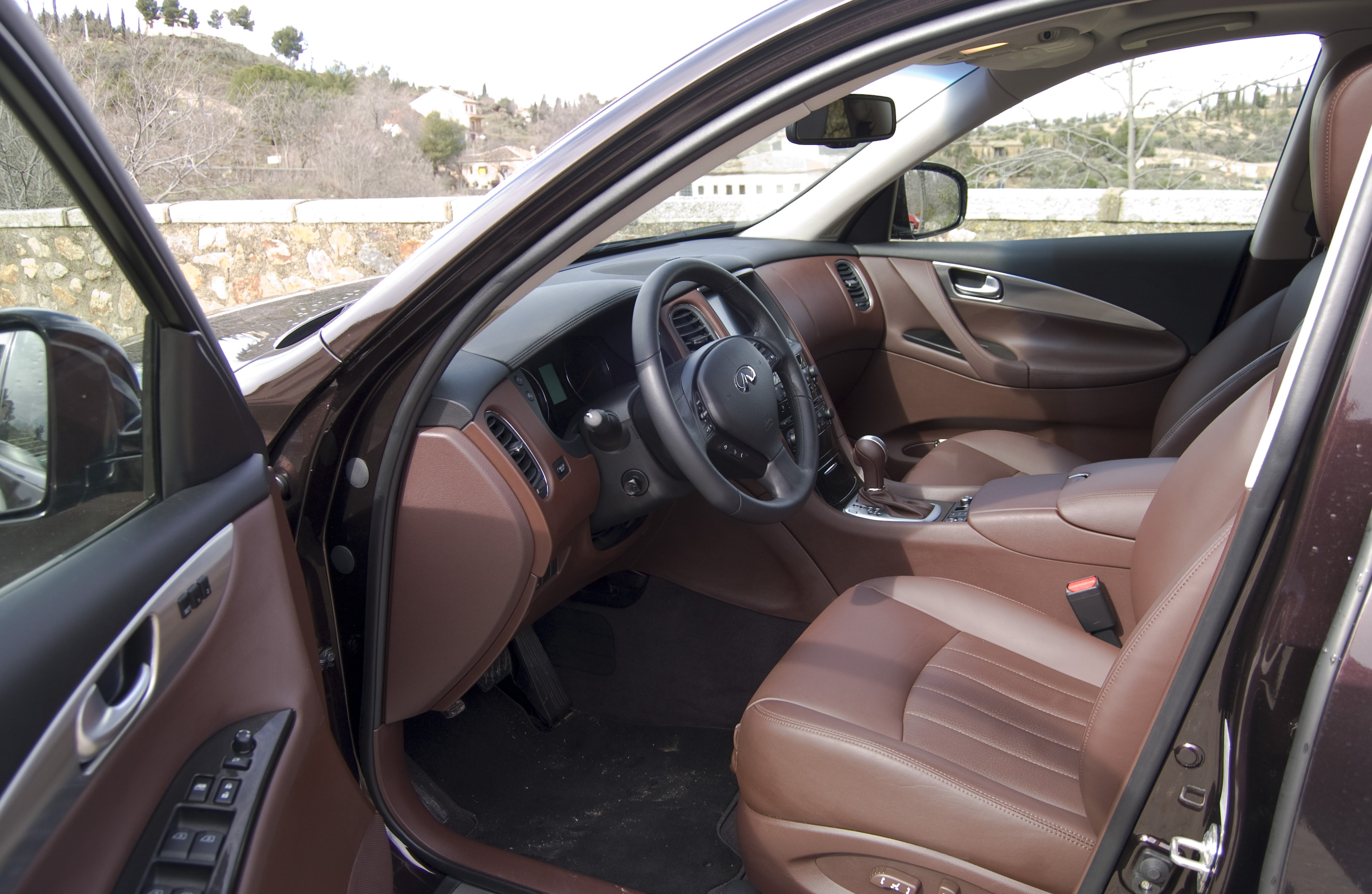
Infiniti EX37 interior

The Infiniti EX is sold as the EX37 in the European market. It debuted in late 2008. Japanese versions are badged as the Nissan Skyline Crossover.

==== EX30d ====
The brand entered the European market with a new 3.0-liter V6 diesel (V9X). The engine was the first Diesel in the Infiniti brand's 20-year history. The engine produces 235 hp (175 kW; 238 PS) at 3750 RPM and 550 N⋅m (410 lb⋅ft) of torque at 1750 RPM.

European model went on sale as a 2010 model year vehicle.

==== EX25 ====
The VQ25HR V6 engine delivers 218 hp (163 kW; 221 PS) and peak torque of 253 N⋅m (187 lb⋅ft). The engine is mated to a seven-speed automatic transmission. It was launched at the 2010 Beijing International Automotive Exhibition. The EX25 Crossover is currently marketed only in China, Malaysia, Russia and Ukraine.

==== Engines ====
Model	Years	Type/code	Power	Torque
EX25	2010–2012	2.5 L V6 24-valve (VQ25HR)	218 hp (163 kW) @6,800rpm	185 lb⋅ft (251 N⋅m) @4,800rpm
EX37	2013–2014	3.7 L V6 24-valve (VQ37VHR)	325 hp (242 kW) @7,000rpm	267 lb⋅ft (362 N⋅m) @5,200rpm
EX35	2007-2012	3.5 L V6 24-valve (VQ35HR)	297 hp (221 kW) @6,800rpm	253 lb⋅ft (343 N⋅m) @4,800rpm
EX30d	2010–2014	3.0 L V6 24-valve (V9X)	235 hp (175 kW) @3,750rpm	550 N⋅m (410 lb⋅ft) @1,750 rpm

==== Transmissions ====
Model	Years	Type
EX35	2007-2010	5-speed automatic
EX35	2011-2012	7-speed automatic
EX37	2013-2014	7-speed automatic
EX30d	2010-	7-speed automatic

Transmissions include manual shift mode that includes the option of sequentially selected manual gearshifts and Downshift Rev Matching (DRM). U.S. models include a choice of RWD or ATTESA E-TS AWD. Models sold in Canada, Europe include ATTESA E-TS AWD as standard.

The Infiniti EX35 line has a 0–60 mph (97 km/h) time of 5.8–6.2 seconds. The quarter mile is 14.6 seconds at 98 mph (158 km/h), and top speed is electronically limited to 144 mph (232 km/h). 70 mph (113 km/h)–0 braking is a 166 feet (51 m). Roadholding is 0.83g.

==== Features ====
The EX was the first production automobile to offer a surround-view camera, marketed as Around View Monitor. The cameras are located at the front, back and sides of the vehicle and feed images to an image processing unit; those individual inputs are analyzed, synthesized to offer a synthetic, but positionally accurate, somewhat lifelike top-down view of the car and its surroundings.

The EX was one of the first production automobiles to feature "Scratch Shield," a "self-healing clearcoat paint. The paint self-repairs fine scratches, such as fingernail scratches under door handles, restoring the EX's surface close to the original state. The process, which takes anywhere from one day to one week (depending on the surrounding temperature and the depth of the scratch), is accomplished through the use of an elastic resin. It is combined with a conventional clearcoat to increase the paint's flexibility and strength by raising the resin density."

The EX was the second Infiniti production vehicle, following the 2008 Infiniti M series, to offer the Lane Departure Prevention (LDP) system. This utilizes the electronic stability control system to help assist the driver in maintaining lane position by applying gentle brake pressure on each wheel individually to generate intended movement. It sounds an alert and nudges the vehicle in the correct direction when lane departure is detected. It also applies braking actuation to bring vehicle back in the lane.

=== Infiniti QX50 ===
==== QX50 (2013) ====
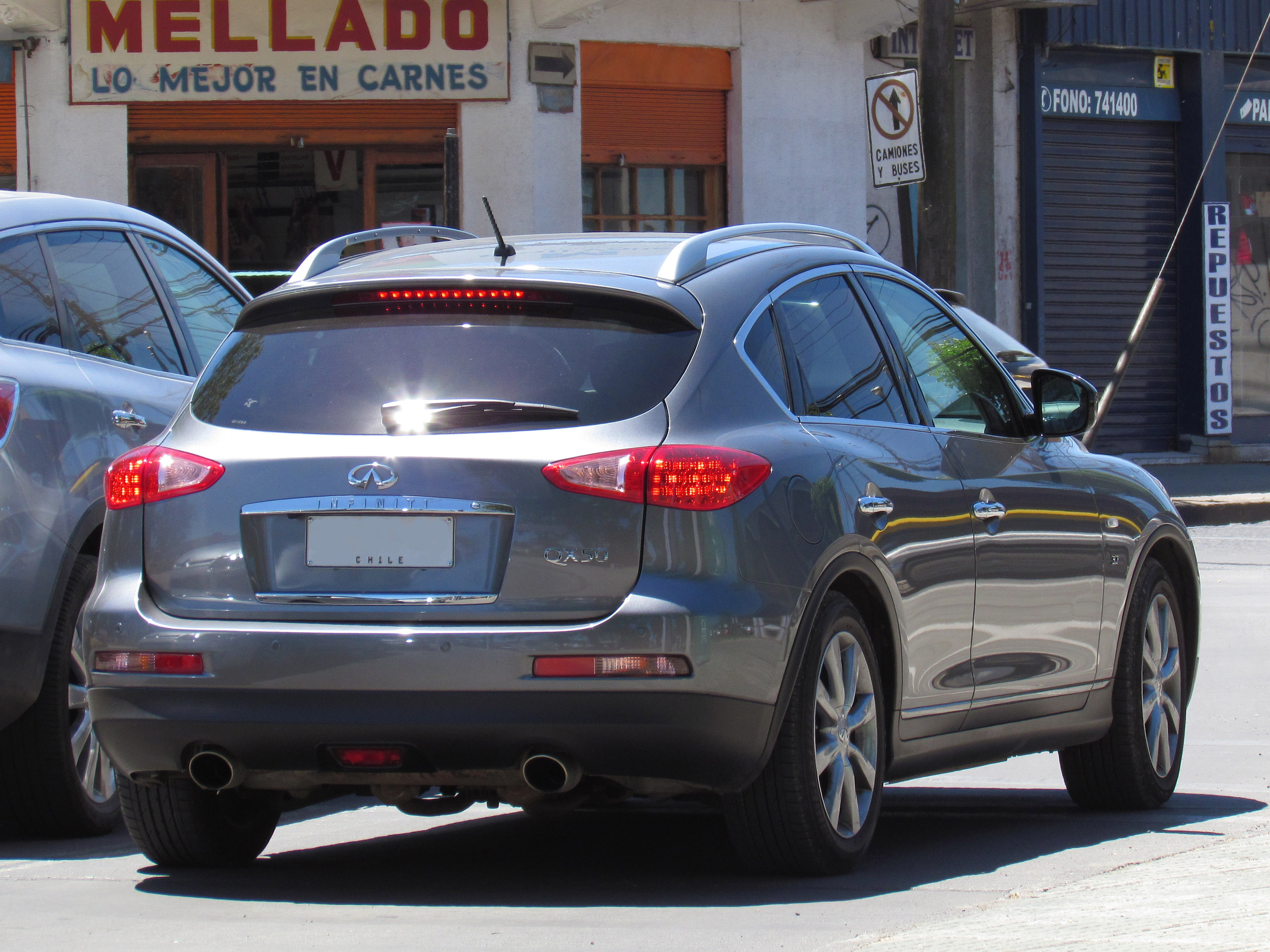
Pre-facelift rear

The vehicle was unveiled in the 2013 Nanjing Auto Show.

Middle East market models went on sale as a 2014 model year vehicle. Early models include VQ37VHR 3.7-liter V6 (326PS) engine with all wheel drive, 7-speed automatic transmission with manual shift mode, DS mode with Downshift Rev Matching (DRM), and Adaptive Shift Control.

US models went on sale as 2014 model year vehicles. Early models included QX50, QX50 AWD, QX50 Journey and QX50 AWD Journey.

==== QX50L (2015) ====
The China model was set to go on sale in 2015.

==== Engines ====
Gasoline engines
Model	Years	Type/code	Power	Torque
3.7 AWD (320PS)	2013-2017	3,696 cc (226 cu in) V6 (Nissan VQ37VHR)	320 PS (235 kW; 316 hp) @7000rpm	360 N⋅m (266 lb⋅ft) @5200rpm
3.7 AWD (326PS)	2013-2017	3,696 cc (226 cu in) V6 (Nissan VQ37VHR)	326 PS (240 kW; 322 hp) @7000rpm	360 N⋅m (266 lb⋅ft) @5200rpm
3.7 (330PS)	2013-2017	3,696 cc (226 cu in) V6 (Nissan VQ37VHR)	330 PS (243 kW; 325 hp) @7000rpm	360 N⋅m (266 lb⋅ft) @5200rpm
3.7 AWD (330PS)	2013-2017	3,696 cc (226 cu in) V6 (Nissan VQ37VHR)	330 PS (243 kW; 325 hp) @7000rpm	360 N⋅m (266 lb⋅ft) @5200rpm

Diesel engines
Model	Years	Type/code	Power	Torque
3.0d AWD	2013-2017	2,993 cc (183 cu in) V6 turbo (V9X)	238 PS (175 kW; 235 hp) @3750rpm	550 N⋅m (406 lb⋅ft) @1750rpm

==== Transmissions ====
Gasoline engines
Model	Years	Types
3.7 AWD (320PS)	2013-2017	electronically controlled 7-speed automatic transmission with manual mode
3.7 AWD (326PS)	2013-2017	electronically controlled 7-speed automatic transmission with manual mode

Diesel engines
Model	Years	Types
3.0d AWD	2013-2017	electronically controlled 7-speed automatic transmission with manual mode

==== Production ====
Production of the Chinese models of QX50L at Xiangyang plant in Hubei Province was set to begin in 2014.

==== Marketing ====
Infiniti QX50L was used as the actors' official passenger vehicle for the Where Are We Going? Dad (爸爸去哪儿) television series.

=== 2015 update ===
==== QX50 (2015) ====
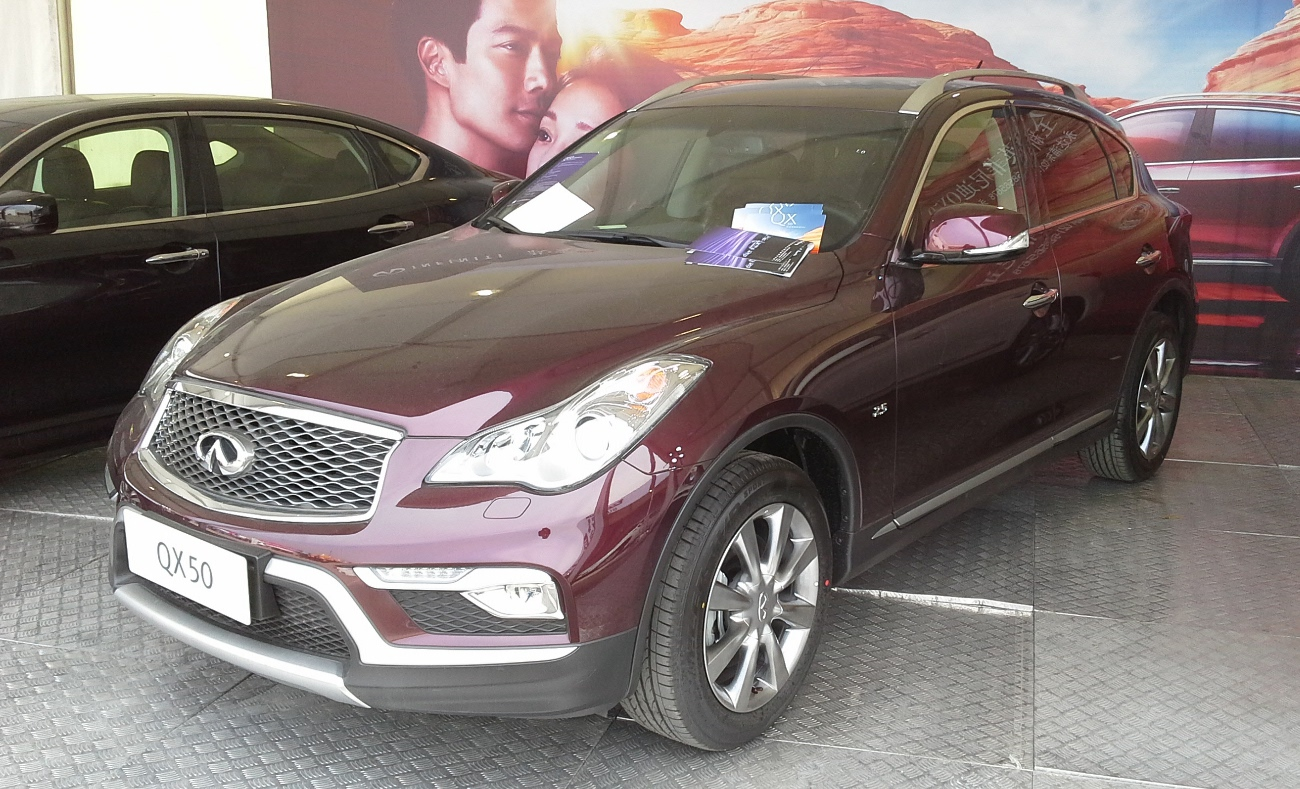
2015 facelift

Changes include overall length increased by 80 millimeters (3.1 inches), a redesigned grille and front bumper assembly that incorporate LED daylight running lights, optional automatically opened and closed tailgate hatch, optional full panoramic glass roof.

The vehicle was unveiled in the 2014 Guangzhou Motor Show, followed by the 2015 New York Auto Show.

Delivery of China model began in February 2015.

US models went on sale as a 2016 model year vehicle. Early models included 3.7, 3.7 AWD.

==== Engines ====
Gasoline engines
Model	Years	Type/code	Power	Torque
3.7 (330PS)	2015–2017	3,696 cc (226 cu in) V6 (Nissan VQ37VHR)	330 PS (243 kW; 325 hp) @7000rpm	360 N⋅m (266 lb⋅ft) @5200rpm
3.7 AWD (330PS)	2015–2017	3,696 cc (226 cu in) V6 (Nissan VQ37VHR)	330 PS (243 kW; 325 hp) @7000rpm	360 N⋅m (266 lb⋅ft) @5200rpm

==== Transmissions ====
Gasoline engines
Model	Years	Types
3.7 (330PS)	2015–2017	electronically controlled 7-speed automatic transmission with manual mode
3.7 AWD (330PS)	2015–2017	electronically controlled 7-speed automatic transmission with manual mode

== Second generation (J55; 2017) ==
Second generation
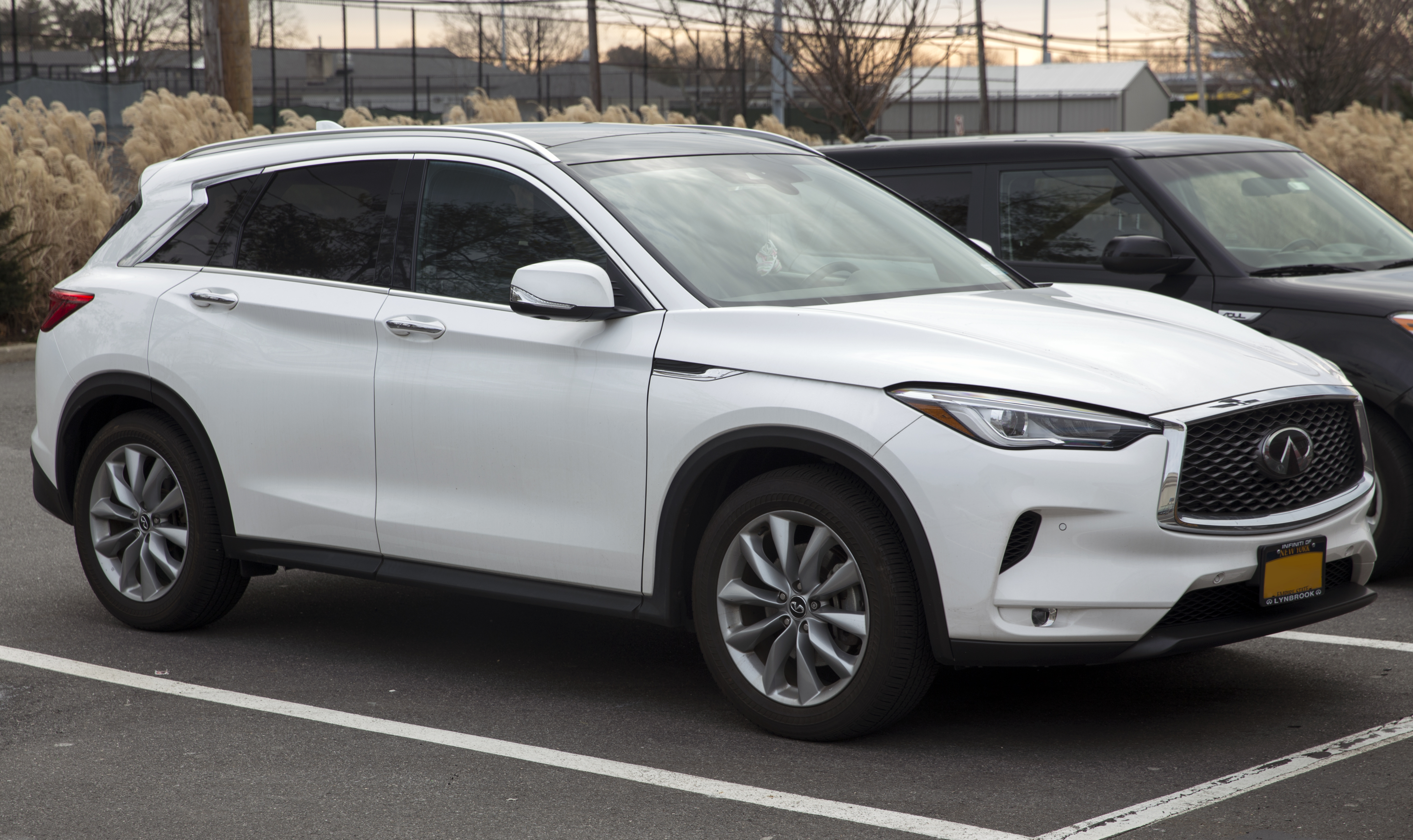

Overview
- Model code: J55
- Also called: Infiniti QX55
- Production: November 2017 – 2025
- Model years: 2019–2025 (QX50); 2022–2025 (QX55)
- Assembly: Mexico: Aguascalientes (Cooperation Manufacturing Plant Aguascalientes); China: Dalian
- Designer: Shiro Nakamura (2014)

Body and chassis
- Body style: 5-door SUV (QX50); 5-door coupé SUV (QX55)
- Layout: Front engine, front-wheel drive / all-wheel drive

Powertrain
- Engine: 2.0 L KR20DDET turbo I4 (gasoline)
- Power output: 268 hp (200 kW; 272 PS)
- Transmission: Xtronic CVT

Dimensions
- Wheelbase: 2,800 mm (110.2 in)
- Length: 4,700 mm (185.0 in)
- Width: 1,902 mm (74.9 in)
- Height: 1,676 mm (66.0 in)

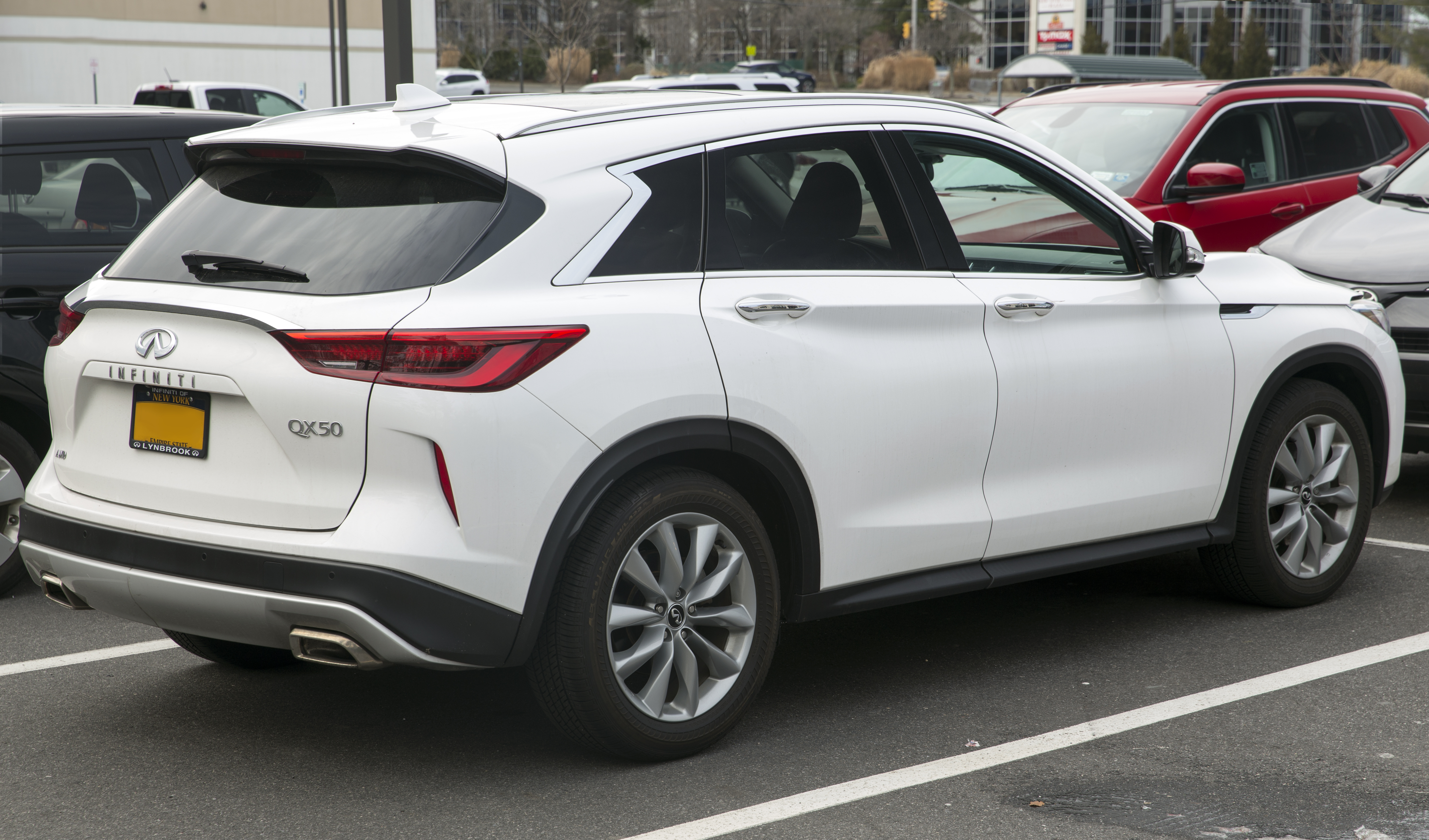
Rear view

The production version of the second-generation QX50 was presented at the 2017 LA Auto Show as a 2019 model with a turbocharged 2.0 L KR20DDET gasoline engine using Nissan's VC-T variable compression ratio system.

Production of the QX50 began in November 2017 at Cooperation Manufacturing Plant Aguascalientes, a Nissan and Daimler AG's joint plant in Aguascalientes, Mexico.

In January 2025, it was announced that the QX50 and the QX55 would be discontinued by the end of 2025.

Following tariffs imposed by the Trump Administration on all non-American built cars, parent company Nissan announced on April 3, 2025 that they would suspend all new US orders on QX50 and QX55 models for the foreseeable future, citing tariffs as the reason. Current inventory would be sold until depleted. Nissan also stated production would continue for both those models sold in all other markets.

=== QX55 (2022) ===
Introduced in the first quarter of 2021 for the 2022 model year, the QX55 is a "coupé SUV" version of the QX50 with a more sloped roof design. Infiniti intends it to be the spiritual successor to the FX.

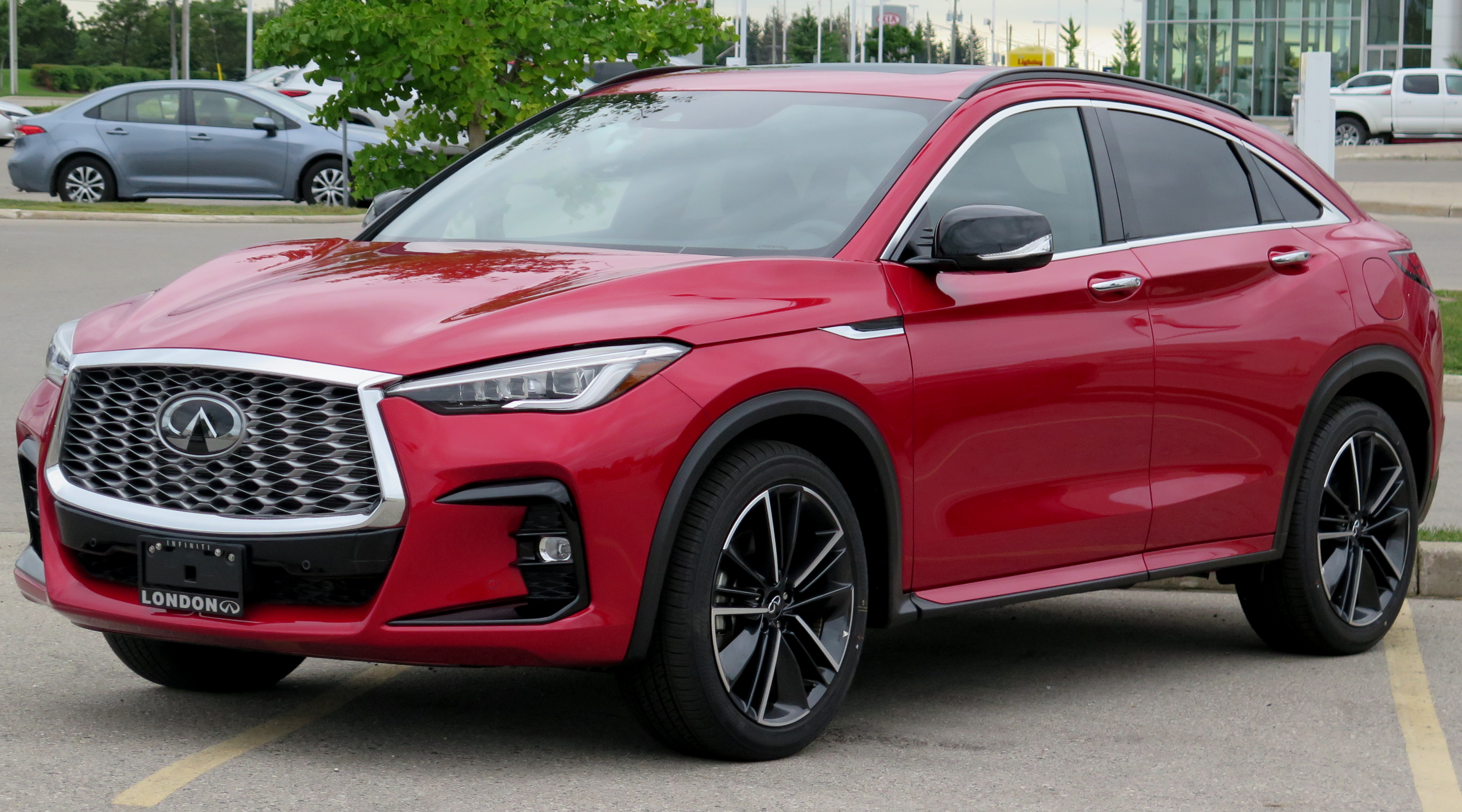
2022 Infiniti QX55

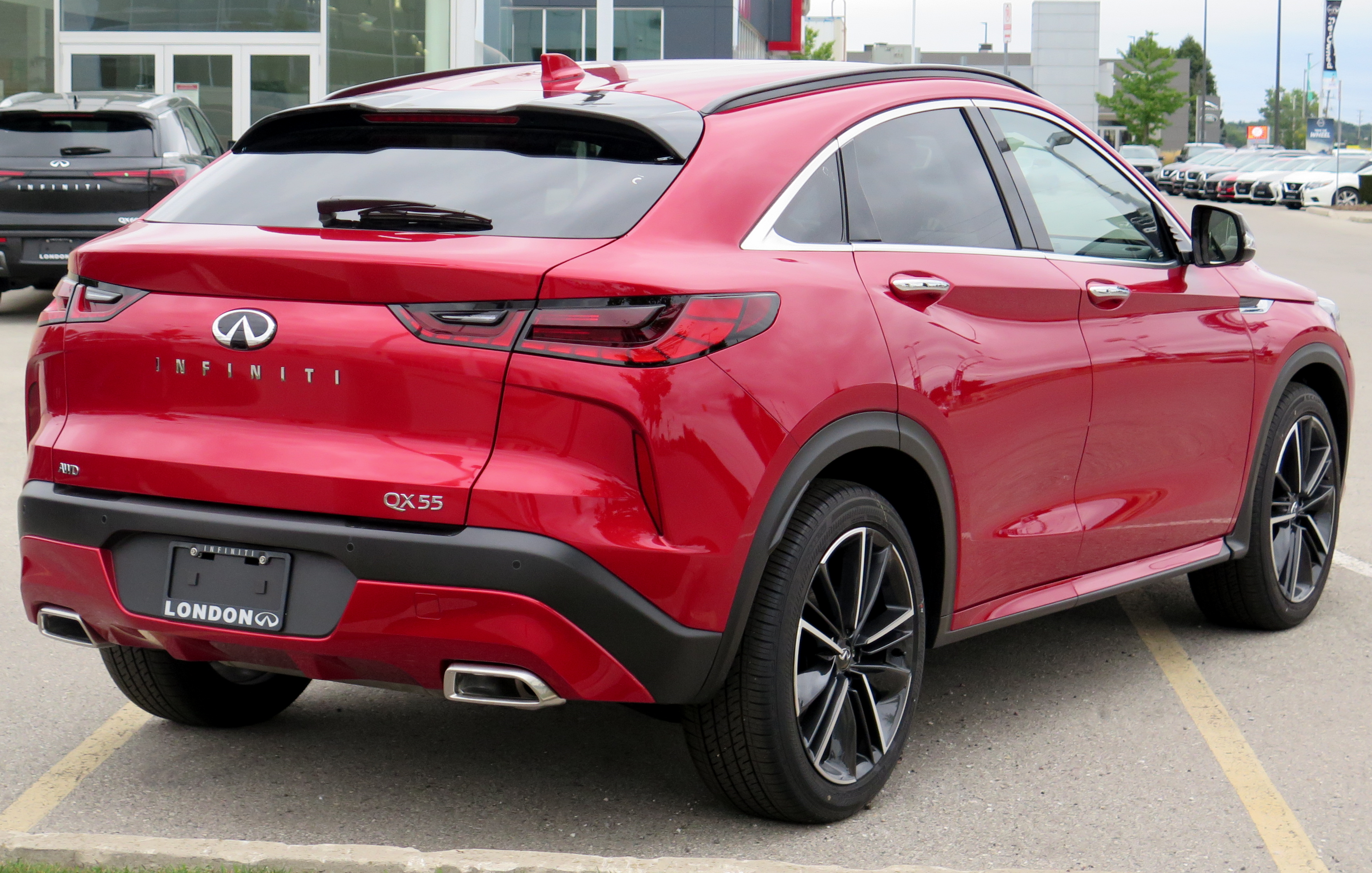
Rear view

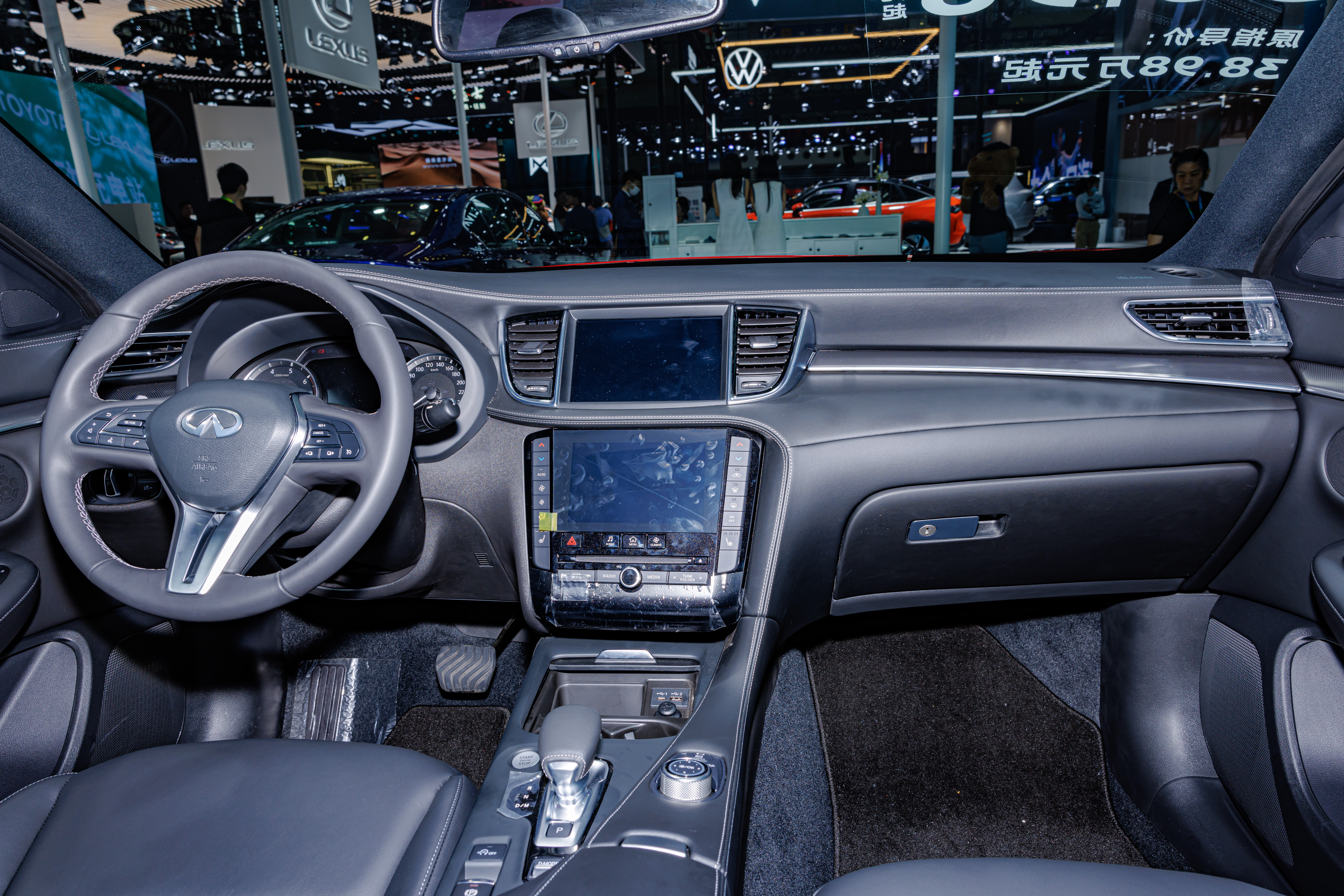
Interior

=== QX Sport Inspiration Concept (2016) ===
It included 21-inch wheels, black and white interior upholstery.

The vehicle was unveiled in the 2016 Beijing Motor Show, followed by the 2016 Paris Motor Show (with gray body color, 22-inch wheels in bronze, brown leather interior upholstery, 2.0-liter inline-four variable compression engine with compression ratio between 8:1 and 14:1), 2016 Los Angeles Auto Show (with black and white interior upholstery).

=== QX50 Concept (2017) ===
It included a 2.0-liter inline-four variable compression engine with compression ratio between 8:1 and 14:1, front-drive platform.

The vehicle was unveiled in the 2017 North American International Auto Show.

=== KR20DDT engine NHTSA investigation ===
On December 13, 2023, the NHTSA opened an investigation into customer complaints of engine failure in the Nissan's KR15DDT and KR20DDET engines, the latter being used in the J55 QX50. The complaints allege engine failure, loss of motive power, engine knock, or noise and/or metal chunks and shavings being found in the oil pan of vehicles with these engines. The cause appears to be seizures and damages to the main bearings and L-links. Nissan stated that they are attempting to address these failures by changing their manufacturing process.

=== Safety ===
==== QX50 ====
The 2020 QX50 was tested by the Insurance Institute for Highway Safety.

IIHS scores
Moderate overlap front	Good	
Side (original test)	Good	
Headlights	Acceptable / Marginal	varies by trim/option
Front crash prevention (Vehicle-to-Vehicle)	Superior	

==== QX55 ====
The 2022 QX55 was tested by the Insurance Institute for Highway Safety.

IIHS scores
Moderate overlap front	Good

== Sales ==
Calendar year	QX50			QX55		
Calendar year	US	Canada	China	US	Canada	China
2015	5,468	2,283		—	—	—
2016	16,973	2,326		—	—	—
2017	16,857	1,812		—	—	—
2018	25,389	2,881		—	—	—
2019	18,616	3,515		—	—	—
2020	20,885	1,897		—	—	—
2021	19,195	2,158				—
2022	11,105	1,183		5,106	728	—
2023	9,941	812	2,298	5,418	501	—
2024	10,722	800	440	3,721	320	336
2025	5,901	2,200	446	2,288	345	158
