= V9X engine =

Renault-Nissan V9X engine
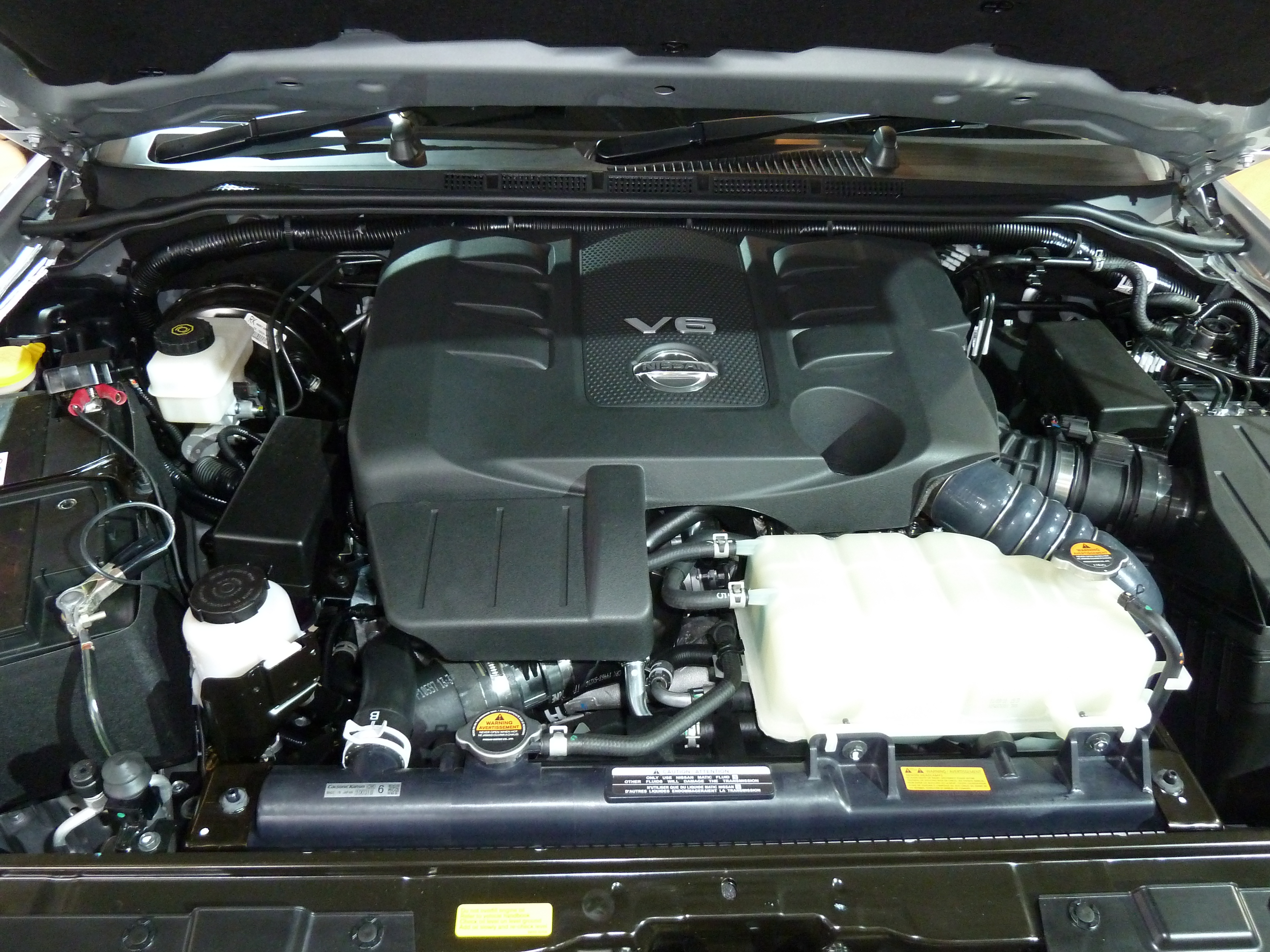
- V9X engine in a 2010 Nissan Pathfinder

Overview
- Manufacturer: Renault-Nissan
- Production: 2009-2017

Layout
- Configuration: 65° V6
- Displacement: 3.0 L (2,993 cc; 182.6 cu in)
- Cylinder bore: 84 mm (3.31 in)
- Piston stroke: 90 mm (3.54 in)
- Valvetrain: DOHC
- Compression ratio: 16.0:1

RPM range
- Idle speed: 650

Combustion
- Turbocharger: Single with intercooler
- Fuel system: Common rail Direct injection (dCi)
- Management: Bosch
- Fuel type: Diesel
- Cooling system: Water-cooled

Output
- Power output: 170 kW (231 PS; 228 hp)
- Specific power: 56.8 kW (77.2 PS; 76.2 hp) per litre
- Torque output: 550 N⋅m (406 lb⋅ft)

The V9X is a common rail 65 degree V6 24-valve DOHC turbo-diesel developed by the Renault-Nissan Alliance, and first installed in the Renault Laguna in 2009. It was subsequently made available for both longitudinal-engine vehicles including Nissan Pathfinder, Nissan Navara, Infiniti FX, Infiniti EX, and Infiniti M and transverse-engine vehicles including Renault Latitude and Laguna Coupé. The v9x engine is based on the p9x engine. It was the first diesel engine installed in any Infiniti automobiles, seen as a necessity as that brand attempted to enter the European market.

== Engine power and combustion ==
The V9X V6 diesel engine develops 170 kW (231 PS; 228 hp) and 550 N⋅m (406 lb⋅ft) of torque. Peak torque is achieved from as low as 1,750 rpm to 2,500 rpm, with 500 N⋅m (369 lb⋅ft) available from 1,500 rpm. Idle speed is 650 rpm.

The engine has a single turbocharger located within the vee of the engine, fed from both banks and is equipped with an intercooler and Bosch Common rail fuel injection. This system incorporates piezo injectors and operates at 1,800 bar (26,000 psi). The combustion chamber design was optimized to improve the balance between emission levels and fuel efficiency; the compression ratio is 16.0:1.

== Emissions and fuel consumption ==
When fitted to the Infiniti EX30d, the V9X engine emits 224 g (7.9 oz)/km of CO_{2} and returns a combined fuel figure of 8.4 L/100 km (34 mpg_{‑imp}; 28 mpg_{‑US}). When fitted to the Nissan Navara 4x4, it emits 246 g (8.7 oz)/km of CO_{2} and returns a combined fuel figure of 9.6 L/100 km (29 mpg_{‑imp}; 25 mpg_{‑US}).

It is fitted to the following vehicles:

- 2013–2017 Infiniti QX70D
- 2010–2013 Infiniti FX30d
- 2010–2013 Infiniti EX30d
- 2010–2013 Nissan Pathfinder (R51)
- 2010–2015 Nissan Navara (D40)
- 2010–2014 Infiniti M30d
- 2010–2015 Renault Laguna III
- 2010–2015 Renault Latitude

== See also ==
- List of Nissan engines
- Nissan
