= Saab Variable Compression engine =

Saab engine technology concept

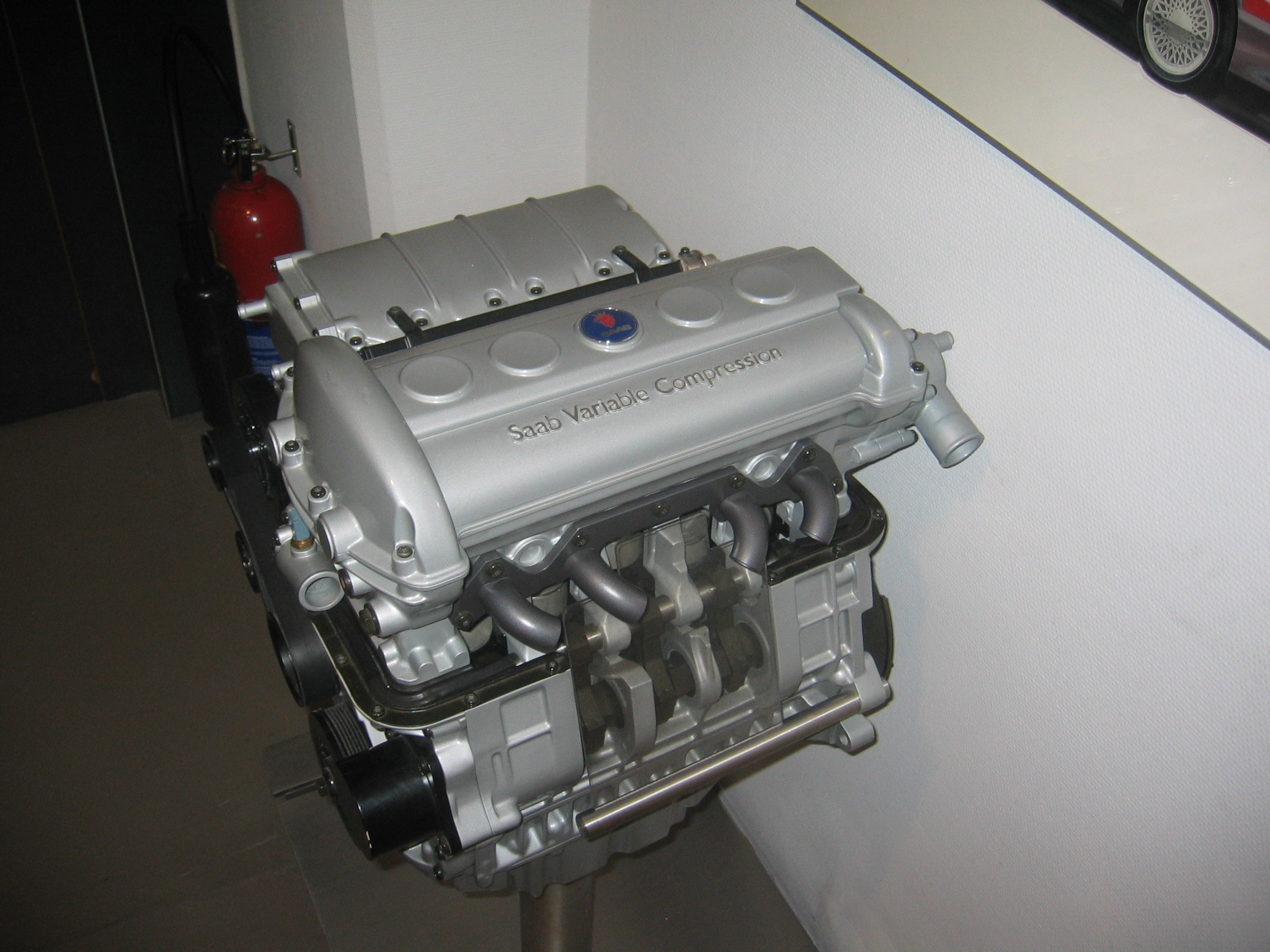
The Saab Variable Compression engine.

The Saab Variable Compression engine was a development project of Saab Automobile, for which it won an award both in 2000 and 2001.

In a normal internal combustion engine, because cylinder bore diameter, piston stroke length and combustion chamber volume are almost always constant, the compression ratio (CR) for a given engine is almost always constant.

One exception is the experimental Saab Variable Compression (SVC) engine, designed for the Saab 9-5. This engine uses a technique that dynamically alters the volume of the combustion chamber, thus changing the compression ratio.

To alter the combustion chamber volume, the SVC 'lowers' the cylinder head closer to the crankshaft. It does this by replacing the typical one-part engine block with a two-part block, with the crankshaft in the lower block and the cylinders in the upper portion. The two blocks are hinged together at one side. By pivoting the upper block around the hinge point, the volume of the combustion chamber can be modified. In practice, the SVC adjusts the upper block through a small range of motion, using a hydraulic actuator. This design was originally patented by Gregory J. Larsen of Lakeland, FL USA.

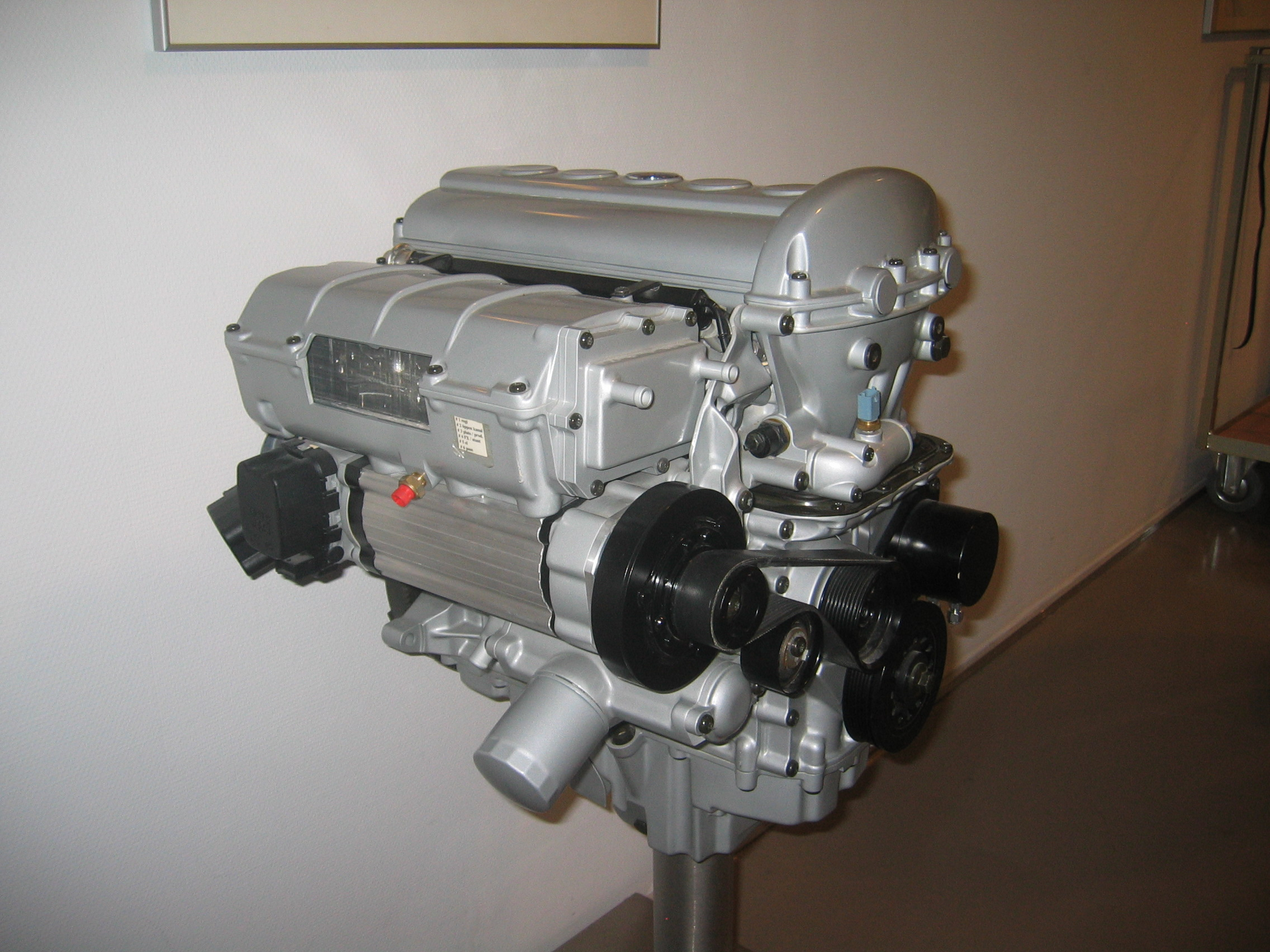
The Saab Variable Compression engine.

The SVC project was shelved by General Motors, when it took over Saab Automobile, due to cost.
