= Nissan MID4 =

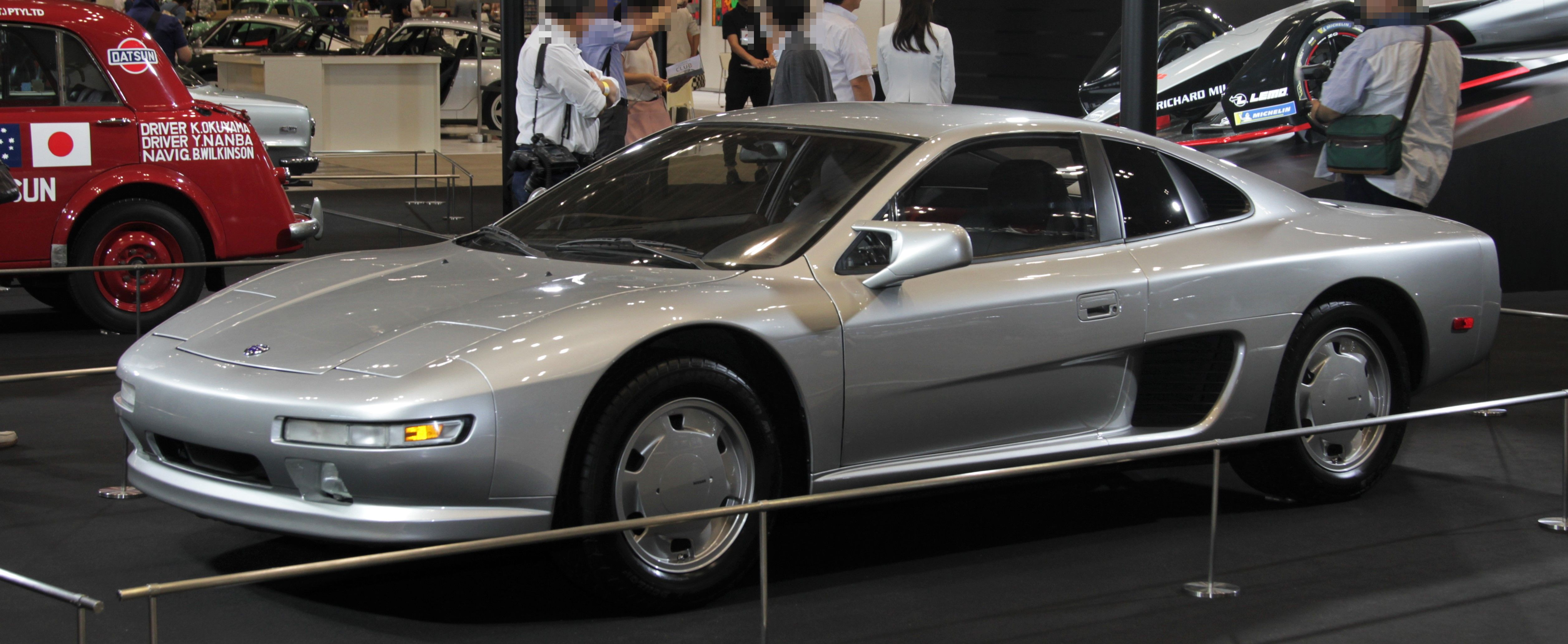
- 1987 Nissan MID4 II

Overview
- Manufacturer: Nissan
- Production: 1985–1987
- Designer: Shinichiro Sakurai

Body and chassis
- Class: Concept car
- Body style: 2-door coupe
- Layout: Mid engine, all-wheel drive

The MID4 was an experimental sports car produced by Nissan.

== History ==
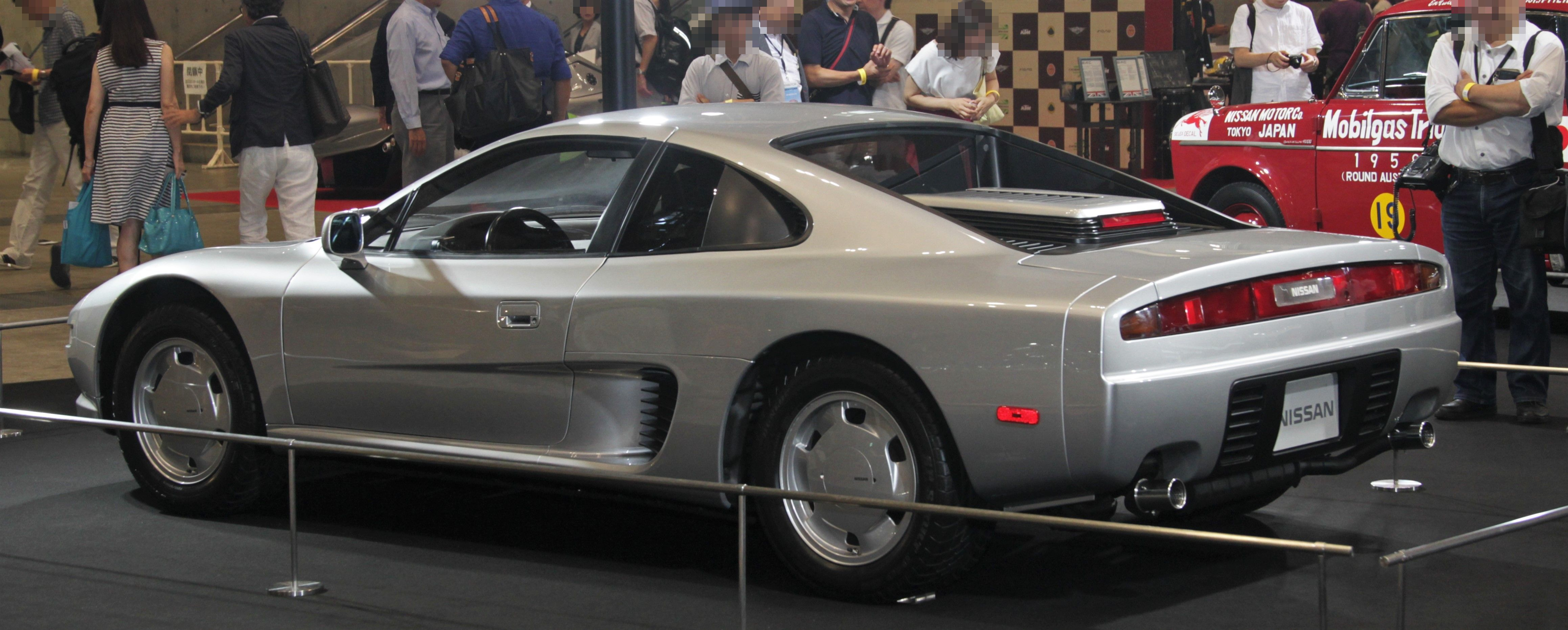
Rear view

First unveiled at the 1985 International Motor Show Germany, the MID4 was a concept car designed by Nissan to originally go on sale in the mid-late 1980s. Nissan had aimed the MID4 to compete with European supercars from Porsche and Ferrari. It featured a mid-engine, all-wheel-drive layout as well as a wide array of technology and features that would eventually find their way into other Nissan production cars. The MID4 was succeeded by the MID4 II, which also did not enter into production.

== Early Development ==
The responsibility of creating the MID4 was given to a team of designers headed by Shinichiro Sakurai in the spring of 1984. The first four prototypes were completed by March 1985.

== MID4 ==
MID4
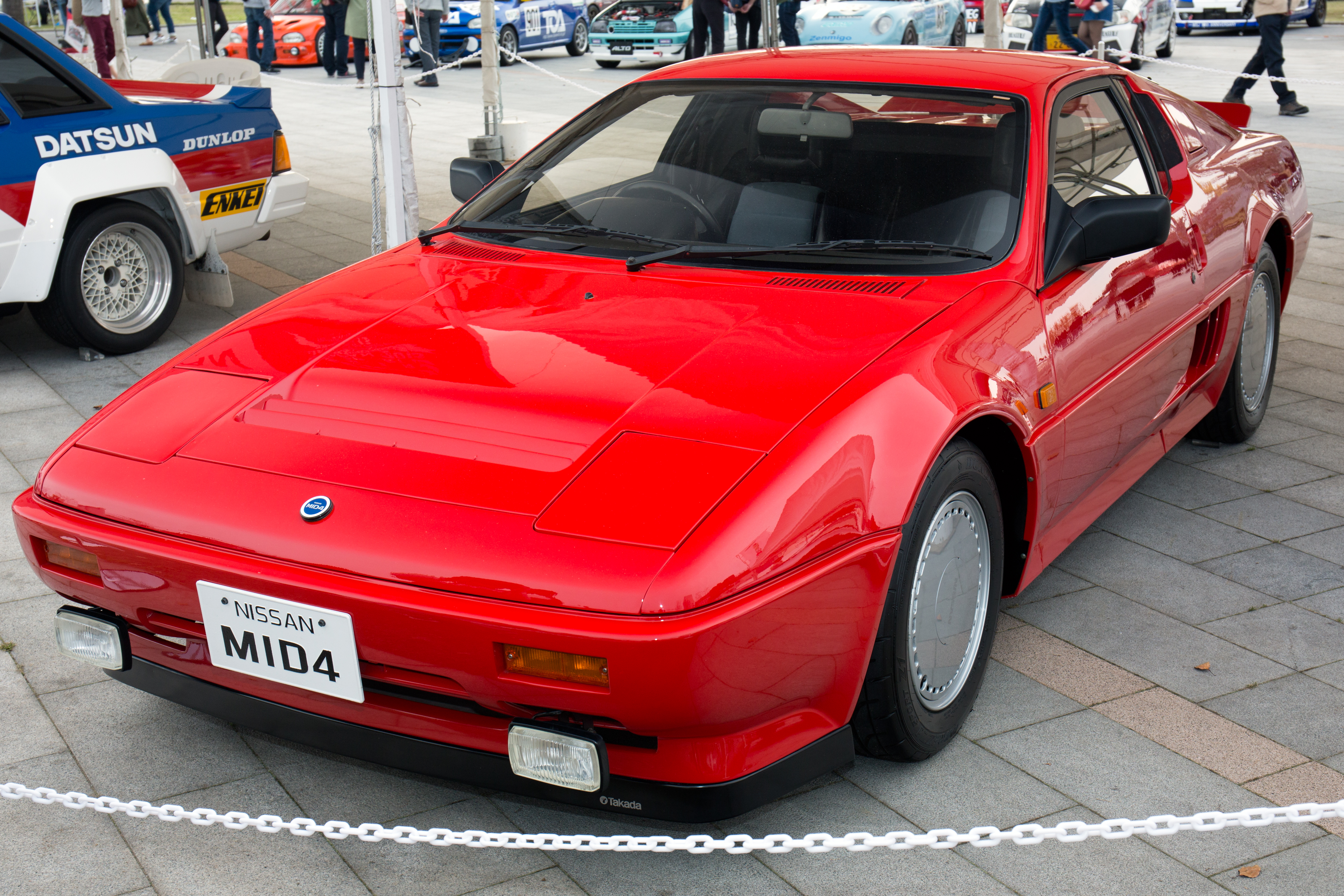

Body and chassis
- Body style: 2-door coupe
- Layout: Transverse, Mid engine, all-wheel drive
- Related: Nissan 300ZX; Nissan Skyline GT-R

Powertrain
- Engine: 2960 cc VG30DE V6
- Transmission: 5-speed manual

Dimensions
- Wheelbase: 2,435 mm (95.9 in)
- Length: 4,150 mm (163.4 in)
- Width: 1,770 mm (69.7 in)
- Height: 1,198 mm (47.2 in)
- Curb weight: 1,230 kg (2,712 lb)

The MID4 was first unveiled at the 1985 Frankfurt Autoshow. The design was inspired by the contemporary mid-engine European sports cars of the time such as the Lotus Esprit and the Ferrari Testarossa. Its all wheel drive system distributed the power from the newly designed VG30DE engine with one third to the front and the remaining two thirds to the rear; it was the predecessor to the ATTESA system. The naturally aspirated V6 engine was rated at 245 PS (242 hp; 180 kW). The MID4 was also the first car to feature Nissan's brand new HICAS four-wheel steering system and had a claimed top speed of 250 km/h (155 mph). A multi-link rear suspension and the double wishbone front suspension were added for better handling. The ATTESA and the HICAS systems would eventually make their way to the Nissan Skyline GT-R in 1989.

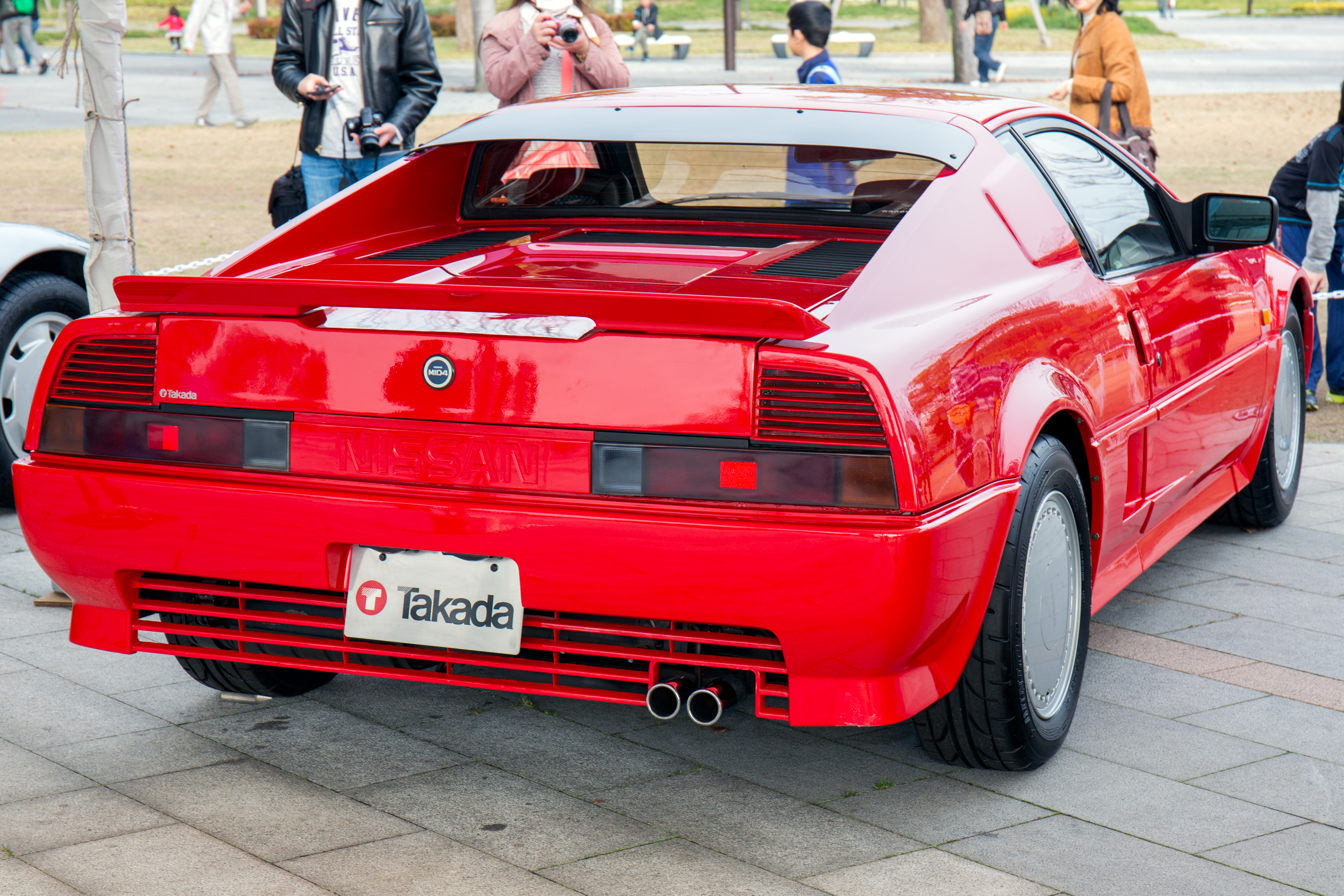
Rear

== MID4-II ==
MID4-II
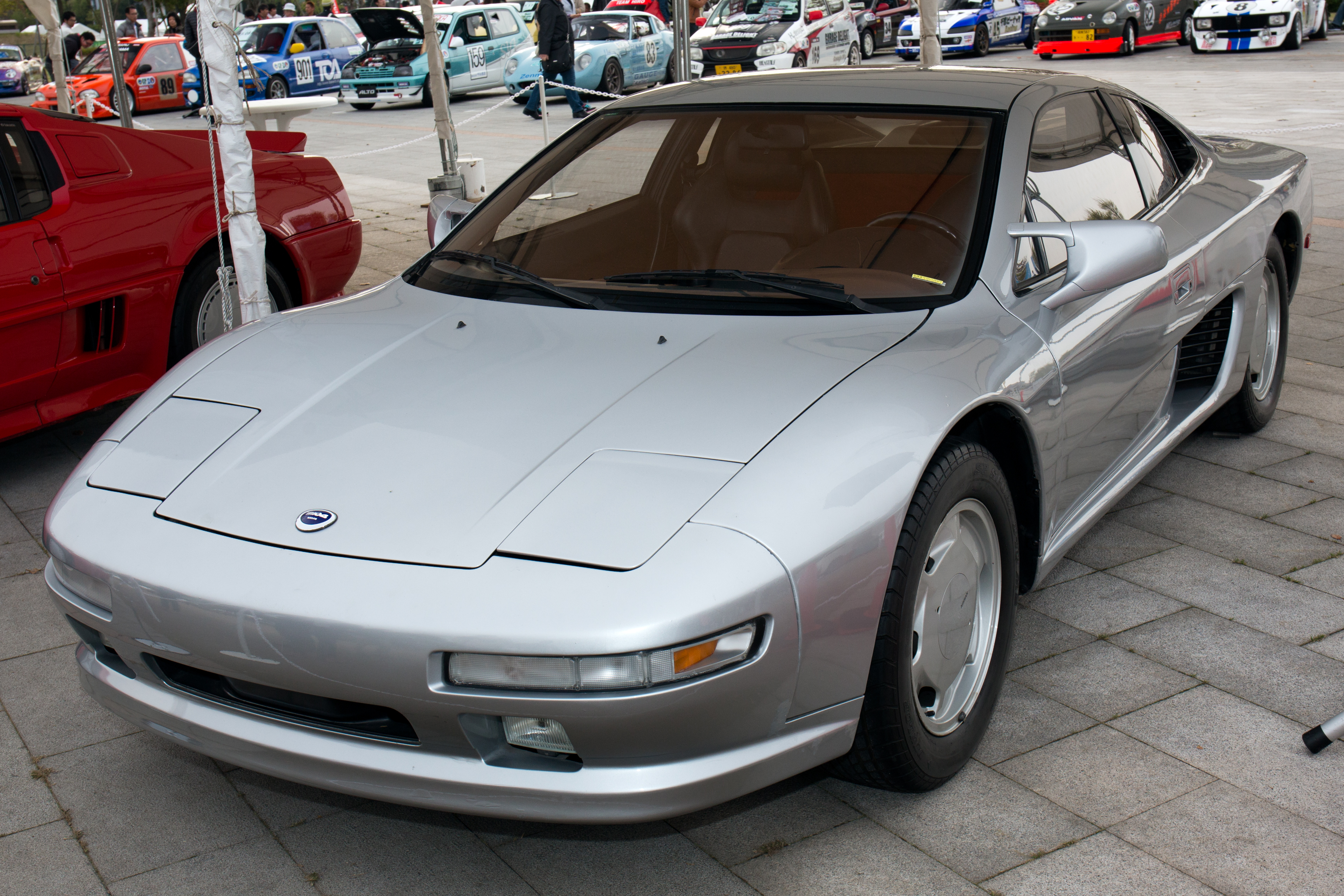

Body and chassis
- Body style: 2-door coupe
- Layout: Longitudinal, Mid engine, all-wheel drive
- Related: Nissan 300ZX; Nissan Skyline GT-R

Powertrain
- Engine: 3.0 L (2,960 cc) VG30DETT V6 twin turbo
- Transmission: 5-speed manual

Dimensions
- Wheelbase: 2,435 mm (95.9 in)
- Length: 4,150 mm (163.4 in)
- Height: 1,198 mm (47.2 in)
- Curb weight: 1,400 kg (3,086 lb)

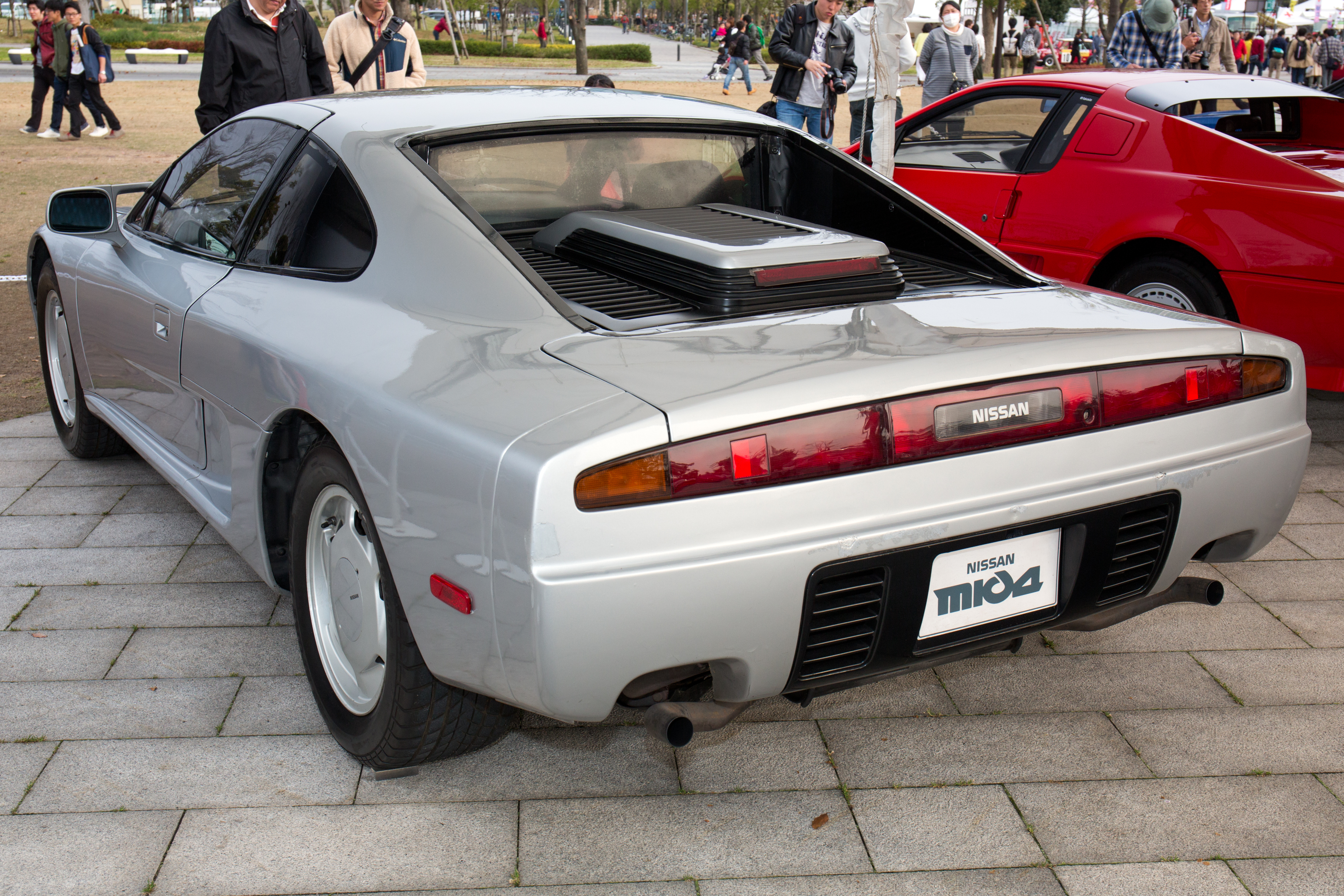
Rear

The MID4-II made its debut at the 1987 Tokyo Motor Show and featured many revisions to the previous design. The most significant change apart from the more finished design, which resembles the later Honda NSX, was the intercooling twin turbocharged VG30DETT which was now rated at 330 PS (243 kW) at 6,800 rpm and 39 kg⋅m (382 N⋅m; 282 lb⋅ft) of torque at 3,200 rpm. The MID4-II was ultimately never produced due to cost. The engine would later make its way in the Nissan 300ZX which debuted in 1989.

== See also ==
- Nissan 300ZX
- Nissan Skyline GT-R (R32)
- ATTESA
- HICAS
- Nissan VG engine
