= Infiniti J30 =

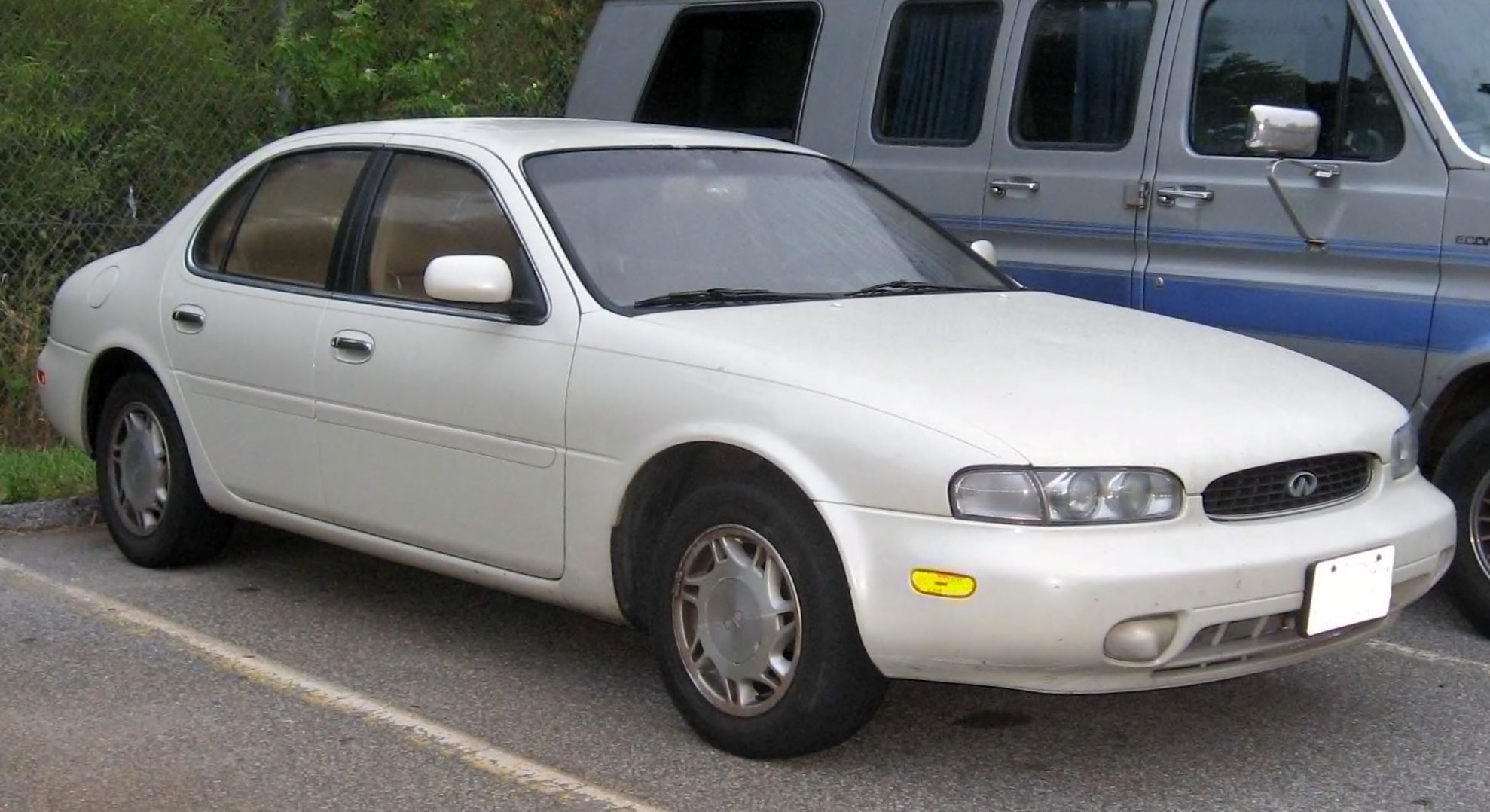

Overview
- Manufacturer: Nissan
- Model code: Y32
- Also called: Nissan Leopard J Ferie
- Production: 1992–1997
- Model years: 1993–1997
- Assembly: Japan: Kaminokawa, Tochigi
- Designer: Doug Wilson (1989)

Body and chassis
- Class: Executive car (E)
- Body style: 4-door sedan
- Layout: FR layout

Powertrain
- Engine: 3.0 L VG30DE V6
- Transmission: 4-speed automatic

Dimensions
- Wheelbase: 108.7 in (2,760 mm)
- Length: 191.4 in (4,862 mm)
- Width: 69.7 in (1,770 mm)
- Height: 54.7 in (1,389 mm)
- Curb weight: 3,580 lb (1,624 kg)

Chronology
- Predecessor: Infiniti M30
- Successor: Infiniti I30

The Infiniti J30, marketed as the Nissan Leopard J Ferie in Japan, is an executive car. The J30 went into production on April 7, 1992 as a 1993 model to replace the M30 (which was a coupe), and was launched in the United States after its competitors, the Lexus GS and Acura Legend. The car was sold in the mid-size sedan segment between the smaller G20 and the larger Q45, both by size and price. The small interior resulted from its rounded styling uncharacteristic of the crowded executive car class, which is now considered an early variant of a four-door coupé.

== Design ==
=== Exterior styling ===
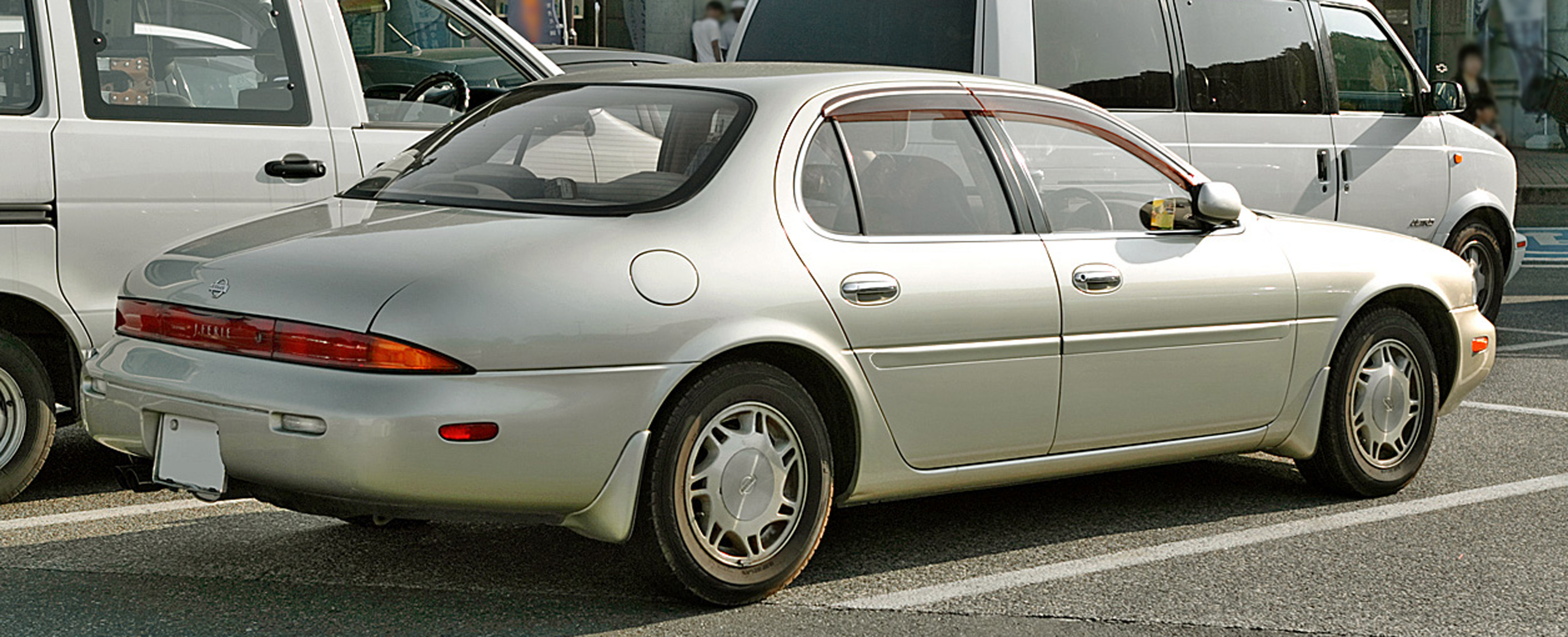
Nissan Leopard J.Ferie (Y32), rear

The J30 was designed at Nissan Design International (NDI) in La Jolla, California under the direction of president Jerry Hirshberg and exterior designer Doug Wilson in 1988-1989. Hirshberg said it was "the first car in what we see as a trend toward breaking away from the long tyranny of the wedge". Design work was frozen in 1989. In a promotional video produced in 1994, it was referred to as a "personal luxury sedan" as attempt to define it as a four-door coupé. The rounded styling resembles the contemporary Nissan Altima/Bluebird U13, also styled at NDI at approximately the same time..

Paul Dean, in a review for the Los Angeles Times, likened the J30 to "a 1961 Jaguar Mark X that melted", adding the "styling magic ... has softened the bulk of a sedan into the visual delicacy of a coupe". Bob Sikorsky drew a parallel to the 1947 Studebaker Champion and was positive about his driving impression, calling the J30 "one of the best-engineered cars in the world today ... a paragon of smoothness and silence with a remarkable balance between cornering ability and straight-ahead highway cruising". At the launch event, held at the Waldorf-Astoria hotel, Hirshberg presented the design theme as "a bold, calligraphic sketch of a line and an egg" and noted it was an attempt to grant "instant heritage" to the nascent Infiniti brand. In a retrospective, Mickey Kaus derided the design as "a pretentious fashion statement" with a "massively round, sagging rear end" that was based "on the bottom of a toilet bowl".

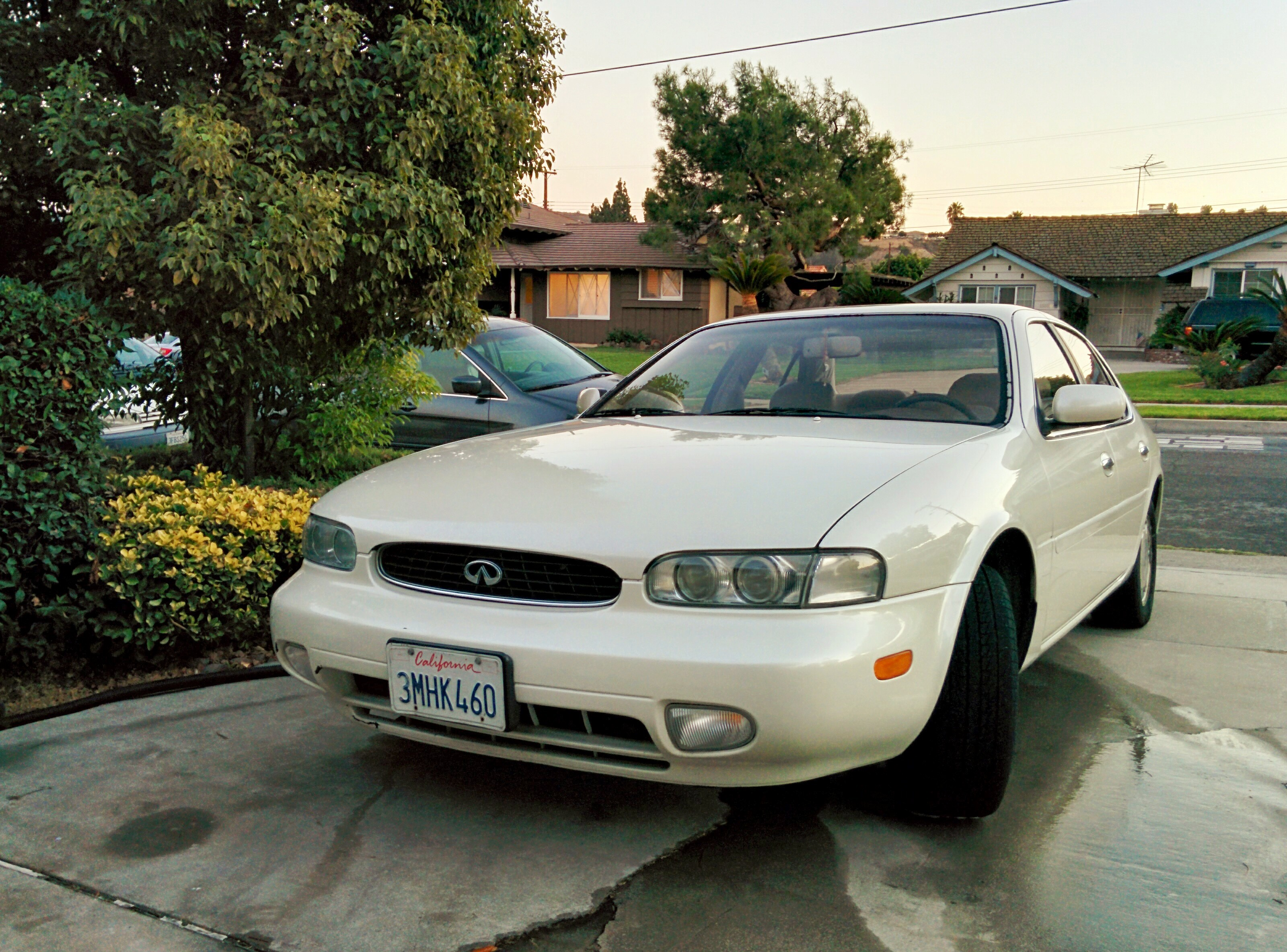
1997 Infiniti J30

=== Interior ===
To establish that this was a luxury vehicle, the interior was largely designed with assistance from Poltrona Frau of Italy, whom they had previously worked with on the larger Q45. The J30 was packaged with a long list of standard features including (but not limited to) a leather interior; bronze tinted exterior glass; digital climate control; real burlwood trim surrounding the climate control unit, Bose sound system control module, and front ashtray; a power metal panel sunroof; dual 8-way power heated seats; dual airbags, variable speed sensitive power steering; and three-channel Anti-Lock brakes with ventilated discs front and rear.

The interior treatment continued to use the contrasting arrangement from the larger Q45 with a dark color used for the dashboard, and center console, with a lighter shade color used inside for the seats, interior door panels, headliner, carpet, and carpeted floor mats. The driver's side window controls had an unusual placement in that the drivers window switch was both one-touch express down and double-sized, meaning it was the same width as two conventional window switches towards the top, with the front and rear passenger window switches further down, with the window lockout switch installed next to the front passenger switch, instead of the drivers window switch. The front passenger and rear passenger window switches were thumb activated, installed at the top of the interior door pull handle. Part of the design process included having designers smell interior materials to ensure "it's a total comprehensive experience when you get in this car", according to Hirshberg.

One of the shortcomings of the J30 was its lack of interior room. Despite its exterior mid-size car dimensions, the interior space was comparable to a subcompact; in fact, key interior dimensions were smaller than a Nissan Sentra, due to its sloping roofline and shrunken trunk.

=== Mechanical ===
Power came from a naturally-aspirated 3.0 L VG30DE V6, shared with the contemporary 300ZX (Z32), which produced 210 hp (157 kW) and 192 lb⋅ft (260 N⋅m) of torque as fitted to the J30. Performance was compromised compared to the 300ZX because of the reduced power and increased weight (3,527 lb (1,600 kg) for the J30, approximately 300 lb (140 kg) more than the 300ZX); as-tested in 1992, the car achieved a top speed of 128 mph (206 km/h) and accelerated from 0–60 mph (97 km/h) in approximately 9 seconds. In addition, to achieve smoother shifts, the engine valve timing was retarded slightly. Fuel consumption was nearly the same as the larger Q45; Natural Resources Canada rated the J30 at 13 / 9.3 L/100 km (22 / 30 mpg_{‑imp}; 18 / 25 mpg_{‑US}) City/Highway, compared with corresponding 14 / 10 L/100 km (20 / 28 mpg_{‑imp}; 17 / 24 mpg_{‑US}) ratings for the Q45. The EPA rated the combined (mixed city and highway driving) fuel consumption of the J30 and Q45 at 20 and 19 mpg_{‑US} (11.8 and 12.4 L/100 km), respectively, for the 1993 model year.

It shares the Y32 Chassis with the Nissan Cedric/Cima/Gloria. The chassis used a MacPherson strut front suspension with a multi-link suspension for the rear wheels, equipped with a viscous limited-slip differential and an anti-lock braking system with ventilated disc brakes front and rear. The J30 was rebadged and marketed in Japan as the Leopard J. Ferie (for jour ferie, meaning 'holiday' in French), where it was offered with both the VG30DE (as the Type L) and VH41DE V8 (Type X). With either engine, the Y32 was exclusively fitted with a four-speed automatic transmission.

=== Touring model ===
Rear view of the Infiniti J30t (Touring), distinguished by the rear spoiler and upgraded wheels.

Infiniti also produced a touring model, the J30t. This model featured a rear spoiler, firmer suspension, BBS-style alloy wheels, and Super HICAS; Nissan's four wheel steering technology. Super HICAS was only available in 1993 and 1994 J30t models. For 1993 and 1994, Nissan offered a very limited number of "gold package" J30t's. These cars had gold plated badging, front grille, antenna and door handles; gold Infiniti logo BBS wheels, upgraded wood interior, and upgraded heated front leather seats with embossed logos. Starting with the 1995 model year, Infiniti "decontented" J30t models due to parent Nissan's financial issues. They weren't as luxurious as earlier models. The "t" model essentially became a base J30 with a spoiler.

== History ==
In the United States, Infiniti unveiled the J30 in Chicago on February 5, 1992. By early March, prices were set at $30,000 and $34,700 for the 1993 model year J30 and J30t, respectively; there were no available options and the first cars were scheduled to be in dealer showrooms by the end of the month. The car launched at $33,000 for the base and $34,700 for the touring models; by 1995, the base model had risen to $39,000, and the J30t was $2,000 more.

The J30 remained nearly unchanged through its production period. Heated seats became standard equipment in the 1994 model year. For 1995, the J30 received subtle vertical ribbing in the tail light lenses, an automatically-dimming rear view mirror, and a power lumbar support control for the driver's seat; in '96 the diagnostic system was upgraded to OBD-II. Otherwise, the J30 received only minor alterations between 1993 and 1997 model years.

All J30s were built in Tochigi, Tochigi, Japan. Over its lifetime, approximately 70,000 were sold in the United States (more than 20,000 per year for 1993 and 1994; 17,899 in 1995; 7,564 in 1996; and 4,594 in 1997) and less than 8,000 were sold in Japan. Production of the J30 ended on June 18, 1997, replaced by the Infiniti I30 (introduced in 1996).

== Marketing ==
Unlike earlier Infinitis, the J30 received effective advertisement with jazz music and artistic camera shots. The J30 was launched with an ad campaign featuring Welsh actor Jonathan Pryce as the spokesman. Infiniti's chief competitors in the Japanese-American luxury car market, Acura and Lexus, used a similar technique in their commercials, which have also featured celebrity voice-overs, done by James Sloyan (Lexus) and James Spader (Acura).
