= Nissan VG engine =

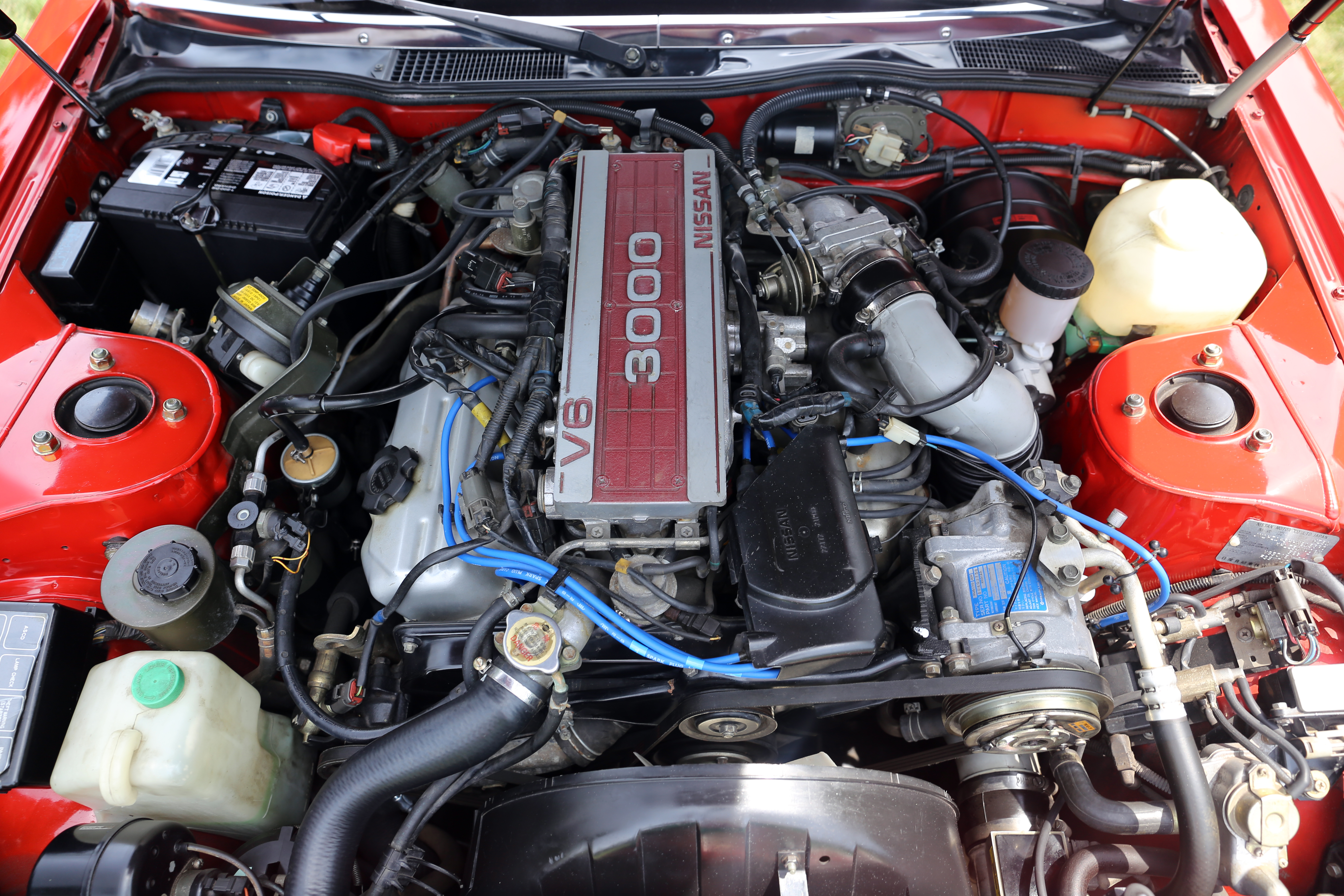
- VG30E engine in a 1987 300ZX GL

Overview
- Manufacturer: Nissan (Nissan Machinery)
- Production: 1983–2004

Layout
- Configuration: 60° V6
- Displacement: 2.0 L; 121.9 cu in (1,998 cc); 3.0 L; 180.6 cu in (2,960 cc); 3.3 L; 199.9 cu in (3,275 cc)
- Cylinder bore: 78 mm (3.07 in); 87 mm (3.43 in); 91.5 mm (3.60 in)
- Piston stroke: 69.7 mm (2.74 in); 83 mm (3.27 in)
- Cylinder block material: Cast iron
- Cylinder head material: Aluminum
- Valvetrain: SOHC 2 valves x cyl. DOHC 4 valves x cyl. with NVTCS
- Valvetrain drive system: Timing belt

Combustion
- Supercharger: Single Eaton Roots-type M62 (2001-2004 VG33ER)
- Turbocharger: Single Garrett T3 (1983–1987 VG30ET; all VG30DET); Single Garrett T25 (1988-1989 VG30ET); Twin Garrett/Mitsubishi T22/TB02 (1989-2000 VG30DETT)
- Fuel type: Gasoline
- Oil system: Wet sump
- Cooling system: Water-cooled

Output
- Power output: 99–330 PS (98–325 hp; 73–243 kW)
- Torque output: 149–388 N⋅m (15–40 kg⋅m; 110–286 lb⋅ft)

Chronology
- Predecessor: Nissan L engine (Straight-six)
- Successor: Nissan VQ engine

The VG engine is a family of V6 engines designed and produced by Nissan between 1983 and 2004.

Japan's first mass-produced V6 engine, the iron block/aluminum head 60° VG engine was produced in displacements between 2.0 and 3.3 liters. Early versions used SOHC cylinder heads with two valves per cylinder; later models featured DOHC cylinder heads, four valves per cylinder, a slightly different engine block and N-VCT, Nissan's own version of variable valve timing, delivering a smoother idle and more torque at low to medium engine speeds.

Both production blocks and head castings were used successfully in the Nissan GTP ZX-Turbo and NPT-90 race cars which won the IMSA GT Championship three years in a row.

== Origins ==
Development of the VG series began in 1979 by Nissan Machinery, a former member of the Nissan Group keiretsu. The objective was to replace the inline 6 L engine, which traces its roots back to the Mercedes-Benz M180 engine introduced in 1951, with an all-new V6 engine.

Nissan engineers wanted the VG to have improved performance, fuel economy, reliability, and refinement, while being both lighter and more compact than its predecessor. The resulting engine was designed from scratch, sharing little to no mechanical components with its predecessor or any other automaker. It was added to a new engine family name PLASMA (Powerful ＆ Economic, Lightweight, Accurate, Silent, Mighty, Advanced).

Extensive computer design techniques were used during development, which made the VG series one of the most advanced and high-tech engines of its day. The VG engine series featured a sequential multi-port fuel injection system, and Nissan's Electronic Concentrated Control System (ECCS).

ECCS used a microprocessor and an oxygen sensor to control fuel delivery, spark timing, exhaust gas recirculation rate, and engine idle speed, depending on the current operating conditions of the engine. This system reduced carbon emissions, improved fuel economy, and improved engine performance during cold-start and warm-up conditions.

The advantages of the VG engine over its inline 6 predecessor was that its V6 configuration would have greater torsional rigidity for higher performance potential, and its shorter length would give Nissan designers and engineers more freedom for vehicle design, allowing for both more frontal crush zone space and transverse mounting for front-wheel-drive vehicles.

All VG engines use a timing belt to synchronize the camshafts with the crankshaft rather than a timing chain. The VG series engine was put into thousands of Nissan vehicles, debuting in Japan in the 1983 Nissan Gloria/Nissan Cedric, and in the US and other markets in the 1984 Nissan 300ZX.

When the VQ engine debuted in 1994, the VG engine was slowly phased out in Nissan cars, and after 2002 it was only available in the Nissan Frontier and Nissan Xterra. The VG engine was retired in 2004, by which time all V6-powered Nissans had switched to the VQ. The last known car to use a VG series engine was the Y31 Nissan Cedric (fleet use only) which used the VG20P engine from 1987 to 2007.

== VG20E ==
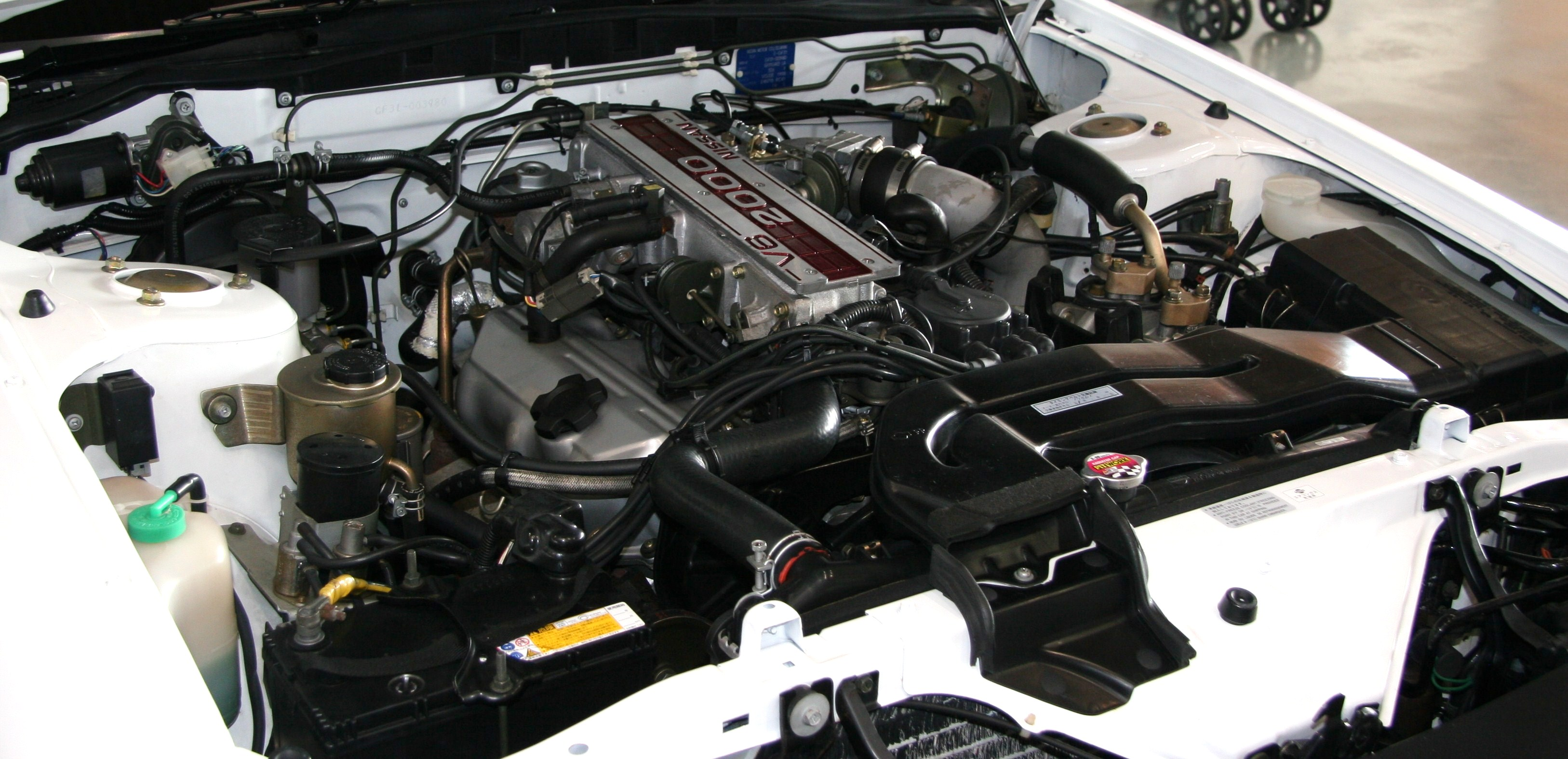
VG20E in a Nissan Leopard

The VG20E is a 1,998 cc (2.0 L) SOHC engine produced from 1983 on. It produces between 115 PS (85 kW; 113 hp) and 125 PS (92 kW; 123 hp) net. In the earlier gross rating system, early eighties' models claim 130 PS (96 kW; 128 hp).

Applications:

- 1983–1987 Nissan Gloria/Nissan Cedric Y30
- 1987–1999 Nissan Gloria/Nissan Cedric Wagon/Van Y30
- 1986–1988 Nissan Bluebird Maxima U11
- 1986–1992 Nissan Leopard F31
- 1987–2002 Nissan Gloria/Nissan Cedric Y31
- 1991–1995 Nissan Gloria/Nissan Cedric Y32
- 1996–2002 Nissan Gloria/Nissan Cedric Y33
- 1997–1999 Nissan Leopard JY33
- 2000–2005 Hongqi Century Star - based on Hongqi CA7180 and 7202 Audi 100 based

== VG20ET ==
The VG20ET was based on the VG20E, but with an added variable-geometry turbocharger. This SOHC motor was introduced after the VG20E in 1984. It was also known as the "Jet Turbo", and came with the F31 Nissan Leopard models XS, and XS-II Grand Selection from 1986 on. It produces 170 hp (127 kW).

Contrary to the VG30ET that came out in the US, the VG20ET came with an intercooler in certain models to push the horsepower output to 155 PS (114 kW; 153 hp), a great jump from the normally aspirated VG20E. The turbo included with the VG20ET had two different settings. At low speeds, the turbo's wastegate would stay closed improving the response at low rpm. At high speeds, the flap would stay open, decreasing resistance and increasing exhaust flow. At its maximum flow, the flap would open at an angle of 27 degrees, while the A/R ranged from 0.21–0.77.

Being that the VG20ET had a short stroke 78 mm × 69.7 mm (3.07 in × 2.74 in), it was thought to have insufficient low end torque. Nevertheless, the VG20ET was a great improvement over the VG20E.

Applications:

- 1984–1989 Nissan 200Z (Z31)
- 1984–1989 Nissan 200ZG (Z31)
- 1984–1989 Nissan 200ZS (Z31)
- 1984–1989 Nissan Laurel Medallist (C32)
- 1986–1988 Nissan Leopard (F31)
- 1984–1990 Nissan Bluebird (PU11)

== VG20DET ==
The VG20DET is an DOHC 1,998 cc (2.0 L) engine with a ceramic turbocharger and intercooler. It has a bore and a stroke of 78 mm × 69.7 mm (3.07 in × 2.74 in) and produces 210 PS (154 kW; 207 hp). This engine features NVTCS (Nissan's Valve Timing Control System).

Applications:

- 1987–1999 Nissan Gloria/Nissan Cedric (Y31)
- 1988.08–1992.06 Nissan Leopard (F31)

== VG20P ==
The VG20P is the Autogas (Liquified petroleum gas) version of the VG20. It produces 99 PS (73 kW; 98 hp) at 5,600 rpm and 149 N⋅m (110 lb⋅ft) at 2,400 rpm. Later versions (2004–2005) produce 105 PS (77 kW; 104 hp) at 6,000 rpm and 152 N⋅m (112 lb⋅ft) at 2,400 rpm. It is an overhead cam, twelve-valve engine.

Applications:

- 1987–2005 Nissan Cedric Y31

== VG30S ==
The VG30S is a 2,960 cc (3.0 L) SOHC twelve-valve engine with an electronic carburettor which produces 148 PS (109 kW; 146 hp) at 4,800 rpm and 234 N⋅m (173 lb⋅ft) at 3,600 rpm. This engine was mainly offered in export markets with more lenient environmental regulations, such as the Middle East and Africa.

Applications:

- Nissan Cedric Y31
- Nissan Laurel C32

== VG30i ==
The VG30i is a 2,960 cc (3.0 L) engine produced from 1986 through 1989. It features a throttle body fuel injection system. It has a long crank snout, a cylinder head temperature sensor positioned behind the timing belt cover, and a knock sensor in the cylinder valley (on California models only). It produces 140 PS (103 kW; 138 hp) at 4,800 rpm and 226 N⋅m (167 lb⋅ft) at 2,800 rpm.

Applications:

- 1986–1989 D21 Hardbody Truck
- 1986–1989 Nissan Pathfinder/Nissan Terrano

== VG30E ==
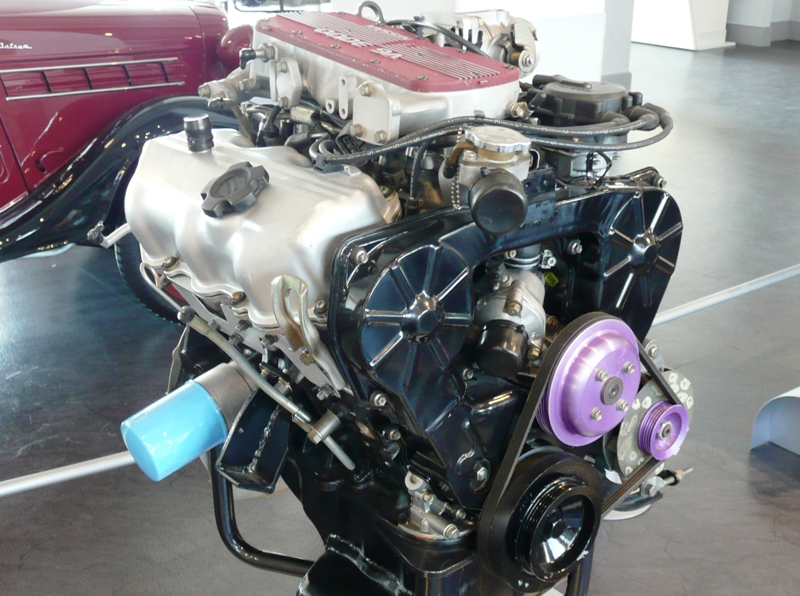
VG30E

The 2,960 cc (3.0 L) VG30E produced 153 hp (114 kW) and 182 lb⋅ft (247 N⋅m). Bore and stroke is 87 mm × 83 mm (3.43 in × 3.27 in). In the 300ZX, it produced 160 hp (119 kW) and 173 lb⋅ft (235 N⋅m) of torque. In April 1987 the "W" series VG30 was released, adding 5 horsepower but leaving torque unchanged. In 1989, the Maxima received the 160 hp (119 kW) rating, but also used a variable intake plenum improving torque to 182 lb⋅ft (247 N⋅m) at 3200 rpm.

Applications:

- 1984–1989 Nissan 300ZX 160 / 165 hp (119 / 123 kW) 9.0:1 compression ratio for NA
- 1984–1989 Nissan Laurel
- 1985–1994 Nissan Maxima 160 hp (119 kW)
- 1987–1988 Nissan 200SX SE
- 1988–1996 Nissan Homy & Caravan series E24
- 1990–1992 Infiniti M30/Nissan Leopard
- 1990–1995 D21 Hardbody Truck
- 1990–1996 Nissan Pathfinder/Nissan Terrano
- 1992–1999 Nissan Gloria/Nissan Cedric 179 hp (133 kW)
- 1993–1998 Nissan Quest/Mercury Villager (modified to become a non-interference design)
- 2004-2006 Derways Cowboy
- Langley Speedway Pro 6

== VG30ET ==
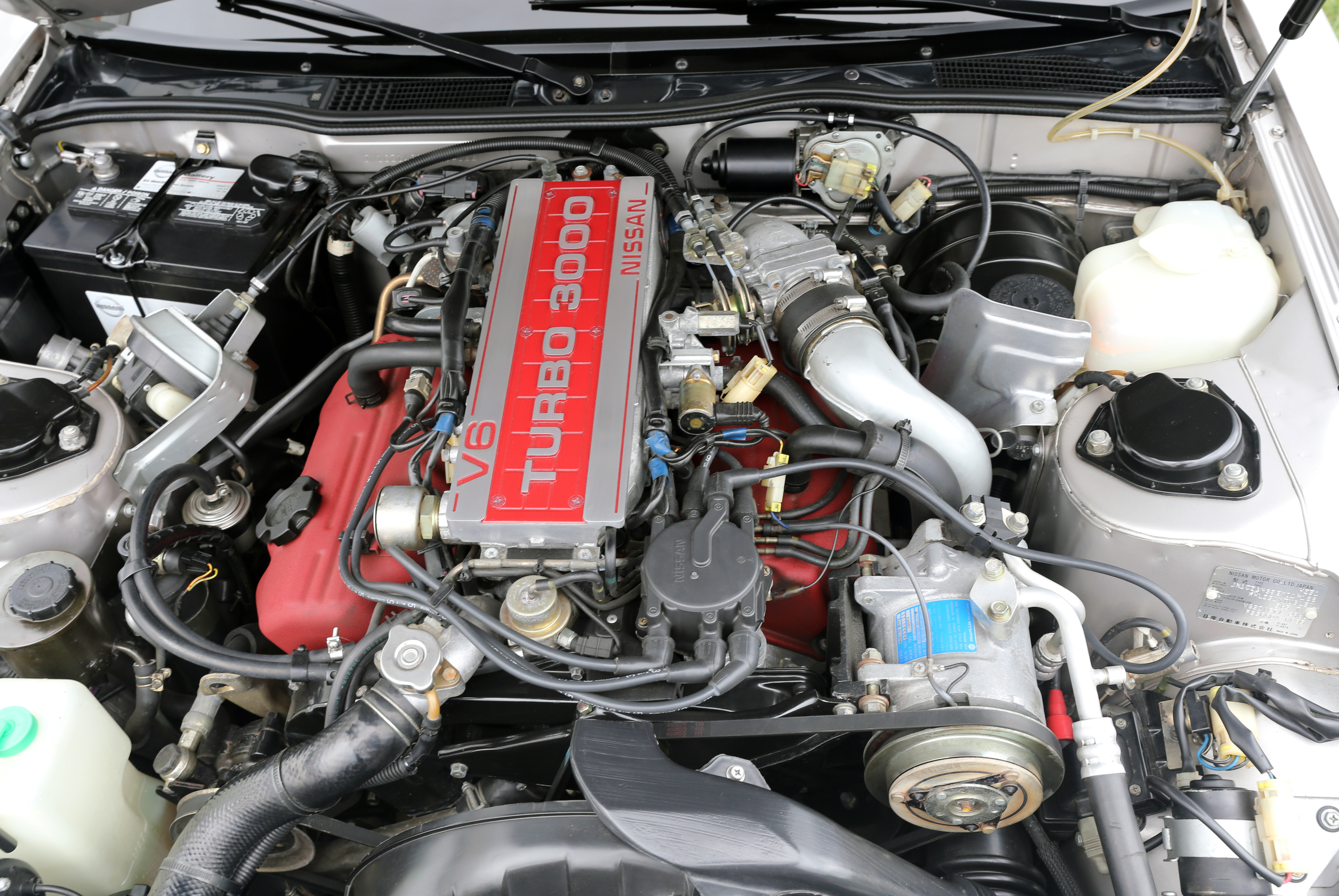
VG30ET in a 1984 300ZX (Z31)

The 2,960 cc (3.0 L) VG30ET was available in early production with a single Garrett T3 turbocharger at 6.8 psi (0.47 bar) and a 7.8:1 compression ratio. The USDM and JDM version produced 200 PS (147 kW; 197 hp) and 227 lb⋅ft (308 N⋅m). European versions produced 230 hp (233 PS; 172 kW) and 252 lb⋅ft (342 N⋅m). When "W"-Series VG30 was released in April 1987, horsepower was increased to 205 PS (151 kW; 202 hp). All 1987 models featured a T3 turbocharger at 6.8 psi (0.47 bar). In 1988 the compression ratio was changed to 8.3:1 and turbocharged with a single Garrett T25 turbocharger at 4.5 psi (0.31 bar) to reduce turbo lag.

The engine specified as the VG30ET engine in the Nissan GTP ZX-Turbo Racecar, was a heavily modified VG30ET producing over 551 kW (749 PS; 739 hp) at 8,000 rpm, and over 686 N⋅m (506 lb⋅ft) at 5,500 rpm.

Applications:

- 1984–1989 Nissan 300ZX Turbo (Z31)
- 1984–1986 Nissan Leopard F30
- 1984–1991 Nissan Cedric/Nissan Gloria
- 1985–1990 Nissan GTP ZX-Turbo (non-production)
- 1986 Nissan R86V Racecar (non-production)

== VG30DE ==
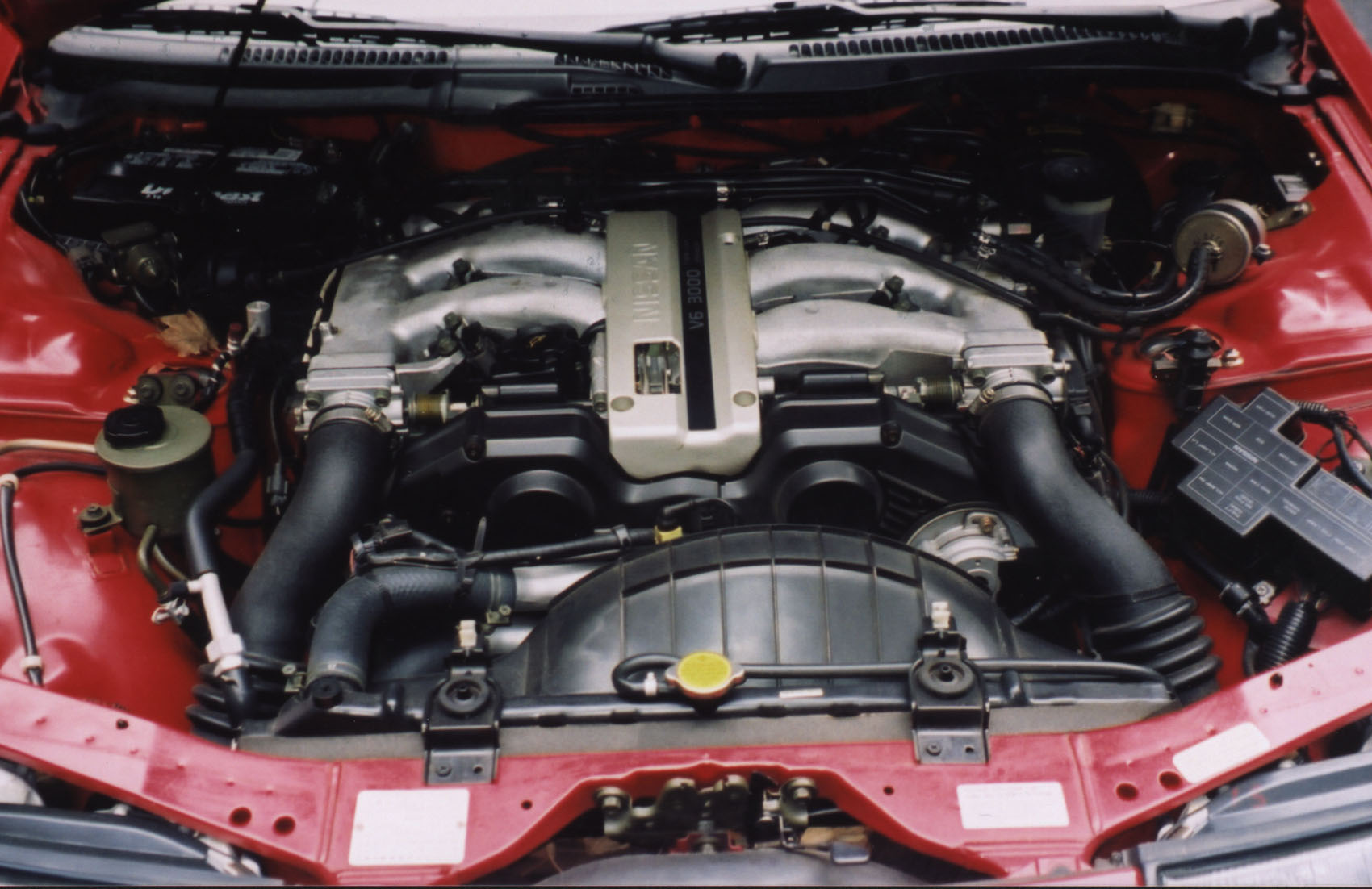
VG30DE

The 2,960 cc (3.0 L) DOHC 24-valve VG30DE produces 190 to 222 hp (142 to 166 kW) and 198 lb⋅ft (268 N⋅m). Bore and stroke is 87 mm × 83 mm (3.43 in × 3.27 in). Original Japanese market units claimed 185 PS (136 kW).

There were two versions of the VG30DE. The first was introduced in 1986 and was never sold in North America or other countries, and was exclusively offered on the Japanese 300ZR (Z31) and Nissan Leopard F31. The second was introduced in 1989, this time being sold outside of Japan and into North America and other countries in the 300ZX (Z32) and the Japan-only Cima. The first VG30DE engine was originally developed for the 1985 MID4 concept. The VG30DE has two throttle bodies facing the front of the vehicle (Nissan 300ZX and Fairlady Z) or two throttle bodies to the left (sedans and 300ZR). It was also installed with N-VCT, an early form of variable valve timing.

Early VG30DEs used large oval intake ports, and round exhaust ports, though the flange was similar to the SOHC VG engine, bolt spacing was slightly different. Late VG30DE's used slightly smaller oval intake ports, and oval exhaust ports. The bolt spacing was shared with the round-port variant from earlier years.

Applications:

| Years | Model | Power output |
|---|---|---|
| 1985 | Nissan MID4 Concept (non-production) | 242 hp (180 kW; 245 PS) |
| 1986–1989 | Nissan 300ZX Z31 (300ZR only) | 190 hp (142 kW; 193 PS) |
| 1990–1997 | Nissan 300ZX Z32 | 222 hp (166 kW; 225 PS) |
| 1989–2000 | Nissan Fairlady Z Z32 | 222 hp (166 kW; 225 PS) |
| 1986–1992 | Nissan Leopard F31 | 190 hp (142 kW; 193 PS) |
| 1992–1998 | Infiniti J30/Nissan Leopard J Ferie | 210 hp (157 kW; 213 PS) |
| 1992–1995 | Nissan Gloria and Cedric | 190 hp (142 kW; 193 PS) |
| 1989–1991 | Nissan Cima | 190 hp (142 kW; 193 PS) |

== VG30DET ==
The VG30DET is a 3.0 L (2,960 cc), 24-valve, DOHC, VTC-equipped engine equipped with a non-intercooled T3 (Nissan N1 Type) 4-bolt Garrett Turbo running between 7.5 and 11.5 psi (0.52 and 0.79 bar). Generating up to 255 PS (188 kW; 252 hp) and measuring 236 lb⋅ft (320 N⋅m) depending on the production year and application, it was used from 1987 through 1995 in the Japanese market, and is the single-turbo predecessor to the twin-turbo VG30DETT engine.

While this engine is similar to the VG30DE, it used different heads and inlet manifold. Contrary to popular belief, it was not available in the Nissan 300ZR model - the 300ZR only had an early version of the (non-turbo) VG30DE. The engine was available in the Cedric, Gloria, Cima and Leopard chassis.

Applications:

- Nissan Cedric Y32 (1991–1994)
- Nissan Gloria Y32 (1991–1994)
- Nissan Cima FY31, FY32 (1988–1995)
- Nissan Leopard F31
- Autech Zagato Stelvio (based on the F31 Leopard), using a modified version that produces 280 PS (276 bhp; 206 kW) @ 6000 rpm

== VG30DETT ==
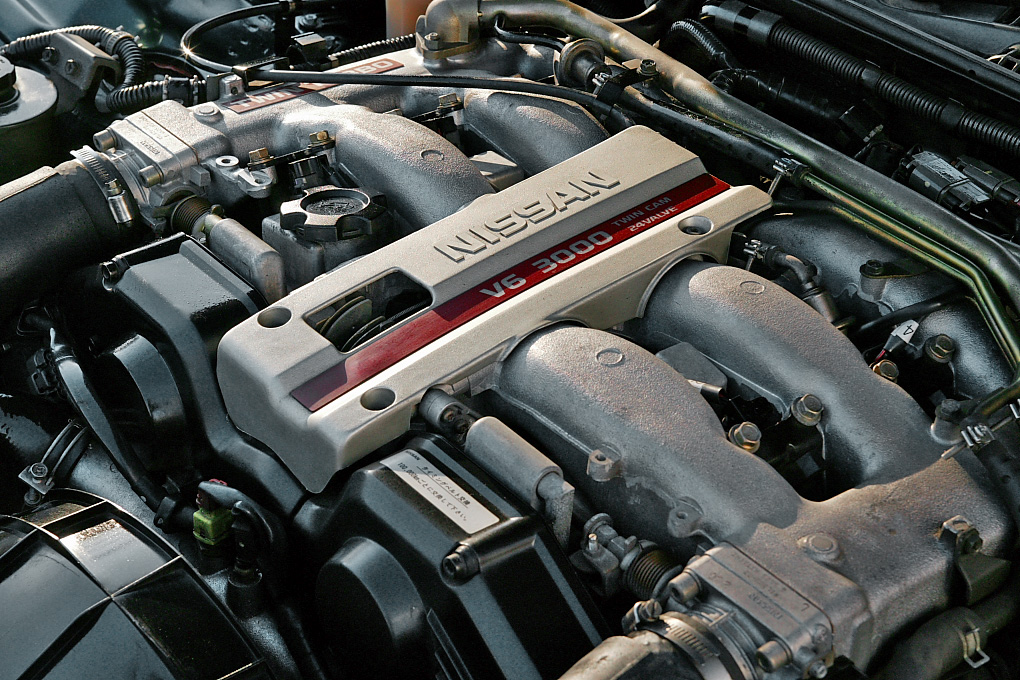
VG30DETT

The VG30DETT is an iron block/aluminum head twin-turbo, twin intercooler 2,960 cc (3.0 L; 180.6 cu in) version first seen in the 1987 MID4-II concept. Producing 330 PS (325 bhp; 243 kW) in the MID-4 and coming in at a weight of 237 kg (523 lb), it was the last of Nissan's DOHC belt-driven 4 valve per cylinder turbocharged engines put into production, following the CA18DET and RB20DET.

The engine's hybrid T22/TB02 twin-turbos were developed exclusively for Nissan, and it came with Nissan's NVTCS valve timing control system).

The production engine as used in the 1989–2000 300ZX (Z32) develops 304 PS (300 bhp; 224 kW) at 6400 rpm and 283 lb⋅ft (384 N⋅m) at 3600 rpm with a five-speed manual transmission, and 284 PS (280 bhp; 209 kW) and 283 lb⋅ft (384 N⋅m) of torque with a four-speed automatic transmission. JDM cars claimed 280 PS (276 bhp; 206 kW), due to a gentlemen's agreement by Japanese automobile manufacturers that was in effect at the time until 2005.

Applications:

- 1987 Nissan MID4-II Concept (non-production)
- 1989–2000 Nissan 300ZX/Fairlady Z32
- 1990–1993 Nissan NPT-90/NPT-91 racecars (non-production)
- 1997 BRM P301 (non-production)

== VG33E ==
The VG33E is a 3,275 cc (3.3 L) cast iron block, aluminum head, SOHC version produced between 1996 and 2004. It has sequential fuel injection, two valves per cylinder with self-adjusting hydraulic followers, forged steel connecting rods, one-piece cast camshafts, and a cast aluminum lower intake manifold, with either a cast aluminum or plastic/composite upper intake manifold plenum.

Bore and stroke are 91.5 mm × 83 mm (3.60 in × 3.27 in). Compression ratio is 8.9:1. Output is 170 or 180 hp (127 or 134 kW) at 4,800 rpm, depending on year/vehicle, with 202 lb⋅ft (274 N⋅m) of torque at 2,800 rpm.

The VG33E was built in Smyrna, Tennessee, and used in SUVs, pickups, and minivans. It reportedly has remained in production in the Nissan Paladin (rebadged as Dongfeng Oting) as an optional engine for the Chinese market until 2015.

Applications:

- 1996–2000 Nissan Pathfinder
- 1996–2004 Nissan Pathfinder In Australian Models
- 2003–2006 Nissan Navara In Australian Models
- 1997–2000 Infiniti QX4
- 1999–2004 Nissan Frontier
- 2000–2004 Nissan Xterra
- 1997–2002 Nissan Elgrand
- 1999–2002 Nissan Quest/Mercury Villager
- 1999–2004 Nissan Paladin

== VG33ER ==
The 3,275 cc (3.3 L) VG33ER is a supercharged version of the VG33 only sold in North America. It produces 210 hp (157 kW) at 4,800 rpm with 246 lb⋅ft (334 N⋅m) of torque at 2,800 rpm.

Applications:

- 2001–2004 Nissan Frontier SC
- 2002–2004 Nissan Xterra SC

== See also ==
- List of Nissan engines
