= Nissan Gobi =

Overview
- Designer: Bruce Campbell (1990)

Body and chassis
- Class: Compact pickup truck (concept)
- Body style: 2-door truck
- Layout: FR layout / F4 layout?
- Related: Nissan Hardbody

The Nissan Gobi was a concept pickup truck designed at Nissan Design International by Bruce Campbell under the leadership of Jerry Hirshberg. It was introduced at the 1990 North American International Auto Show in Detroit.

== Design ==
Bruce Campbell and Diane Allen are separately credited with designing the Gobi concept.

The cab of the Gobi concept was influenced by helicopter design and was laid out asymmetrically with driver-oriented controls. The concept was a styling exercise that was built on a shortened Nissan Hardbody pickup truck platform and could reach showrooms in 18 months, if approved. Hirshberg called it "an economical entry-level vehicle with the excitement of a sports car" although a Nissan spokesman noted it was engendering an enthusiastic reception among "women and young professional people [...] not as much by entry-level buyers."

Storage bins on the Gobi concept were whimsically labeled for "stuff and things" and "odds and ends". The glovebox is removable and can be worn as a backpack when detached, and the sides of the bed fold down to facilitate movement of cargo.

The last showing of the car was in April 1990 at the New York Auto Show. Plans to produce the Gobi were shelved in August 1990 as "production costs would exceed what the consumers would pay." As of 2014 the Gobi concept was stored in the basement of the Lane Motor Museum in Nashville, Tennessee, near Nissan North America headquarters.
