= Nissan NPT-90 =

Motor vehicle

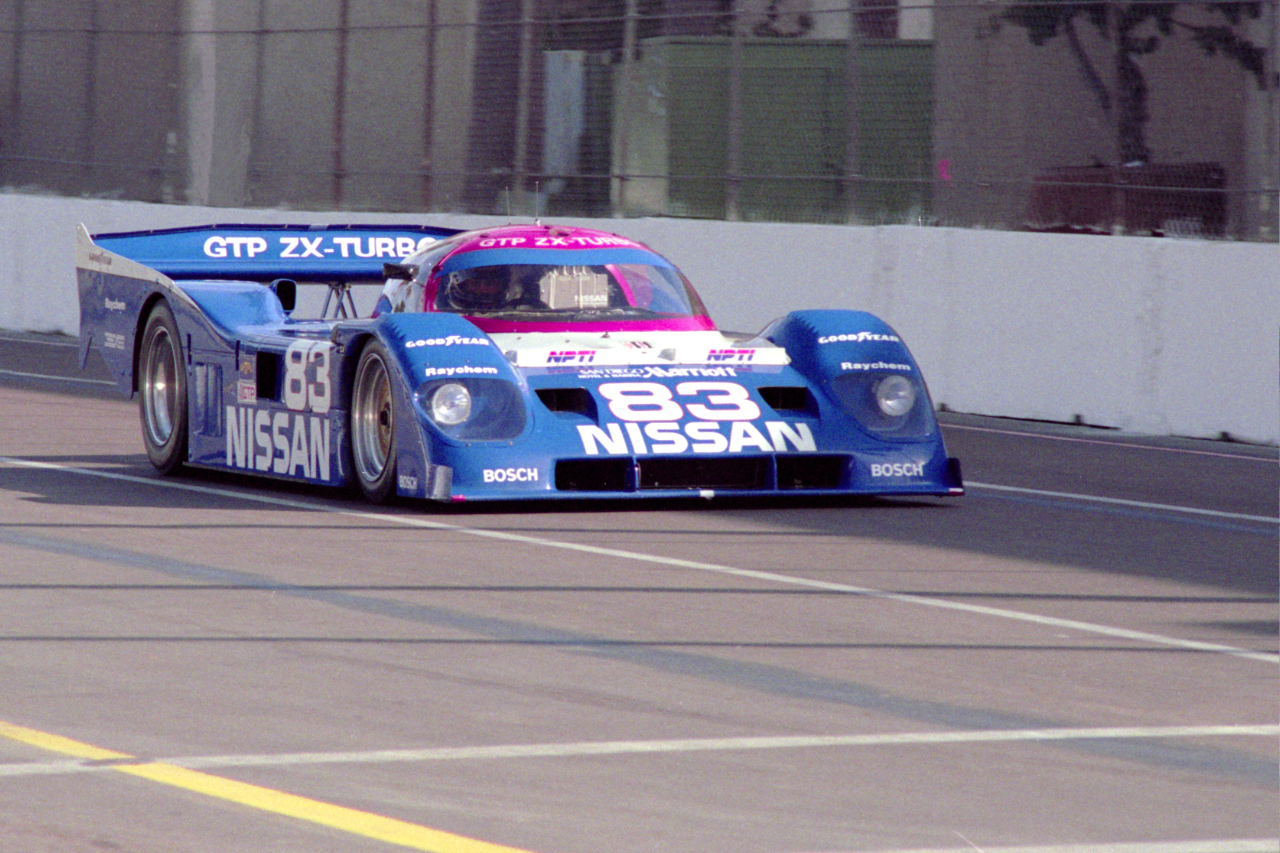
Geoff Brabham's Nissan NPT-90 at the 1990 Grand Prix of Greater San Diego

The Nissan NPT-90 was a racing car developed in 1990 for Nissan Motors by Nissan Performance Technology Incorporated (NPTI), formerly known as Electramotive Engineering. It was a replacement for the highly successful GTP ZX-Turbo that had won the IMSA GT Championship in 1989. The NPT-90 would go on to win the championship in 1990 and 1991 before being retired by Nissan at the end of the 1992 season.

Although officially known as the NPT-90, the car continued to race with the GTP ZX-Turbo naming painted on it. This was an attempt by Nissan to continue to use that name to market for the Nissan 300ZX road car.

== Development ==
Following five years of development and improvement on the GTP ZX-Turbo, Nissan realized that incoming competition from Toyota and Jaguar meant that a new car was needed to be able to continue to defend their championship. NPTI, Nissan's North American motorsports division, was therefore tasked with construction of an all-new car, abandoning the original Lola-based GTP ZX-Turbo chassis. The new car would abandon the angular look of the previous car, with the cockpit being rounded and narrower. The large intakes at the nose of the car would also be replaced with smaller duct work, while large vertical snorkels for the turbocharger would be placed on the sides of the car.

Nissan chose to continue to use the VG30 3.0 litre turbocharged V6 engine that had previously powered the GTP ZX-Turbo, but with improvements to allow for more power output, including the addition of a four-valve head to replace the two-valve design. Eventually, in 1992 Nissan chose to reduce the VG30s displacement to 2.5L in the NPT-91.

The NPT-90 would be upgraded during its life, leading to the cars being renamed NPT-91 in the middle of the 1991 season. Further upgrades during 1992 would come in various specifications, signified as NPT-91A through NPT-91D.

== Racing history ==
=== 1990 ===
While the first NPT-90 chassis were under construction, NPTI began the 1990 season using the older GTP ZX-Turbos. The first chassis would be completed halfway through the season and debut at Topeka where it took an eighth-place finish, behind the second place GTP ZX-Turbo. Although engine problems at Lime Rock Park would put the lone NPT-90 out of the race, it would quickly show its potential at the next round at Mid-Ohio by taking the race win. With a second victory at Watkins Glen, and the second chassis completed, the NPT-90s would completely take over from the GTP ZX-Turbos.

Over the rest of the season, the NPT-90 would only be able to secure one more win at Road America, but the strong points finishes of both cars as well as the success of the GTP ZX-Turbos earlier in the season would allow Nissan to take the constructors championship for the second year in a row. Geoff Brabham would secure his third straight drivers championship as well.

=== 1991 ===
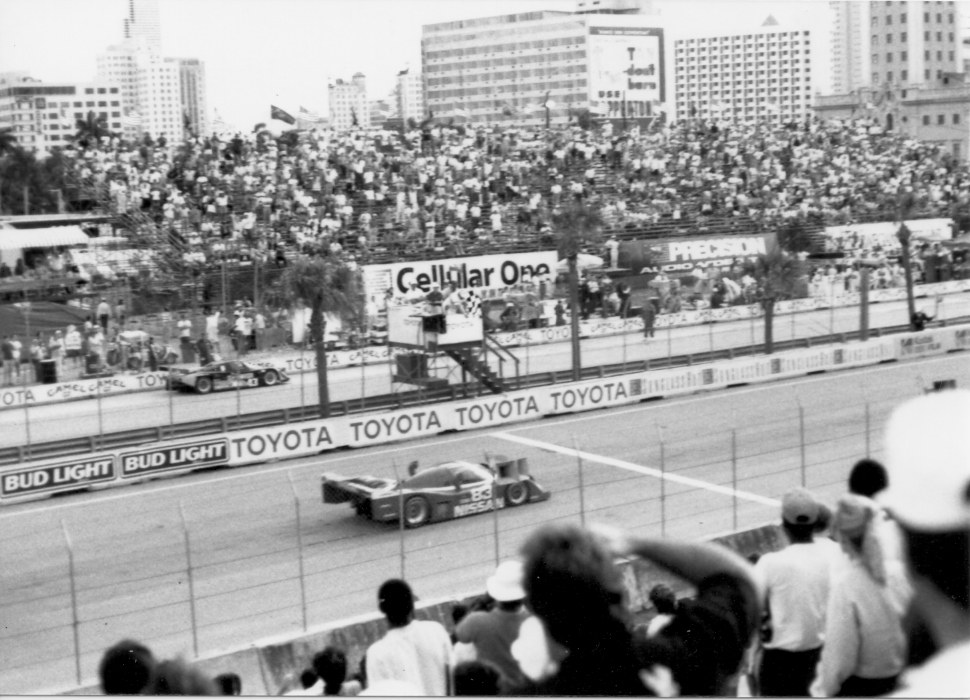
A victory at Miami by Geoff Brabham in the NPT-91

To open the 1991 season, Nissan returned to their practice of skipping the endurance 24 Hours of Daytona due to the more sprint-oriented design of the NPT-90. However, unlike previous years, Nissan would bring some Nissan R90CKs from Europe to participate, aiding in the points championship. However the NPT-90s were used for the 12 Hours of Sebring, in which Nissan successfully took the top two spots. However shorter events began to see Jaguar's pace overwhelming the Nissans, with their cars taking three straight victories before the upgraded NPT-91 could take wins in Topeka and Lime Rock. However Jaguar began to reclaim victories, while Toyota and the privateer Intrepid would take race wins as well.

Even with running three cars in a race at times, the upgraded NPT-91s would be unable to score another victory for the rest of the season. However, as before, consistent points finishes during the season were able to overcome the problems that Jaguar and Toyota experienced in some events, allowing Nissan to take a third successive constructors championship. Geoff Brabham would take his fourth drivers championship, beating teammate Chip Robinson by a mere five points.

=== 1992 ===
Once again skipping the 24 Hours of Daytona, the Nissan team was able to be boosted by the Japanese Nissan R91CP taking overall victory. This triumph was continued as the NPT-91s made their debut in Miami, also securing a race win. However Nissan would not be able to score their third successive Sebring victory, as Toyota beat them by a sizable five laps. Unfortunately this trend would continue as the season progressed, with the NPT-91s suffering from heavy accidents and various mechanical woes that prevented them from finishing.

The season's lowest point came at the Road Atlanta race, where tire failures led to a pair of massive crashes that destroyed two NPT-91 chassis. Neither Chip Robinson nor Geoff Brabham were seriously injured, but team manager Trevor Harris later said, “We never really recovered from that weekend.”

Even with the addition of the twin-turbocharged C-spec NPT-91 to the line-up midway through the season, the NPTI team would continue to struggle. The team would find also themselves struggling with funding as well, leaving only a lone NPT-91 to compete. No more victories would be scored that season, leaving Nissan to settle for a distant second in the constructors championship behind Toyota. Geoff Brabham would manage a mere third in the drivers championship.

=== 1993 ===
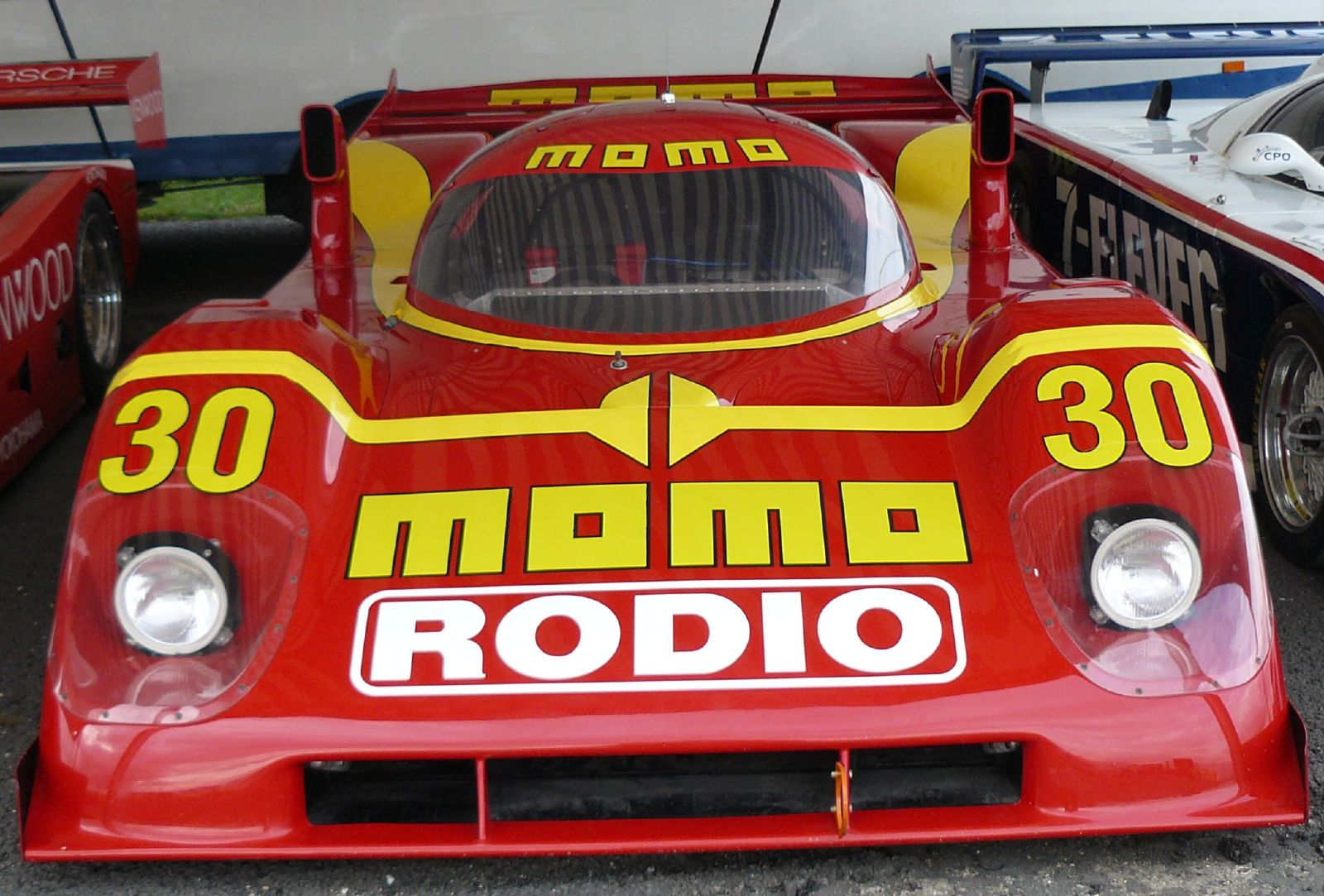
Momo Racing's privateer NPT-90

Following the 1992 season, Nissan began plans for the construction of a new competitor to replace the NPT-90 series. Work began on modifying the already abandoned P35 project to comply with IMSA's GTP rules. However IMSA announced their intentions to abandon the GTP class in 1994, leading Nissan to abandon the new car once again, now renamed NPT-93. Nissan chose to instead concentrate on their 240SX and 300ZX efforts in the production-based IMSA classes.

Not deterred by the withdrawal of the factory effort, Gianpiero Moretti of the Momo company leased two original specification NPT-90s for use in the full 1993 season. Chassis number 90-05 was used for the whole championship for Derek Bell and Moretti himself while the car that had chassis number 90-03 was used as the spare car, and raced only at the Miami Grand Prix as the second car, driven by Massimo Sigala. The car had some strong performances, including a second at the 12 Hours of Sebring and third at Mid-Ohio. Momo's lone effort would allow Nissan to take third in the constructors championship, while Gianpiero Moretti himself would take third in the drivers championship. With the abandonment of the GTP class, the NPT-90s would be retired from IMSA GTP racing.

=== 1996 ===
An NPT-90 with chassis number 90-03 (the ex-Moretti spare car chassis from 1993) was entered by Pegasus Racing in the 1996 24 Hours of Daytona. The chassis was lightly modified to comply with IMSA's WSC regulations, so the roof was removed and a BMW V12 engine was fitted. The car started the race but didn't finish, retiring with an alternator failure after 86 laps, and was classified 67th overall and 13th in class. The car was driven by Juan Carlos Carbonell, Jim Briody and Jon Field.

Later in the season Jacobs Motorsports would attempt to run Michael Jacobs in the Pegasus NPTI on two occasions, (the 6 Hours of Watkins Glen and the Daytona Finale), but neither entry amounted to anything.
