= Jerry Hirshberg =

American automotive designer (1939–2019)

- Born: Gerald Paul Hirshberg; July 1, 1939; Cleveland, Ohio, U.S.
- Died: November 10, 2019 (aged 80); San Diego, California, U.S.
- Other name: Jerry Paul
- Occupations: Lead designer, Nissan Design International, 1980–2000
- Known for: Automotive and industrial design
- Website: Official website

Gerald Paul Hirshberg (July 1, 1939 – November 10, 2019) was an American automotive designer, industrial designer, musician and painter.

== Early life and education ==
Hirshberg studied mechanical engineering at Ohio State University and received a degree with honors in Design from the Cleveland Institute of Art. After graduation, he continued to study in Europe on a Mary C. Page Fellowship. During college, under the stage name Jerry Paul, he released the hit single "Sparkling Blue" in 1959 and opened for well-known musicians such as Bobby Rydell, Fabian, and Frankie Avalon. Hirshberg's first automobile was a Volkswagen Beetle.

== Automotive design ==
Hirshberg started his career in automotive design with General Motors in 1964, where he created designs for the Pontiac and Buick divisions under Bill Mitchell, notably the 1971 "boattail" Buick Riviera, where he interpreted Mitchell's original concept. By the time he departed GM, he was the Buick/Pontiac chief designer. Regarding his time at GM, Hirshberg recalled in 1999 that "[the car design trend] was certainly sexual, but it was the sexual fantasies of men. When we lapsed, we were doing design pornography."

In 1980, Hirshberg left GM after being recruited to join Nissan, where he served as the founding director and eventual President of their first design studio in the United States, Nissan Design International (NDI), based in La Jolla, California. In 1982, NDI had thirty employees, which Hirshberg called an "experiment in intercultural creativity." NDI, along with Toyota's Calty studio, were some of the earliest California-based automotive design studios established by foreign and domestic manufacturers throughout the 1970s and 80s.

I never wanted to be interviewed later, saying, 'If you had seen what we really wanted to do ... '

— Jerry Hirshberg, 2008 interview with Mark Rechtin

NDI took on several commissions outside automotive design in order to stay creative, including the commercially successful "Bubble Burner" golf club line for nearby TaylorMade, a yacht, and a computer for RDI Computer Corporation.

In 1999, Mickey Kaus attributed Nissan's poor sales performance throughout the 90s to the "loser designs" produced by NDI under Hirshberg. However, earlier in 1999, Hirshberg said Nissan had been directing conservative designs from Japan since the early 90s, after the market failure of the Infiniti J30.

By the late 90s, approximately 75% of Nissan vehicles marketed in the United States were designed at NDI. In 1999, Hirshberg served as the spokesman for Nissan advertising in America. He retired from Nissan at the end of June 2000, turning down a potential promotion to Nissan's global design chief, and continued to pursue artistic interests in retirement.

=== Credited designs ===
Hirshberg is credited with creating or assisting with the following designs:

- 1967 Pontiac Firebird
- 1968 Pontiac GTO
- 1971 Buick Riviera
- 1985 Nissan Pathfinder
- 1985 Nissan Hardbody pickup
- 1987 Nissan Pulsar NX
- 1990 Nissan Gobi (concept)
- 1991 Nissan NX
- 1992 Infiniti J30
- 1992 Nissan Altima
- 1992 Nissan Quest
- 1996 Nissan Pathfinder
- 1999 Nissan Xterra
- 1999 Nissan 240Z Concept
- 2000 Nissan Maxima
- 2000 Nissan Sentra
- 2004 Nissan Maxima
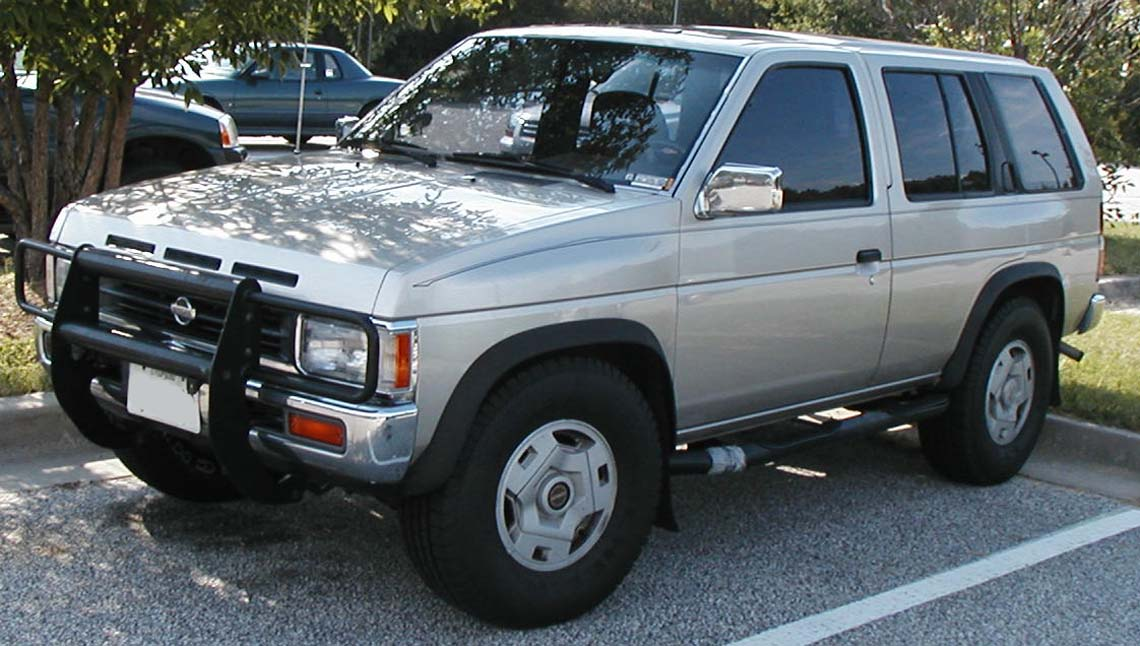
1986 Nissan Pathfinder

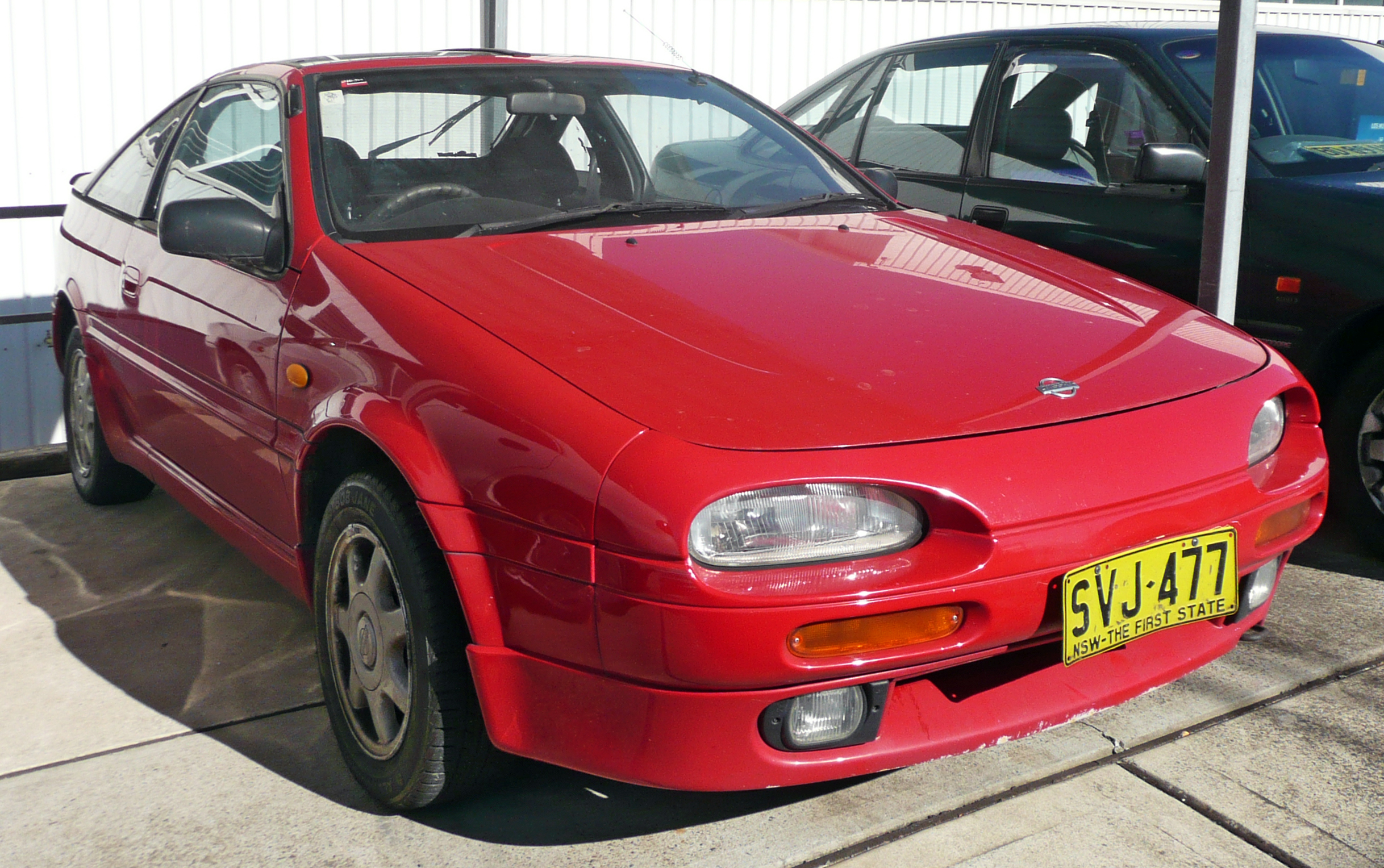
1991 Nissan NX

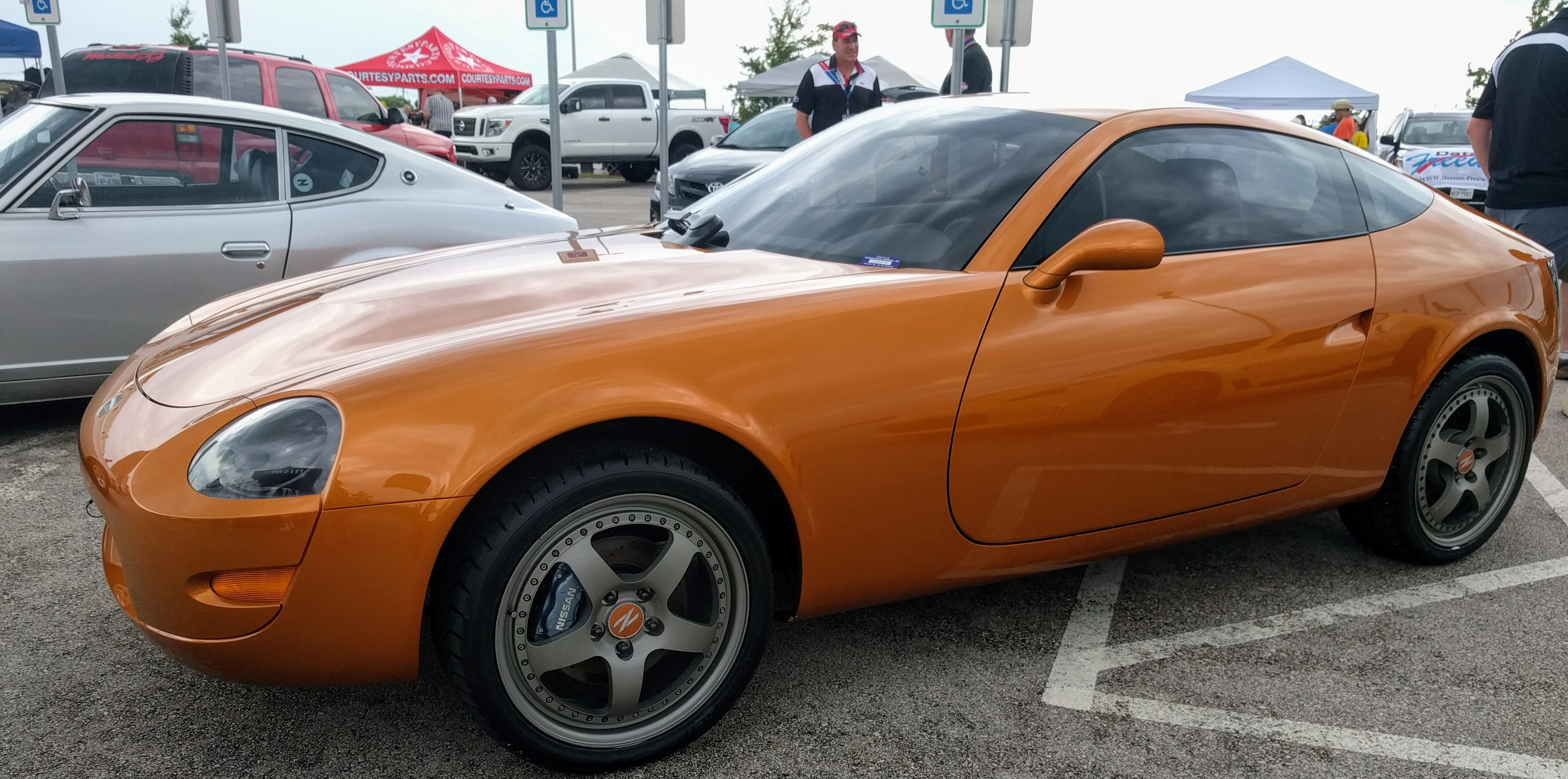
1999 Nissan 240Z Concept

== Death ==
On November 10, 2019, Hirshberg died at his home at the age of 80 after a year-long battle with glioblastoma, a type of brain cancer.
