= HICAS =

Proprietary rear-wheel steering system

HICAS (/haɪkæs/; High Capacity Actively Controlled Steering) is Nissan's rear wheel steering system which was fitted to cars from approximately 1985 to 2010, including models ranging from the Skyline (R31, R32, R33, and R34) and Fairlady Z (Z32) to smaller vehicles like the Nissan Cefiro (A31), Silvia (S13 & S15)/240SX/180SX and Nissan Serena/Nissan Largo. It is also found on models from the Infiniti division, such as the Q45, J30, M45/M35 and G35/G37.

Unlike many other four-wheel steering systems, HICAS and Super HICAS are fitted to improve handling rather than just as a parking aid. Disabling or removing HICAS has become a popular aftermarket modification, with proponents citing more predictable steering behavior as an advantage. However, after disabling HICAS, it has been noted that slow maneuvers including parking and quick response steering seemed more difficult.

== Versions ==
The versions are distinguished by the degree of rear steering and actuator for the rear steering rack, with the earliest version using a passive system to steer the rear wheels ("HICAS"), an intermediate version using a hydraulic actuator ("HICAS II"), and a later version using a hydraulic or electric actuator with additional programming ("Super HICAS").

=== HICAS ===
Passive HICAS animation, exaggerated to ±2.5°; regulating valves not shown

Nissan initiated "Project 901" in 1985, named for "90s-number-one" to embody the corporate goal to become Japan's most advanced automobile manufacturer by the 1990s. "Project 901" resulted in several vehicles sharing a similar front- and rear-multi-link suspension design, including the 300ZX (Z32), Infiniti Q45 (G50), Primera/Infiniti G20 (P10), Pulsar/Sunny (N14), Silvia (S13) & S14), Skyline (R32), and Laurel (C33). The earliest version of HICAS, as fitted to the MID4 concept vehicle (1985), was a passive system which steered the rear wheels up to 0.5° in phase with the front wheels at speeds greater than 30 km/h (19 mph). Because the passive system essentially compresses the rubber suspension bushings, the resulting angle of rear-wheel steering is relatively small. The power steering pump supplies pressure through two regulating valves to two spring-loaded hydraulic actuators on the rear axle; these valves are designed to selectively pass or stop pressure to one side of each actuator, according to vehicle speed and lateral acceleration, which then steers the rear suspension subframe and semi-trailing arms.

The passive HICAS was fitted initially to regular production vehicles with the 1986 Skyline GTS (R31) coupes (GTS, GTS-R, and GTS-X). HICAS was almost used on the 1985 model but was not ready in time for production. The system was later adapted to work on many models in the Nissan range, beginning with the Passage GT.

Implementation

- 1985–88 Nissan Skyline GTS (R31)

=== HICAS II ===
Active HICAS-II / Super HICAS animation, exaggerated to ±2.5°; with passive subframe steering and rear steering rack

A later version of HICAS, first shown on the CUE-X concept car (1985), added a hydraulic actuator and steering rack to the passive system, which allowed the car to steer the rear wheels up to 7° in opposition to the front wheels to aid maneuverability at lower speeds. This active system was called HICAS II when it reached production with the Nissan 180SX. The hydraulic system again was powered by the power steering pump, using speed sensors to determine how much and in which direction to steer the rear wheels; for production vehicles, rear steering was limited to 1°.

Implementation

- 1988–91 Nissan 180SX Type II
- 1988–93 Nissan Cefiro (A31)
- 1988–89 Nissan Silvia (S13)

=== Super HICAS ===
Compared to HICAS II, Super HICAS uses a dedicated computer instead of speed sensors to actuate rear steering by up to 1°; upon initial turn in, it is programmed to provide opposite-phase rear wheel steering before turning the rear wheels in-phase, effectively performing a Scandinavian flick. Later versions of Super HICAS moved to an electric actuator for the rear steering rack, making the system much lighter.

Implementation

- 1989–94 Nissan Skyline GT-R (R32)
- 1990–95 Infiniti Q45t
- 1990–2000 Nissan 300ZX Turbo
- 1991–93 Nissan 240SX
- 1993–94 Infiniti J30t
- 1992-1996 Nissan Leopard (Y32)
- 1993-2002 Nissan Laurel (C34-C35)

== See also ==
- Quadrasteer
- Nissan MID4
- Nissan 300ZX (Z32 Model)
- Nissan Skyline
