= Nissan GTP ZX-Turbo =

Series of racing cars

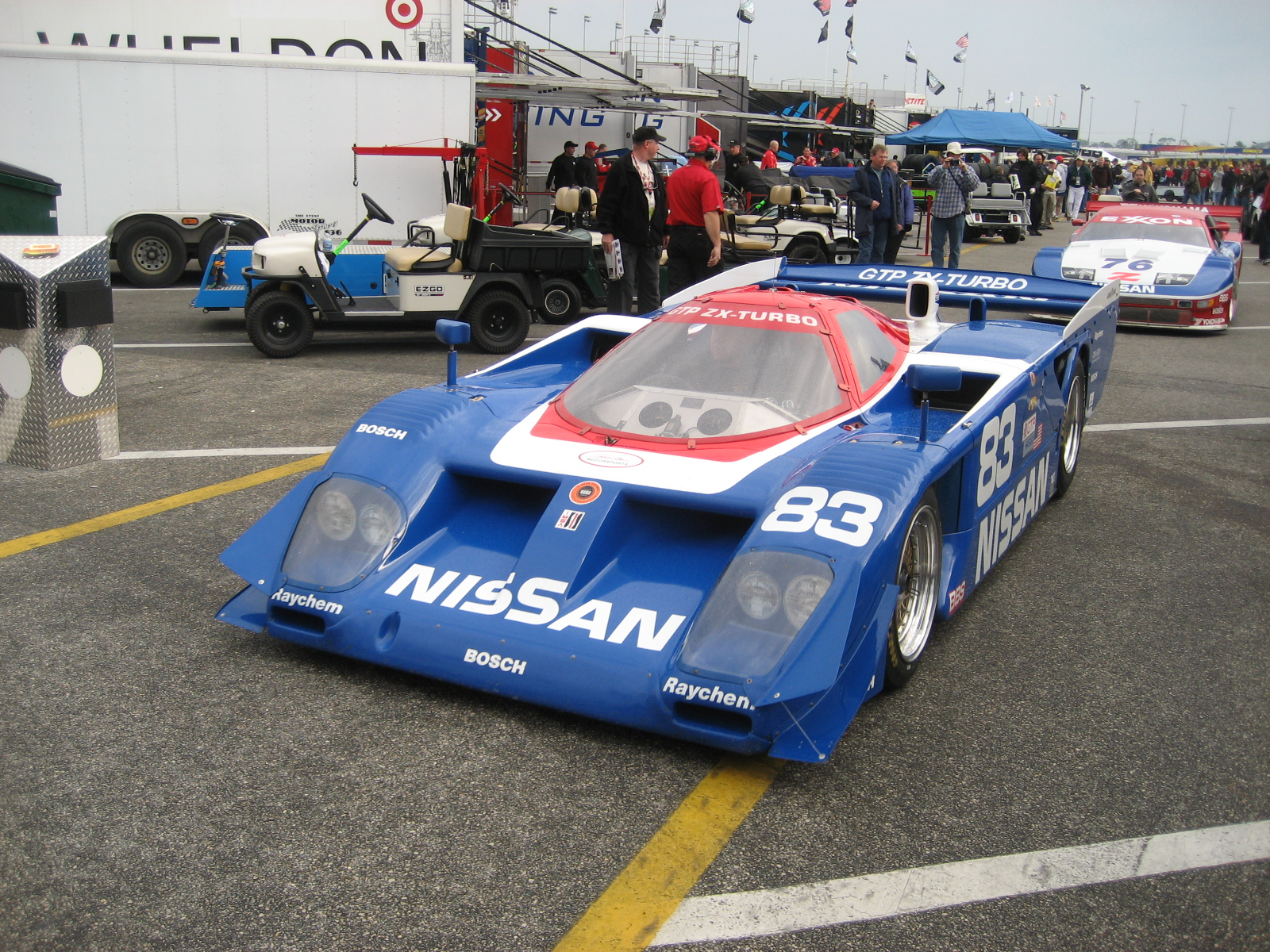
A Nissan GTP ZX-Turbo being rolled out for Historic Racing

The Nissan GTP ZX-Turbo (also known as the GTP ZX-T) was a series of racing cars developed for Nissan Motors by Electramotive Engineering to compete in the IMSA GT Championship. Running from 1985 to 1990, they were known for being the first car to defeat the Porsche 962 which had dominated IMSA's premier GTP category. This led to Nissan winning the constructor's championship and 12 Hours of Sebring in 1989 and 1990. During 1990, the GTP ZX-Turbo was replaced by the newer NPT-90.

The GTP ZX-Turbo was named due to its shared engine with the production Nissan 300ZX, the turbocharged VG30ET V6. Although the engine block was similar, the GTP ZX-Turbo's engine was extensively modified to cope with the stress of racing.

== Development ==
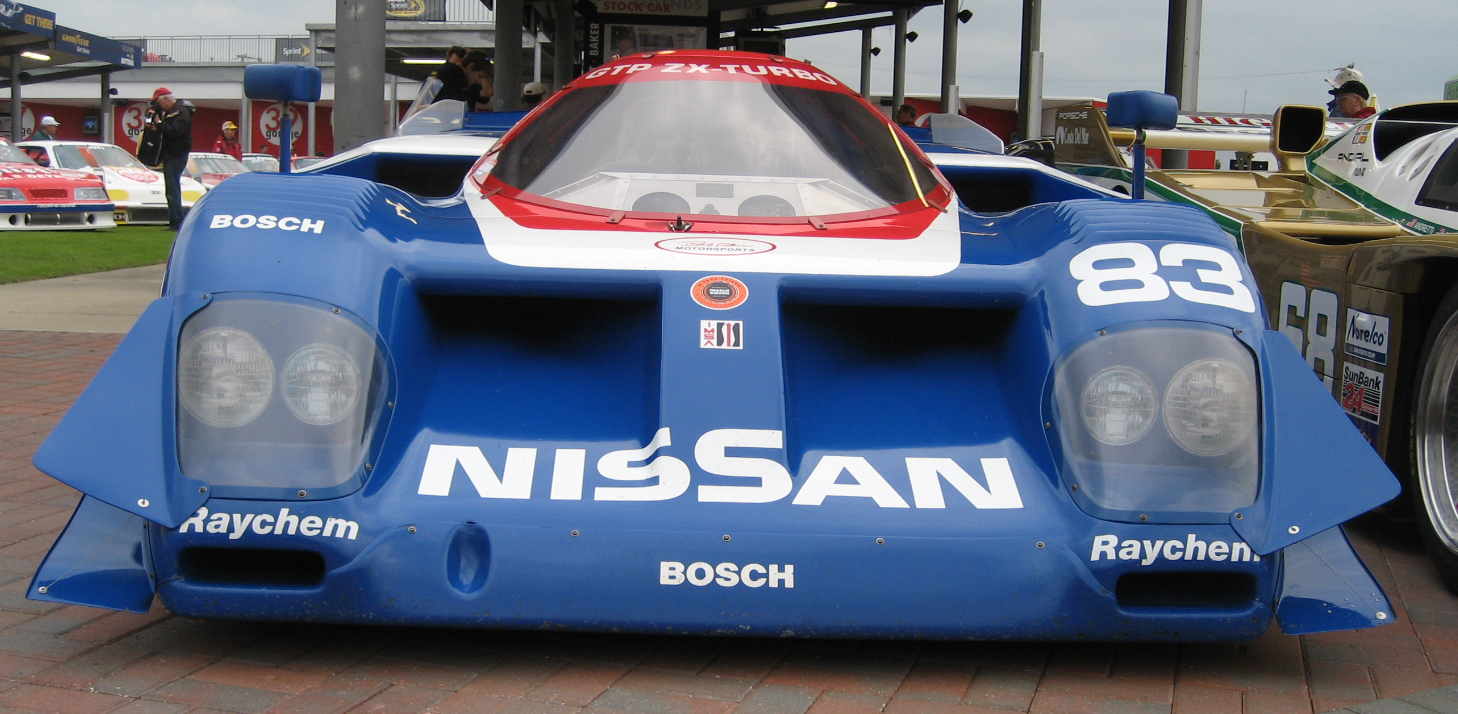
The large intakes on the front of the GTP ZX-Turbo. Brake cooling ducts are below the headlights.

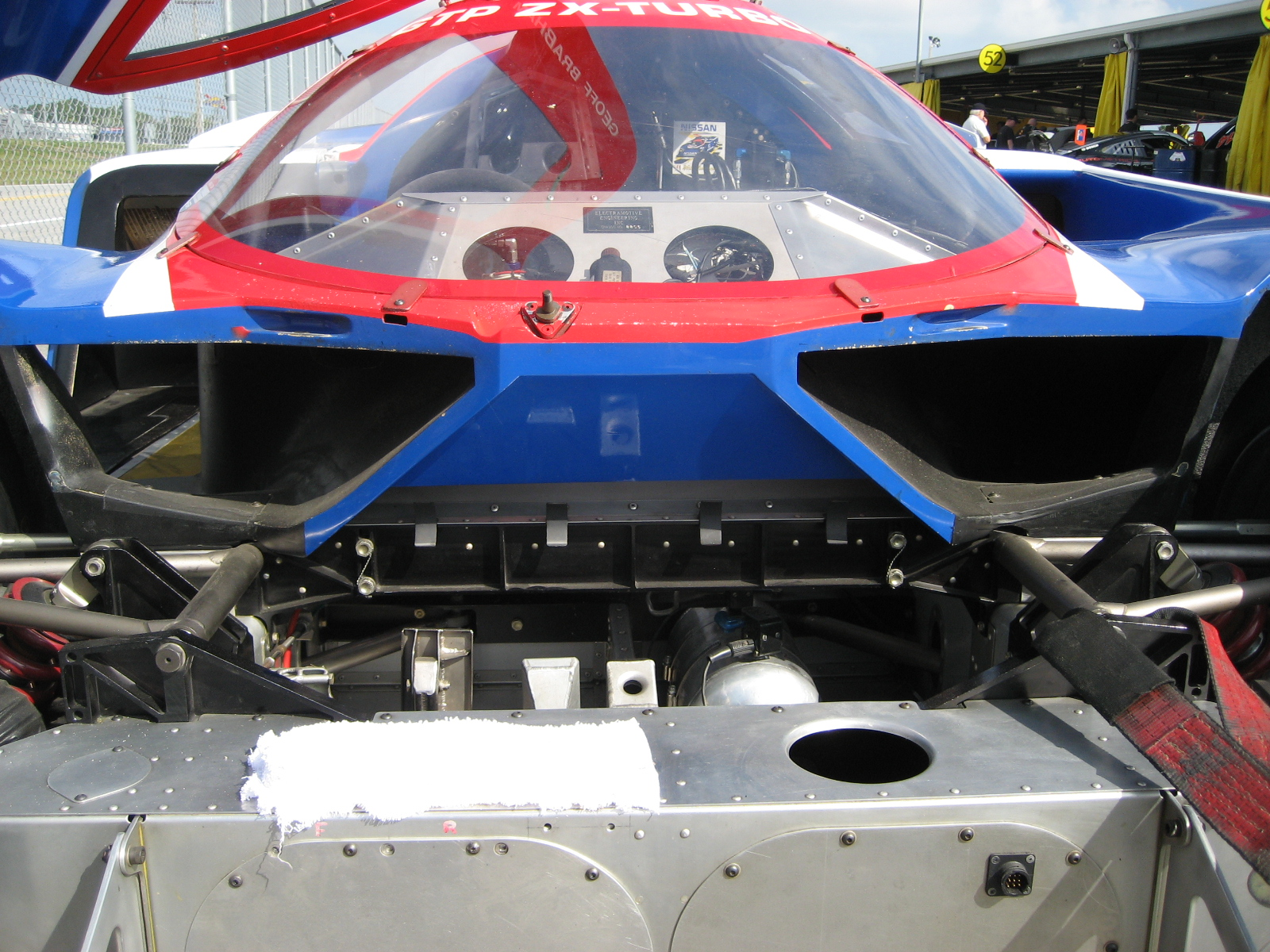
Ducting around the sides of the cockpit, air travels through the doors to the radiators. The footbox and pedals are exposed below.

In 1984, Nissan Motors named Electramotive Engineering as their official North American racing development arm in an attempt to establish Nissan in the United States following them phasing out the Datsun name. Nissan planned to use the IMSA GT Championship to showcase their technology, just as they had with the 24 Hours of Le Mans beginning in 1983. Electramotive would maintain, modify, and field the cars themselves. Nissan would provide VG30ET motors, although Electramotive would develop the engine for such racing events. Nissan and Electramotive turned to Lola Cars International to build the chassis for the new car to their specifications.

The first two chassis, (#1 and #2), termed "Lola T810", were completed in early 1985. That year's races were primarily used for development of the car in preparation for the 1986 season. Electramotive had to modify elements of the T810 in order to adapt it to any and all smaller tracks and shorter sprint races that was hosted by IMSA GT. The modified cars were renamed the GTP ZX-Turbos, as their design evolved beyond the initial T810.

One more T810 chassis, (#3) was constructed by Lola, sold to Japan but then sent to, and adapted by Electramotive by the end of 1987. Some of these cars actually shared the tub of an earlier Lola design; the T710, better known as the Chevrolet Corvette GTP. Modifications to the cars eventually reached the point that Electramotive began to construct their own chassis to replace the older cars rather than rely on Lola for cockpit tubs. A total of five Electramotive-built tubs were completed in 1988. Electramotive later became Nissan Performance Technology Inc. (NPTI) in 1990, finally retiring the GTP ZX-Turbos once the new NPT-90s were completed halfway through the 1990 season.

== Racing history ==
=== IMSA GT ===
==== 1985 - 1986 ====
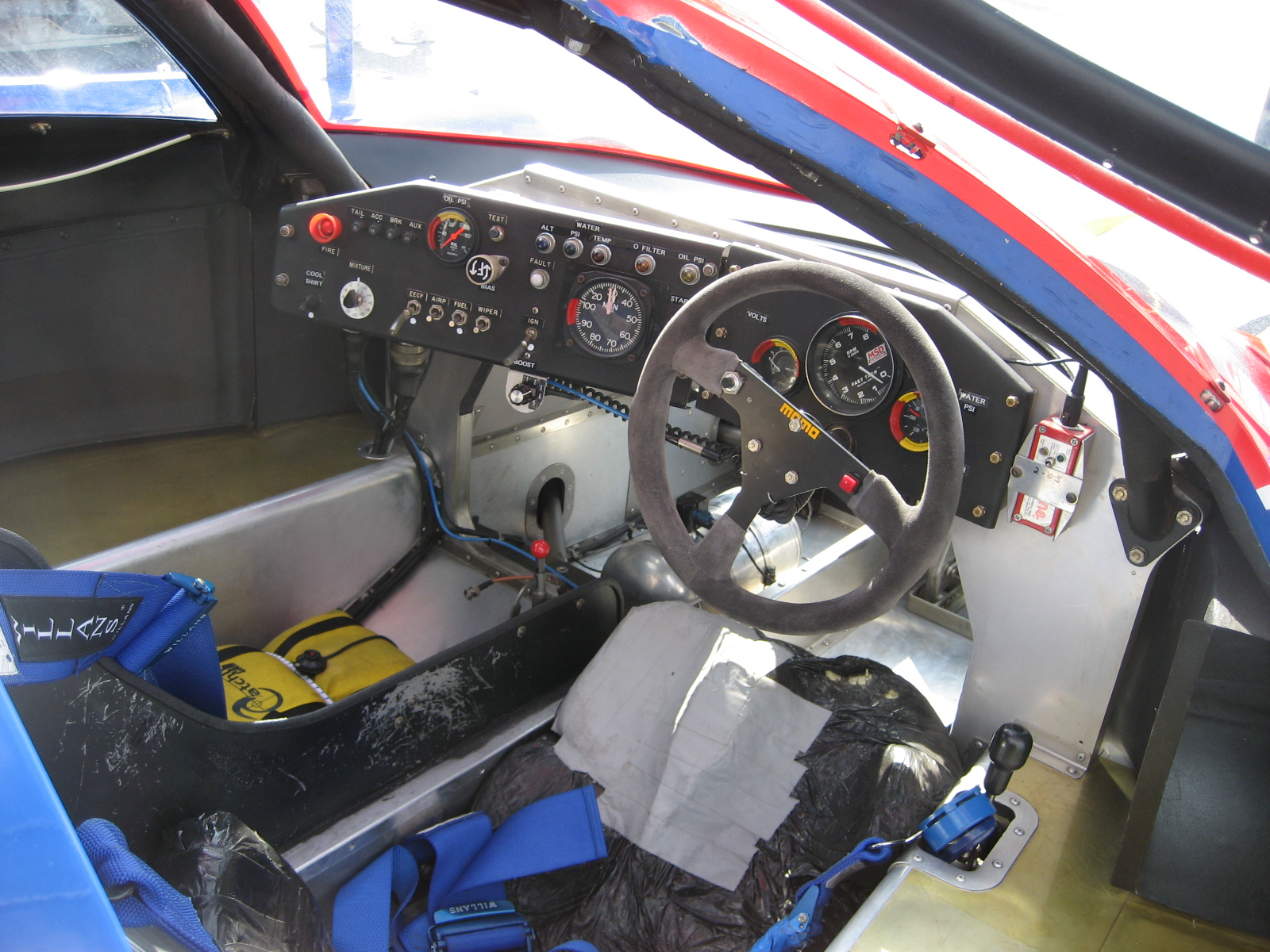
The cockpit of a GTP ZX-Turbo. A dial for altering the boost pressure is located to the left of the steering wheel, attached to the bottom of the dash.

The first Lola T810 would be completed soon after the 1985 season had begun, with that initial chassis making its competition debut at Laguna Seca. Electramotive founder Don Devendorf and co-driver Tony Adamowicz took the car to eleventh place, seven laps down from the race winner. Following a heavy accident in practice at Charlotte, the car would not return until late in the season. The car had a ninth-place finish at Sears Point before mechanical problems did not allow the car to finish any of the remaining races that season.

Nissan chose to skip several rounds of the 1986 season in order to concentrate on development of their racecar, including the 24 Hours of Daytona and 12 Hours of Sebring. The newly named GTP ZX-Turbo made its season debut on the streets of Miami, but this was followed by a string of problems over the course of the next few rounds. The car would eventually be able to finish at Mid-Ohio with a career best of seventh, but Electramotive would be able to improve on this with the car showing its first true potential of the season, fighting with the leaders at Portland and eventually coming home in third with Geoff Brabham at the helm. This would be immediately followed at the next round with a fourth-place finish. Their success would not last long though, as mechanical problems would render the car unable to finish at least several rounds. The final race of the season on the streets of Columbus would see it get a distant fifth place result, earning Nissan seventh in the constructor's championship with their points total they earned.

==== 1987 ====
Once again deciding to skip the longer rounds of the IMSA season, the GTP ZX-Turbo debuted at Miami once again. However, lessons learned from the previous season as well as testing during the winter had allowed Electramotive to greatly improve the car. This earned the GTP ZX-Turbo its maiden win at Miami, defeating a Porsche 962 by eleven seconds after three hours of racing. Nissan's success would be short lived though as the next rounds at Road Atlanta and Riverside would see the car failing to finish due to having a clutch failure and an accident respectively. Electramotive would be able to overcome these problems at Laguna Seca with a fifth place result, before their problems returned at Mid-Ohio.

Electramotive would be unable to find much success until the final round of the season at Del Mar, with the GTP ZX-Turbo closing out the season with a sixth-place finish. Although Nissan managed to take an improved fifth place spot in the constructor's championship, they still earned only a sixth of the total points that Porsche had.

==== 1988 ====
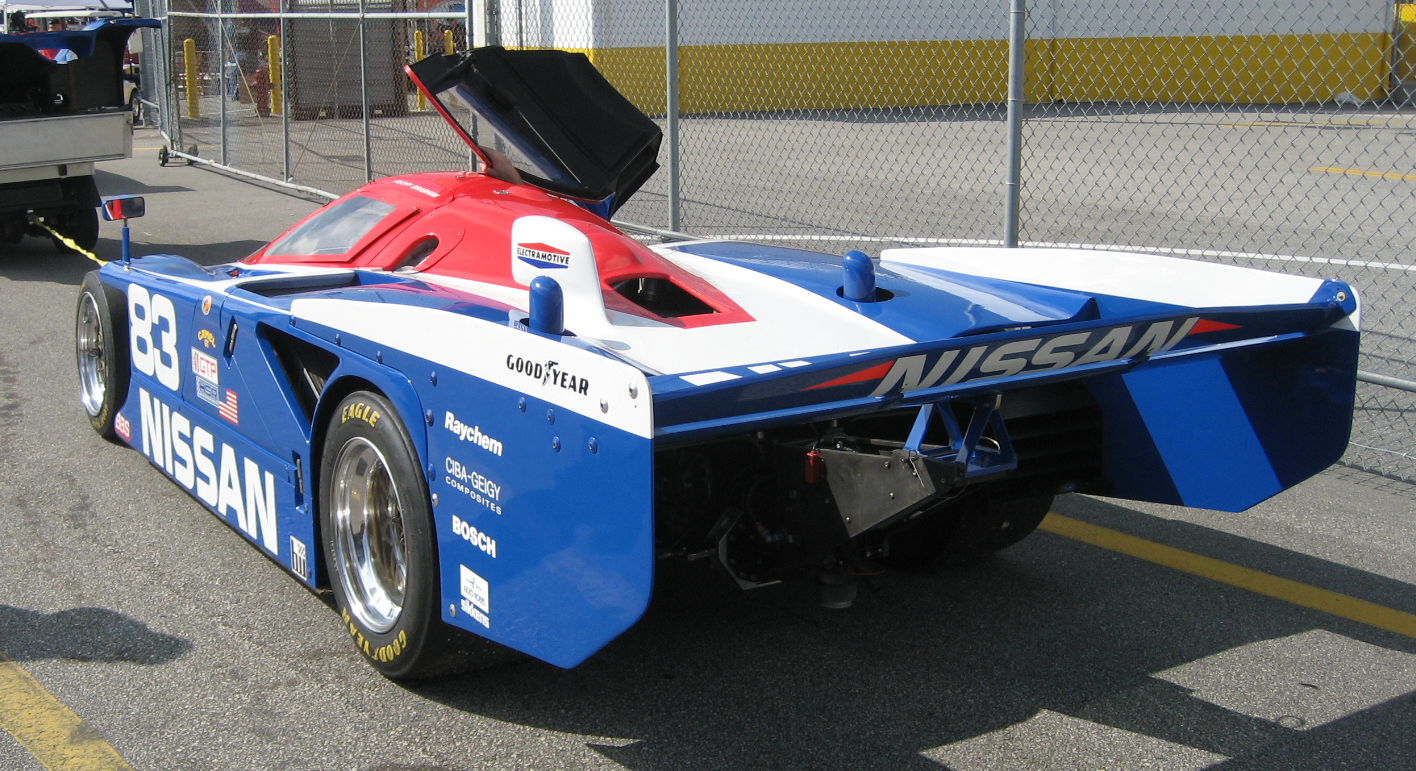
The rear of the car. The rear wing is situated beyond the main chassis and exit of the diffuser tunnels. The single white air inlet feeds the turbocharger.

Following their first ever victory, the Nissan program was expanded greatly in 1988 with plans for a two car team, although this would be delayed due to accidents in practice with the second car. Starting with a disappointing eighth at Miami, the GTP ZX-Turbo would begin its streak of successes that would help the car become a threat to the top teams. Beginning at their next race at Road Atlanta, the car defeated the factory Jaguar team by a mere four seconds. Unlike previous years, this success would continue as another victory was taken at the next round at the streets of Palm Beach, then Lime Rock Park, Mid-Ohio, Watkins Glen, and Road America. This success was mostly due to a technology developed in the turbocharger which allowed it an advantage over the naturally aspirated engines used in other prototypes.

The second car for the team was finally able to compete at Portland, and in a dominant performance the two cars swept the top spots. Although the next round would see one car finish in eighth, the other team car would manage to yet again take the race win. Only at the street race in San Antonio would the GTP ZX-Turbo's eight race win streak come to an end, with the lone entered car suffering electrical problems. The cars would return to winning form at Columbus, before the final round saw Nissan being defeated once again, with Derek Daly managing to bring one of the team cars home with a best of only fourth.

Although Nissan managed to win nine of the fourteen rounds that the GTP class competed in that season, the decision by Electramotive to skip the 24 Hours of Daytona and 12 Hours of Sebring hurt Nissan's ability to win the constructor's championship. With only three wins, Porsche's points earned at the races Nissan missed allowed them to win the championship by a mere point. However, as consolation, Nissan's Geoff Brabham would win the drivers championship by a large margin.

==== 1989 ====
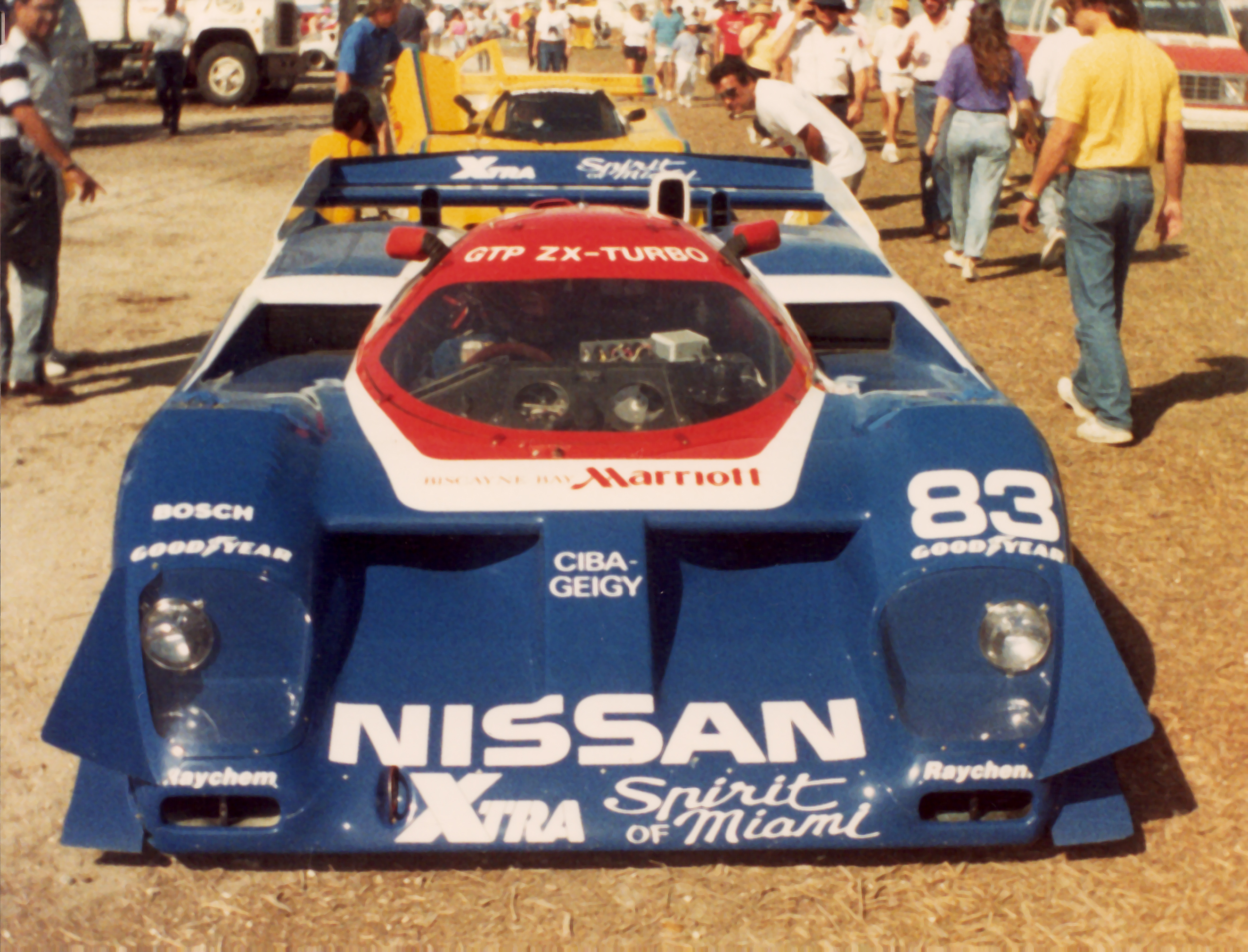
The Nissan GTP-ZX Turbo, about to start the 1989 Miami Grand Prix

Wishing to overcome their narrow defeat in 1988, Electramotive and Nissan would fight hard to win the elusive championship in 1989. Nissan wisely chose to participate in the 24 Hours of Daytona and 12 Hours of Sebring, even though the reliability of the cars was in question. Indeed, Nissan's fears were realized when neither car managed to finish at Daytona, although one did last the bulk of the race. At the shorter Miami round, the GTP ZX-Turbo would return to its winning form from the previous season, once again defeating Jaguar. However, at the 12 Hours of Sebring, the GTP ZX-Turbo would score a surprise result, with Chip Robinson, Geoff Brabham, and Arie Luyendyk taking the race victory by two laps.

With the car's endurance proven, the car took victory at Road Atlanta. Although problems took away victory on the streets of Palm Beach, the cars began a winning streak once again, taking victories at Lime Rock, Mid-Ohio, Mosport, and Road America. The team had to settle for second and third at Portland as Jaguar's new car began to show its pace. However the GTP ZX-Turbos were back at Topeka with the top two positions, beginning another short streak through San Antonio and Sears Point. Defeat came once again at Tampa, while the cars would also not be able to win the season finale at Del Mar.

With ten victories in comparison to Jaguar's three, Nissan was able to easily win the constructor's championship, the first time anyone besides Porsche had won it since the GTP class had been created in 1981. Geoff Brabham edged out Chip Robinson for his second drivers championship.

==== 1990 ====
As the defending champions, Nissan realized that the aged GTP ZX-Turbo was now the prime target of all other competitors, leading them to begin development on the car's replacement. While this car was being built, Nissan would have to continue to use the older GTP ZX-Turbos into the 1990 season. The newly renamed NPTI team would be aided by privateer Busby Racing who ran a third car that season.

Following problems once again at Daytona, the GTP ZX-Turbos would take a victory in Miami for the third time, while Busby's new car would take second. The team would also improve on their performance at Sebring by not only taking the race win, but also second for the other team car. The streak would continue through Road Atlanta and Palm Beach before the newcomer Eagle-Toyota would overcome Nissan at Topeka.

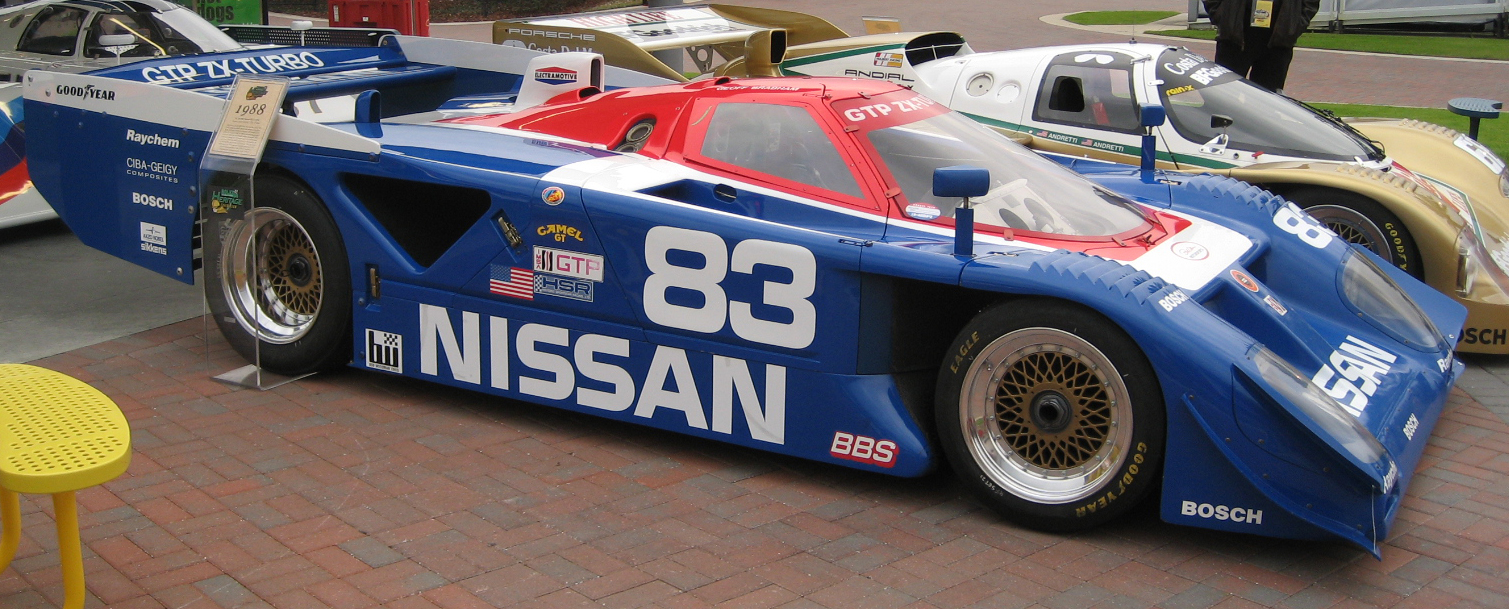
A side view of the GTP ZX-Turbo

The Topeka race would also see the debut of the GTP ZX-Turbo's replacement, the NPT-90, with the team running one car of each. Lime Rock would also see Nissan defeated, yet Mid-Ohio would have the company back on top. This time though it would be the NPT-90 defeating the GTP ZX-Turbo as the two took the top spots. Following a result of fifth behind the NPT-90's first, the GTP ZX-Turbo would be retired completely. By the next round, the second NPT-90 would be completed and replace the sole remaining GTP ZX-Turbo used by the team.

With the combined running of the GTP ZX-Turbos and NPT-90s, as well as the performance of privateers Jim Busby and later David Seabroke, Nissan would once again easily take the GTP constructors championship. Geoff Brabham would take his third drivers championship as well. One GTP ZX-Turbo would be entered by John Shapiro at the Miami round in 1991, finishing 13th before the team would fold. This would be the final race by a GTP ZX-Turbo car, although the NPT-90s would continue to carry the GTP ZX-Turbo name on them.

=== Other series ===
One of the first three Lola T810s built would be sold to the Le Mans Company in Japan for use in the All Japan Sports Prototype Championship. Debuting late in the 1985 season, the car would suffer mechanical failures before finishing eighth at the 1000 km of Fuji to close out the season. The following season, the car would continue to have problems, again only finishing at the 1000 km of Fuji. This time however the car managed sixth place, 13 laps behind the winning Porsche 962. The car would be retired as the team moved on to a Porsche.

Following the retirement of the GTP ZX-Turbo in 1990, one of the former works chassis would be taken to Europe to participate in the Interserie championship in 1991. Although quick, the car would struggle to complete races. This would lead to it being quickly abandoned.

== Marketing ==
Debuting at a time when Nissan was phasing out the Datsun brand in the United States, the GTP ZX-Turbo was used by the company to promote their ability to produce sporty, advanced cars. This led to the GTP ZX-Turbos being used in television and print advertisements for the whole Nissan brand, but also specifically the 300ZX with which it shared its engine.

The GTP ZX-Turbos were featured as part of a Miami Vice episode revolving around the IMSA GT Miami Grand Prix, although this was primarily using footage of the race itself.

The 1990 slotless racing game GT Super Screamers by Worlds of Wonder uses Nissan's GTP ZX-Turbos.

== Performance ==
in the 3/1984 Sport Auto they found the Nissan GTP ZX-Turbo had a performance of:

0 - 40 kph	1.6 s
0 - 60 kph	2.3 s
0 - 80 kph	2.8 s
0 - 100 kph	3.6 s
0 - 120 kph	4.1 s
0 - 140 kph	4.6 s
0 - 160 kph	5.6 s
0 - 180 kph	6.8 s
0 - 200 kph	8.1 s
1/4 mile	10.9 s
