= Nissan Cima =

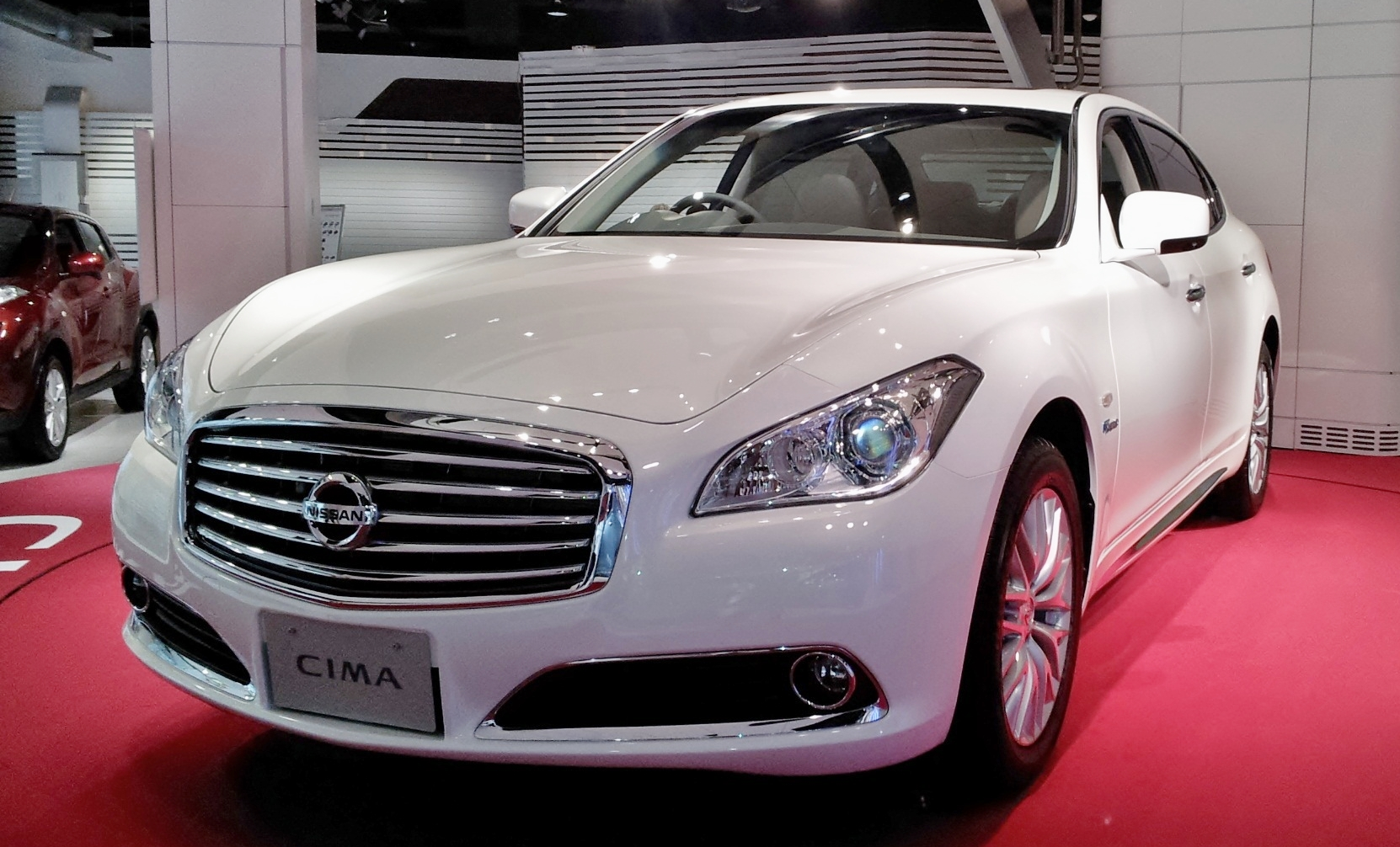
- Nissan Cima M35hL (HGY51, Japan)

Overview
- Manufacturer: Nissan
- Also called: Infiniti Q45 (1997–2006); Infiniti M/Q70L (2010–2019); Mitsubishi Dignity (2012–2016)
- Production: 1988–2010; 2012–2022
- Assembly: Japan: Kaminokawa, Tochigi

Body and chassis
- Class: Executive car (1988–1996); Full-size luxury car (1996–2022)
- Body style: 4-door hardtop sedan (1988–1991); 4-door sedan (1991–2022)

Nissan Cima logo

The Nissan Cima (Japanese: 日産・シーマ, Nissan Shīma) is a luxury sedan manufactured and marketed by Nissan across five generations for the Japanese market — and for three generations as the Infiniti Q45 internationally.

The Cima nameplate derived from Spanish for "summit" or "top." Earlier generations featured a hood ornament with an image of an acanthus leaf that gave the Nissan Laurel its name. The acanthus leaf was commonly used by classical Greeks to make a wreath for use as a crown — notable, as the Cima's chief competitor in the Japanese Domestic market was the Toyota Crown.

The Cima in its first two generations was a more luxurious and larger version of the Cedric and Gloria, with the Cima sharing its V8 engine with the earlier flagship President, Nissan's competitor with the Toyota Century. The Cima was introduced in 1988, based on an elongated Cedric/Gloria chassis. With its sales success, about 64,000 units sold the first year and 120,000 in four years, the Cima became a symbol of the "bubble economy".

The Cedric Cima was marketed at Nissan Store, while the Gloria Cima was marketed at Nissan Prince Store. Later generations of the Cima shared the same platform as the President, with the Cima being a shorter version, thereby allowing Nissan to continue offering the Cima at Nissan Prince Store locations. The last three Cima generations were marketed in the United States as the Infiniti Q45. The Q45 was discontinued after 2006, however the Cima and the President continued in production until August 2010, leaving the Fuga to become the flagship for the Infiniti line. April 2012, the Cima nameplate was resurrected, and resumed "flagship" status in Japan as a longer wheelbase version of the Fuga Hybrid.

In January 2021, Nissan considered canceling the Cima again, with production being halted at the end of 2020. The Nissan Japan website still listed it as available for new orders with a hybrid powertrain only, in three trim levels. According to the Nissan Factory website at Tochigi, Cima production was started up again in October 2021, only to be discontinued for the third and final time in 2022, leaving the Skyline to carry on as the sole sedan in Nissan's Japanese lineup.

== First generation (Y31; 1988) ==
First generation (Y31)
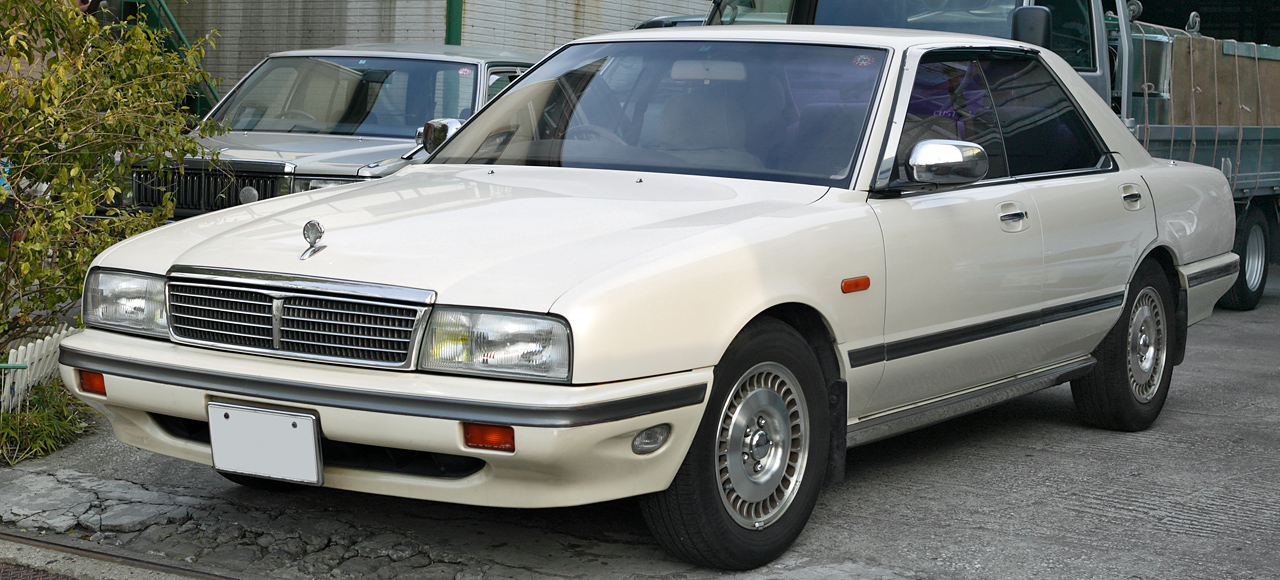
- Nissan Cedric Cima

Overview
- Also called: Nissan Cedric Cima; Nissan Gloria Cima
- Production: 1988–1991

Body and chassis
- Layout: Front-engine, rear-wheel-drive
- Related: Nissan Cedric (Y31); Nissan Gloria (Y31)

Powertrain
- Engine: Gasoline: 3.0 L VG30DE V6; 3.0 L VG30DET turbo V6
- Transmission: 4-speed automatic

Dimensions
- Wheelbase: 2,735 mm (107.7 in)
- Length: 4,890 mm (192.5 in)
- Width: 1,770 mm (69.7 in)
- Height: 1,380 mm (54.3 in)
- Curb weight: 1,640 kg (3,616 lb)

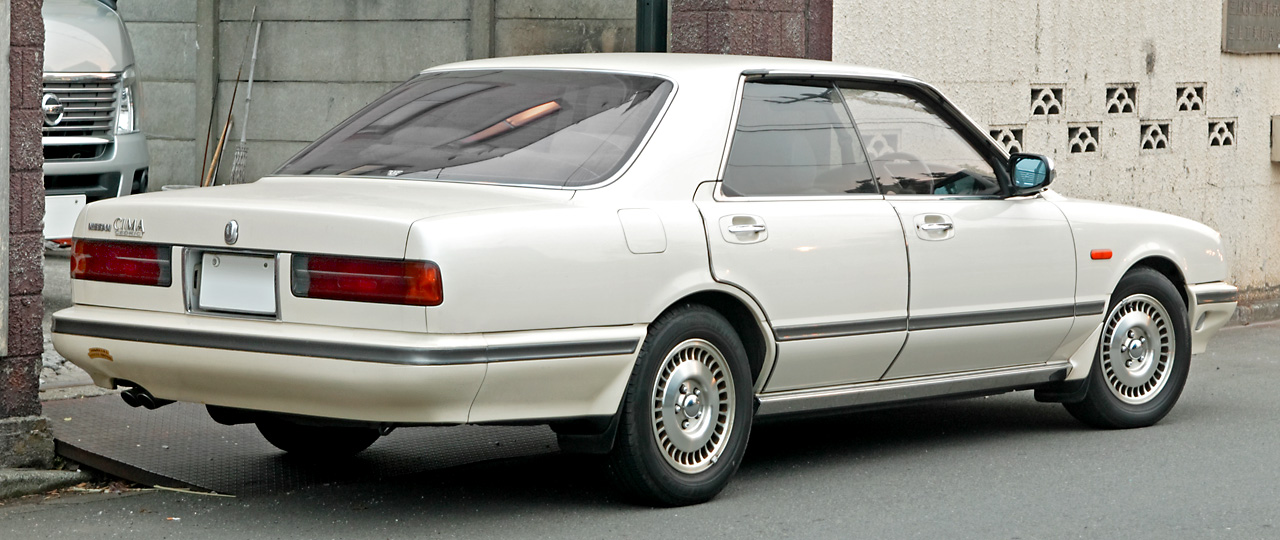
Nissan Cedric Cima

Up until 1989, the Japanese tax bracket dictated a division point at the car being 4,700 mm (185.0 in) long, 1,700 mm (66.9 in) wide, with a 2-liter engine. Both the Cedric/Gloria and its arch-rival, the Toyota Crown were stretched to this very limit, with a larger engine version also available. The bigger versions received larger bumpers to take advantage of the absence of exterior dimension restrictions, but were still somewhat of a half measure as the bodywork itself remained narrow. Nissan had already begun updating the executive limousine President which would début October 1989 as an all new model, and the availability of the Laurel and Cefiro that shared a chassis with the Skyline.

When the Gloria was introduced by Prince in 1959, before Nissan acquired them in 1966, the Gloria was a stretched wheelbase version of the Prince Skyline. When the Cedric was introduced in 1960, it also was a stretched wheelbase version of the Nissan Bluebird.

When rumors came that Toyota was developing a larger, wider extension of the Crown, called the 4000 Royal Saloon G, Nissan acted hastily to add a full-sized version of the Cedric and Gloria. Nissan, however, was unable to get the wider version ready for the narrow version's launch in June 1987, because the all-new Y31 Cedric and Gloria had just been introduced. Nissan announced the intent to introduce the Cima September 2, 1987, followed by the debut at the Tokyo Motor Show Oct 29, 1987 alongside the MID4-II with sales beginning January 1988. The half-year gap in development, however, brought about many changes in design. An all new performance enhanced Cedric and Gloria, called the Gran Turismo, had also just been introduced so the Cima sought to improve on the Gran Turismo and bring it to market quickly. Nissan was also undergoing a full technological update of all their products under the Project 901 and the Cima benefited.

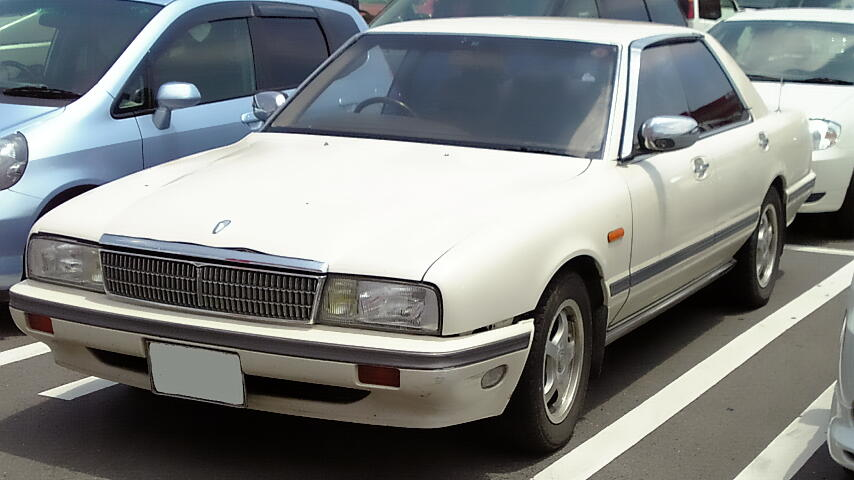
Nissan Gloria Cima

The Y31 Cima is available with a 200 PS (147 kW; 197 hp) VG30DE or a 255 PS (188 kW; 252 hp) turbocharged VG30DET. The turbocharged version was especially popular in the booming Japanese Bubble Era economy, leading the Japanese media to coin the term "the Cima phenomenon". 36,400 Cimas were sold in the first year, with the first generation selling a combined 129,000 units. The Cedric Cima was sold at dealerships Nissan Store where the Laurel could be found in Japan, and the Gloria Cima was sold at Nissan dealerships Nissan Prince that sold the Skyline.

The Cima was manufactured exclusively as a 4-door hardtop, with no B-pillar between the front and rear side glass windows, the same body style used with the previous generation Cedric and Gloria hardtops. The interior was very lavish using genuine lacquer wood inserts throughout the interior and the upholstery was a choice between Connolly leather or a silk-wool combination, shared later with the President.

The Cima was positioned for private ownership, sharing many luxury features from the full-size executive limousine President, which was popular with private-hire car service and corporate company car roles. It was offered as the Type I Limited, the Type II-S or Type II Limited AV with the turbocharged engine and an interactive CRT display for climate and sound system functions provided by Fujitsu Ten and a Sony CD changer, with the Type III with all optional equipment as standard. The CRT display also had satellite controls located on a stationary center hub while the steering wheel rotated around it, providing stereo and cruise control buttons on the hub regardless of where the steering wheel was positioned. There was an optionally available cellular phone installed in the armrest console and the center hub was available with cellphone buttons to dial numbers, connect or disconnect calls.

The suspension was shared with the Cedric and Gloria, using MacPherson struts for the front wheels and conventional shock absorbers and coil springs for the rear wheels, combined with Semi-trailing arm for all wheels. The MacPherson struts were optionally installed with internal air chambers on the top-level Type III.

Japanese actress Kazue Ito had originally purchased this generation at the age of 24 and continued to own and drive the car. While the car had accumulated more than 250,000 km (155,342.8 mi), Nissan offered to restore and replace all worn out parts without cost to her. The process took about 8 months from April 2021 and completed on December 7 of the same year. The car was presented at the Nissan Ginza showroom in Tokyo to Ito, and it was also announced in a Nissan press release on the same date, which coincided with her birthday. The total cost of the restoration is said to have exceeded the cost of the original Cima, which was ¥5 million in 1990, or US$44,000 (equivalent to $108,431 in 2025).

== Second generation (Y32; 1991) ==
Second generation (Y32)
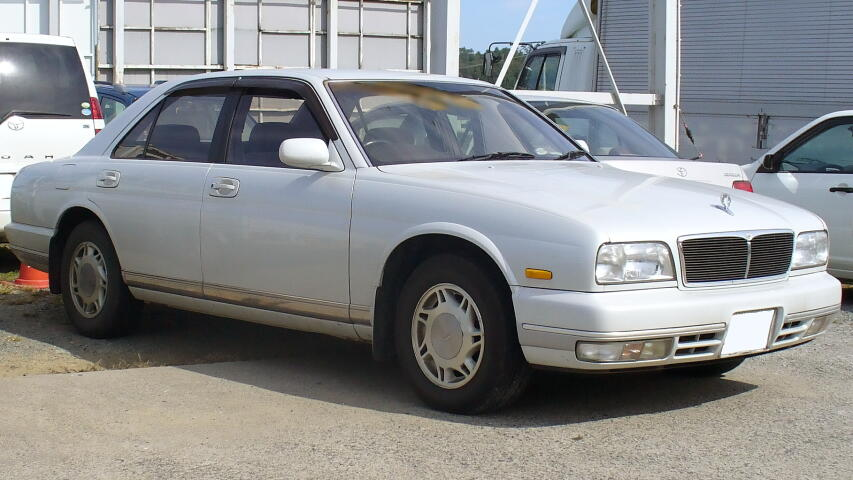
- 1991 Nissan Cima

Overview
- Production: 1991–1996

Body and chassis
- Layout: Front-engine, rear-wheel-drive; Front-engine, four-wheel-drive
- Related: Nissan Cedric (Y32); Nissan Gloria (Y32); Nissan Leopard (Y32)

Powertrain
- Engine: Gasoline: 3.0 L VG30DET turbo V6; 4.1 L VH41DE V8
- Transmission: 4-speed automatic

Dimensions
- Wheelbase: 2,815 mm (110.8 in)
- Length: 4,930 mm (194.1 in)
- Width: 1,780 mm (70.1 in)
- Height: 1,420 mm (55.9 in)
- Curb weight: 1,740 kg (3,836 lb)

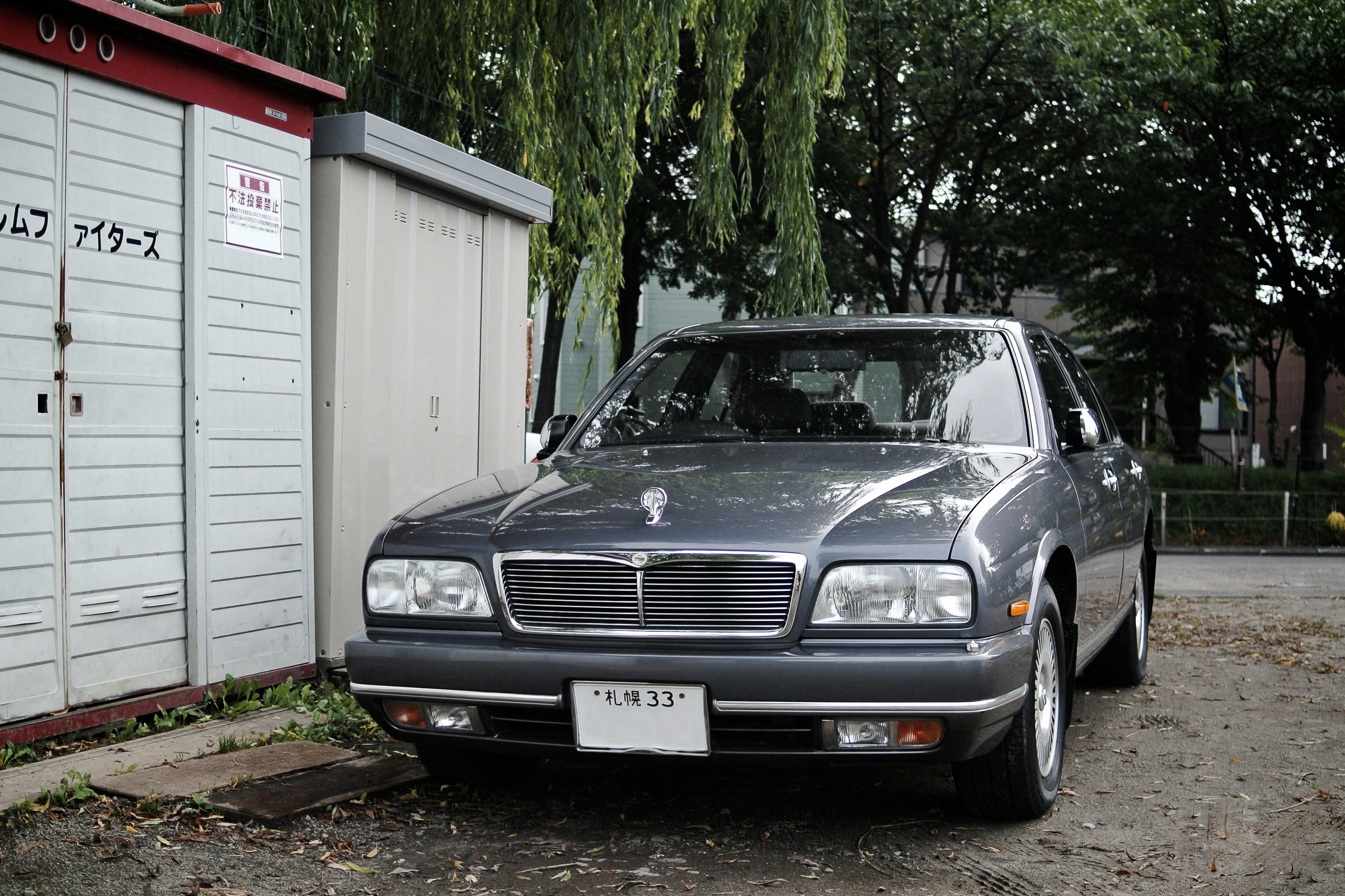
Nissan Cima (pre-facelift, Japan)

Following the Y32 Cedric/Gloria's June 1991 launch, the Cima was redesigned and introduced in August 1991. The car is simply known as the Cima, and was a premium trim package at Nissan Prince Store locations alongside the Skyline, Gloria and Infiniti Q45. Later in the year, Toyota launched the independent Crown Majesta competing with the sport-oriented trim levels. The collapse of the Japanese asset price bubble resulted in lower sales for either car, compared to Nissan's previous Y31 model. The Cima also competed for sales in this elevated luxury segment with the Toyota Aristo.

Initially the Cima was only available with the VH41DE series V8, a short-stroke version of the VH45DE used in the President, the 3.0 L VG30DET turbo V6 was offered to provide a rewarding feeling of torque when accelerating, which was popular with the previous generation, and a reduced yearly road tax obligation. This luxurious feeling of acceleration was in contrast to the reality of driving in Japan, once it's realized that urban two-way streets are usually zoned at 40 km/h (25 mph) or less, as mentioned in the article Speed limits in Japan.

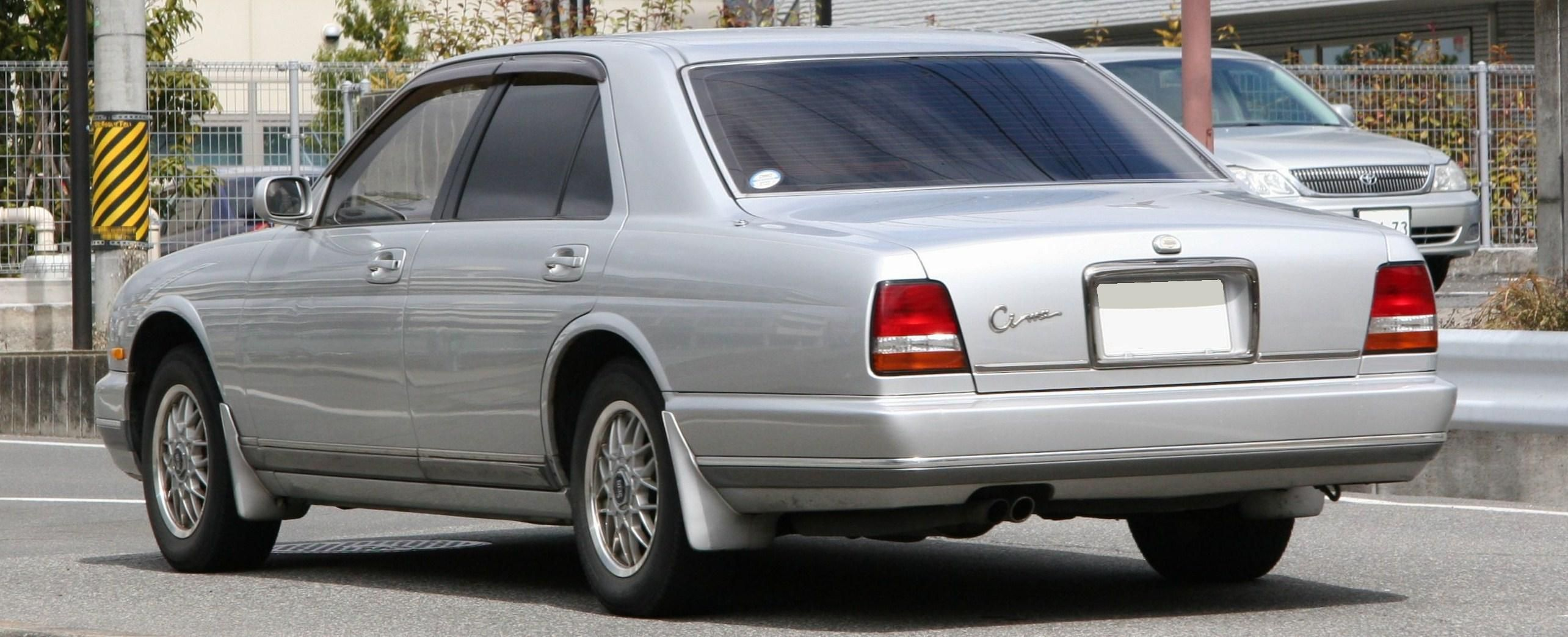
Nissan Cima (FY32) in Japan

Its appearance was said to reflect a more British appearance, both inside and out while sharing visual cues to the President. An analog clock, found on most US-spec Infiniti during the same time period, also appeared in this vehicle. AWD was also added to the options list. Due to softening sales as a result of the bubble economy collapse, the interior color choices were limited to black or gray, with elm wood inserts and black or gray leather or wool upholstery, or tan interior with contrasting leather or wool upholstery with cherry wood inserts. The trim package names Type III, Type II and Type I continued.

September 1992, the Cima Type II Limited S-Four using the ATTESA E-TS drivetrain was added to the options list, mated to the V8 engine. It produced 270 PS (199 kW; 266 hp) at 6000 rpm and 371 N⋅m (274 lb⋅ft) of torque at 4400 rpm. The suspension initially used Semi-trailing arm suspension for all wheels, then shared the Multi-link suspension used by the President and Skyline (R32). The adjustable air suspension introduced in the previous generation was replaced with the hydraulic Full-Active Suspension that was available on the US-spec Q45 and President.

For 1993, the Cima was an alternative for private ownership to the shorter 2,880 mm (113.4 in) wheelbase President JS which was exclusive to Nissan Store locations, while remaining more upscale and longer to the Gloria with a 2,760 mm (108.7 in) wheelbase.

== Third generation (Y33; 1996) ==
Third generation (Y33)
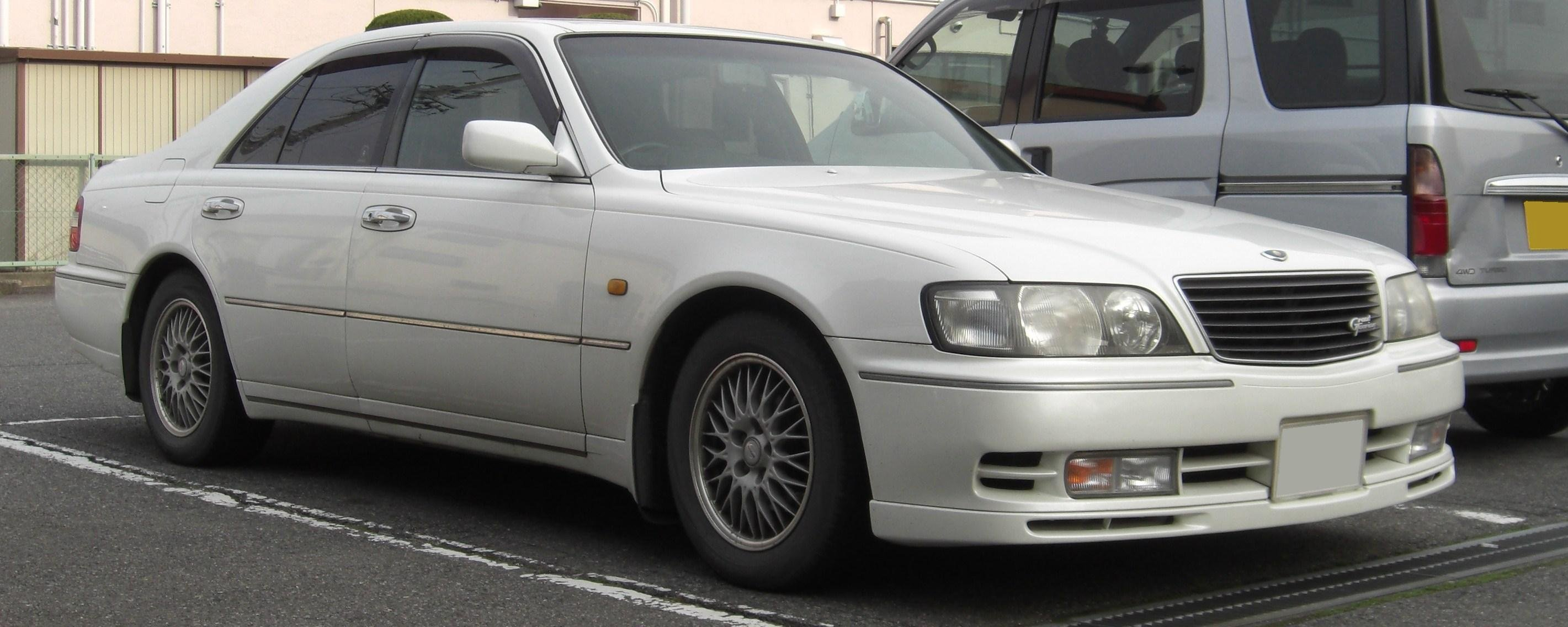
- Nissan Cima Grand Touring 30TR (FY33)

Overview
- Also called: Infiniti Q45 (1997–2001)
- Production: 1996–2001

Body and chassis
- Layout: Front-engine, rear-wheel-drive; Front-engine, four-wheel-drive
- Related: Nissan Cedric (Y33); Nissan Gloria (Y33); Nissan Leopard (Y33)

Powertrain
- Engine: Gasoline: 3.0 L VQ30DET turbo V6; 4.1 L VH41DE V8
- Transmission: 4-speed automatic

Dimensions
- Wheelbase: 2,830 mm (111.4 in)
- Length: 4,970 mm (195.7 in)
- Width: 1,820 mm (71.7 in)
- Height: 1,445 mm (56.9 in)
- Curb weight: 1,730 kg (3,814 lb)

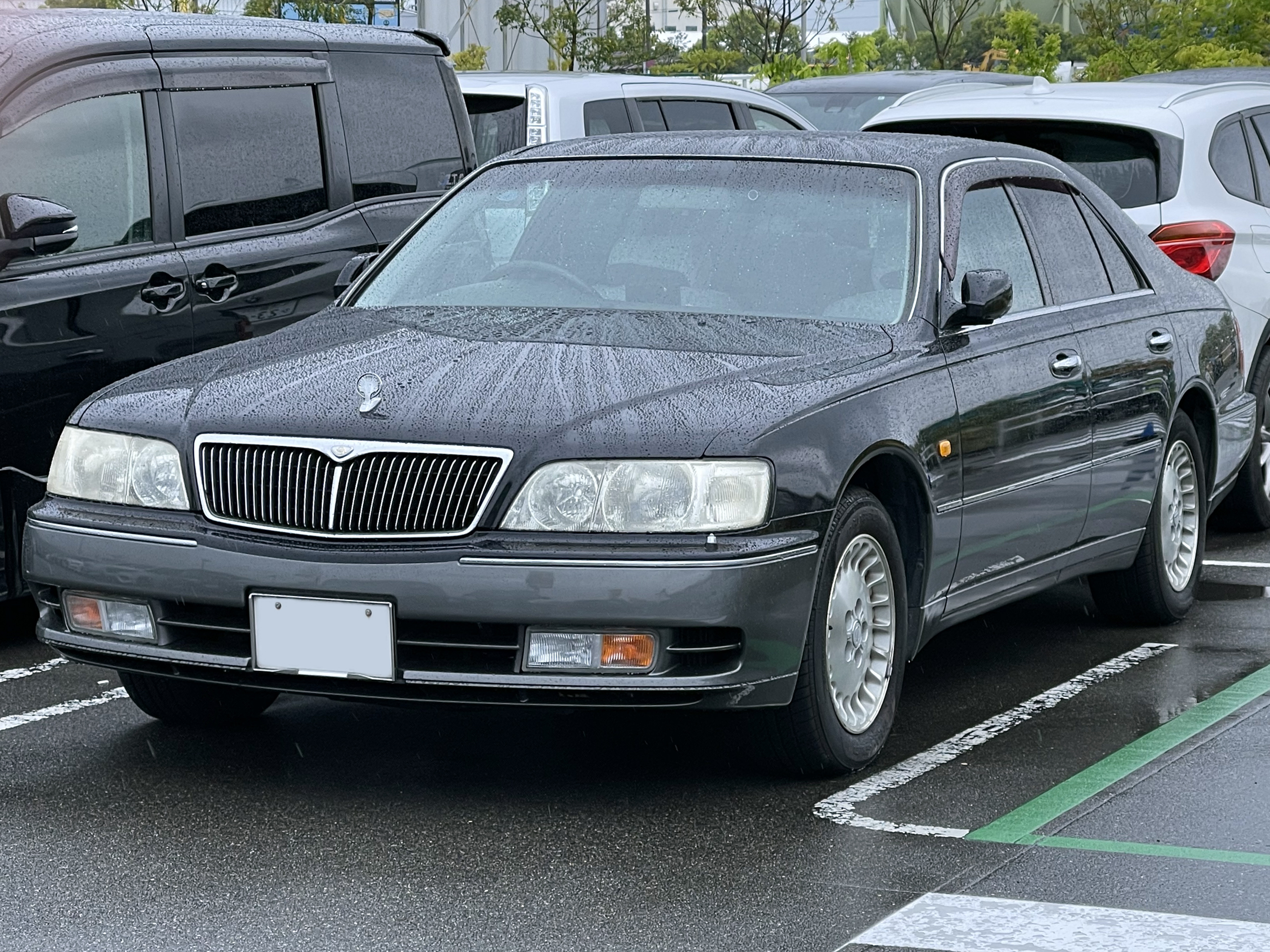
Nissan Cima 41LV (FY33)

The all-new Cima was inveiled June 1996 following the introduction of the all-new, shorter wheelbase, Cedric and Gloria twins. The trim package names changed to a European-style alphanumeric format, adding the engine displacement as a part of the name. They were the 41LX, 41LV, 41L, 30LV, 30L, with the performance "Grand Touring" series, starting with the 41TR-X, 30TR, 30T grades, that added aerodynamic appearance parts and the ATTESA E-TS AWD drivetrain upgrade for vehicles installed with a V8. The top trim package 41LX and the 41LV also included a VIP package that added car service, chauffeur-driven features. For 1997 the AWD was added to the 41LV and added the "S-Four" badge.

Unlike the previous, JDM only models, the third-generation Cima was also marketed overseas—as the second generation Infiniti Q45. Instead of the VH45DE V8 engine, which remained exclusive to the President, Nissan carried over the VH41DE V8 and the VQ30DET turbo V6 due to reduced yearly road tax obligation from the previous generation.

August of 1997, the Japanese market Nissan Infiniti Q45 ended, and the Cima became the de facto replacement. Both the Japanese Q45 and the Cima were both sold at Nissan Prince Store locations, and the Q45 was slightly more expensive due to its similarity to the President, which was exclusive to Nissan Store locations. This was also the same year Nissan introduced a telematics in-car navigation system instead of sending CD or DVD based map updates called Compass Link.

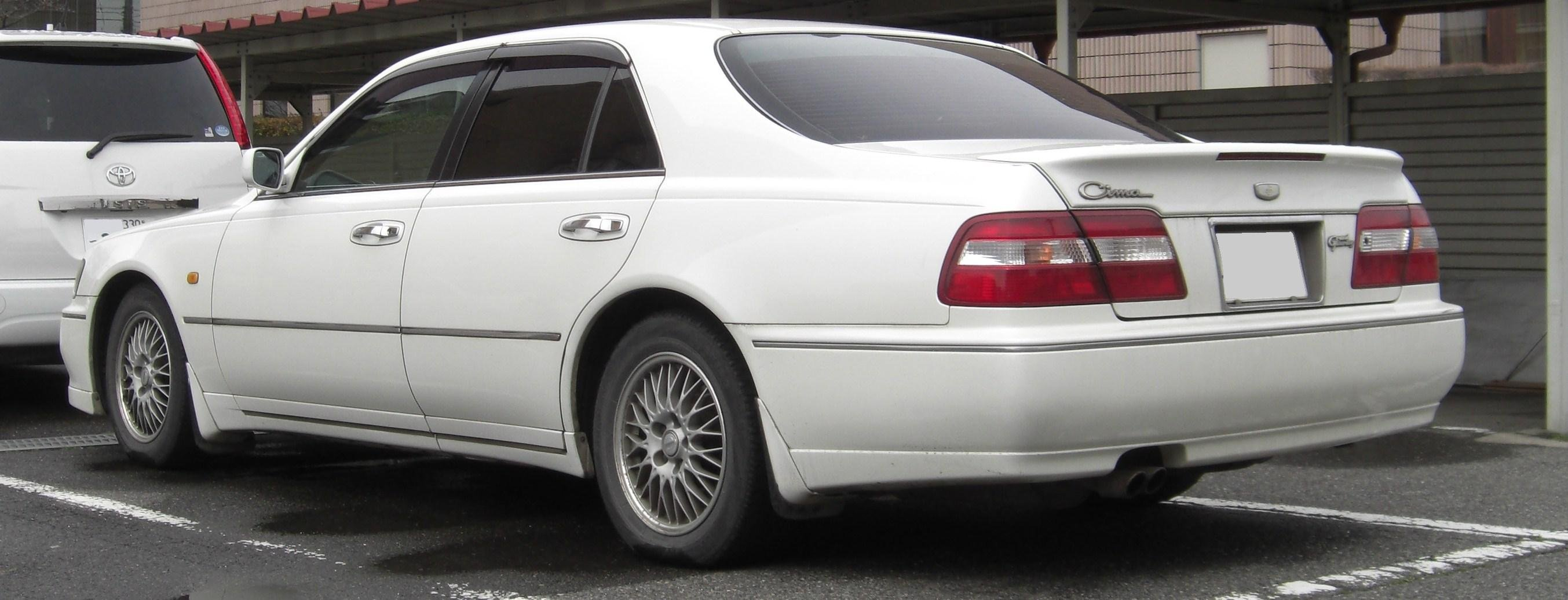
Nissan Cima Grand Touring (FY33) in Japan

In 1999, the Cima was exclusive to reorganized Nissan JDM Nissan Red Stage dealerships, while the President was now exclusive to Nissan Blue Stage locations. AWD was still offered in Japan only and it was the first car marketed in Japan with side airbags as standard equipment. As this generation was now sold at Nissan Red Stage dealerships next to the Skyline, the Cima was given a performance-car appearance to capitalize on the popularity of the Skyline called "Grand Touring".

In 1999, the Cima became the first Nissan with laser adaptive cruise control.

== Fourth generation (F50; 2001) ==
Fourth generation (F50)
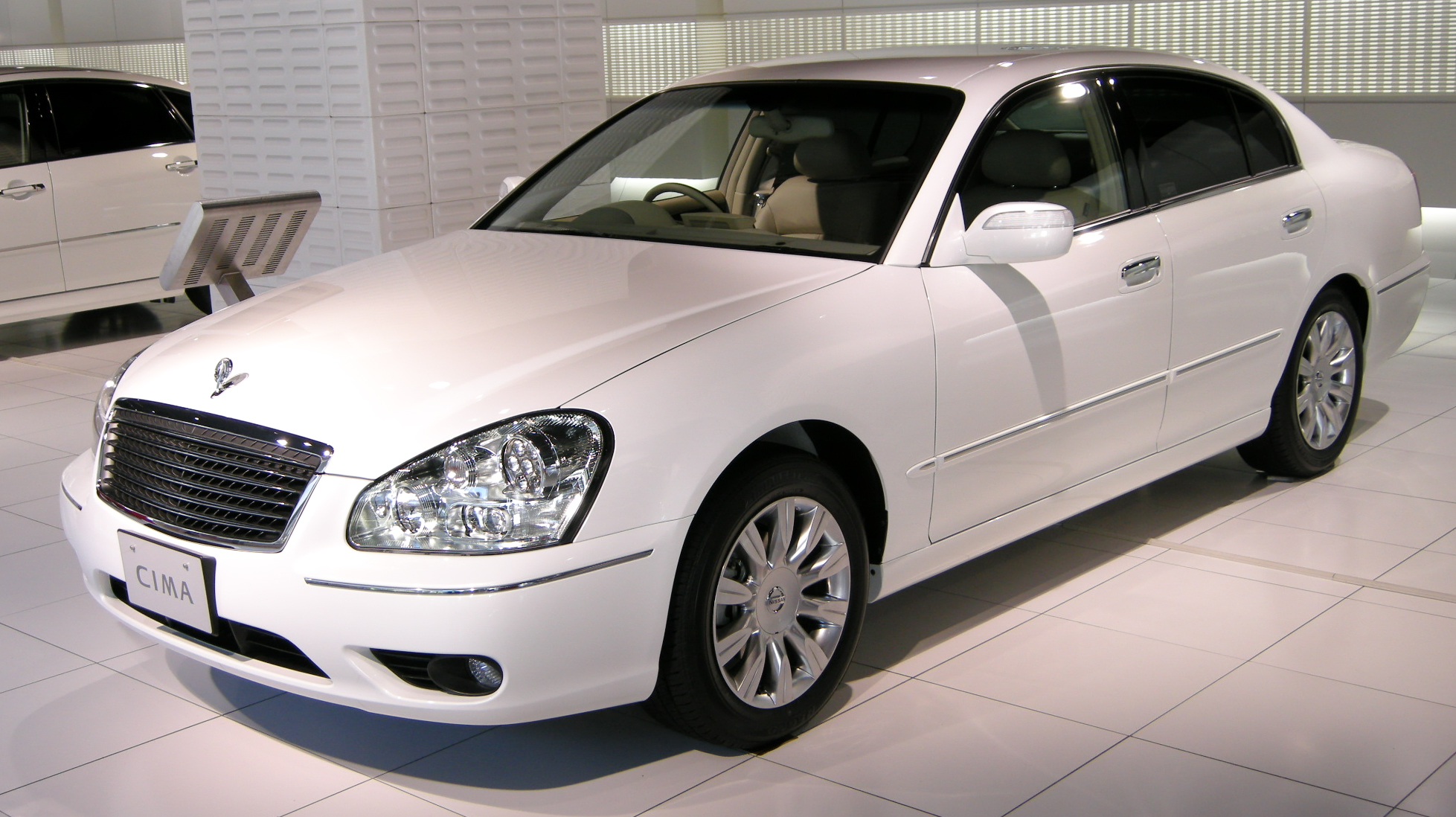
- 2008 Nissan Cima (F50)

Overview
- Also called: Infiniti Q45 (2001–2006)
- Production: 2001–2010

Body and chassis
- Layout: Front-engine, rear-wheel-drive; Front-engine, four-wheel-drive
- Platform: Nissan LL platform
- Related: Nissan President (F50)

Powertrain
- Engine: Gasoline: 3.0 L VQ30DET turbo V6; 4.5 L VK45DD V8
- Transmission: 4-speed automatic; 5-speed automatic

Dimensions
- Wheelbase: 2,870 mm (113.0 in)
- Length: 4,995–5,120 mm (196.7–201.6 in)
- Width: 1,845 mm (72.6 in)
- Height: 1,490–1,505 mm (58.7–59.3 in)
- Curb weight: 1,720–1,920 kg (3,792–4,233 lb)

The fourth-generation Cima arrived in January 2001, early in the Nissan Revival Plan. The Cima features an updated version of the President platform, with an updated rear suspension and revised exterior and interior styling. Known for its unique 7-reflector headlights, the Cima was marketed in the US as the Infiniti Q45. This model continued to be Nissan's rival to the Crown Majesta, and also competed for customers for three years with the Japan only Mitsubishi Proudia, however Mitsubishi chose to use front wheel drive.

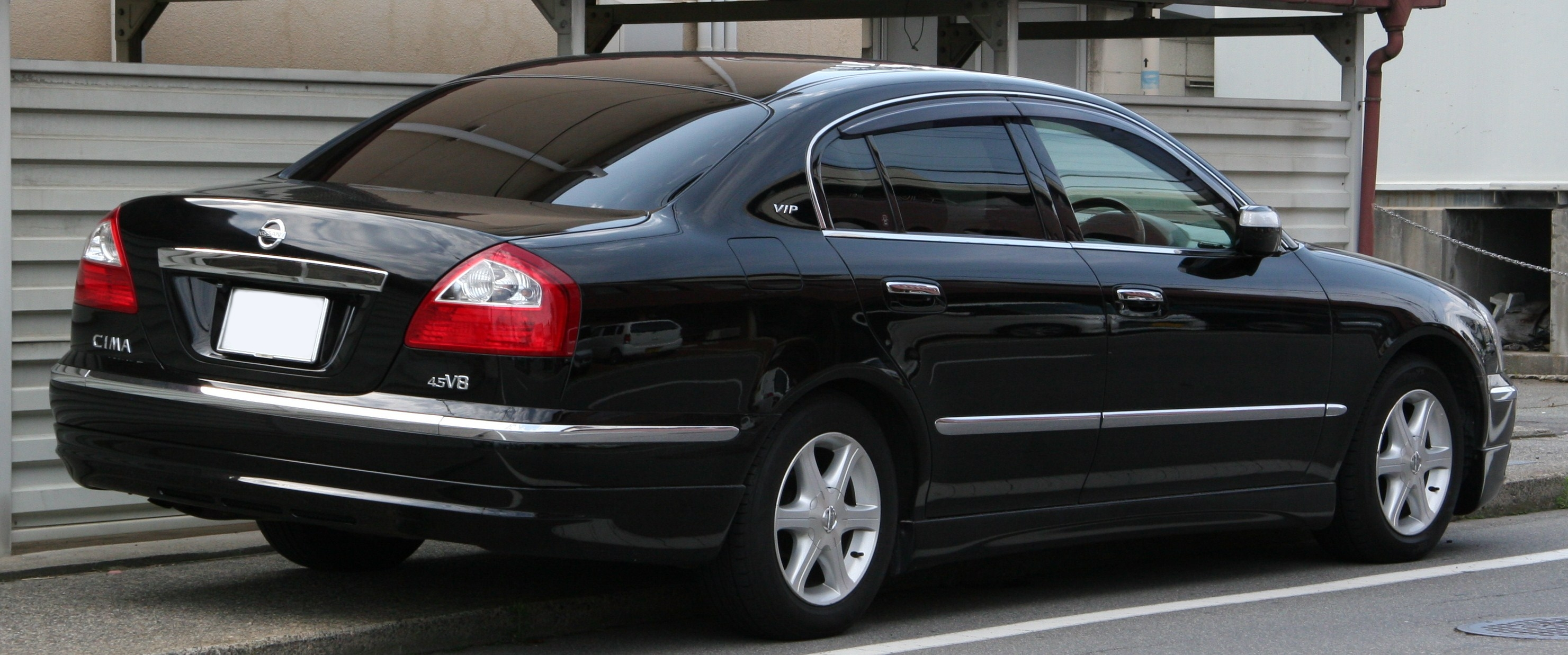
Nissan Cima VIP (F50)

The VK45DD direct-injection V8 features in the Japanese Cima, alongside the VQ30DET, both producing 280 PS (206 kW), and the ATTESA E-TS AWD drivetrain upgrade option continued for vehicles installed with a V8. The V8 in the Infiniti version produces 340 hp (254 kW; 345 PS). A Bose sound system was offered in June 2002. The trim package names carried over from the previous generation, using the engine displacement. They were 450VIP, 450XV Limited, 450XV, 450XL and 300G for rear wheel drive, and 450VIP Four or the 450X Four that continued to use the ATTESA E-TS drivetrain system.

February 2002, the Compass Link navigation system was upgraded and renamed CarWings and was standard on all grades.

The Cima 450XV Limited was the first vehicle internationally to offer Lane departure warning system by using CCD Cameras that identify painted lines on the road and notify the driver if the vehicle has crossed over the line without using a turn signal indicator. For August of 2003 Nissan offered Intelligent Brake Assist, Front Seat Emergency Brake Sensing Pre-Crash Seatbelt, and Active AFS, which automatically switched between low and high-beam modes while using xenon headlights.

A left-hand drive version of this generation was offered for sale in China at the Shanghai Auto Show in April 2003. Due to tightening emissions restrictions, the turbocharged vehicle was no longer offered on the V6 engine starting July 2005. The Q45 was no longer exported to the US after MY 2006. This generation of the Cima is very similar to the President.

In August 2010, Nissan stopped production of both the Cima and President, which shared their chassis. The company's analysis noted that both models would require significant safety upgrades to comply with the latest safety regulations, while sales could not support the associated redevelopment costs. The Fuga thus became Nissan's flagship.

When the Fuga assumed the role as flagship sedan of Nissan Japan August 2010, it became the first time that Nissan didn't sell a premium luxury V8 sedan in Japan since 1964; the Fuga's North American cousin, the Infiniti M56, is offered with a V8 engine shared with the Infiniti QX56.

== Fifth generation (Y51; 2012) ==
Fifth generation (Y51)
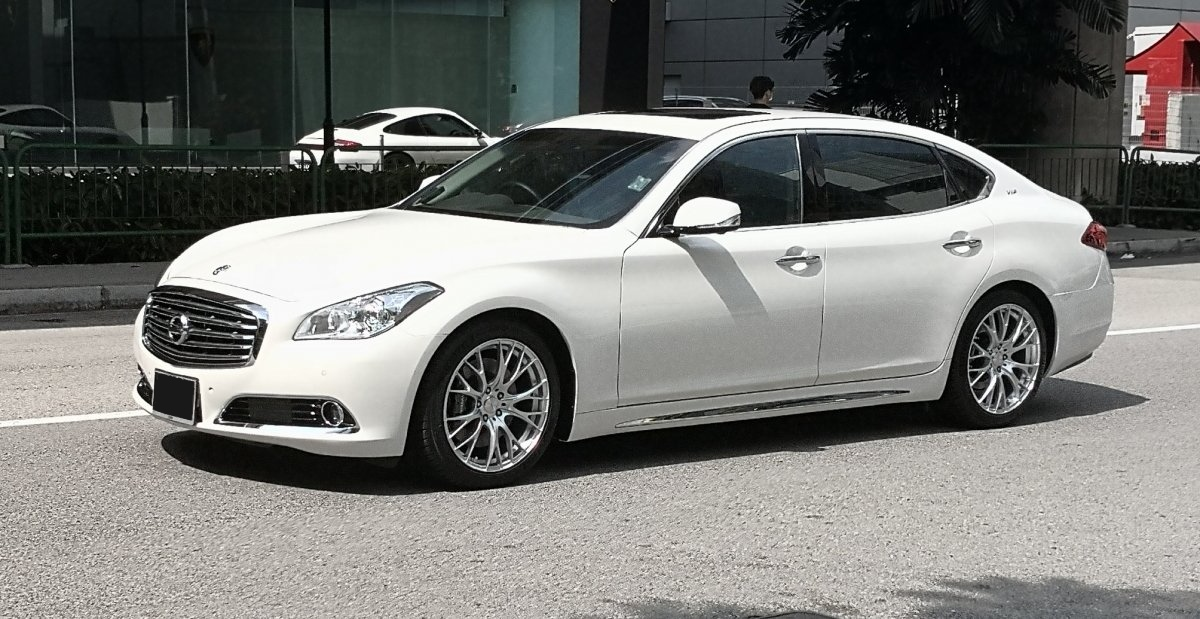
- Nissan Cima VIP Hybrid G (HGY51)

Overview
- Also called: Mitsubishi Dignity (2012–2016); Infiniti M/Q70L hybrid (2010–2019)
- Production: 2012–2022

Body and chassis
- Layout: Front-engine, rear-wheel-drive Front-engine, all-wheel-drive
- Platform: Nissan FM-L/"enhanced FM" platform

Powertrain
- Engine: Gasoline: 3.5 L VQ35HR V6 (hybrid); 3.7 L VQ37VHR V6; 2.5 L VQ25HR V6
- Electric motor: 50 kW (67 hp; 68 PS) HM34
- Transmission: 7-speed Jatco JR712E Automatic; 8-speed X-Tronic CVT (AWD)
- Hybrid drivetrain: Parallel hybrid

Dimensions
- Wheelbase: 3,050 mm (120.1 in)
- Length: 5,095 mm (200.6 in)
- Width: 1,845 mm (72.6 in)
- Height: 1,510 mm (59.4 in)
- Curb weight: 1,930–1,950 kg (4,255–4,299 lb)

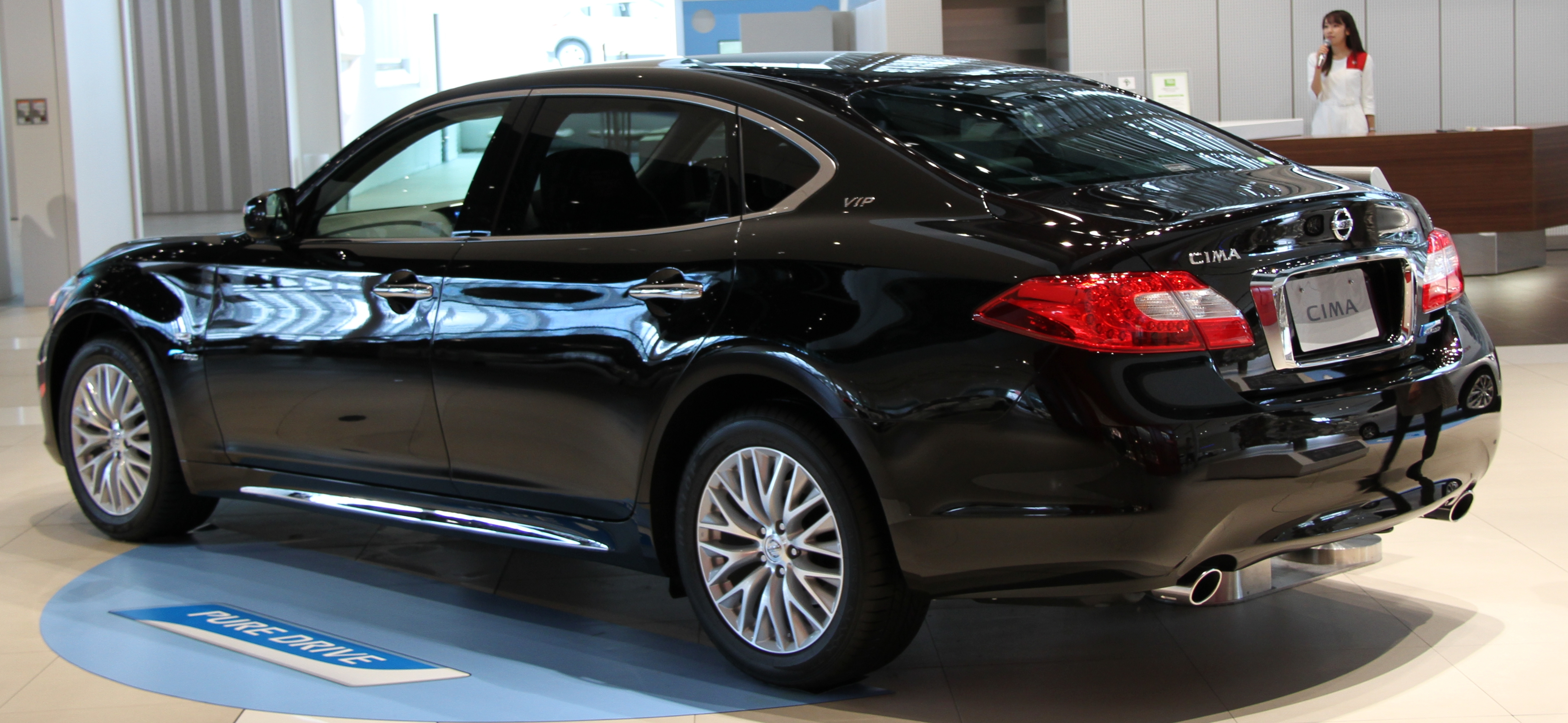
Nissan Cima VIP (HGY51)

Nissan revived the Cima nameplate as the long wheelbase version of the Fuga Hybrid. Instead of a V8 engine, the HGY51 Cima is a hybrid sedan equipped with the 3.5L V6 hybrid VQ engine with maximum power of 225 kW (302 hp; 306 PS) at 6800 rpm and maximum torque of 350 N⋅m (258 lbf⋅ft) at 5000 rpm with an advanced ‘HM34’ electric motor with maximum power output of 50 kW (67 hp; 68 PS) and maximum torque of 270 N⋅m (199 lbf⋅ft) and high-output lithium-ion battery with a quick charge/discharge function. It also comes with Nissan's "Intelligent Dual Clutch Control", a one-motor two-clutch parallel hybrid system, that offers direct response, superb driving feel and low fuel consumption. Sales of this flagship hybrid sedan in Japan began May 21, 2012. It is a resurrection of a 1960s and 1970s styling trend called "coke bottle styling".

The reintroduction of the Cima to Japanese customers was done to offer an alternative to Toyota's limousines called the Century and the S210 series Crown Majesta which the Cima is now the direct alternative.

On April 16, 2014, it was announced that the current Cima will be offered in North America as the Infiniti Q70L beginning with the 2015 model year. A few Cimas were exported to other Asian countries such as Singapore by parallel import.

In 2022, production of the Cima, along with the Fuga, concluded, with no plans for a successor for either model. The car service and executive limousine duties was now offered on the Nissan Elgrand VIP.

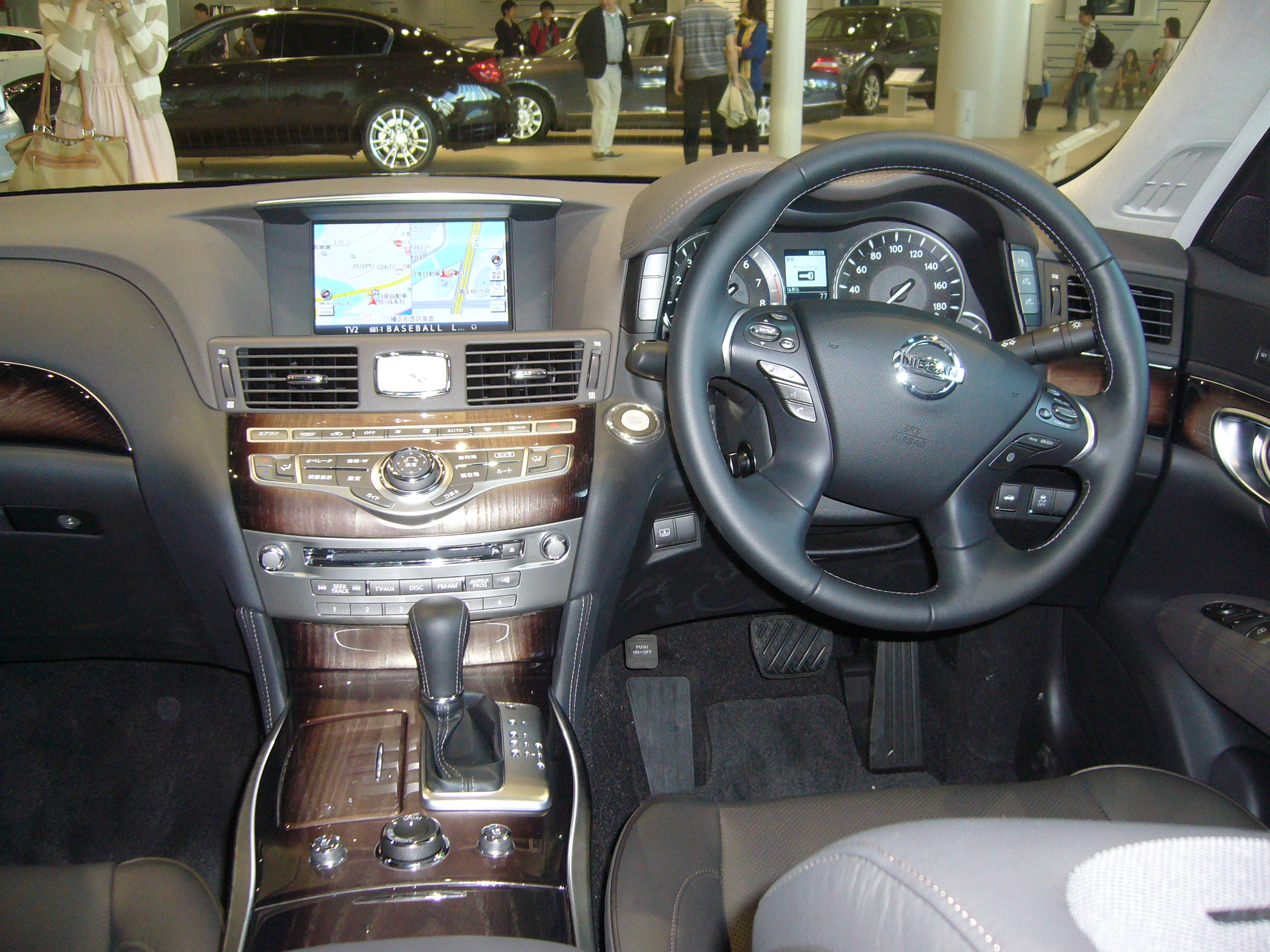
Nissan Cima dashboard

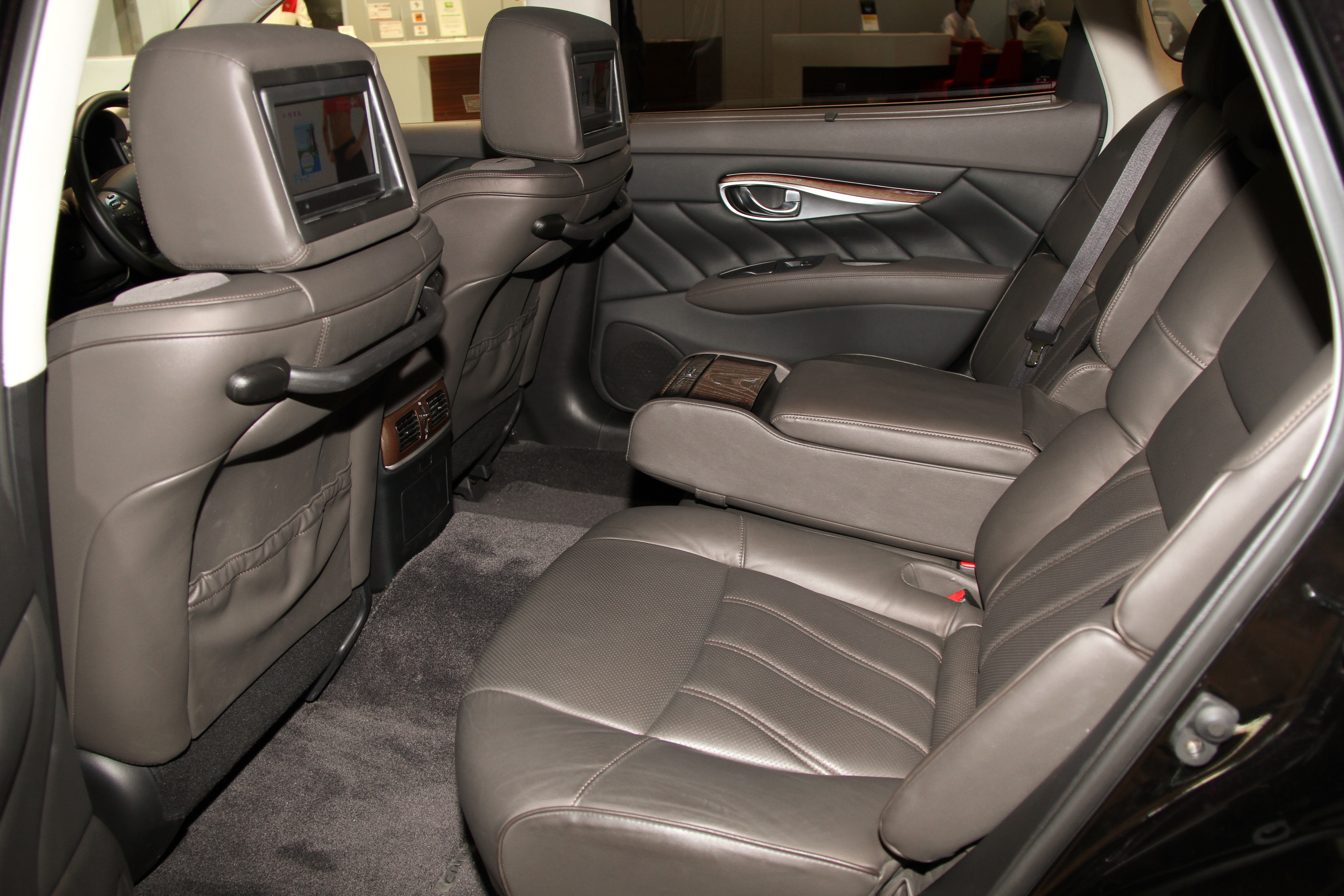
Nissan Cima, rear seat

=== Mitsubishi Dignity ===
From April 26, 2012, until November 30, 2016, Mitsubishi Motors sold a rebadged version of the HGY51 Cima under the Dignity nameplate. Aside from badging and some minor details, the Dignity was identical to the Cima.
