= Infiniti Q70 =

Executive cars by Infiniti (2013–2019)

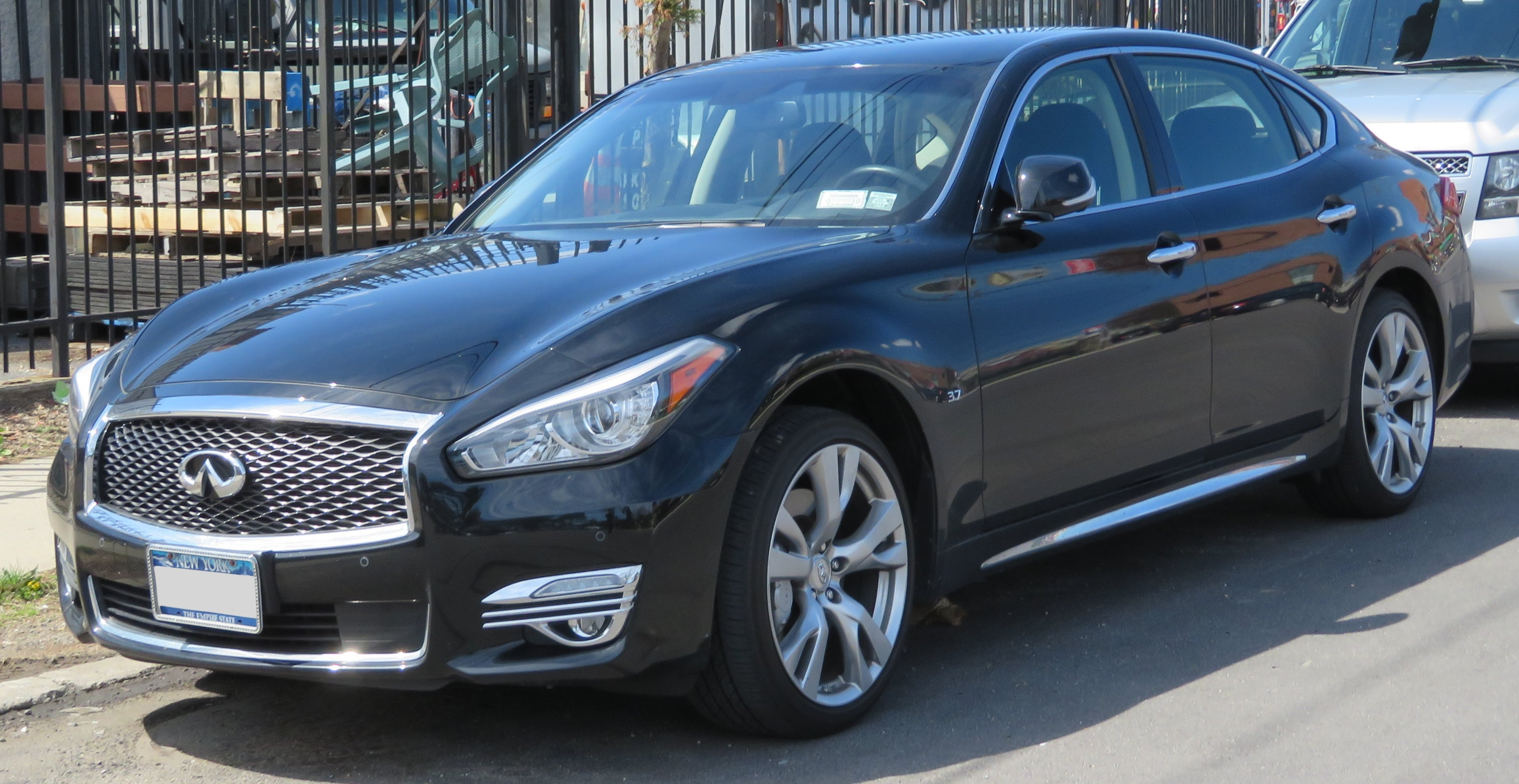

Overview
- Manufacturer: Nissan
- Model code: Y51
- Also called: Infiniti M (2009–2014); Nissan Fuga; Nissan Cima (Q70L); Mitsubishi Proudia; Mitsubishi Dignity (Q70L)
- Production: 2013–2019
- Model years: 2014–2019

Body and chassis
- Class: Executive car
- Body style: 4-door sedan
- Layout: Front engine, rear-wheel drive / All-wheel drive
- Platform: Nissan FM platform

Powertrain
- Engine: gasoline: 2.0 L M274 DE20 AL I4 (China); 2.5 L VQ25HR V6; 3.5 L VQ35HR V6 (hybrid); 3.7 L VQ37VHR V6; 5.6 L VK56VD V8; diesel: 2.2 L Mercedes-Benz OM651 turbo I4; 3.0 L Renault-Nissan V9X turbo V6

Dimensions
- Wheelbase: 2,900 mm (114.2 in); 3,051 mm (120.1 in) (Q70L)
- Length: 4,945 mm (194.7 in); 5,095 mm (200.6 in) (Q70L)
- Width: 1,845 mm (72.6 in)
- Height: 1,509 mm (59.4 in)
- Curb weight: Q70 3.7 RWD/AWD 1,758 / 1,840 kg (3,876 / 4,057 lb); Q70L 3.7 RWD/AWD 1,795 / 1,885 kg (3,957 / 4,156 lb); Q70 5.6 RWD/AWD 1,834 / 1,923 kg (4,043 / 4,239 lb); Q70L 5.6 RWD/AWD 1,873 / 1,971 kg (4,129 / 4,345 lb); 2.2 Diesel 1,896 kg (4,180 lb); 3.5 Hybrid 1,875 kg (4,134 lb)

Chronology
- Predecessor: Infiniti M (renamed from); Infiniti Q45 (Q70L)

The Infiniti Q70 and Q70L is a line of mid-size luxury (executive) cars from Nissan luxury division Infiniti. Essentially an update to the Infiniti M series with minor cosmetic changes, the Q70 name was introduced to reflect Infiniti's updated "Q" nomenclature.

== First generation ==
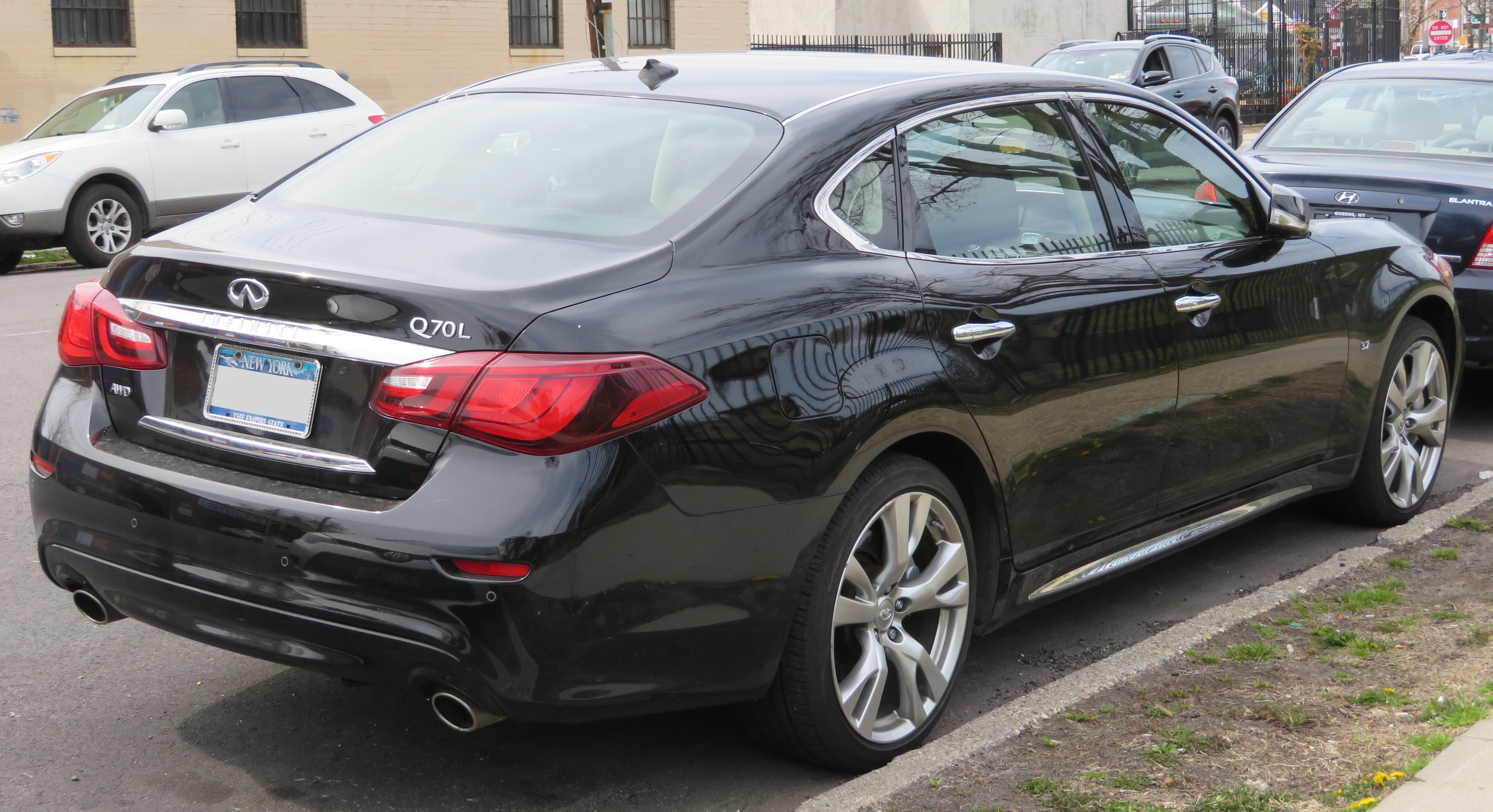
Infiniti Q70L

The Chinese model went on sale in 2012.

In 2013, the entire Infiniti line was renamed, with the M sedans becoming the Q70; this reflected the model's relative position in the Infiniti lineup, rather than the engine displacement as had previously been used.

US models went on sale in 2014 model year vehicles. Early models included 3.7, 3.7 AWD, 5.6, 5.6 AWD, Hybrid.

=== Engines ===
Petrol engines
Model	Years	Type/code	Power, torque at rpm
2.0t	2018–	1,991 cc (121 cu in) I4 turbo (Mercedes-Benz M 274 DE 20 AL)	211 PS (155 kW; 208 hp) at 5500, 350 N⋅m (258 lb⋅ft) at 1250–3500
3.7	2013-	3,696 cc (225.5 cu in) V6 (VQ37VHR)	335 PS (246 kW; 330 hp) at 7000, 366 N⋅m (270 lb⋅ft) at 5200
3.7 AWD	2013-	3,696 cc (225.5 cu in) V6 (VQ37VHR)	335 PS (246 kW; 330 hp) at 7000, 366 N⋅m (270 lb⋅ft) at 5200
5.6	2013-	5,552 cc (338.8 cu in) V8 (VK56VD)	426 PS (313 kW; 420 hp) at 6000, 565 N⋅m (417 lb⋅ft) at 4400
5.6 AWD	2013-	5,552 cc (338.8 cu in) V8 (VK56VD)	426 PS (313 kW; 420 hp) at 6000, 565 N⋅m (417 lb⋅ft) at 4400
Hybrid	2013-	3,498 cc (213.5 cu in) V6 24-valve (VQ35HR)	306 PS (225 kW; 302 hp) at 6800, 350 N⋅m (258 lb⋅ft) at 4800
Hybrid	2013-	electric motor (Nissan HM34)	68 PS (50 kW; 67 hp) at 1770, 290 N⋅m (214 lb⋅ft) at 1770
Hybrid	2013-	combined	365 PS (268 kW; 360 hp) at 6500, 546 N⋅m (403 lb⋅ft)

Diesel engines
Model	Years	Type/code	Power, torque at rpm
3.0d	2013-	2,993 cc (182.6 cu in) V6 Turbo (Renault-Nissan V9X)	238 PS (175 kW; 235 hp) at 3750, 550 N⋅m (406 lb⋅ft) at 1750
2.2d	2015–	2,143 cc (131 cu in) I4 turbo (Mercedes-Benz OM651)	170 PS (125 kW; 168 hp) at 3200, 400 N⋅m (295 lb⋅ft) at 1600

=== Transmissions ===
All models included 7-speed electronically controlled automatic transmission with Adaptive Shift Control (ASC) and manual shift mode.

=== Special editions ===
==== Q70, Q70 Hybrid (2014-) ====
Changes to Q70 include new front and rear fascias, new grille design, Infiniti signature LED headlights, LED taillights, LED fog lights and side rearview mirrors with integrated LED turn signals, 3 new body colours (Hermosa Blue, Chestnut Bronze and Graphite Shadow) with Moonlight White colour including Pearl option, revised interior content and trim, with leatherette replacing leather-appointed seating on base Q70 grades, revised 18-inch aluminum-alloy wheel designs, addition of optional Backup Collision Intervention, standard Active Noise Control noise cancellation, choice of 4 interior colours (Graphite, Stone, Wheat and Java).

Additional changes to Q70 Hybrid include revised 18-inch aluminum-alloy wheel designs, optional Around View Monitor with Moving Object Detection (MOD) and Forward Emergency Braking (FEB).

The vehicle was unveiled in the 2014 New York International Auto Show, followed by the 2014 Paris Motor Show.

US models went on sale 2015 model year vehicles. Early models included 3.7 (335PS), 3.7 AWD (335PS), 5.6 (426PS), 5.6 AWD (426PS), Hybrid.

Deliveries of European models began in December 2014. Early European models included 2.2d, Hybrid.

UK models went on sale in 2015. Early models included 2.2d, 3.7 (320PS), Hybrid (364PS).

==== Q70L, (Y51, 2015-) & Q70L Bespoke Edition Concept ====
The design was based on Nissan Cima.

Changes included redesigned 'sword brow' daytime running lights, 5 extra LED light sources, addition of tail chrome trim, new split rear bumper, semi-aniline leather interior upholstery, silver powder wood veneers, redesigned noise isolation and shock absorption, electromagnet rear doors and trunk, independent rear entertainment system, rear seats with customizable inclines, redesigned centre handle, forward collision warning, backup collision intervention, around view monitor.

Q70L Bespoke Edition (Q70L联袂特别定制版) is a version of Q70L with design from Q80 Inspiration, interior from Q60 Concept, with 4 seats with baste seam leather upholstery.

The vehicles were unveiled in Auto Shanghai 2015.

China models went on sale in Q2 2015.

US models went on sale 2015 model year vehicles. Early models included 3.7 (335PS), 3.7 AWD (335PS), 5.6 (422PS), 5.6 AWD (422PS).

==== 2016 Q70 Premium Select Edition (2015-) ====
The vehicle was unveiled in the 2015 Pebble Beach Concours d'Elegance.

US models went on sale in November 2015 at Infiniti retailers.

== Recalls ==
The 2014 Q70 hybrid vehicles manufactured November 7, 2013, to December 10, 2013 were recalled due to damaged housings could crack and fracture, creating road debris and disabling the vehicle and increasing the risk of a crash. In addition, 2014 Q70 hybrid vehicles manufactured November 7, 2013, to May 7, 2014 were recalled due to a software error, the electric motor may stop working while the vehicle is being driven using the electric motor only, leading to increase the risk of a crash.

The 2014–15 Infiniti Q70 was recalled due to fuel pressure sensors not being sufficiently tightened during production, leading to possible fuel leak.

== Discontinuation ==
In 2019, Nissan confirmed that the Infiniti Q70, Q70L, Q30, and QX30 models will be discontinued after the 2019 model year due to poor sales as people in Canada, Mexico, and the United States prefer to purchase crossovers and SUVs instead of sedans, hatchbacks, estates, convertibles, and coupes. Another reason for the discontinuation is also caused by Nissan's plans to withdraw the Infiniti brand from the Australian, New Zealand, South Korean, Hong Kong, Macau, Vietnamese, Indonesian, Malaysian, Singaporean, and West European markets by the end of 2020, with Nissan already withdrawing the Infiniti brand from the South African market in 2017 due to losses and poor sales. Nissan has no plans of abandoning sedans entirely and plans on possibly introducing an Infiniti EV vehicle in 2021 for the 2022 model year based from QS Inspiration concept.

The Q70L continues to be offered in the Chinese market as of 2022.

== Sales by calendar year ==
Year	U.S. Sales	Canada Sales
2013	5,283	249
2014	5,034	128
2015	8,449	217
2016	5,872	156
2017	5,772	66
2018	4,479	53
2019	2,552	56
