= Nissan LL platform =

Japanese automobile platform

The Nissan LL platform is a rear-wheel drive and all-wheel drive automobile platform made by Nissan. Vehicles built on this platform share floor panel and functional assemblies such as the engine, transmission and chassis components attached to it. It was used on luxury sedans before being discontinued in 2010.

== Models ==
- Y34 Nissan Cedric
- Y34 Nissan Gloria
- Y34 Infiniti M45
- F50 Nissan Cima
- F50 Nissan President
- F50 Infiniti Q45
