= Infiniti Q45 =

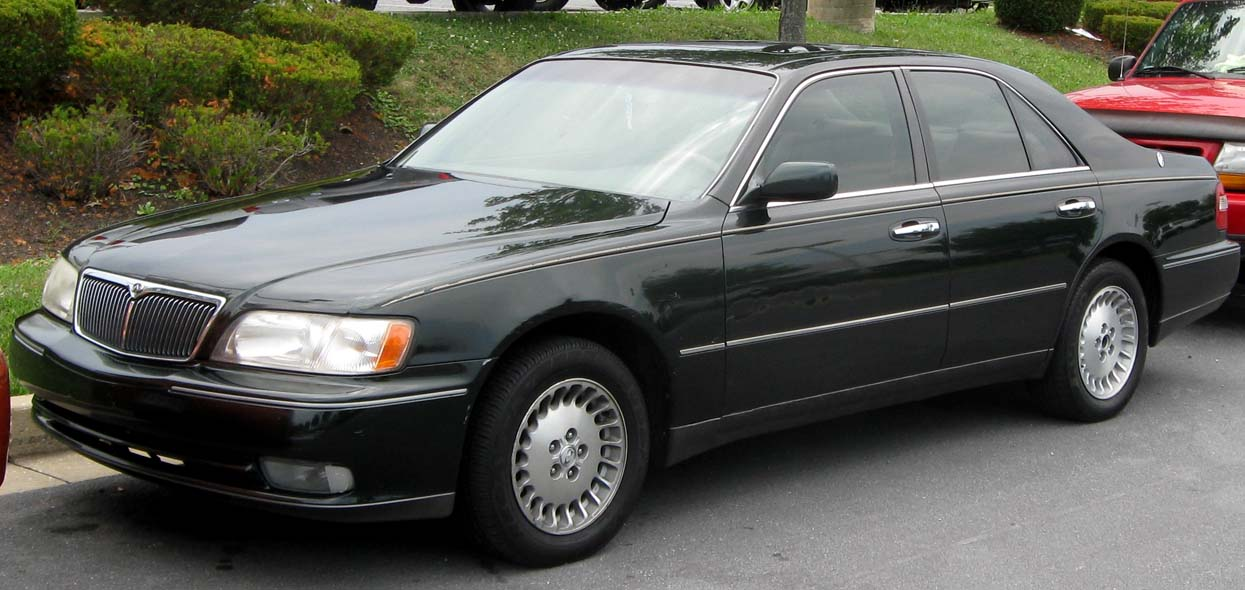
- Infiniti Q45 (Y33) in the USA

Overview
- Manufacturer: Nissan
- Production: August 1989 – 2006
- Model years: 1990–2006
- Assembly: Japan: Kaminokawa, Tochigi

Body and chassis
- Class: Full-size luxury car (F)
- Body style: 4-door sedan
- Layout: Front-engine, rear-wheel-drive
- Related: Nissan President

Chronology
- Successor: Infiniti Q70L

The Infiniti Q45 is a full-size luxury sedan (F-segment in Europe) that was marketed by the Infiniti division of Nissan from the 1990 to 2006 model years. The inaugural product line and flagship sedan of the brand, the Q45 competed directly against the Acura Legend and Lexus LS 400, as multiple Japanese automobile manufacturers began to establish dedicated luxury-vehicle brands in North America during the late 1980s.

As with the Lexus LS, the Q45 also competed against the BMW 7-Series and Mercedes-Benz S-Class, matching them closely in size. Three generations of the model line were produced. The first generation (G50; 1990–1996) was developed specifically for Infiniti; a long-wheelbase version with Nissan President was developed from it. The second generation (Y33; 1997–2000) became a rebranded version of the Nissan Cima (a longer-wheelbase version of the Nissan Cedric/Gloria). The third and final generation (F50; 2002–2006) was again derived from the Cima, again sharing a platform with the President.

After the 2006 model year, Infiniti discontinued the Q45 as it shifted its strategy towards higher-performance vehicles, with the Nissan Fuga-based Infiniti M becoming its new flagship sedan. In 2013, Infiniti revised its branding, with all of its cars adopting the Q from the Q45 (SUVs becoming QX), with engine-displacement nomenclature replaced by a two-digit number relative to its place in the Infiniti model range.

From 1989 to 2006, Nissan produced the Infiniti Q45 in its Kaminokawa, Tochigi facility.

== First generation (G50; 1989) ==
First generation
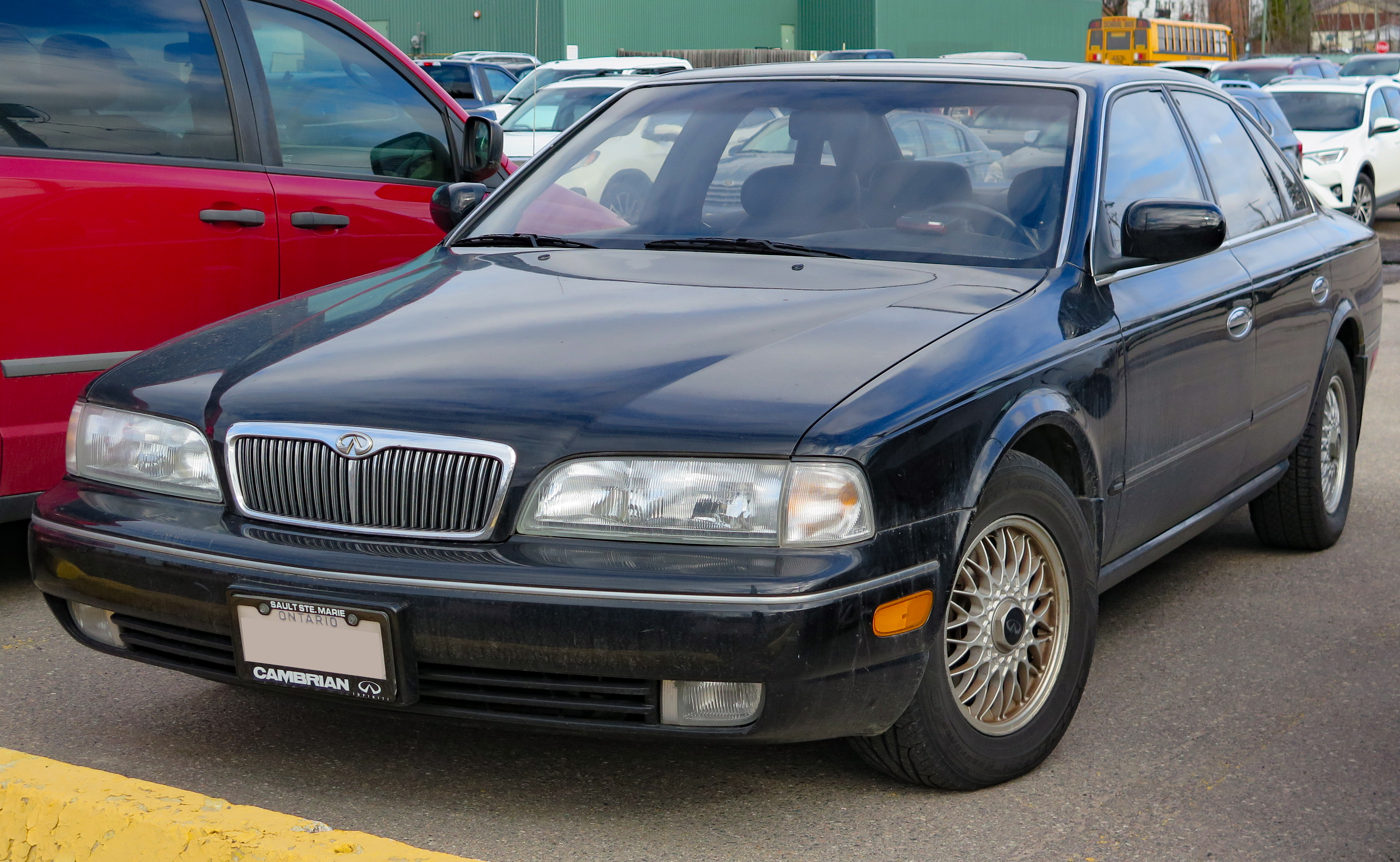
- 1994-1996 facelifted version

Overview
- Model code: G50
- Also called: Nissan Infiniti Q45 (Japan and Australia)
- Production: August 1989 – June 1996
- Model years: 1990–1996
- Designer: Shunji Yamanaka (1987)

Body and chassis
- Related: Nissan President

Powertrain
- Engine: 4.5L VH45DE V8
- Transmission: 4–speed automatic

Dimensions
- Wheelbase: 1990–91: 2,875 mm (113.2 in); 1992–96: 2,880 mm (113.4 in)
- Length: 5,090 mm (200.4 in)
- Width: 1,825 mm (71.9 in)
- Height: 1990–1993: 1,430 mm (56.3 in); 1994–1996: 1,425 mm (56.1 in)
- Curb weight: 1,780–1,840 kg (3,924–4,057 lb)

The first generation Q45 came to market in August 1989 as a 1990 model with a high-output 4.5-liter VH45DE DOHC 32V V8 engine rated at 278 hp (207 kW) and 292 lb⋅ft (396 N⋅m) in North American trim. All Q45s included a viscous limited-slip differential and a multi-link suspension at the front and rear. Nissan chose to position it as a luxurious performance sedan, installing technology that would achieve this purpose, and used the letter "Q" from the western tradition of the Q-car meant to imply that its unassuming appearance hid its performance capabilities. At launch, the US$38,000 (equivalent to $99,000 in 2025) sedan had a single option, the Touring Package, which added Nissan's Super HICAS four-wheel steering system, a decklid spoiler, and alloy wheels.

In Japan, it was sold as the Nissan Infiniti Q45 beginning in November 1989. The model was exclusive to Nissan Prince Store locations, as its later platform twin, the President, was exclusive to Nissan Motor Store locations. The G50 chassis continued production in Japan until 2002 as the President in both regular and extended-wheelbase versions. The Japanese version had many options that never appeared on the North American G50. The Infiniti Q45 was positioned above the Y31 Cima, but below the President.

The contemporary upstart luxury marque Lexus (Toyota) had managed to challenge the established dominance of European full-size luxury cars with the LS 400, so the Q45 seemed poised for similar success with comparable specifications and price to the LS 400 while featuring more emphasis upon handling. However, the Q45 did not achieve similar sales volumes, which was attributed to the car's unconventional styling, particularly the grille and lack of interior woodgrain or chrome trim. There was also an unusual advertising campaign which did not include actual photos or information about the car. By 1995, the price had risen to US$54,000 (equivalent to $114,000 in 2025), slowing sales.

In 1993 the Infiniti brand was launched in Australia with the sole model on offer being the Q45. With a price of A$140,000, the Q45 sold poorly and the brand was subsequently withdrawn from the market in 1996.

=== Design ===
According to the design team, the Q45 was meant to "express the Japanese concept of luxury" by incorporating traditional Japanese craftsmanship; as initially released, there was no front grille and no wood paneling on the dashboard. Nissan received assistance from Poltrona Frau for the minimalist interior. A grille was added in 1993 and interior wood had appeared by 1995.

Nissan had launched a program called the "901 Movement" or "901 Activity" in 1985, with the goal of "realizing the No. 1 operating performance in the world by 1990", making Nissan's the best handling lineup in the industry. Other vehicles resulting from the "901" program included the 300ZX (Z32), Primera (P10), Silvia (S13), and Skyline (R32); the multi-link suspension of the Q45 was derived from the Z32.

In 1989 (as a 1990 model) "Full-Active Suspension" was introduced with the Q45a model, which employed 10 sensors sending signals to microprocessor-controlled one-way hydraulic actuators at each wheel, designed to reduce body roll, dive, and pitch. The suspension provides an active response to road features up to approximately 3 Hz, a limit imposed by minimizing the size of the additional hardware and power losses required to pressurize the hydraulic accumulator; it added 202 lb (92 kg) and reduced fuel economy by 10%. The system was brought to the United States starting in 1990 for the 1991 model year. At about the same time, Toyota marketed a limited-production Celica Active Sports (ST183) in Japan with its Toyota Active Control Suspension. Mercedes-Benz also developed a similar system named Active Body Control, which was introduced a decade later in 1999 on the C215 CL-Class.

The Q45t model added Nissan's Super HICAS four wheel steering system and firmer suspension. A trunklid spoiler was included, reducing drag. However, HICAS was deleted for the 1995 Q45t.

=== Equipment ===
Standard equipment included a Bose sound system, leather interior, power adjustable front passenger seats with two position memory feature that also electrically adjusted the steering wheel, exterior mirrors, one-touch power windows, digital climate control, and keyless entry system.

Revisions in 1993 included 17:1 steering (except on the Q45t, which retained the original 15.1:1 ratio), lower ratio 1st and 2nd gears, and a dynamically smooth suspension, thicker glass, keyless remote, auto-dim rear-view mirror, dipping side view mirrors, revised transmission heat exchanger and external ATF filter, revised oval intake ports and revised disc injectors, fog lights and metal-backed camshaft timing chain guides.

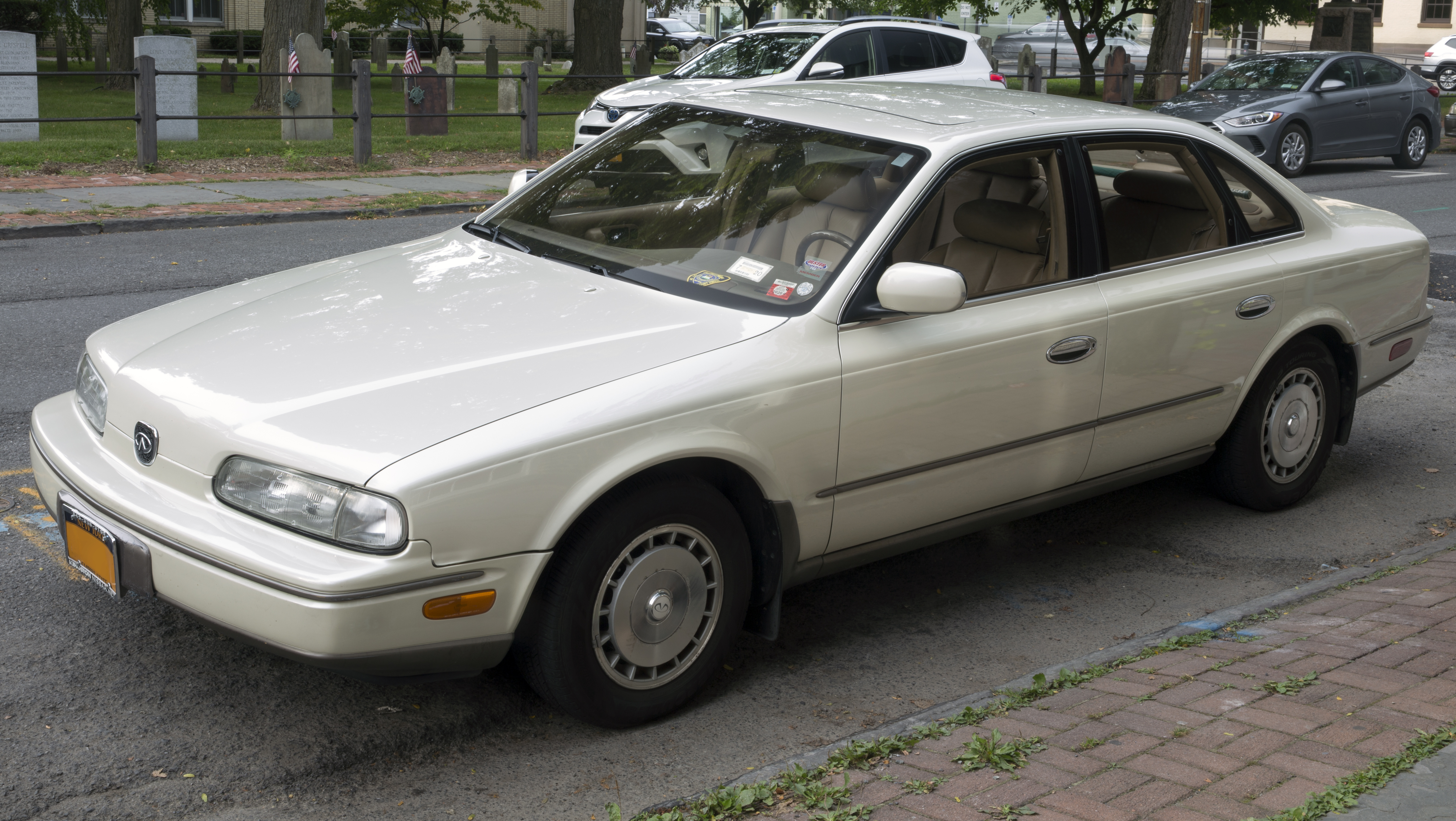
1990–93 (pre-facelift, with cloisonné front insignia)

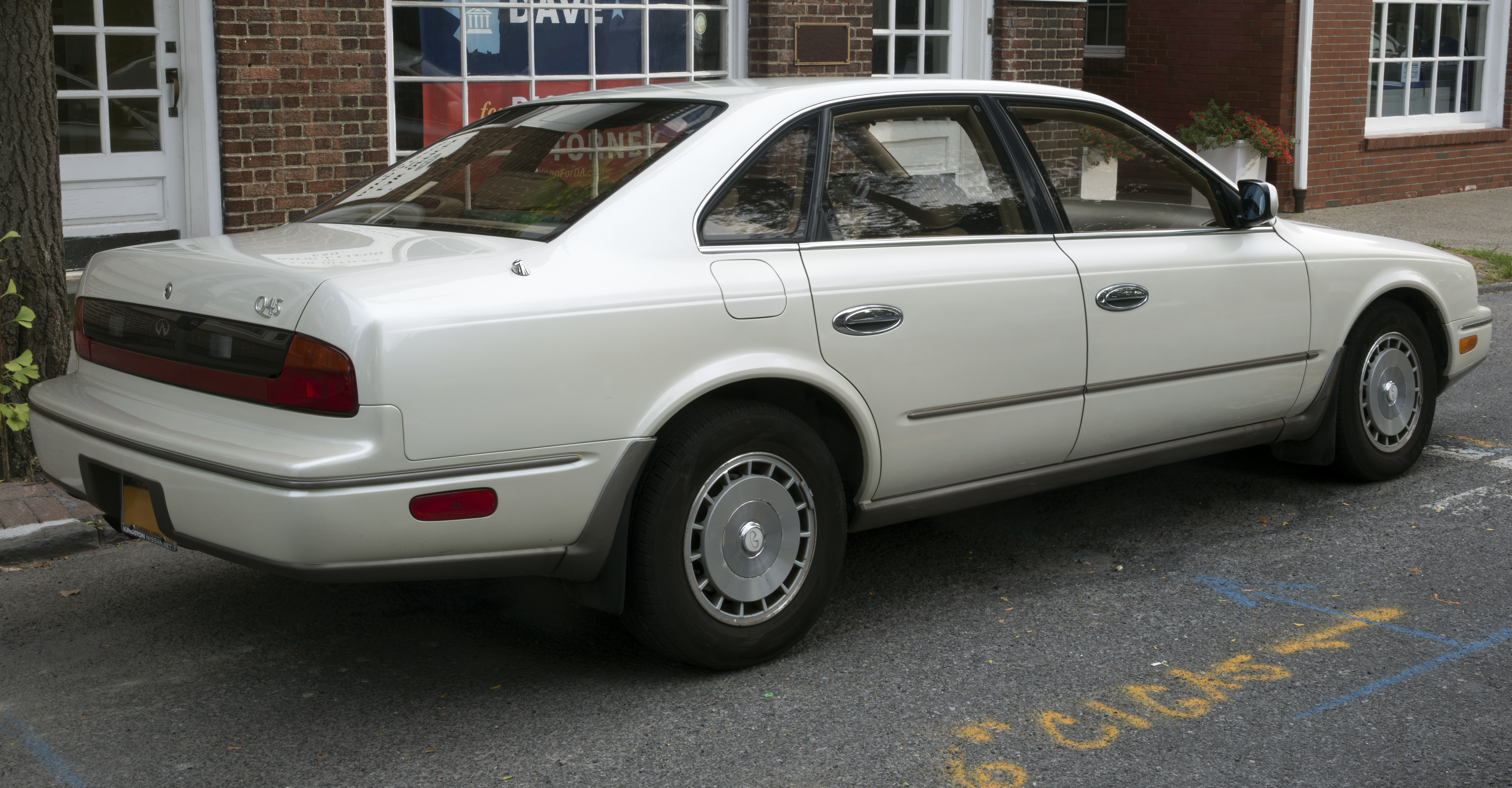
1990–93, rear view

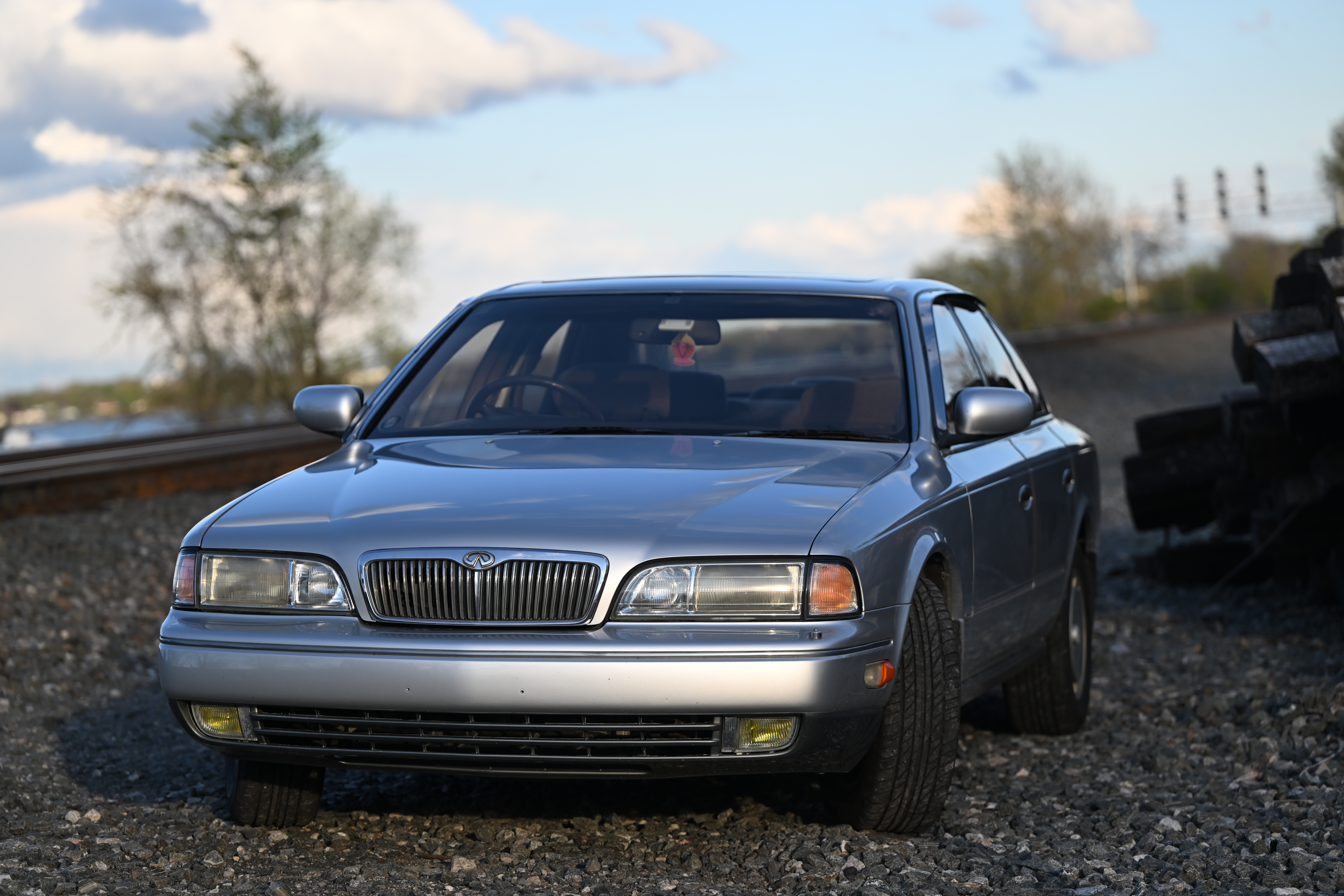
1994–96 (JDM)

=== Models ===
Infiniti offered the Q45 in three trim levels: base, Q45t, and Q45a. All models featured a multi-link suspension at both the front and rear wheels, and the Q45t and Q45a added a rear stabilizer bar, with the Q45a model being larger in diameter; both models have a 1 mm smaller in diameter front sway bar, rear spoiler, BBS forged alloy wheels, 4-wheel steering.

Externally, the 1994 and later model year Q45 can be distinguished by a chrome grille. HICAS and the faster steering ratios was discontinued in the 1995 Q45t model and the Q45a model was not imported in 1996. 1996 models do not feature variable valve timing like the 1990-1995 models do. OBD-II was added for the 1996 model year.

== Second generation (Y33; 1997) ==
Second generation
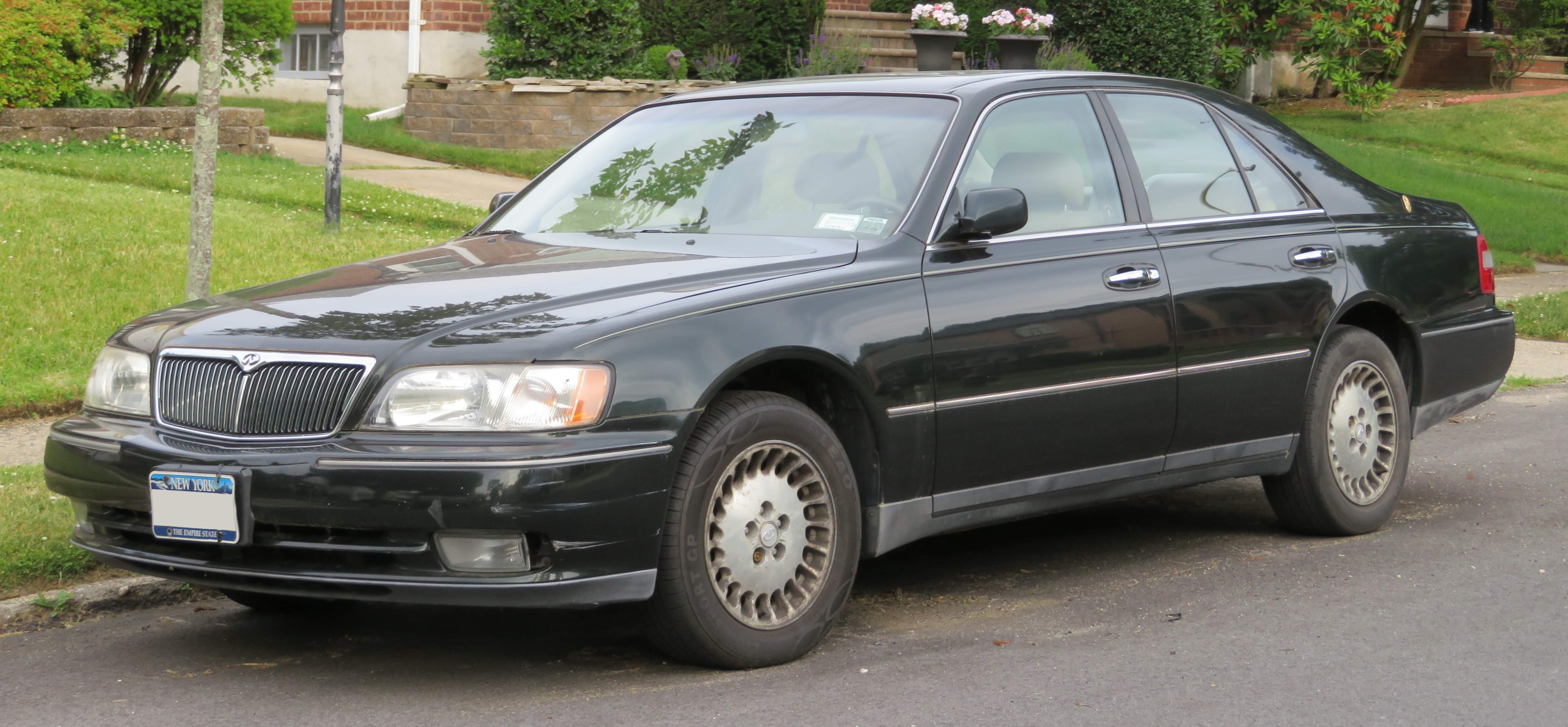
- 1997 Infiniti Q45 (Y33) in the USA

Overview
- Model code: Y33
- Also called: Nissan Cima
- Production: July 1996 – December 2000
- Model years: 1997 – 2001
- Designer: Itaru Sugino (1993)

Body and chassis
- Related: Nissan Cedric Y33; Nissan Gloria Y33; Nissan Leopard Y33

Powertrain
- Engine: 4.1 L VH41DE V8
- Transmission: 4-speed automatic with manual shift

Dimensions
- Wheelbase: 2,830 mm (111.4 in)
- Length: 1996-99: 5,056 mm (199.1 in); 2000-01: 5,069 mm (199.6 in)
- Width: 1,820 mm (71.7 in)
- Height: 2000-01: 1,445 mm (56.9 in); 1996-99: 1,450 mm (57.1 in)

The second generation Q45 was a lightly revised variant of the Nissan Cima for the Japanese domestic market, which shared a common platform with the Cedric / Gloria (Y33 generation). For most of its vehicles, Infiniti uses a naming convention that combined a letter indicating the series or market position, followed by a two-digit number for engine displacement; for instance, the first generation Q45 (G50) name designates the flagship (Q-series) followed by 45 for its 4.5-liter V8; the second-generation Q45 was an exception (as was the QX4, derived from the contemporary Nissan Pathfinder), as it used a smaller 252 cu in (4.1 L) VH41DE engine.

=== Design ===
Styling featured an inverse curve C-pillar, and a pronounced full-length horizontal character beltline. Despite the shorter wheelbase in the Y33 compared to the G50, rear legroom increased by 3.9 in (99 mm); however, the trunk was faulted by owners as being small, with a volume of 12.6 ft^{3} (360 L). Standard features for the second-generation Q45 included traction control, leather interior with faux wood trim, single (later dual) zone climate control, Bose audio system with eight speakers and in-dash single disc CD player, auto dimming rear view mirror, automatic light on and delay off timer, steering wheel-mounted cruise control and head unit controls. Also standard was a memory system for the driver's seat and steering wheel. Available options included an integrated satellite navigation system, 6-disc CD autochanger and heated seats.

The touring package, again badged as the Q45t, featured 17-inch wheels and tires, electronically modulated performance-tuned suspension, blackout grille, blackout headlight treatment, and performance style steering wheel.

The front suspension was changed to a MacPherson strut; rear suspension was similar to the G50, using a multilink design. The second generation Q45 (Y33) was equipped with a viscous LSD and electronic traction control as standard features. Compared to the first generation (G50), the Y33 was approximately 200 lb (91 kg) lighter, and the steering ratio was slowed further, from 17.0:1 to 18.5:1. As Edmunds noted for the 1997 model year, "The Q45 no longer has aspirations to be a sport sedan, its prime duties now are interstate cruising."

=== Performance ===
The Q45 (Y33) equipped with the VH41DE producing 267 hp (199 kW) and 278 lb⋅ft (377 N⋅m) was able to accelerate from 0 to 60 mph (97 km/h) in approximately 7.5 seconds.

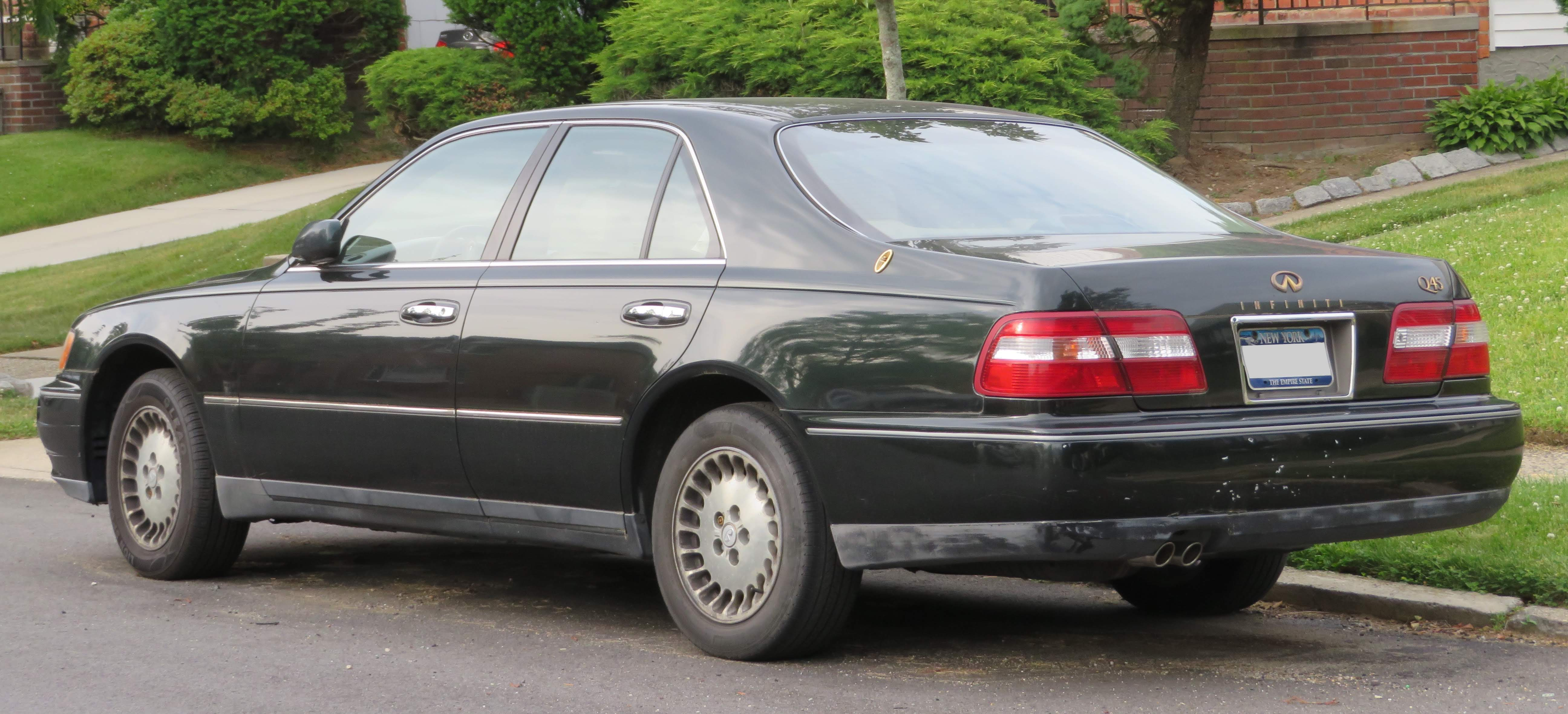
1997–1998 Q45, rear

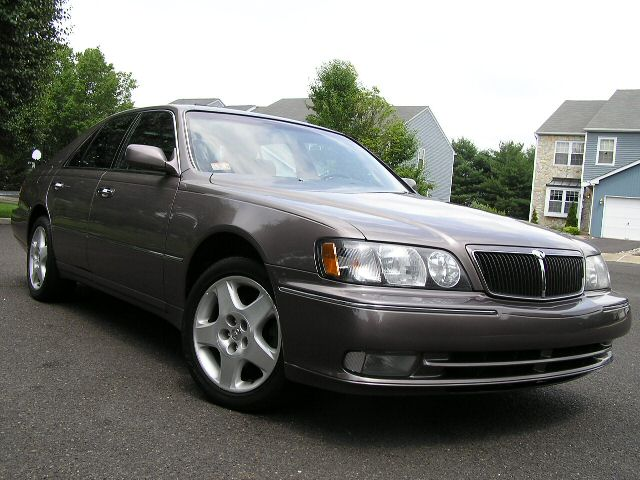
1999–2001, updated front (Q45t pictured with five-spoke alloy wheels)

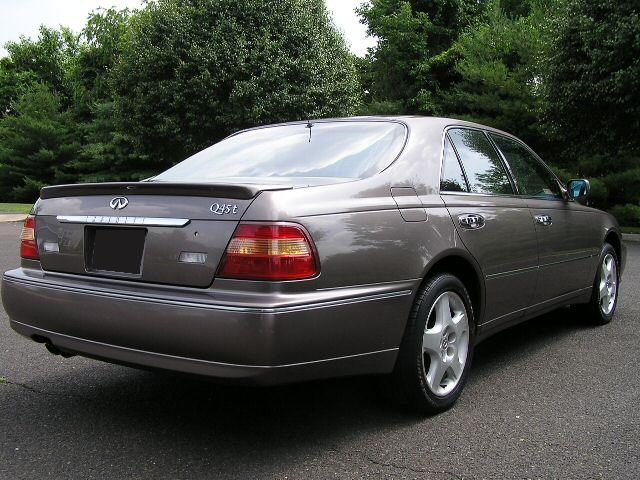
1999–2001, updated rear (Q45t pictured with decklid spoiler)

=== Updates ===
The Q45 front and rear fascias were slightly revised for 1999; HID headlights and an analog clock became standard equipment. Five-spoke 17" aluminum alloy wheels and an electronic adjustable suspension became standard on the Q45t.

The Q45 Anniversary Edition, limited to 3,000 units, offered highest trim level available for the second-generation Q45, available on 2000 models and standard on the 2001 models. The package included all features of the Q45t model along with "Anniversary Edition" markings on the tailgate badge, ignition key, front seat embossing and floor mats as well as genuine wood trim, wood tone/leather steering wheel, special bright machine finish 17-inch performance wheels and exclusive body color door handles.

1998. New front seatbelt pretensioners, mechanical odometer replaced with a liquid crystal display unit from January 1998 production.
1999. New standard features included power rear-window sunshade, power trunklid pull-down, and high-intensity xenon gas headlights. Taillights were removed from the boot lid. Touring edition (Q45t) gained dual-mode electronically controlled shock absorbers.
2000. New active front head restraints; rear child-seat anchors; one-touch open/close operation for the standard moonroof and all power windows. A newly optional nav system with dashboard touch-screen replaced a simpler, non-video system. The 10th Anniversary Touring edition had machine-finish wheels, special badges and upholstery, wood/leather steering wheel, and bird's-eye maple interior accents. New platinum-tip spark plugs.
2001. Body-color door handles, bird's-eye maple interior trim, and a leather/simulated-wood steering wheel were the only changes for 2001.

== Third generation (F50; 2001) ==
Third generation
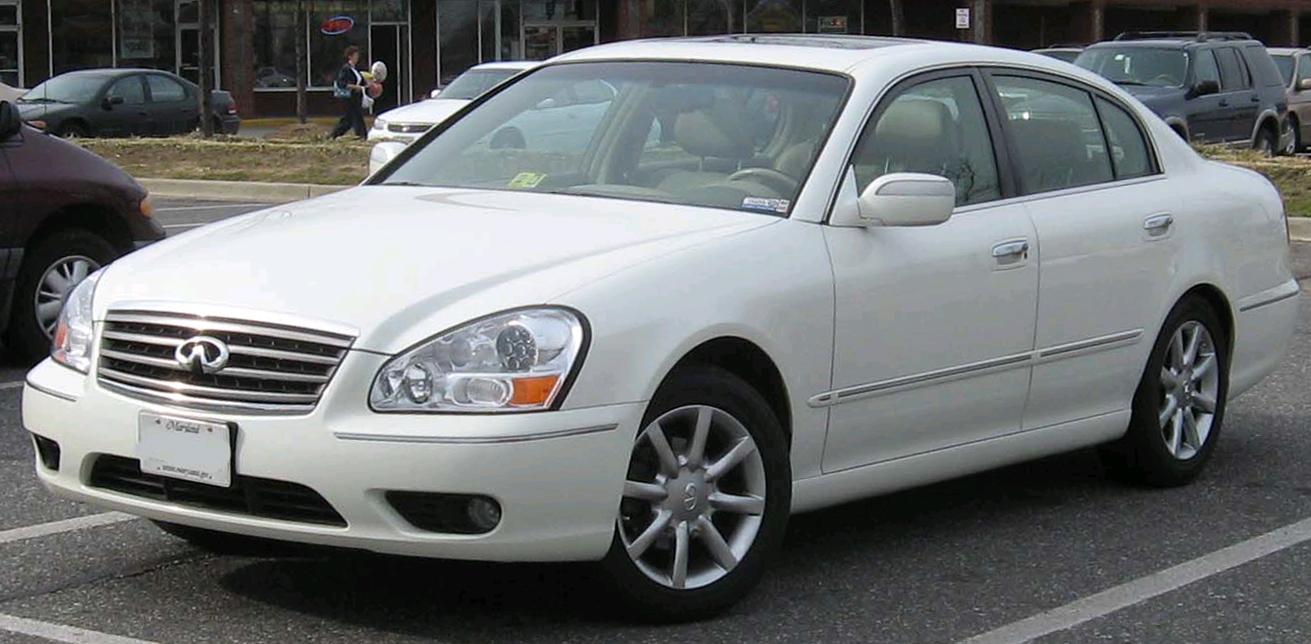
- 2005–2006 Q45

Overview
- Model code: F50
- Production: January 2001 – 2006; 2001 – 2008 (Middle East); 2005–2008 (South Korea)
- Model years: 2002–2006
- Designer: Mamoru Aoki (1998); Yasuhiro Tani (facelift: 2003)

Body and chassis
- Platform: Nissan LL platform
- Related: Nissan Cima/Nissan President

Powertrain
- Engine: 4.5 L VK45DE V8
- Transmission: 5-speed automatic

Dimensions
- Wheelbase: 2,870 mm (113.0 in)
- Length: 2001-04: 5,069 mm (199.6 in); 2004-06: 5,101 mm (200.8 in)
- Width: 1,844 mm (72.6 in)
- Height: 2001-04: 1,495 mm (58.9 in); 2004-06: 1,490 mm (58.7 in)
- Curb weight: 3,900 lb (1,769 kg)

Introduced at the 2000 New York Auto Show, the third generation Q45 (F50) was, like the preceding Q45 (Y33), based on the JDM Cima and was powered by a new twin-cam 4.5 L VK45DE V8 engine using a 5-speed automatic transmission with overdrive. Marketing began in April 2001, for the 2002 model year, at a starting MSRP of US$50,500 (equivalent to $91,800 in 2025). The Q45 was noted for its distinctive "gatling gun" style HID headlights with 11 bulbs on each side, including seven for the HID low-beam xenon headlights.

At its introduction, Brock Yates, writing for Car and Driver, compared the third generation Q45 against close market competitors (in terms of price, which are in the mid-luxury or executive car category with V8 engines, such as the Audi A6 and Lexus GS), calling it a "superbly refined, comfortable, and distinctive machine."

=== Design and features ===
Development began in 1996, with exterior designs by Mamori Aoki frozen in 1998 and patented in March 2000. Aoki said the styling was meant to evoke "a driver's car, not a chauffeur-driven limousine."

Assembled In Tochigi, Japan, the third generation Q45 (F50) was wider, with a longer wheelbase and a 5 ft^{3} (0.14 m^{3}) larger interior volume than its prior generation (Y33). Torsional rigidity was improved by 40%. The suspension used front struts and multi-link rear, with anti-roll bars front and rear.

The third generation Q45 was the first Infiniti with a laser-based autonomous cruise control system. Standard equipment included a leather interior, power sunroof, 8-way power front seats, remote keyless entry, rain-detecting wipers, tire pressure monitoring system and side curtain airbags. The center console features two sizes of concealed cup holders and a hatch under the armrest and a second, deeper compartment. Standard electronics include: CD, 8 speaker Bose audio system, trip computer, rear view parking camera system, and voice-activated navigation system with plan (standard map-like view) and bird's eye (three-dimensional) display modes. The voice recognition, by Visteon, is trained to recognize 50,000 words in 150 dialects. The 2002 Q45 was the first vehicle ever to offer voice-controlled navigation and a reverse parking camera outside Japan, following the JDM 1991 Toyota Soarer. Bodywork seated five passengers with an aerodynamic drag coefficient of 0.30.

The optional Premium Package included adjustable suspension, 18-inch 8-spoke titanium-color sport alloy wheels, 245/45R18 V-rated tires, rear monitor, rear power sunshade and rear door manual sunshades, climate controlled front seats with heating and cooling functions and perforated leather inserts, navigation system with 7.0-inch LCD, Intelligent Cruise Control, satellite radio, auto open/close trunk, heated power-reclining rear seats with memory, rear controls for audio and HVAC and rear HVAC vents in B-pillar and front seatback grips — and available chrome-finished 18-inch wheels in place of the titanium wheels.

=== Performance ===
The VK45DE has a maximum output of 340 hp (254 kW) and 333 lb⋅ft (451 N⋅m), motivating the Q45 (F50) sedan from 0 to 60 mph (97 km/h) in 6.0 seconds.

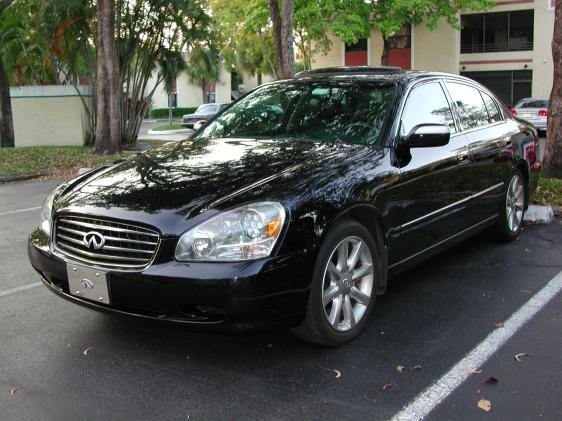
2002–2004 Q45

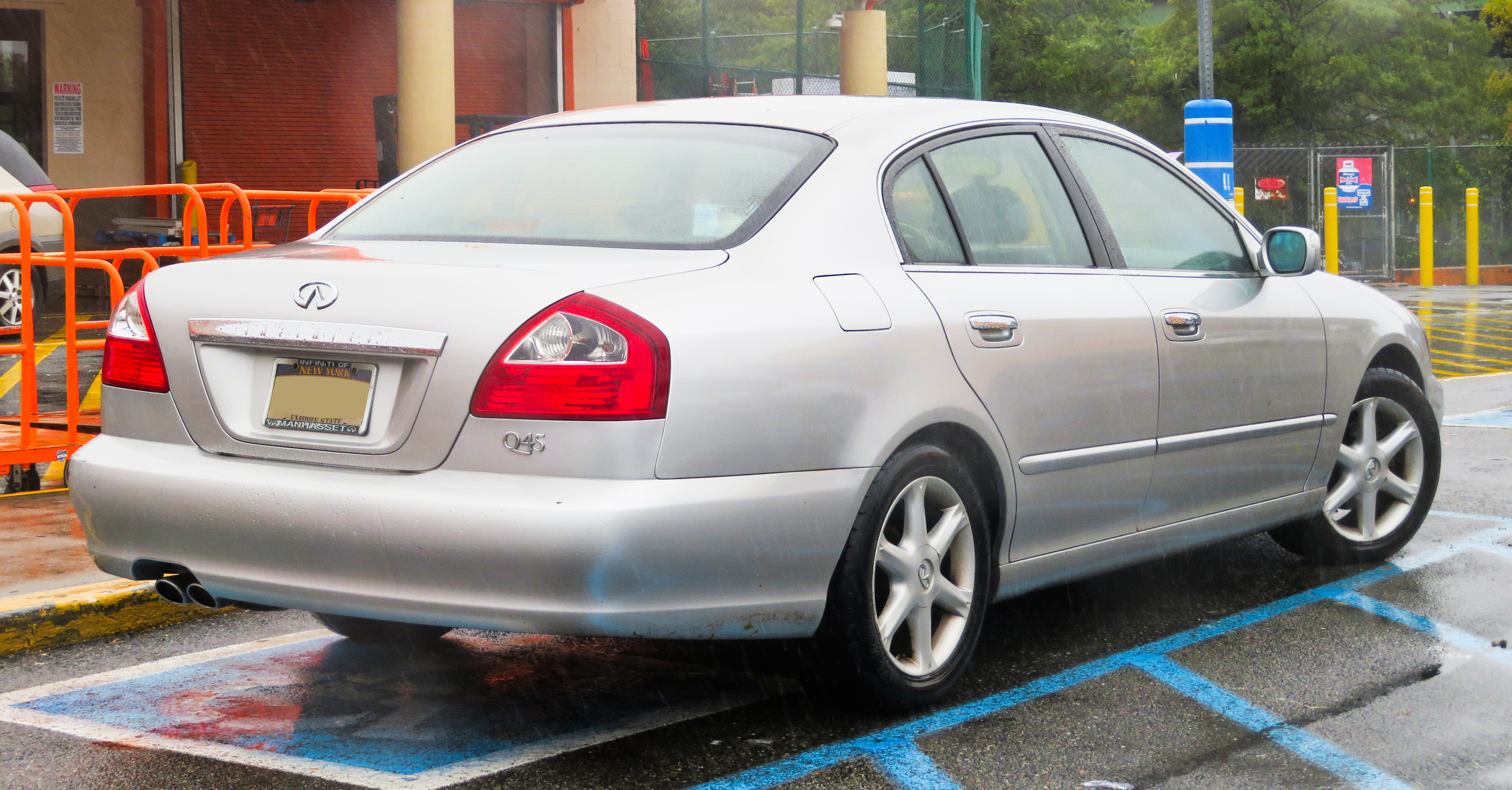
2002–2004 Q45, rear view (F50; pre-facelift)

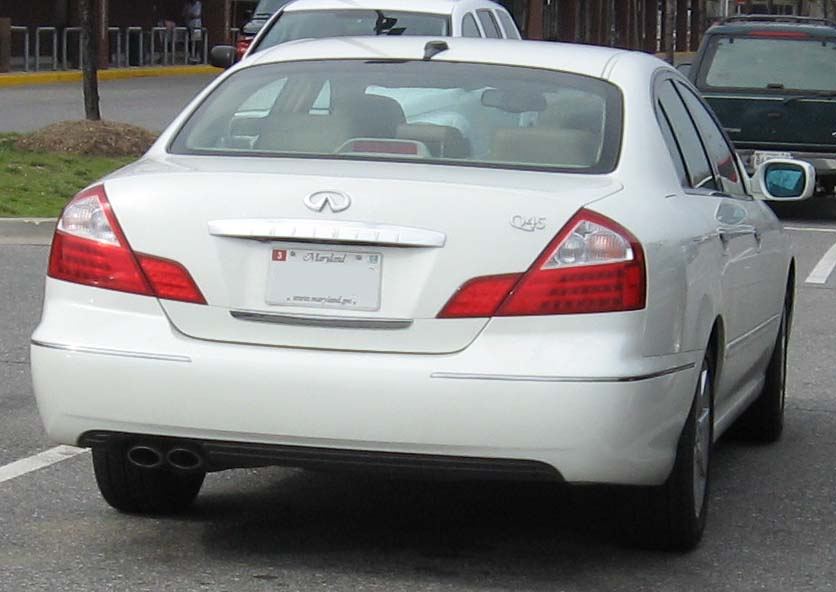
2005–2006, rear view

=== Updates ===
The 2003 model received a revised security system, numerically higher final drive ratio (for better acceleration - decreased highway fuel economy), reprogrammed TCU, and a mid-year satellite radio option. The CD changer could load CDs directly at the dashboard head unit.

For 2005, the Q45 received a mild facelift, with revised front and rear fascias; hood; grille; trunk decklid and finisher; headlights; side, front and rear chrome accent trim; and integrated fog lights and LED taillights. The interior featured re-contoured double-stitched seating, all white luminescent gauge markings, genuine metal knobs for accessory controls, a darker shade of maple interior trim, recalibrated transmission and new 17" alloy wheels. 1,129 Q45s were sold in the United States for 2005.

== Replacement ==
Infiniti discontinued marketing the Q45 in the USA after the 2006 model year, its flagship position assumed by a newly redesigned Infiniti M35/45, an mid-luxury (executive) car shorter in length than the Q45, though with greater interior room and performance, as well as featuring a rear multilink suspension and front double wishbone.

A new Infiniti flagship was anticipated by the end of the 2000s decade. According to Mark Igo, the general manager of Infiniti North America, "the new Q will make the brand better, but it is questionable whether it will be very profitable".

Infiniti introduced the next iteration of its flagship, the Y51 series Infiniti M37/56/Nissan Fuga in November 2009. Continuing as a mid-luxury car, the new Infiniti M is only 50 mm (2.0 in) shorter than the final generation Q45, with the same width dimensions of 1,845 mm (6.1 ft) and height of 1,515 mm (5.0 ft) compared to the F50 series Cima of 1,490 mm (4.9 ft) height.

By August 2010, the Nissan Cima, on which the final generation Q45 essentially was based, had been discontinued in Japan, along with its Nissan President sibling. This made the second generation Nissan Fuga the marque's top-of-the-line flagship sedan. When the Fuga assumed the role as Nissan's flagship sedan, it became the first time that they didn't sell a premium luxury V8 sedan in Japan, although the Fuga's North American cousin, the Infiniti M56, is offered with a V8 shared with the Infiniti QX56.

In May 2012, Nissan released a new version of the Cima in Japan, based on the Fuga Hybrid (Infiniti M35h).

On 17 December 2012, Infiniti announced that all of its future sedan offerings will use the Q prefix, starting from the Q50 as a G37 replacement, Q70 for its M35/45/56 replacement, and a rumored Q80 for the new flagship model.

== Sales ==
=== Sales ===
Calendar Year	United States
1989	1,072
1990	13,938
1991	14,623
1992	12,216
1993	12,294
1994	11,419
1995	7,803
1996	5,896
1997	10,443
1998	8,244
1999	6,271
2000	4,178
2001	5,762
2002	3,717
2003	2,440
2004	1,972
2005	1,129
2006	393
2007	22 (leftover 2006 models)
Sales Total	123,832
