= Nissan VH engine =

Engine series by Nissan

Nissan VH
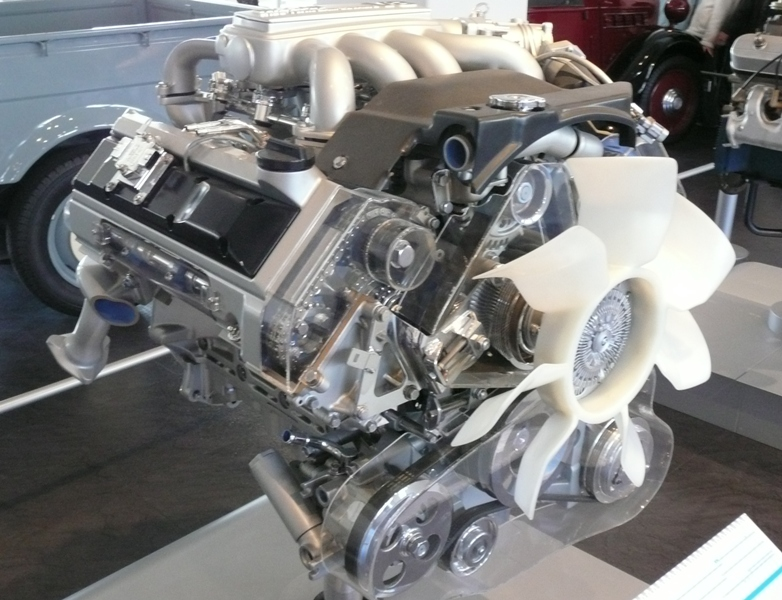

Overview
- Manufacturer: Nissan (Nissan Machinery)
- Production: 1989–2001

Layout
- Configuration: Naturally aspirated 90° V8
- Displacement: 4.1 L (4,130 cc); 4.5 L (4,494 cc)
- Cylinder bore: 93 mm (3.66 in)
- Piston stroke: 82.7 mm (3.26 in); 76 mm (2.99 in)
- Cylinder block material: Aluminium
- Cylinder head material: Aluminium
- Valvetrain: DOHC 4 valves x cyl. w/VTC
- Compression ratio: 10.2:1

RPM range
- Max. engine speed: 6900

Combustion
- Fuel system: Fuel injection
- Fuel type: Gasoline
- Cooling system: Water cooled

Output
- Power output: 270–280 PS (199–206 kW; 266–276 hp)
- Torque output: 371–400 N⋅m (274–295 lb⋅ft)

Dimensions
- Length: 890 mm (35.04 in)
- Width: 740 mm (29.13 in)
- Height: 725 mm (28.54 in)

Chronology
- Predecessor: Nissan Y engine
- Successor: Nissan VK engine

The VH series consists of 4.1 and 4.5 litres (4,130 and 4,494 cc) engines built from 1989 to 2001 by the Nissan Motor Corporation. The design consists of a 90-degree V8 with an aluminium cylinder block that features a closed upper deck and a deep skirt. The cylinder heads are also aluminium with a DOHC 4 valves design and pentroof combustion chambers. The production blocks and production head castings were used successfully in various forms of racing including the IRL.

== VH45DE ==
The VH45DE is a 4.5 litres (4,494 cc) V8 developed by Nissan for use in the Infiniti Q45 sport luxury sedan (G50 platform) which was released in November 1989. The engine was also used in the Japanese market Nissan President limousine (JG50 platform) which debuted in late 1990. The VH45DE typically generates 280 PS (206 kW; 276 hp) at 6000 rpm and 40.8 kg⋅m (400 N⋅m; 295 lb⋅ft) at 4,000 rpm with a redline of 6900 rpm.

Some of the pertinent features of the VH45DE are forged steel crankshaft, forged steel connecting rods, 6 Bolt main bearing caps with studs, full-length main bearing girdle, lightweight, floating pistons with molybdenum coating, sodium-filled exhaust valves, cross-flow cooling system, hydraulic lash adjusters, single-row silent timing chain, coil-on-plug ignition system, lifter buckets ride directly on cams to reduce friction, redline of 6900 rpm, compression ratio of 10.2:1, bore and stroke of 93 mm × 82.7 mm (3.66 in × 3.26 in), dimensions: 890 mm (35.04 in)(L) x 740 mm (29.13 in)(W) x 725 mm (28.54 in)(H).

The 4.5 L (4,494 cc) VH45DE featured variable valve timing, also known as VTC, from 1990 until 1995. This was during the time that the "Gentleman's Agreement" between Japan's automotive manufacturers was in effect, requiring all cars sold in their home market to (on paper, at least) produce no more than 280 PS. Due to tightening emissions regulations in the US market, the VTC feature was dropped from the 1996 Infiniti Q45. In the following year, the VH45DE was no longer available in any US market vehicles. The engine continued on in the Japanese market until 2002 in the Nissan President limousine; power was somewhat lower in the President to make it quieter and smoother.

VH45DEs made before 1994 used plastic timing chain guides, and over time these have been known to fail. This results in a noisy valve-train and parts of the plastic guides can end up in the sump and oil pickup, resulting in engine damage. Nissan changed to metal backed chain guides from 1994 onwards.

This engine was used in the following vehicle(s):

- 1990-1996 Infiniti Q45, 280 PS (206 kW; 276 hp) at 6,000 rpm, 400 N⋅m (295 lb⋅ft) at 4,000 rpm
- 1990-2002 Nissan President, 270 PS (199 kW; 266 hp) at 5,600 rpm, 394 N⋅m (291 lb⋅ft) at 4,000 rpm

The VH45DE became a relatively popular engine swap for other platforms due to being low cost to source and also able to be adapted to a Nissan manual transmission when using an aftermarket adapter plate. The VH45DE is also used in a variety of motorsports ranging from drifting to drag racing, boat racing, and dirt track sprint cars (Australia and New Zealand).

== VH41DE ==
The VH41DE is a 4.1 litres (4,130 cc) V8 that was based on the VH45DE. The bore of 93 mm (3.66 in) remained but the stroke was shortened to 76 mm (2.99 in). Power output for this smaller engine is 270 PS (199 kW; 266 hp) at 5600 rpm and 37.8 kg⋅m (371 N⋅m; 273 lb⋅ft) at 4000 rpm.

The VH41DE also used a double row timing chain, compared to the VH45DE that used a single row timing chain. Its alternator is also located at the top of the engine which creates an overall narrower engine package which can be handy in engine conversions where it may otherwise foul on the chassis rails.

The 4.1 L (4,130 cc) VH41DE was used in the following vehicles:

- 1997-2001 Infiniti Q45 270 PS (199 kW; 266 hp), 371 N⋅m (273 lb⋅ft)
- 1992-1996 Nissan Leopard, 270 PS (199 kW; 266 hp), 371 N⋅m (273 lb⋅ft)
- 1991-1996 Nissan Cima FY32, 270 PS (199 kW; 266 hp), 371 N⋅m (273 lb⋅ft)
- 1996-2001 Nissan Cima FY33, 270 PS (199 kW; 266 hp), 377 N⋅m (278 lb⋅ft)

== See also ==
- Nissan VRH Racing Engines
- List of Nissan engines
