= Nissan VQ engine =

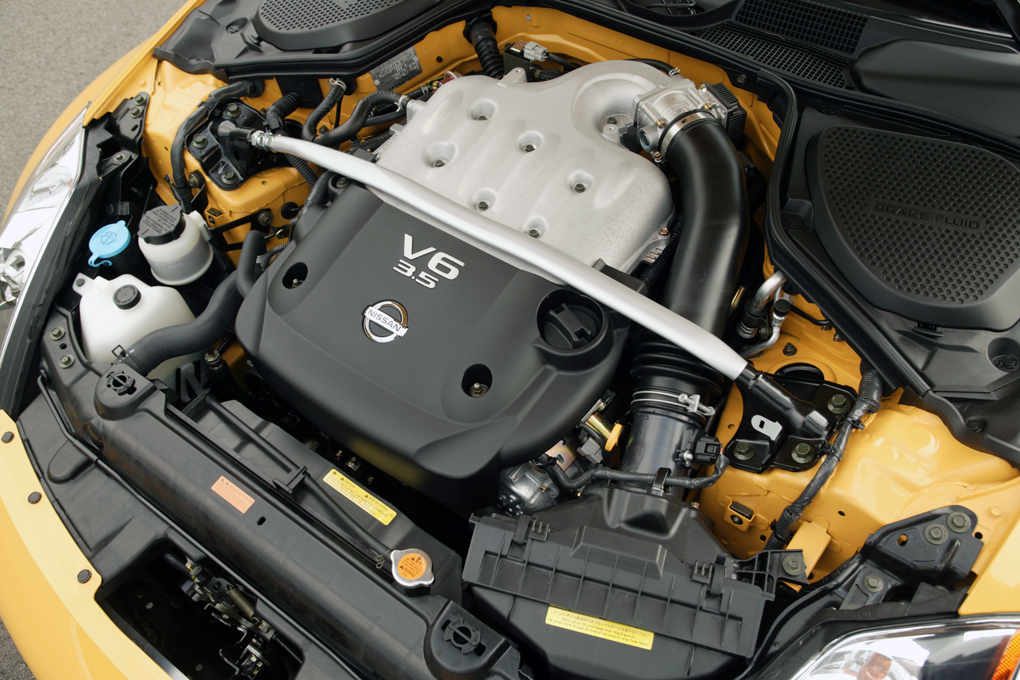
- VQ35DE engine in a Nissan 350Z

Overview
- Manufacturer: Nissan (Nissan Machinery)
- Production: 1994–present

Layout
- Configuration: 60° V6
- Displacement: 2.0L; 2.3L; 2.5L; 3.0L; 3.5L; 3.7L; 3.8L; 4.0L
- Cylinder block material: Aluminium
- Cylinder head material: Aluminium
- Valvetrain: DOHC 4 valves x cyl. with VVT

Chronology
- Predecessor: Nissan VE engine Nissan VG engine V6 ESL engine
- Successor: Nissan VR engine

The VQ is a family of V6 automobile petrol engines developed by Nissan and produced in displacements varying from 2.0 L to 4.0 L. Designed to replace the VG series, the all-aluminium 4-valve per cylinder DOHC design debuted with Nissan's EGI/ECCS sequential multi-point fuel injection (MPFI) system. Changes from the VG engine include switching to a timing chain from a timing belt, and relocating the water pump from the outside of the engine to inside the timing cover where the pump is driven by the timing chain. Later versions featured various improvements, such as variable valve timing, and NEO-Di designated VQ engines replace MPFI with direct fuel injection. Only the VQ25DE and VQ35DE engines are branded as the V4U and V4Y respectively within Renault.

The VQ series engine was honored in a record 14-straight selections by Ward's 10 Best Engines from the list's inception until 2008.

== Versions ==
1st gen (1994-)

- VQ20DE
- VQ25DE 1st

== DE series ==
=== VQ20DE ===
The VQ20DE is an aluminium block, aluminium head, DOHC 24-valve 2.0 L (1,995 cc) V6, with a 76 mm × 73.3 mm (2.99 in × 2.89 in) bore and stroke and compression ratio ranging from 9.5 to 10.0:1. In base form it produces 150 PS (110 kW; 148 hp) to 160 PS (118 kW; 158 hp) at 6400 rpm and 137 to 145 lb⋅ft (186 to 197 N⋅m) at 4400 rpm (lean burn).

It is fitted to the following vehicles:

- 1994–2003 Nissan Cefiro A32 and A33
- 1995–1999 Nissan QX A32
- 1998–2005 Renault Samsung SM5 KPQ/A32

=== VQ23DE ===
Nissan VQ23DE engine in a 2004 Nissan Teana J31

The VQ23DE displaces 2.3 L (2349 cc) and is eqontinuously Variable-valve Timing Control). Bore and stroke are 85 mm × 69 mm (3.35 in × 2.72 in), and compression ratio is 9.8:1. It produces 173 PS (127 kW; 171 hp) at 6000 rpm and 166 lb⋅ft (225 N⋅m) at 4400 rpm.

It is fitted to the following vehicles:

- 2003–2008 Nissan Teana J31
- 2006–2011 Renault Samsung SM7 170 PS (125 kW; 168 hp) (Neo VQ23)
- 2008–2011 Renault Safrane 170 PS (125 kW; 168 hp) (Neo VQ23)

=== VQ25DE (Renault V4U) ===
VQ25DE	
displacement	2,496 cc
bore & stroke	85 mm × 73.3 mm
compression ratio	9.8:1 ~ 10.3:1
produces PS	190 ~ 210 @ 6400rpm
produces torque (kgf⋅m)	24.06 ~ 26.92 @ ????rpm
produces torque (N⋅m)	236 ~ 264 @ ????rpm

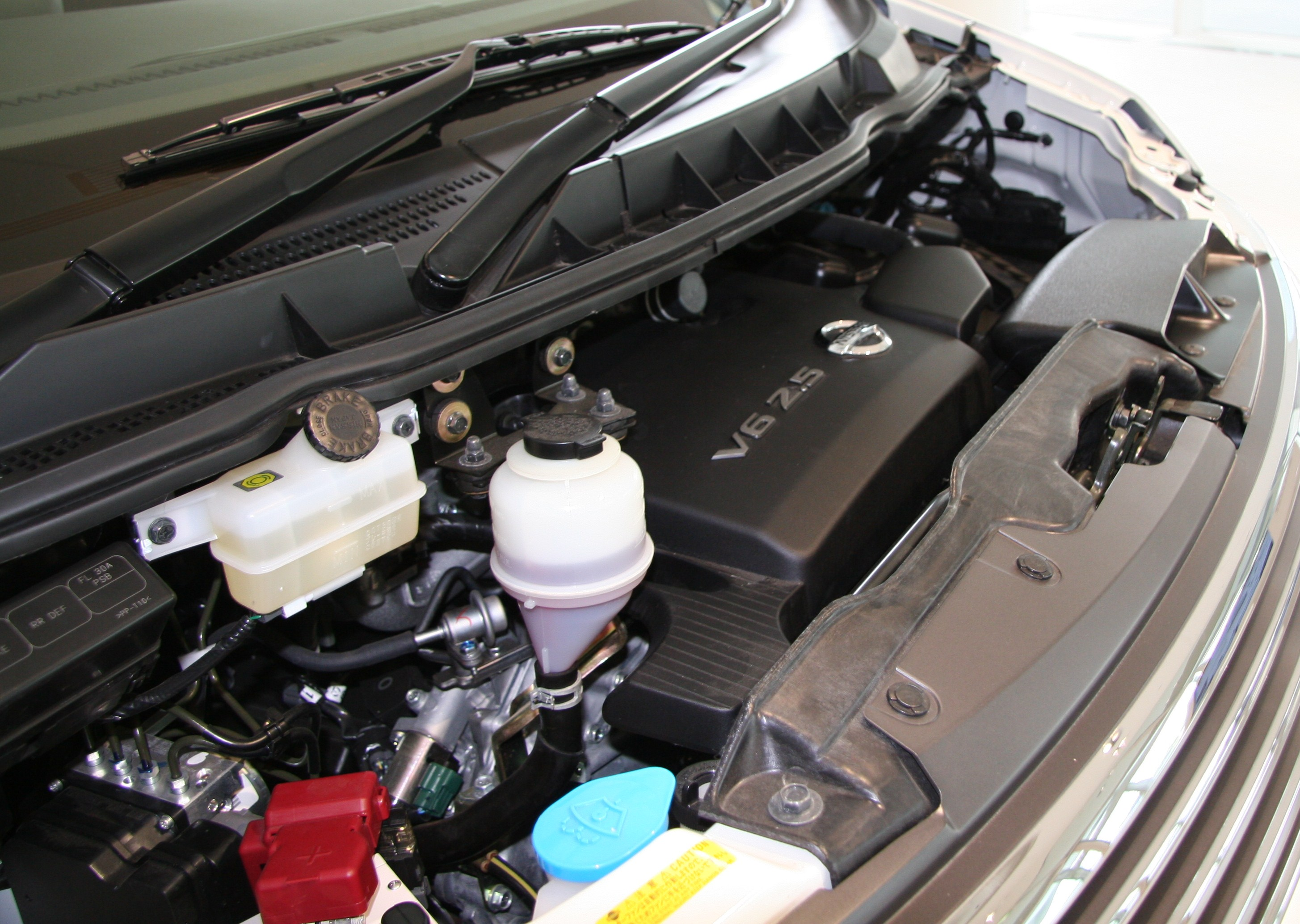
The VQ25DE engine in a 2007 Nissan Elgrand

The VQ25DE is similar to the VQ20DE, but is .5 L larger, at 2.5 L (2,496 cc) displacement. Bore and stroke are 85 mm × 73.3 mm (3.35 in × 2.89 in), with compression ratios ranging from 9.8 to 10.3:1. It produces 190 to 210 PS (140 to 154 kW; 187 to 207 hp) at 6400 rpm and 174 to 195 lb⋅ft (236 to 264 N⋅m) of torque. Later versions produce 186 PS (137 kW; 183 hp) at 6000 rpm and 171 N⋅m (126 lb⋅ft) at 3200 rpm. In some Nissans, this engine was replaced by the QR25DE.

It is fitted to the following vehicles:
- 1994–1998 Nissan Cefiro (A32)
- 2000–2003 Nissan Cefiro (A33)
- 1996–1999 Nissan Leopard (FY33)
- 1997–1999 Nissan Cedric (Y33)
- 2004–2007 Nissan Fuga (Y50)
- 2004–2007 Infiniti M (Y50)
- 2004–2010 Nissan Elgrand (E51)
- 2008–2011 Nissan Teana (J32)
- 1998–2005 Renault Samsung SM5 (KPQ/A32)
- 2010–2019 Renault Samsung SM5 (L43) 178 PS (131 kW; 176 hp)
- 2010–2015 Renault Latitude (L43) 178 PS (131 kW; 176 hp)

=== VQ25DET ===
The VQ25DET is a turbocharged 2.5 L (2,495 cc) engine with CVTC. Its bore and stroke are 85 mm × 73.3 mm (3.35 in × 2.89 in), with a compression ratio of 8.5:1. It produces 280 PS (206 kW; 276 hp) at 6400 rpm and 300 lb⋅ft (407 N⋅m) at 3200 rpm.

It is fitted to the following vehicles:

- 2001–2004 Nissan Stagea 250t RS FOUR V, 250t RX FOUR, AR-X FOUR and Autech AXIS (NM35)

=== VQ30DE ===
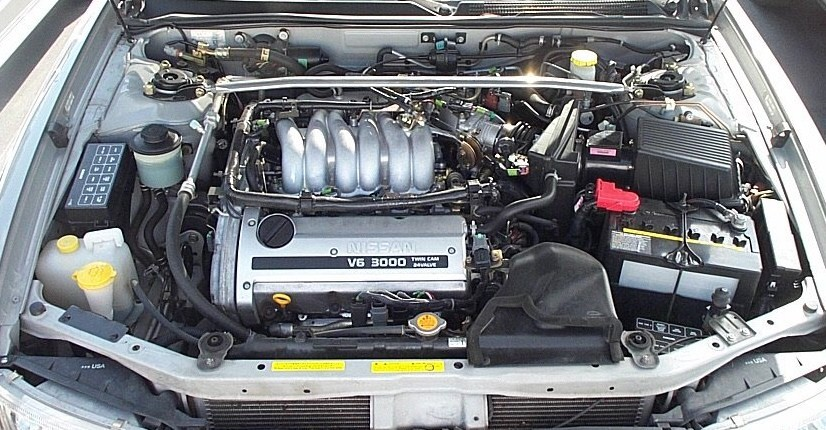
VQ30DE

VQ30DE	
displacement	2,988 cc
bore & stroke	93 mm × 73.3 mm
compression ratio	10.0:1
produces PS	193 ~ 230 at 6400rpm
produces torque (kgf⋅m)	28.35 ~ 29.98 @ 4400rpm
produces torque (N⋅m)	278 ~ 294 at 4400rpm

The 3.0 L (2,988 cc) VQ30DE has a bore and stroke of 93 mm × 73.3 mm (3.66 in × 2.89 in) respectively with a compression ratio of 10.0:1. It produces 192 PS (141 kW; 189 hp) to 230 PS (169 kW; 227 hp) at 6400 rpm and 205 to 217 lb⋅ft (278 to 294 N⋅m) at 4400 rpm. The VQ30DE was on the Ward's 10 Best Engines list from 1995 through 2001. It is an aluminium open deck block design with microfinished internals and a relatively light weight.

An improved version of the VQ30DE is known by the designation VQ30DE-K. The K designation stands for the Japanese word kaizen which translates to "improvement". The engine was used in the 2000–2001 Nissan Maxima and adds a true dual-runner intake manifold for better high-end performance compared to some earlier Japanese and Middle-East market versions of this engine (2000-2001 Infiniti I30 models added an additional fenderwell intake, boosting power to 230 PS (227 hp; 169 kW)). The VQ30DEK produces 227 PS (167 kW; 224 hp). The 1995–1999 US spec VQ30DE was equipped with only a single runner intake manifold.

It is fitted to the following vehicles:
- 1994–1998 Nissan Cefiro (A32), 220 PS (162 kW; 217 hp) and 206 lb⋅ft (279 N⋅m)
- 1995–1999 Nissan QX (A32)
- 1995–1999 Nissan Maxima (A32), 192 PS (141 kW; 189 hp) and 205 lb⋅ft (278 N⋅m)
- 1996–1999 Infiniti I30 (A32), 192 PS (141 kW; 189 hp) and 205 lb⋅ft (278 N⋅m)
- 2000–2001 Nissan Maxima (A33), 225 PS (165 kW; 222 hp) and 217 lb⋅ft (294 N⋅m); 227 PS (167 kW; 224 hp) for Anniversary Edition SE
- 2000–2001 Infiniti I30 (A33), 230 PS (169 kW; 227 hp) and 217 lb⋅ft (294 N⋅m)
- 1999–2003 Nissan Bassara U30, 223 PS (164 kW; 220 hp) and 206 lb⋅ft (279 N⋅m)
- 1998–2003 Nissan Presage U30, 223 PS (164 kW; 220 hp) and 206 lb⋅ft (279 N⋅m)
- 2002–2004 Dallara SN01, World Series by Nissan
- 1995–1999 Nissan Gloria (Y33)

=== VQ30DET ===
The 3.0 L (2,988 cc) VQ30DET is a turbocharged version of the VQ30DE. Bore and stroke remain the same at 93 mm × 73.3 mm (3.66 in × 2.89 in) respectively, and it has a compression ratio of 9.0:1. It produces 270 PS (199 kW; 266 hp) and 271 lb⋅ft (367 N⋅m). From 1998 onwards, it produces 280 PS (206 kW; 276 hp) at 6000 rpm and 285 lb⋅ft (386 N⋅m) at 3600 rpm.

It is fitted to the following vehicles:

- 1995–2004 Nissan Gloria Y33, Y34
- 1995–2004 Nissan Cedric Y33, Y34
- 1996–1999 Nissan Leopard Y33
- 1996–2001 Nissan Cima Y33
- 2001–2007 Nissan Cima F50

=== VQ30DETT ===
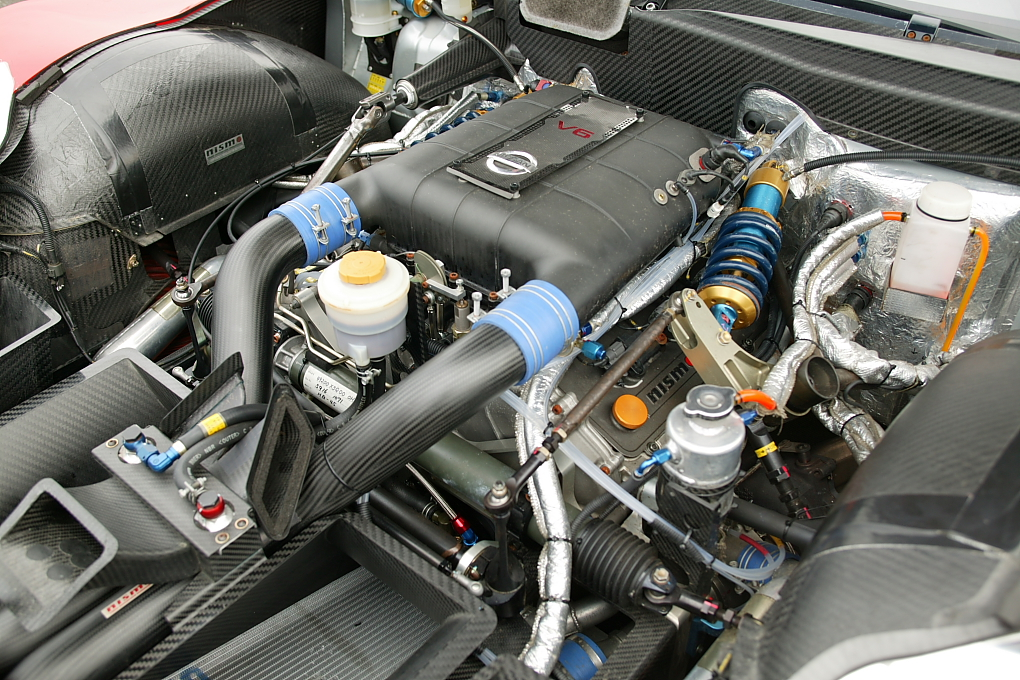
VQ30DETT

The twin-turbo VQ30DETT is an engine used only in Nissan's racing cars, primarily in the Super GT series (formerly the JGTC). First used on the Skyline GT-R JGTC race cars during the 2002 season, this engine subsequently powered the Fairlady Z race cars. Homologation rules allow them to use the VQ30DETT in lieu of the stock VQ35DE. Race output of this engine is estimated at around 480 PS (353 kW; 473 hp).

The VQ30DETT was replaced in 2007 by the VK45DE for use in the Super GT Fairlady Z's and later in the GT-R.

It was utilized in the following vehicles:

- 2002–2003 Skyline GT-R JGTC race cars (Non-Production)
- 2004 Fairlady Z JGTC race cars (Non-Production)
- 2005–2006 Fairlady Z Super GT race cars (Non-Production)

=== VQ35DE (Renault V4Y) ===
VQ35DE	
displacement	3,498 cc
bore & stroke	95.5 mm × 81.4 mm
compression ratio	10.0:1, 10.3:1, or 10.6:1
produces PS	231 ~ 304 @ ????rpm
produces torque (kgf⋅m)	34.05 ~ 37.83 @ ????rpm
produces torque (N⋅m)	334 ~ 371 @ ????rpm

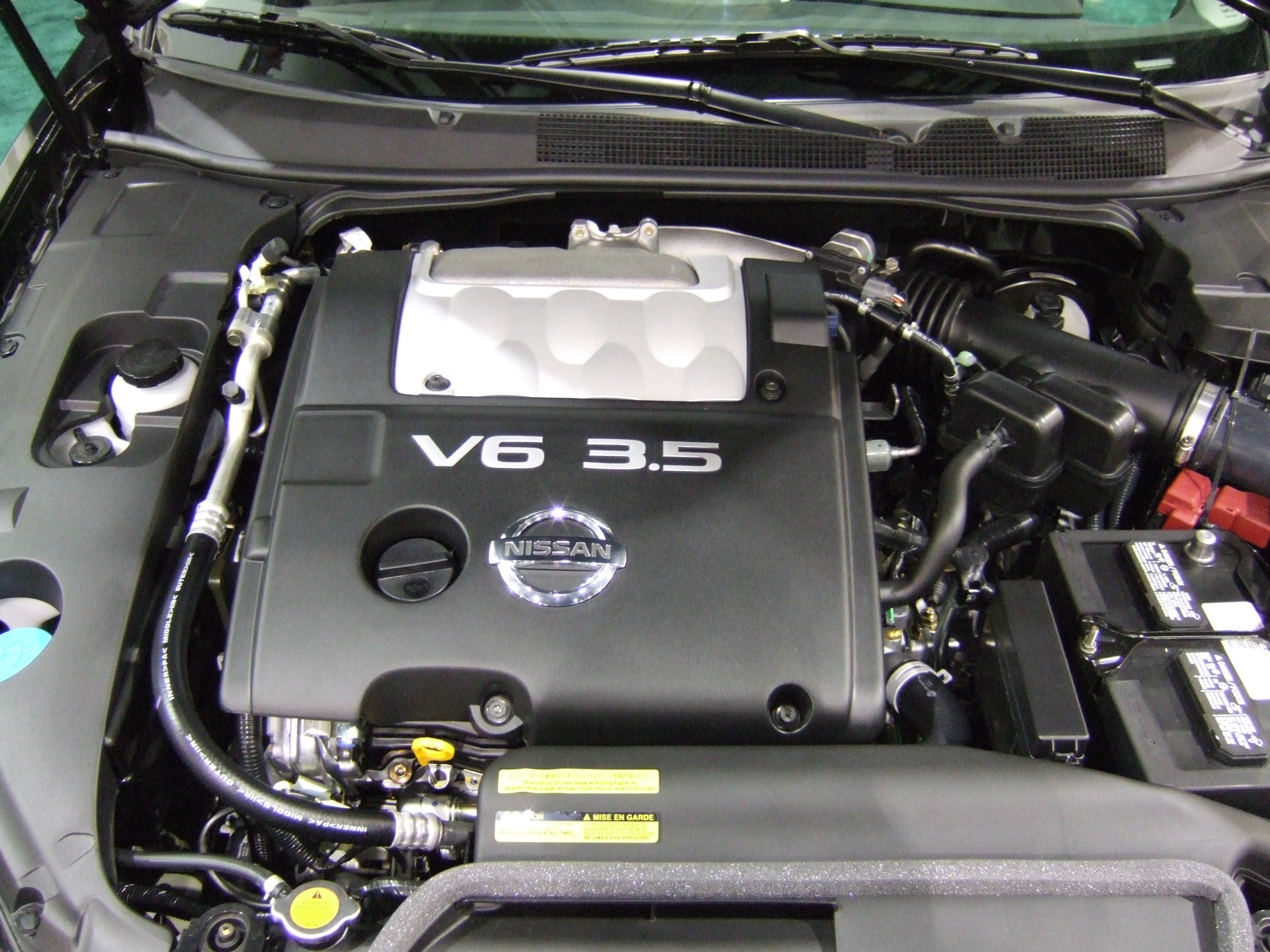
A VQ35DE in a 2007 Nissan Maxima

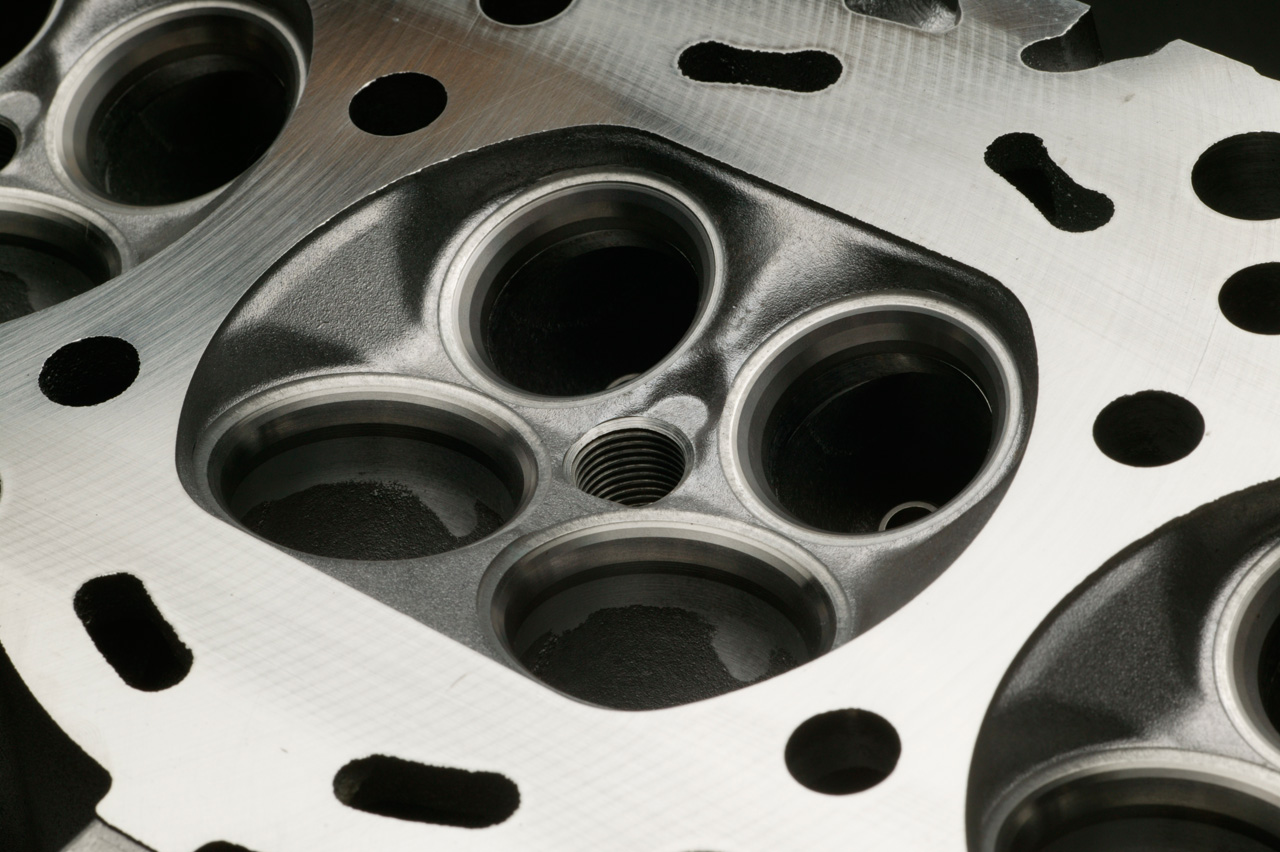
Cylinder head of VQ35DE

The 3.5 L (3,498 cc) VQ35DE is used in many modern Nissan vehicles. Bore and stroke are 95.5 mm × 81.4 mm (3.76 in × 3.20 in). It uses a similar block design to the VQ30DE, but adds variable valve timing (CVTCS) for the intake. It produces from 231 to 304 PS (170 to 224 kW; 228 to 300 hp) of power and 246 to 274 lb⋅ft (334 to 371 N⋅m) of torque depending on the application.

The VQ35DE is built in Iwaki and Decherd, TN. It was on the Ward's 10 Best Engines list from 2002 through to 2007 and again in 2016. It features forged steel connecting rods, a microfinished one-piece forged crankshaft, and Nissan's nylon intake manifold technology. It has low-friction molybdenum-coated pistons and the intake is a high-flow tuned induction system. Since its inception Nissan has improved upon the VQ35DE with changes keeping it an efficient class leading V6 engine. The engine was updated in 2005 as the VQ35DE Rev-Up. It included variable exhaust timing, a higher rev limit, and a revised oil pump, boosting the output to 297 crank horsepower.

A modified version of the VQ35DE, called the S1, is produced by Nismo (Nissan's motorsports and performance division) for the Fairlady Z S-Tune GT. It produces 300 PS (221 kW; 296 hp) at 7,500 rpm, a higher rev-limit than that of the original VQ35DE.

The VQ35DE is fitted to the following vehicles:

North American

Years	Model	Power output
2001–2004	Nissan Pathfinder	240 hp (179 kW; 243 PS)
2013–2016	Nissan Pathfinder	260 to 284 hp (194 to 212 kW; 264 to 288 PS)
2001–2003	Infiniti QX4	240 hp (179 kW; 243 PS)
2001–2004	Infiniti I35	255 hp (190 kW; 259 PS)
2002–2018	Nissan Altima	240 to 270 hp (179 to 201 kW; 243 to 274 PS)
2002–2023	Nissan Maxima	255 to 300 hp (190 to 224 kW; 259 to 304 PS)
2002–2006	Nissan 350Z	287 to 300 hp (214 to 224 kW; 291 to 304 PS)
2002–2007	Infiniti G35 Coupe	280 to 298 hp (209 to 222 kW; 284 to 302 PS)
2002–2006	Infiniti G35 Sedan	260 to 298 hp (194 to 222 kW; 264 to 302 PS)
2002–2008	Infiniti FX35	280 hp (209 kW; 284 PS)
2002–2024	Nissan Murano	240 to 265 hp (179 to 198 kW; 243 to 269 PS)
2003–2016	Nissan Quest	235 to 260 hp (175 to 194 kW; 238 to 264 PS)
2004–2008	Infiniti M35	275 to 280 hp (205 to 209 kW; 279 to 284 PS)
2012–2013	Infiniti JX35	265 hp (198 kW; 269 PS)
2013–2016	Infiniti QX60	265 to 295 hp (198 to 220 kW; 269 to 299 PS)

JDM and other markets

Years	Model	Power output
2000–2026	Nissan Elgrand	240 PS (177 kW; 237 hp)
2001–2007	Nissan Stagea	272 PS (200 kW; 268 hp) and above
2001–2009	Renault Vel Satis	241 PS (177 kW; 238 hp)
2002–2006	Nissan Skyline 350GT Sedan	268 hp (200 kW; 272 PS)
2003–2007	Nissan Skyline 350GT Coupe	280 hp (209 kW; 284 PS)
2003–2018	Nissan Teana/Cefiro (350JM-J31)	231 PS (170 kW; 228 hp)
2003–2009	Nissan Presage	231 hp (172 kW; 234 PS)
2003–2014	Renault Espace	241 PS (177 kW; 238 hp)
2003–2004	Tatuus Formula V6, Formula Renault V6 Eurocup	370 hp (276 kW; 375 PS)
2004–2007	Nissan Fuga 350 GT	300 PS (221 kW; 296 hp)
2005–2006	Nismo Fairlady Z S-Tune GT	300 PS (221 kW; 296 hp) (VQ35DE S1 engine)
2006–2020	Renault Samsung SM7	217 PS (160 kW; 214 hp) (Neo VQ35)
2008–2015	Renault Laguna Coupé	241 PS (177 kW; 238 hp)
2009	Renault Mégane Trophy	331 PS (243 kW; 326 hp)
2010–2015	Renault Latitude	253 PS (186 kW; 250 hp)
2012	Alpine A110-50	400 PS (294 kW; 395 hp)

=== VQ40DE ===
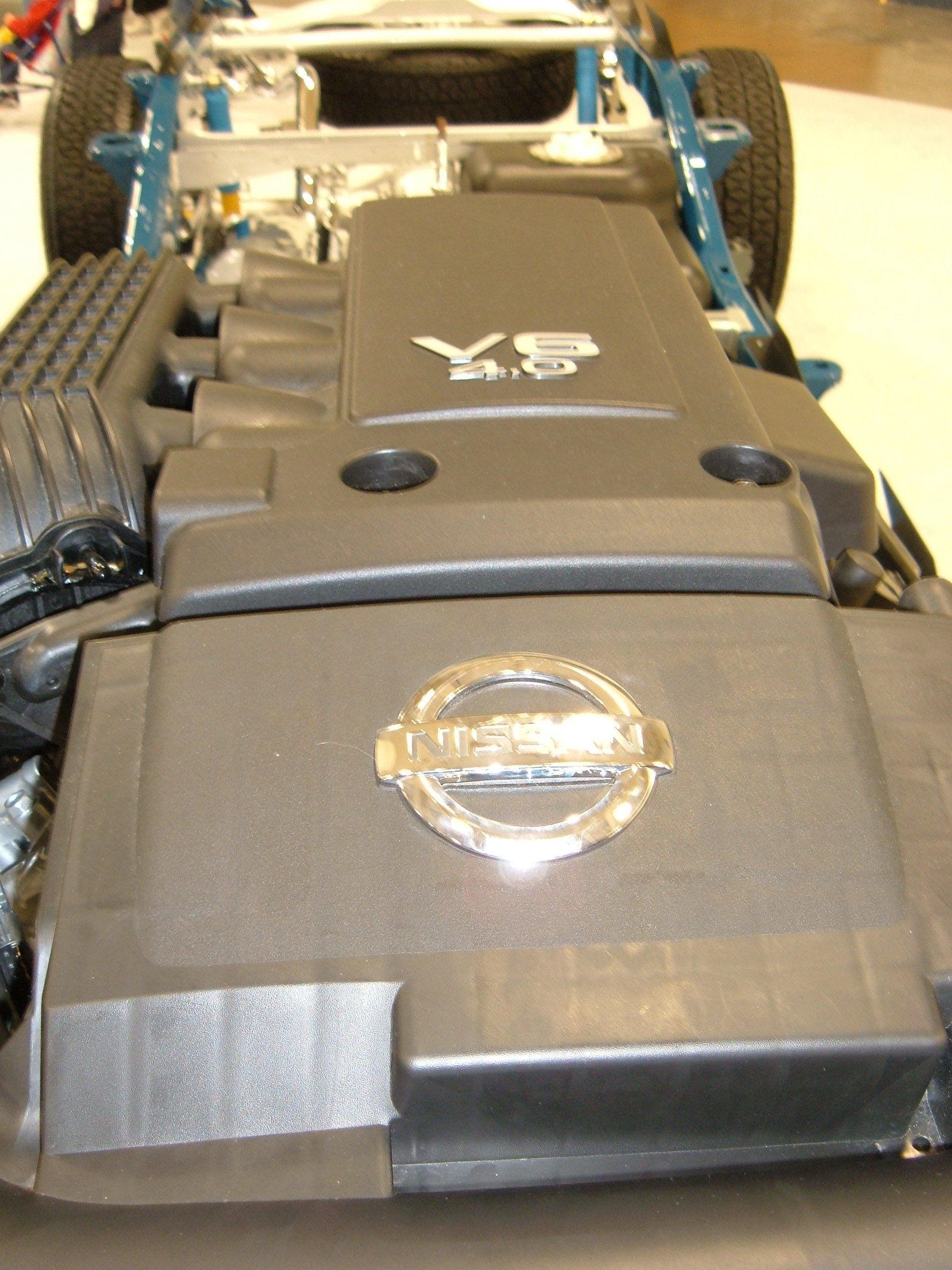
VQ40DE

The VQ40DE is a 4.0 L (3,954 cc) longer stroke variant of the VQ35DE. Bore and stroke are 95.5 mm × 92 mm (3.76 in × 3.62 in). Compression ratio is 9.7:1

Improvements include continuously variable valve timing, variable length/volume intake system, silent timing chain, hollow and lighter camshafts and friction reduction (microfinished surfaces, moly coated pistons). It is port fuel injected with platinum-tipped spark plugs. It produces 261 to 275 hp (195 to 205 kW; 265 to 279 PS) at 5600 rpm and 281 to 288 lb⋅ft (381 to 390 N⋅m) at 4000 rpm.

It is fitted to the following vehicles:

Years	Model	Power output	Torque
2005–2019	Nissan Frontier (D40)	268 hp (200 kW; 272 PS) at 5600 rpm	285 lb⋅ft (386 N⋅m) at 4000 rpm
2005–2015	Nissan Xterra	261 hp (195 kW; 265 PS) at 5600 rpm	281 lb⋅ft (381 N⋅m) at 4000 rpm
2005–2012	Nissan Pathfinder	269 hp (201 kW; 273 PS) at 5600 rpm	290 lb⋅ft (393 N⋅m) at 4000 rpm
2009–2013	Suzuki Equator	276 hp (206 kW; 280 PS) at 5600 rpm	283 lb⋅ft (384 N⋅m) at 4000 rpm
2012–2021	Nissan NV1500	270 hp (201 kW; 274 PS) at 5600 rpm	291 lb⋅ft (395 N⋅m) at 4000 rpm
2012–2021	Nissan NV2500 HD	271 hp (202 kW; 275 PS) at 5600 rpm	282 lb⋅ft (382 N⋅m) at 4000 rpm
2012–2021	Nissan NV Passenger	269 hp (201 kW; 273 PS) at 5600 rpm	294 lb⋅ft (399 N⋅m) at 4000 rpm
2017–2024	Nissan Patrol	275 hp (205 kW; 279 PS) at 5600 rpm	291 lb⋅ft (395 N⋅m) at 4000 rpm

== DD series ==
The DD series is a variant of the DE series engines with direct fuel injection (NEO-Di) and eVTC (electronically controlled continuously variable valve timing).

=== VQ25DD ===
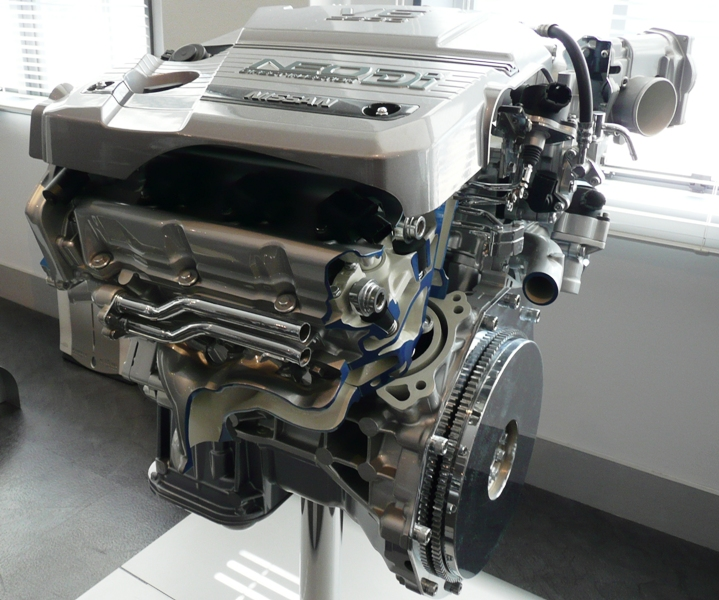
VQ25DD

The 2.5 L (2,495 cc) engine has Bore and stroke of 85 mm and 73.3 mm respectively, with a compression ratio of 11 to 11.3:1. It produces 210 to 215 PS (154 to 158 kW; 207 to 212 hp) at 6400 rpm and 195 to 199 lb⋅ft (264 to 270 N⋅m) at 4400 rpm.

It is fitted to the following vehicles:

- 1999–2002 Nissan Cefiro A33, 210 PS (154 kW; 207 hp) (JDM)
- 1999–2004 Nissan Cedric/Nissan Gloria
- 2001–2006 Nissan Skyline V35 250GT, 215 PS (158 kW; 212 hp)
- 2001–2007 Nissan Stagea M35, 215 PS (158 kW; 212 hp)

=== VQ30DD ===
The 3.0 L (2,988 cc) engine has Bore and stroke of 93 mm and 73.3 mm, with a compression ratio of 11.0:1. It produces 230 PS (169 kW; 227 hp) to 260 PS (191 kW; 256 hp) at 6400 rpm and 217 to 239 lb⋅ft (294 to 324 N⋅m) at 3600 rpm.

It is fitted to the following vehicles:

- 1997–1999 Nissan Leopard Y33 230 PS (169 kW; 227 hp) and 217 lb⋅ft (294 N⋅m)
- 1999–2004 Nissan Cedric Y34
- 1999–2004 Nissan Gloria Y34 240 PS (177 kW; 237 hp) and 228 lb⋅ft (309 N⋅m)
- 2001–2004 Nissan Skyline V35 300GT 260 PS (191 kW; 256 hp) and 239 lb⋅ft (324 N⋅m)
- 2001–2004 Nissan Stagea M35 260 PS (191 kW; 256 hp) and 239 lb⋅ft (324 N⋅m)

=== VQ35DD ===
A larger 3.5L with direct-injection is released for 2017 model year.

It is fitted to the following vehicles:

- 2017–present Nissan Pathfinder 284–295 hp (212–220 kW; 288–299 PS)
- 2017–2024 Infiniti QX60 295 hp (220 kW; 299 PS)

=== VQ38DD ===
A 3.8 L version with direct-injection is released for 2020 model year.

It is fitted to the following vehicles:

- 2020–present Nissan Frontier 310 hp (231 kW; 314 PS)
- 2024–present Nissan Patrol 312 hp (233 kW; 316 PS)

== HR series ==
=== VQ25HR ===
VQ25HR	
displacement	2,496 cc
redline	7,500 rpm
bore & stroke	85 mm × 73.3 mm
compression ratio	10.3:1
produces PS	235 @ 6,800 rpm
produces torque (kgf⋅m)	26.82 @ 4,800 rpm
produces torque (N⋅m)	263 @ 4,800 rpm

The 2.5 L VQ25HR (for "High Revolution" or "High Response") is only offered on longitudinally-mounted engine vehicles which tend to be rear wheel drive or all-wheel drive. Bore and stroke are 85 mm × 73.3 mm (3.35 in × 2.89 in), with a compression ratio of 10.3:1. It produces 221–228 PS (163–168 kW; 218–225 hp) at 6,800 rpm and 194 lb⋅ft (263 N⋅m) at 4,800 rpm. It has dual CVTC for both intake and exhaust, microfinished camshafts and a redline of 7,500 rpm.

It is fitted to the following vehicles:

Years	Model	Power output
2006–2012	Nissan Skyline V36 250GT Sedan	229 PS (168 kW; 226 hp)
2006–2012	Nissan Fuga 250GT	223 PS (164 kW; 220 hp)
2006–2012	Infiniti M25 V6 Sedan	218 hp (163 kW; 221 PS)
2010–2012	Infiniti EX25 (J50) Crossover SUV	222 PS (163 kW; 219 hp)
2011–2012	Infiniti G25 Sedan	218 hp (163 kW; 221 PS)
2012	Mitsubishi Proudia 250 VIP	223 PS (164 kW; 220 hp)

=== VQ35HR ===
VQ35HR	
displacement	3,498 cc
redline	7,500 rpm
bore & stroke	95.5 mm × 81.4 mm
compression ratio	10.6:1
HP	302 ~ 311 @ 6,800 rpm
torque (Nm)	342~358 @ 4,800 rpm
torque (ft-lb)	252.43 ~ 264.01 @ 4,800 rpm
torque (kgf⋅m)	34.9 ~ 36.5 @ 4,800 rpm

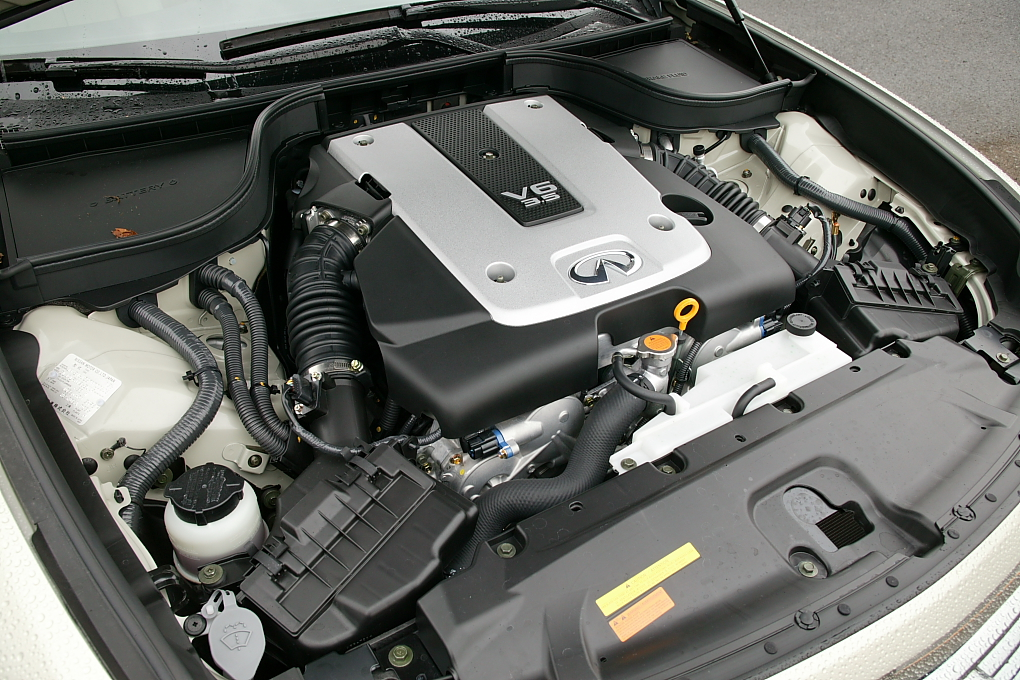
VQ35HR

The VQ35HR engine was first seen in the US with the introduction of the updated 2007 G35 Sedan model, which debuted in August 2006. Nissan updated the VQ line with the addition of the 3.5 L VQ35HR (for "High Revolution"). It produces 315 hp (235 kW; 319 PS) (US market: 306 hp (228 kW; 310 PS) using the revised SAE certified power benchmark) at 6,800 rpm and 37 kg⋅m (363 N⋅m; 268 lb⋅ft) at 4,800 rpm, using a compression ratio of 10.6:1. As of 2009, the Infiniti EX35 produces 297 hp (221 kW; 301 PS) and the same torque presumably due to tighter regulations.

It has NDIS (Nissan Direct Ignition System) and CVTC with hydraulic actuation on the intake cam and electromagnetic on the exhaust cam. Reportedly over 80% of the internal components were redesigned or strengthened to handle an increased RPM range sporting a lofty 7,600 rpm redline. A new dual-path intake (two air cleaners, throttle bodies, etc.) lowers intake tract restriction by 18 percent and new equal-length exhaust manifolds lead into mufflers that are 25 percent more free-flowing for all around better airflow. The electrically actuated variable valve timing on the exhaust cams to broaden the torque curve is new over the "DE" engine. The new engine block retained the same bore and stroke, but the connecting rods were lengthened and the block deck was raised by 8.4 mm to reduce piston side-loads. This modification, along with the use of larger crank bearings with main bearing caps reinforced by a rigid ladder-type main cap girdle to allow the engine reliably rev to 7600 rpm. With an increase in compression ratio from 10.3:1 to 10.6:1, these changes add 6 more horsepower (306 hp (228 kW) total + 3 hp ram air effect not measured by SAE testing = 309 hp (230 kW)). Peak torque is up 8 pound-feet (11 N⋅m) from the older "DE" engine at 268 lb⋅ft (363 N⋅m) and the torque curve is higher and flatter across most of the rpm range, and especially in the lower rpm range.

The VQ35HR was utilized in rear-wheel-drive platforms while the VQ35DE continued to power Nissan's front-wheel-drive vehicles. In 2010, Nissan introduced a hybrid version of the VQ35HR, pairing the engine to a lithium-ion battery pack.

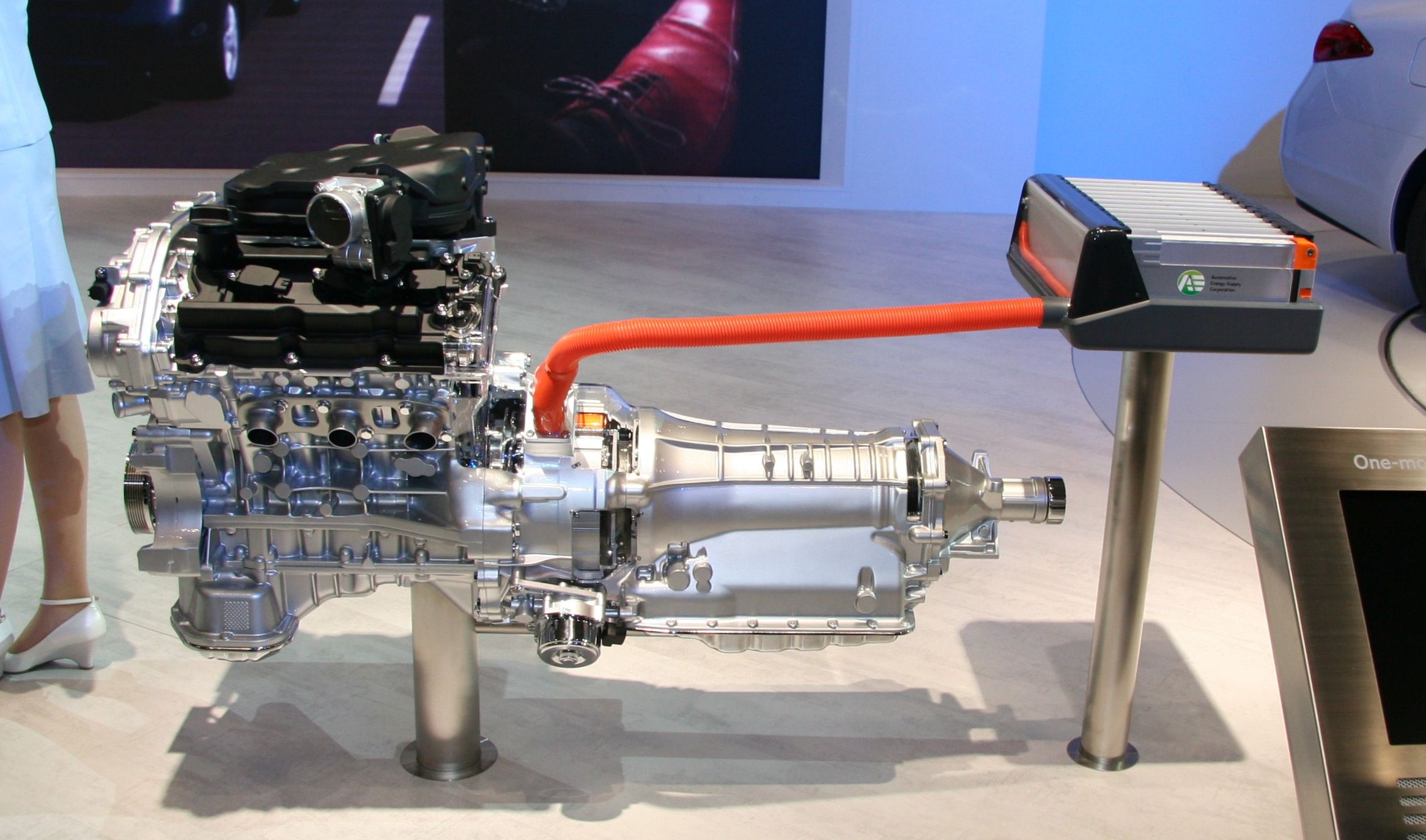
Hybrid VQ35HR

The VQ35HR fitted to the following vehicles:

Years	Model	Power output
2007–2008	Infiniti G35	306 hp (228 kW; 310 PS)
2006–2008	Nissan Skyline V36 350GT Sedan	308 hp (230 kW; 312 PS)
2007–2008	Nissan 350Z	313 hp (233 kW; 317 PS); US Market using revised SAE certified power benchmark - 306 hp (228 kW; 310 PS)
2006–2008	Nissan Fuga 350 GT	308 hp (230 kW; 312 PS)
2008–2012	Infiniti EX35 Crossover SUV	297 hp (221 kW; 301 PS)
2009–2012	Infiniti FX35 Crossover SUV	303 hp (226 kW; 307 PS)
2009–2010	Infiniti M35	303 hp (226 kW; 307 PS)
2011–2013	Infiniti M35h	Engine: 302 hp (225 kW; 306 PS), Combined: 360 hp (268 kW; 365 PS)
2010–2022	Nissan Fuga Hybrid	Combined: 360 hp (268 kW; 365 PS)
2012–2022	Nissan Cima	Combined: 360 hp (268 kW; 365 PS)
2012–2016	Mitsubishi Dignity	Combined: 360 hp (268 kW; 365 PS)
2014–2018	Infiniti Q50 Hybrid	Combined: 360 hp (268 kW; 365 PS)
2014–2025	Nissan Skyline V37 350GT Hybrid	Combined: 360 hp (268 kW; 365 PS)
2014–2019	Infiniti Q70 Hybrid	Combined: 360 hp (268 kW; 365 PS)

=== VQ38HR ===
By 2007, Nissan's ambition to increase the competitiveness of the Z33 chassis in Super Taikyu racing resulted in the development of a larger displacement engine based on the original VQ35HR Block. It featured the same bore but longer-throw crankshaft (bore × stroke: 95.5 mm × 88.4 mm). The end result was the VQ38HR powered Nismo Type 380RS-C which went on to dominate ST class 1 racing. The 3.8-liter racing engine in the 380RS-C develops maximum power of more than 294 kW (394 hp; 400 PS), and maximum torque of 421 N⋅m (311 lb⋅ft). In order to use this new engine in Super GT GT500, limited numbers of the engine were reproduced in the street-legal Fairlady Z Nismo Type 380RS. The VQ38HR engine mounted in the 380RS is a detuned, street version of the racing engine used in the 380RS-C. The engine displacement remains the same, while the intake manifold and exhaust, air-fuel ratio, ignition timing, VTC and other specs have been optimized for street use. The engine produces maximum power of 257 kW (345 hp; 349 PS) at 7200 rpm, and maximum torque of 397 N⋅m (293 lb⋅ft) at 4800 rpm.

The VQ38HR fitted to the following vehicles:

- 2007–2008 Nissan Fairlady Z Version Nismo Type 380RS-C
- 2007–2008 Nissan Fairlady Z Version Nismo Type 380RS

=== Production ===
The VQ35HR and VQ25HR engines were built at Nissan's Iwaki Plant in Fukushima Prefecture.

== VHR series ==
The VHR series is a variation of the VQ-HR engine series with Nissan's VVEL (Variable Valve Event and Lift).

=== VQ37VHR ===
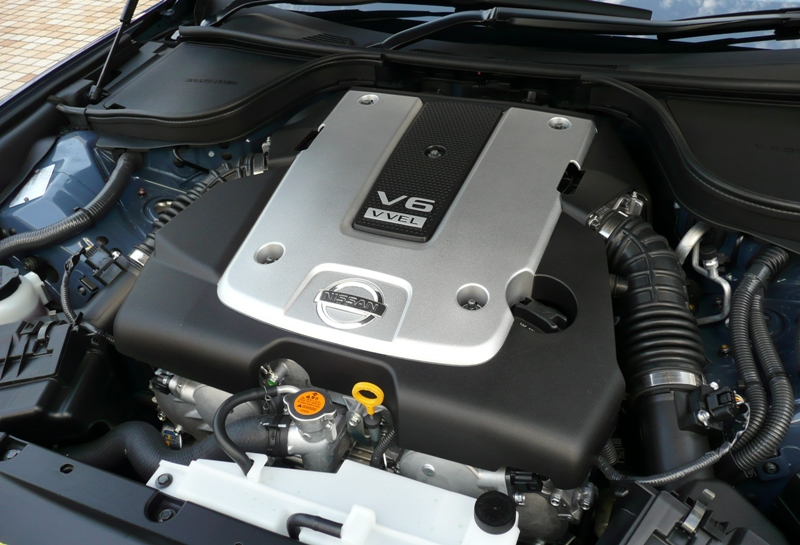
VQ37VHR

VQ37VHR	
displacement	3,696 cc
redline	7,500 rpm
bore & stroke	95.5 mm × 86 mm
compression ratio	11.0:1
produces PS	337 @ 7,000 rpm
produces torque (kgf⋅m)	37.32 @ 5,200 rpm
produces torque (N⋅m)	366 @ 5,200 rpm
produces torque (lb-ft)	269.94 @ 5,200 rpm

It was the first production engine from Nissan using VVEL.
It has a compression ratio of 11.0:1, with a displacement of 3.7 L; 225.5 cu in (3,696 cc), thanks to a bore x stroke of 95.5 mm × 86 mm (3.76 in × 3.39 in) and a redline of 7,500 rpm.
It is rated at 332 bhp (337 PS; 248 kW) at 7,000 rpm and 270 lb⋅ft (366 N⋅m) of torque at 5,200 rpm, and up to 350 bhp (355 PS; 261 kW) at 7,400 rpm and 276 lb⋅ft (374 N⋅m) of torque at 5,200 rpm.

Although the engine VQ37VHR gains only 2 lb⋅ft (3 N⋅m) and 8 lb⋅ft (11 N⋅m) in the Nissan 370Z Nismo, torque over the VQ35HR and this higher torque arrives at 5,200 rpm vs 4,800 rpm in the VQ35HR, the torque curve itself is improved and flattened via VVEL variable valve timing for better throttle response and low rpm torque.

It is fitted into the following vehicles:

Years	Model	Power output
2008–2013	Infiniti G37 Coupe	330 hp (246 kW; 335 PS)
2008–2014	Nissan Skyline V36 370 GT Coupe	330 hp (246 kW; 335 PS)
2009–2014	Infiniti G37 Sedan	328 hp (245 kW; 333 PS)
2009–2014	Nissan Skyline V36 370 GT Sedan	328 hp (245 kW; 333 PS)
2009–2013	Infiniti G37 Convertible	325 hp (242 kW; 330 PS)
2009–2022	Nissan Fuga 370GT	328 hp (245 kW; 333 PS)
2009–2013	Infiniti FX37	325 hp (242 kW; 330 PS)
2009–2013	Infiniti EX37	325 hp (242 kW; 330 PS)
2009–2020	Nissan 370Z/Fairlady Z	332 hp (248 kW; 337 PS)
2009–2020	Nismo 370Z NISMO	350 hp (261 kW; 355 PS)
2011–2013	Infiniti M37	330 hp (246 kW; 335 PS)
2011–2016	Infiniti IPL G37 Coupe	348 hp (260 kW; 353 PS)
2012–2016	Mitsubishi Proudia 370GT	328 hp (245 kW; 333 PS)
2013	Infiniti IPL G37 Convertible	343 hp (256 kW; 348 PS)
2015	Infiniti Q40 Sedan	328 hp (245 kW; 333 PS)
2014–2015	Infiniti Q50 Sedan	328 hp (245 kW; 333 PS)
2014–2016	Infiniti Q60 Coupé	330 to 348 hp (246 to 260 kW; 335 to 353 PS)
2014–2015	Infiniti Q60 Convertible	325 to 343 hp (242 to 256 kW; 330 to 348 PS)
2014–2019	Infiniti Q70	330 hp (246 kW; 335 PS)
2014–2017	Infiniti QX50	325 hp (242 kW; 330 PS)
2014–2017	Infiniti QX70	325 hp (242 kW; 330 PS)

== See also ==
- List of Nissan engines
- World series by Nissan
