= Nissan Stagea =

Japanese Station Wagon made by Nissan

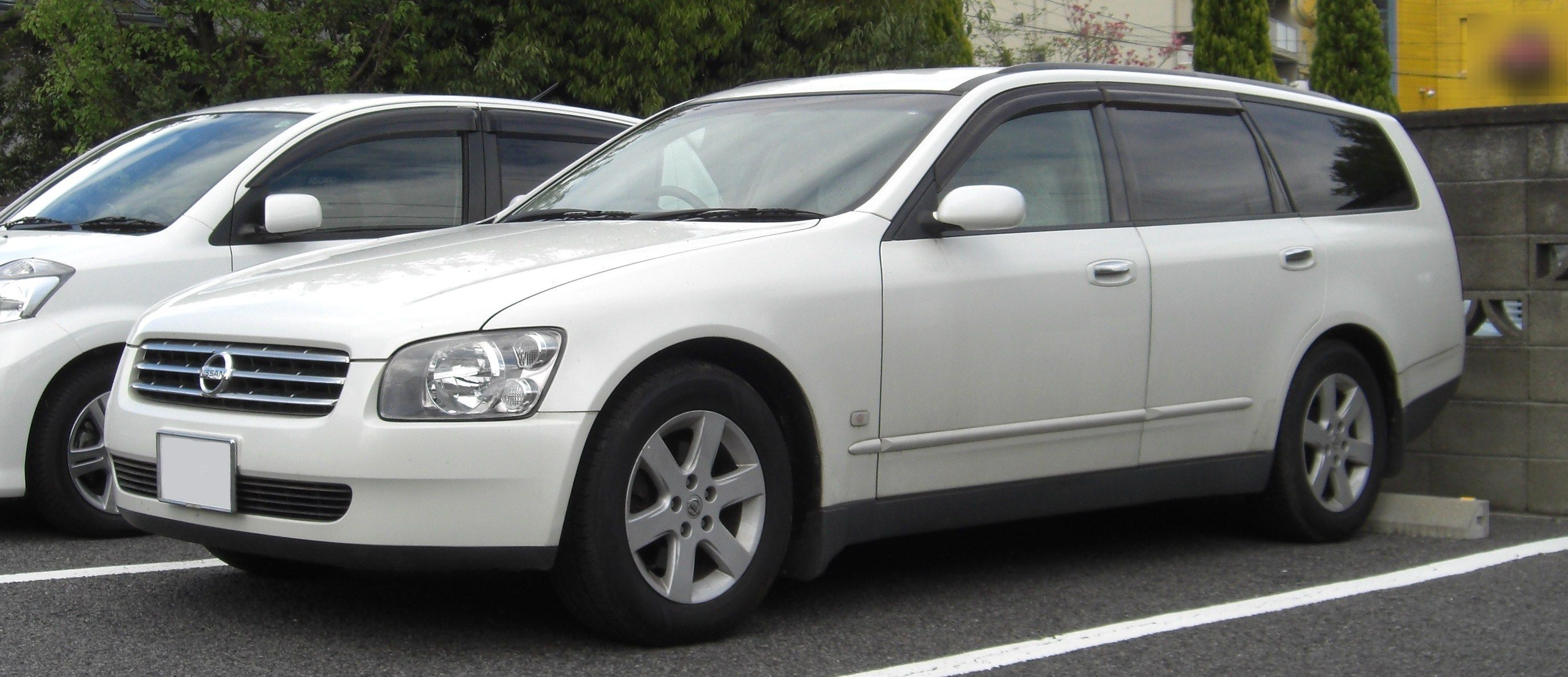
- M35 Nissan Stagea

Overview
- Manufacturer: Nissan
- Production: 1996–2007

Body and chassis
- Class: Mid-size car
- Body style: 5-door station wagon
- Layout: Front-engine, rear-wheel-drive / all-wheel-drive (1996–2001); Front mid-engine, rear-wheel-drive / all-wheel-drive (2001–2007)

Chronology
- Predecessor: Nissan Skyline wagon (R31)
- Successor: Nissan Skyline Crossover

The Nissan Stagea is a station wagon produced by Nissan from 1996 to 2007. It was originally produced by Nissan in 1996 as direct competition for the Subaru Legacy Touring wagon in Japan, and was exclusive to Nissan Prince Store Japanese dealerships. All sub-models of WC34 Stagea share the same floor-pan and mechanical components as the Nissan Laurel (C34), with some of the rear suspension components being the same as those found on the R32, R33, and R34 generations of Nissan Skyline.

There are 4 different versions of the Stagea: the WC34 Series 1 (September 1996 to July 1997), the WC34 Series 1.5 (August 1997 to July 1998), the WC34 Series 2 (August 1998 to March 2001), and the M35 Series (2001 to 2007).

The name is a portmanteau of "STAGE," which means "stage" in English, and the "A" from "Advance".

== First generation (WC34; 1996) ==
First generation (WC34)
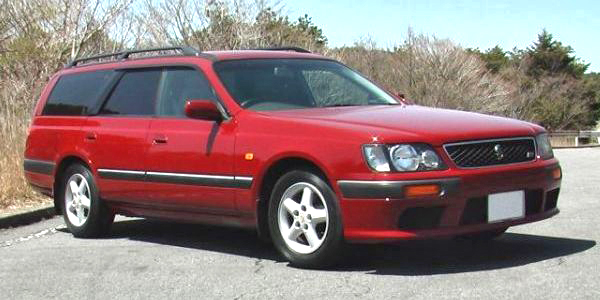
- 1996 Nissan Stagea RS Four

Overview
- Production: October 1996–2001
- Assembly: Japan: Musashimurayama
- Designer: Masato Inoue

Body and chassis
- Related: Nissan Laurel (C34); Nissan Skyline (R33)

Powertrain
- Engine: 2.0 L RB20E I6; 2.0 L RB20DE NEO I6; 2.5 L RB25DE I6; 2.5 L RB25DE NEO I6; 2.5 L RB25DET turbo I6; 2.5 L RB25DET NEO turbo I6; 2.6 L RB26DETT twin-turbo I6 (260RS)
- Transmission: 4-speed automatic (E-AT); 4-speed tiptronic automatic (M-AT); 5-speed manual (5MT)

Dimensions
- Wheelbase: 2,720 mm (107.1 in)
- Length: 4,800 mm (189.0 in)
- Width: 1,755 mm (69.1 in)
- Height: 1,495 mm (58.9 in)
- Curb weight: 1,620 kg (3,571.5 lb)

=== Series 1 ===
The WC34 Series 1 was produced from 3 October 1996 to July 1997. This model bears many visual similarities to the R34 Nissan Skyline, giving the impression of lineage to the R34 Nissan Skyline, though mechanically it is identical to the Nissan Laurel (C34).

It was offered in 3 grades: G, X, and RS. The sporty "RS" features a mesh-type grille and front spoiler. Furthermore, the top-of-the-line RS FOUR V was equipped with forged 16-inch aluminium wheels.

The WC34 Stagea was available with a 2.0L single-cam inline-six engine, a 2.5L twin-cam naturally-aspirated inline-six, and a 2.5L twin-cam turbocharged inline-six. All engines were from the Nissan RB engine family. Engine power ranged from 130 PS (128 hp) in the 2.0L to 190 PS (187 hp) in the 2.5L turbo and 235 PS (232 hp) in the 2.5L turbo.

The Stagea was available in rear wheel drive (RWD) and all-wheel drive (AWD) variants, with the RWD variants using RWD Laurel front suspension of the strut type and AWD versions using RWD R34 Skyline front suspension of the multi-link type. Both RWD and AWD shared its chassis platform with the C35 Laurel, which had the same wheelbase of 2720mm, and was also available in RWD and AWD.

There were some differences in the chassis between 2WD and AWD model Stageas. The main difference being that the driver's side chassis rail on the AWD version was positioned closer to the lower sill. This was done to make room for the transfer case located on the end of the AWD transmission.

The AWD system, ATTESA E-TS, is identical in operation to the Nissan Skyline GTS-FOUR and GT-R AWD system. The AWD Stageas fitted with an automatic transmission also featured a transfer case lock; this locked the transfer case in full 4WD and bypassed the ABS, g-force sensor inputs and ATTESA E-TS engine control unit which were all normally required for the AWD system to work.

Unlike the Skyline and Laurel which had 5 speed automatic transmissions on some automatic 2.5L non turbo versions, all automatic Stageas were 4 speed. All manual models were 5 speed although only 2 models were available manual, the Series 2 turbo RS4S and the Series 1.5 & Series 2 Autech Version 260RS, which were exclusively manual.

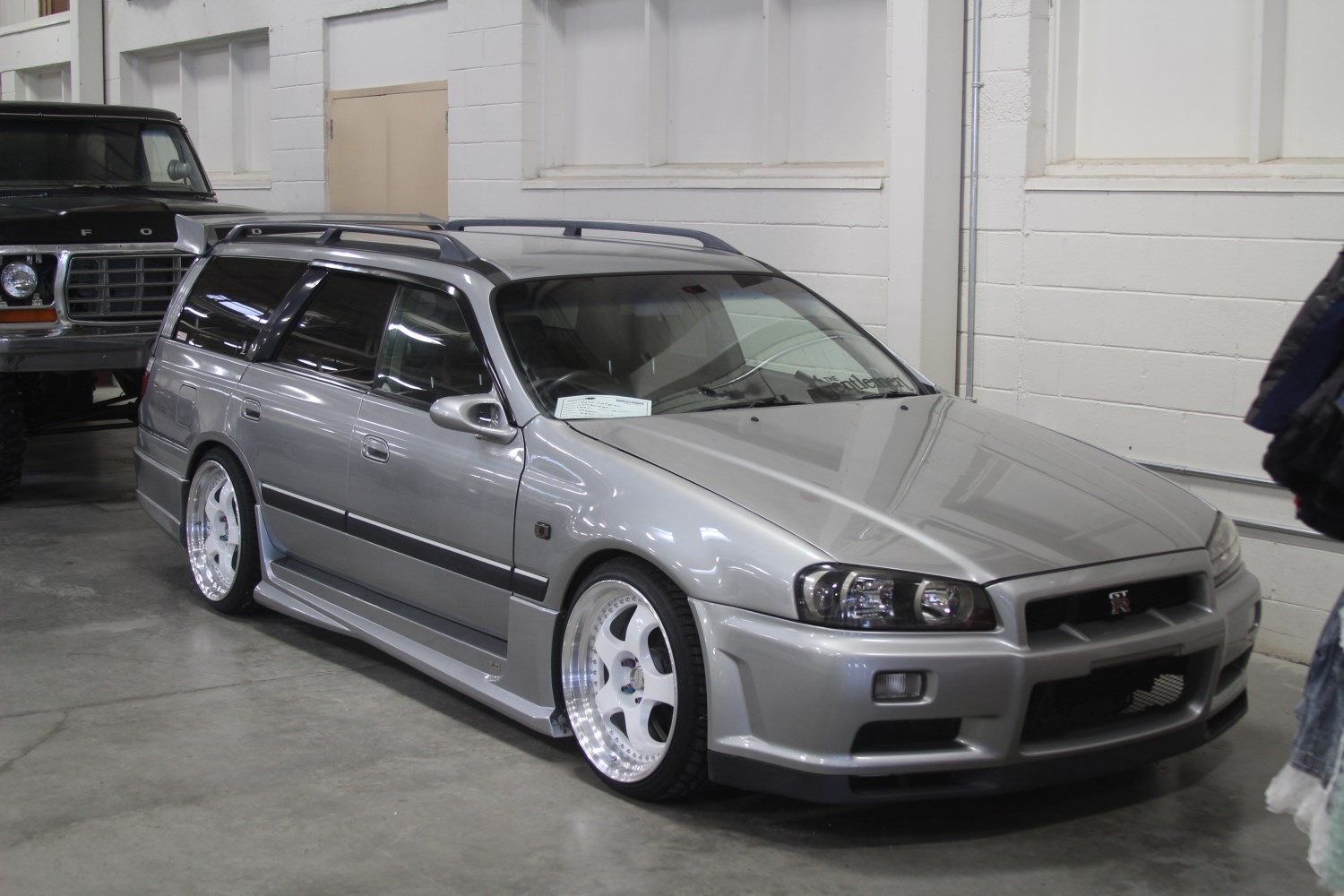
Example of a modified Nissan Stagea with a 1999-2002 R34 Skyline GT-R front end swap

Stageas have achieved some popularity as tuner cars, with some examples featuring higher-powered engines swapped in, such as the 260RS. There are also many examples of owners swapping out the front end with a BNR34 Skyline GT-R front end.

=== Series 1.5 ===
In August 1997, the Stagea received minor changes to the model lineup, lasting until July 1998. The main reason for the change was the replacement of the RB25DE and RB20E engines (found in X and G models) with the updated RB25DE NEO and RB20DE NEO engines. Series 1.5 also added several new model configurations to the lineup:

- 25t X Four - X/G trim interior with RB25DET engine
- 25RS - RS trim interior with RB25DE NEO engine and RWD configuration
- Aero Limited - Factory installed Dayz aero bumper, side skirts, rear skirt, and wing. This option was only available in AR1, KR4 and WK1 paint codes.
- Autech Version 260RS - was added in October 1997 (see below)

In November 1997, two more models were added to the series 1.5 lineup:

- 20X - X/G trim interior with RB20DE NEO engine
- 25RS Four - RS trim interior with RB25DE NEO engine and 4WD configuration

==== 260RS Autech version ====
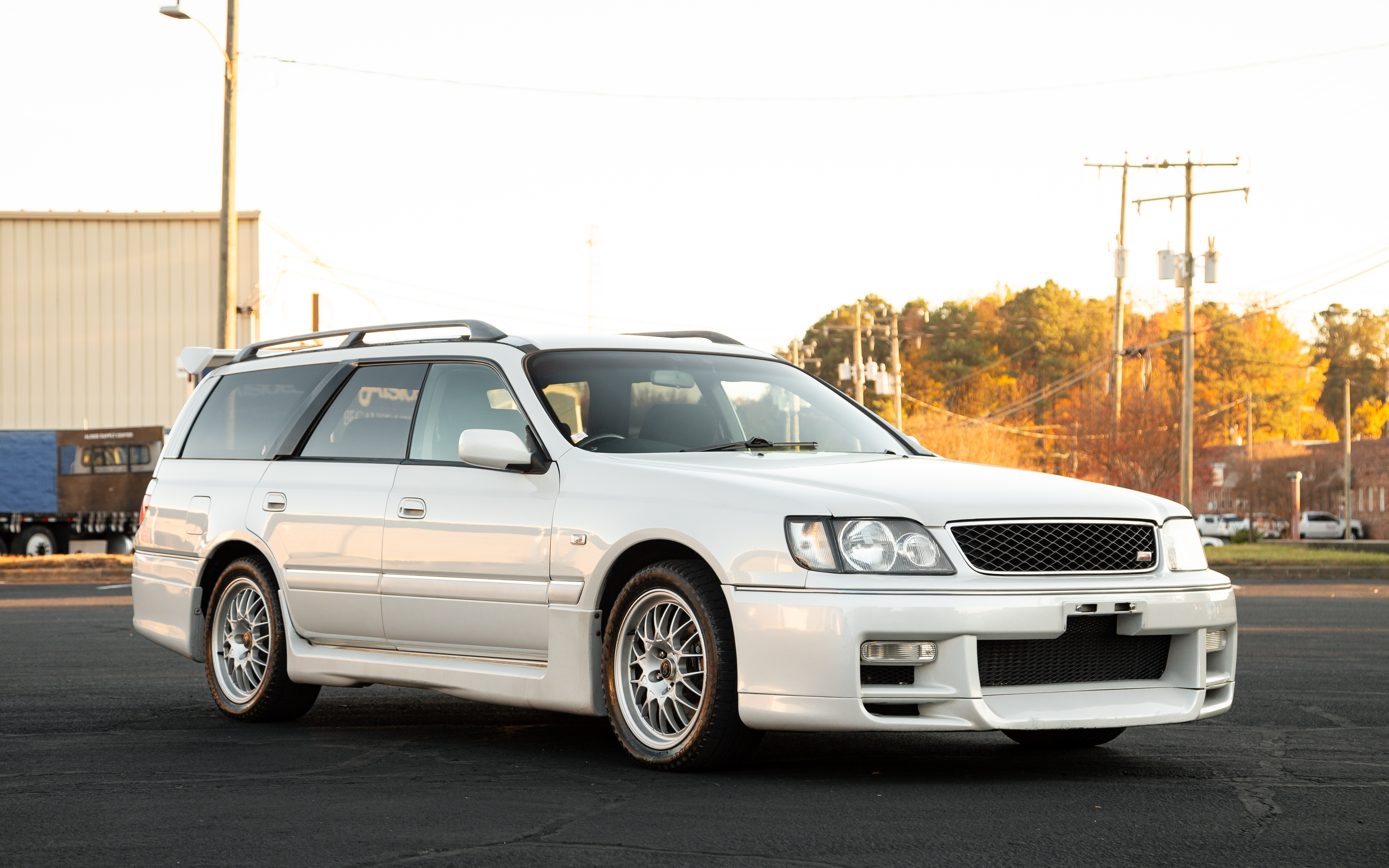

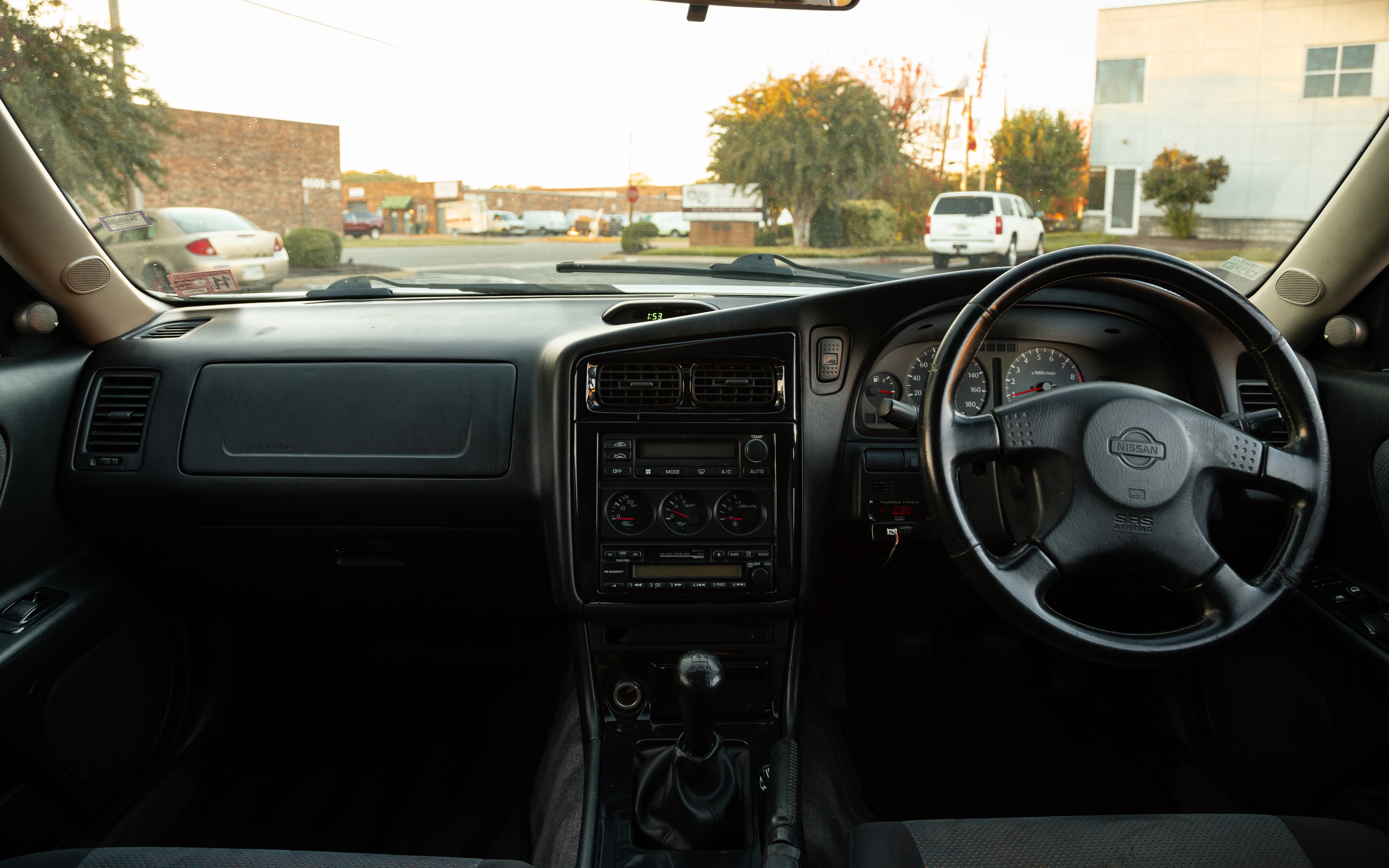
1998 Nissan Stagea 260RS Autech

The Autech 260RS was launched in October 1997. The Stagea 260RS Autech Version, or just 260RS, is a tuned version of the Stagea made by Japanese tuning company Autech. The 260RS uses the 2.6L RB26DETT producing 206 kW (276 hp), coupled to a 5-speed manual transmission and features ATTESA E-TS all-wheel drive from the R33 GTR and a limited-slip rear differential. Other modifications include Brembo brakes, 17" BBS forged alloy wheels, body strengthening, an undercarriage protector, upgraded suspension, a front strut brace, a special rear stabilizer, Autech badging and an Autech bodykit that includes unique sideskirts, front bumper and tailgate spoiler. Interior modifications include an R33 GT-R steering wheel, GT-R style gauges, a leather shift knob and parking brake handle and special seat trim. Like other Japanese sports cars of the time, the 260RS officially produced 280 PS (206 kW; 276 hp) but most sources believe the actual horsepower to be higher. 1,734 260RS (series 1.5 and series 2) models were produced from November 1997 to March 2001.

=== Series 2 ===
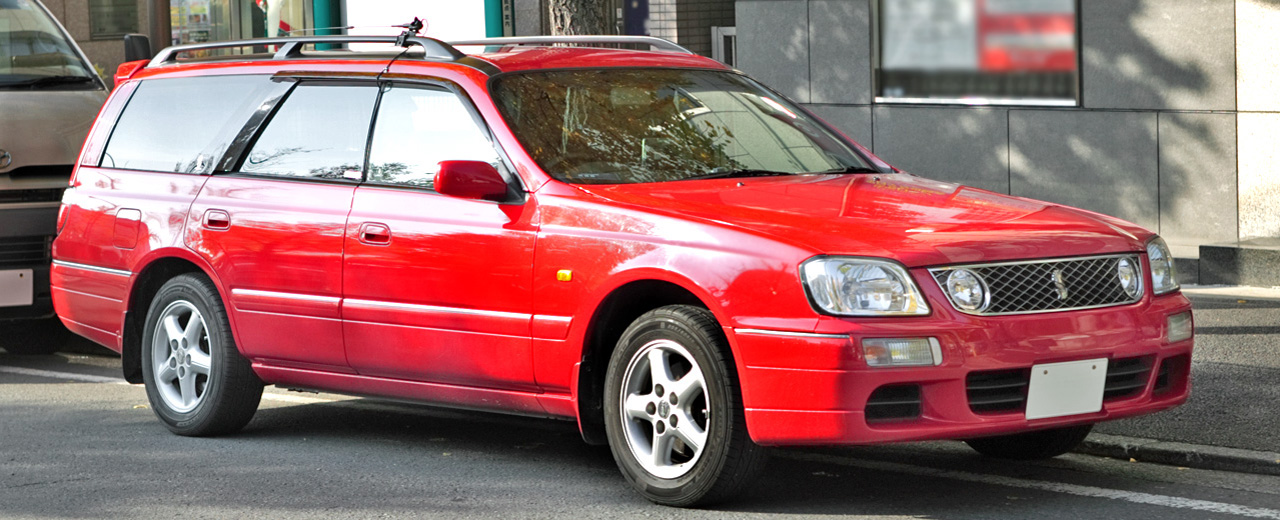

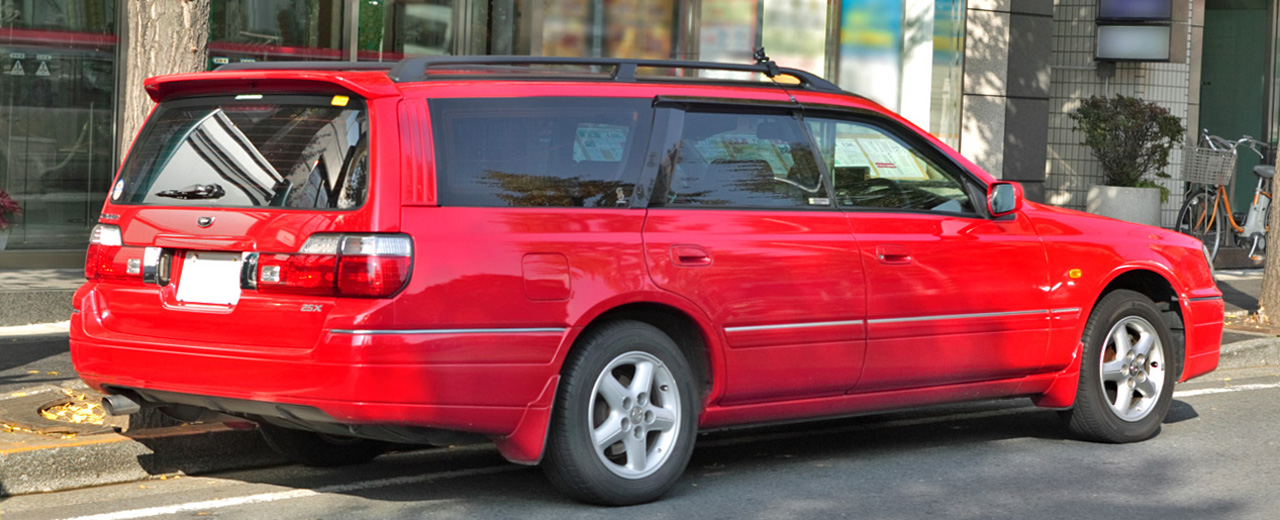
WC34 Nissan Stagea (Series 2)

The WC34 series 2 (August 1998 to March 2001) was a minor revision of the WC34 Series 1. The headlights were changed in shape and made from high impact plastic (previous model had glass headlights) and the high beam lights moved into the grille. The indicators were changed to a clear unit, and changed shape slightly. Front aero was slightly revised and body mouldings colour matched. Interior trim choices were also changed. It has the same engine choices, but they are the updated NEO version of the RB series and higher spec models included a tiptronic auto transmission. The power ranges from 114 kW (153 hp) in the updated NEO 2L to 206 kW (276 hp) for the 2.5L turbo and 2.6L twin turbo. 2WD and 4WD versions available. A choice of transmissions is also available: 4-speed auto (E-AT) for X and G series models, 4-speed tiptronic auto (M-AT) found in RS series models, and 5-speed manual for the 25t RS FOUR S and 260RS.

New models and options for Series 2 included:

- 25t RS V - RS interior trim with RB25DET NEO in RWD configuration
- 25t RS Four S - RS interior trim with RB25DET NEO, 4WD, and 5-speed manual transmission
  - Type B Option for the two models above - a minimally equipped version with steel wheels meant for the customer to modify to their taste
- 1999 and up Prime Edition Option - Available on all 25RS and 25t RS model Stageas. Included premium leather and wood grain appointed interior
- 2000 and up Navi Edition Option - Available on all 20RS and 25RS model Stageas. Included an 8-inch LCD Multi-AV Compass Link system in the center console with updated Navigation system.
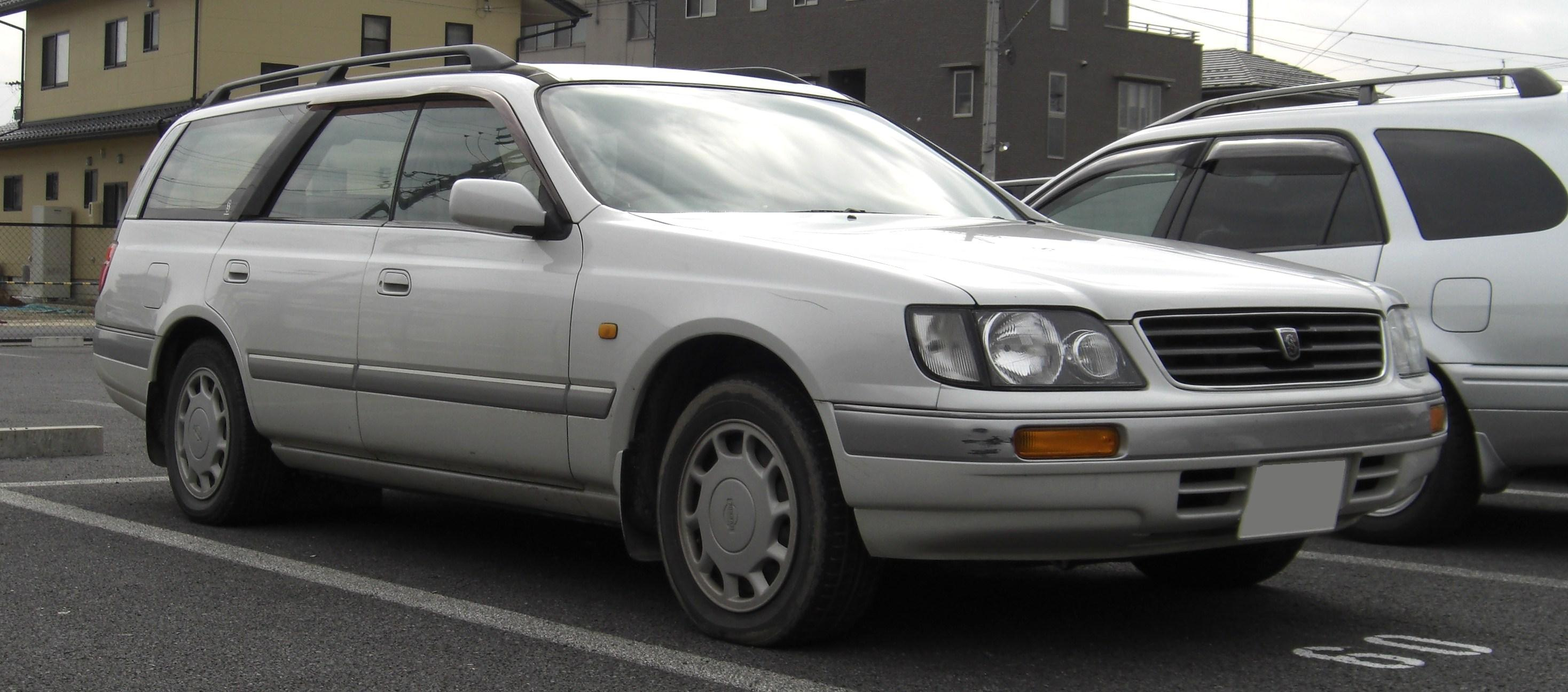
1996-1998 Stagea 25G FOUR (pre-facelift)

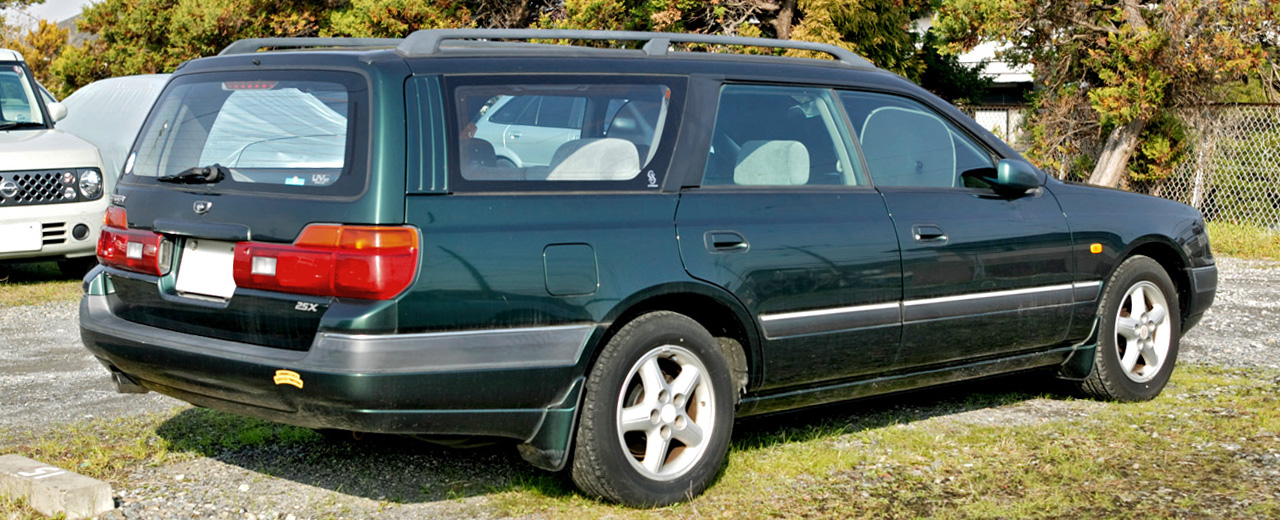
Rear view (pre-facelift)

=== Models by production date/series ===
| Series | Model name | Engine | Drivetrain | Transmission |
|---|---|---|---|---|
September 1996 - July 1997
| Series 1 | 25X | RB25DE | 2WD | E-AT |
| Series 1 | 25G | RB25DE | 2WD | E-AT |
| Series 1 | 20G | RB20E | 2WD | E-AT |
| Series 1 | 25X Four | RB25DE | 4WD | E-AT |
| Series 1 | 25G Four | RB25DE | 4WD | E-AT |
| Series 1 | RS Four | RB25DET | 4WD | E-AT |
| Series 1 | RS Four V | RB25DET | 4WD | E-AT |
August 1997 - July 1998
| Series 1.5 | 25X | RB25DE NEO | 2WD | E-AT |
| Series 1.5 | 25X Aero Limited | RB25DE NEO | 2WD | E-AT |
| Series 1.5 | 25G | RB25DE NEO | 2WD | E-AT |
| Series 1.5 | 20G | RB20DE NEO | 2WD | E-AT |
| Series 1.5 | 20X | RB20DE NEO | 2WD | E-AT |
| Series 1.5 | 25X Four | RB25DE NEO | 4WD | E-AT |
| Series 1.5 | 25X Four Aero Limited | RB25DE NEO | 4WD | E-AT |
| Series 1.5 | 25G Four | RB25DE NEO | 4WD | E-AT |
| Series 1.5 | 25t X Four | RB25DET | 4WD | E-AT |
| Series 1.5 | 25RS | RB25DE NEO | 2WD | E-AT |
| Series 1.5 | 25RS Four | RB25DE NEO | 4WD | E-AT |
| Series 1.5 | 25t RS Four | RB25DET | 4WD | E-AT |
| Series 1.5 | 25t RS Four V | RB25DET | 4WD | E-AT |
| Series 1.5 | 260RS Autech Version | RB26DETT | 4WD | 5MT |
August 1998 - March 2001
| Series 2 | 20G | RB20DE NEO | 2WD | E-AT |
| Series 2 | 20X | RB20DE NEO | 2WD | E-AT |
| Series 2 | 20RS | RB20DE NEO | 2WD | E-AT |
| Series 2 | 20RS Navi Edition | RB20DE NEO | 2WD | E-AT |
| Series 2 | 25X | RB25DE NEO | 2WD | E-AT |
| Series 2 | 25RS | RB25DE NEO | 2WD | M-AT |
| Series 2 | 25RS Prime Edition | RB25DE NEO | 2WD | M-AT |
| Series 2 | 25RS Navi Edition | RB25DE NEO | 2WD | E-AT |
| Series 2 | 25t RS V | RB25DET NEO | 2WD | M-AT |
| Series 2 | 25t RS V Prime Edition | RB25DET NEO | 2WD | M-AT |
| Series 2 | 25t RS V Type B | RB25DET NEO | 2WD | M-AT |
| Series 2 | 25X Four | RB25DE NEO | 4WD | E-AT |
| Series 2 | 25t X Four | RB25DET NEO | 4WD | E-AT |
| Series 2 | 25RS Four | RB25DE NEO | 4WD | M-AT |
| Series 2 | 25RS Four Prime Edition | RB25DE NEO | 4WD | M-AT |
| Series 2 | 25RS Four Navi Edition | RB25DE NEO | 4WD | E-AT |
| Series 2 | 25t RS Four V | RB25DET NEO | 4WD | M-AT |
| Series 2 | 25t RS Four V Prime Edition | RB25DET NEO | 4WD | M-AT |
| Series 2 | 25t RS Four S | RB25DET NEO | 4WD | 5MT |
| Series 2 | 25t RS Four S Type B | RB25DET NEO | 4WD | 5MT |
| Series 2 | 260RS Autech Version | RB26DETT | 4WD | 5MT |

=== Specs ===
- Frame: E-WGC34 (2WD); E-WGNC34 (4WD)
- Exterior dimensions (LxWxH): 4,800 mm (189.0 in) x 1,755 mm (69.1 in) x 1,495 mm (58.9 in)
- Interior dimensions (LxWxH): 1,900 mm (74.8 in) x 1,425 mm (56.1 in) x 1,155 mm (45.5 in)
- Wheel base: 2,720 mm (107.1 in)
- Treads (F/R): 1,460 mm (57.5 in) / 1,515 mm (59.6 in)
- Ground clearance: 145 mm (5.7 in)
- Kerb vehicle weight: 1,620 kg (3,571 lb)

== Second generation (M35; 2001) ==
Second generation (M35)
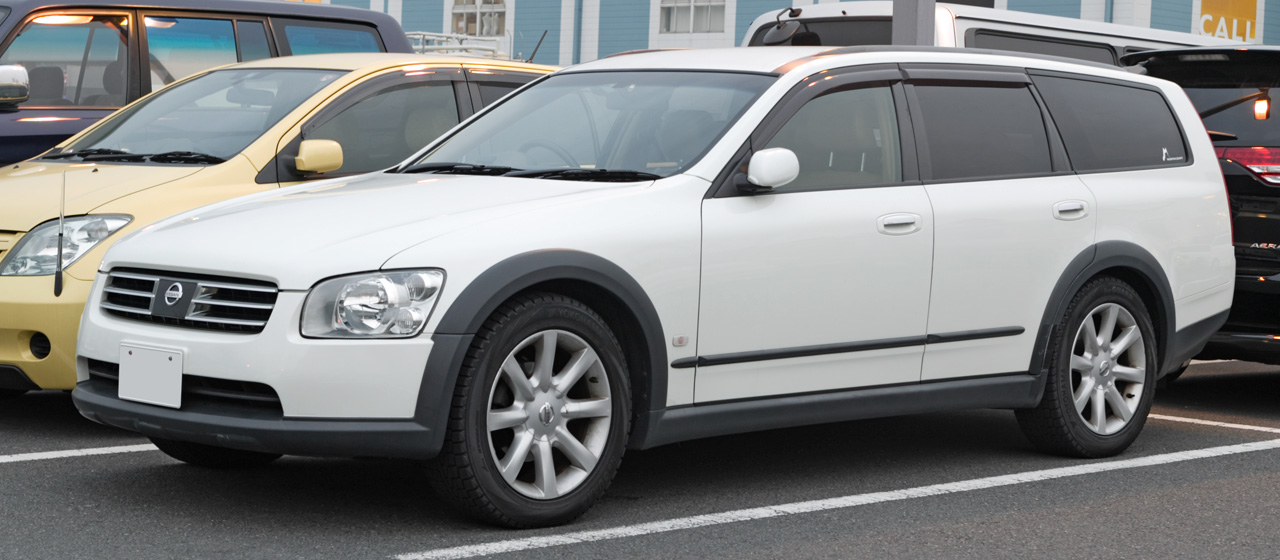
- M35 Nissan Stagea AR-X FOUR

Overview
- Production: October 2001 – 2007
- Assembly: Japan: Tochigi

Body and chassis
- Layout: Front mid-engine, rear-wheel-drive / all-wheel-drive
- Platform: Nissan FM platform
- Related: Nissan Skyline (V35)

Powertrain
- Engine: 2.5 L VQ25DD V6; 2.5 L VQ25DET turbo V6; 3.0 L VQ30DD V6; 3.5 L VQ35DE V6
- Transmission: 4/5-speed automatic; 6-speed manual (Autech 350S)

Dimensions
- Wheelbase: 2,850 mm (112.2 in)
- Length: 4,765–4,785 mm (187.6–188.4 in)
- Width: 1,760 mm (69.3 in)
- Height: 1,510 mm (59.4 in)
- Curb weight: 1,550–1,720 kg (3,417–3,792 lb)

Chronology
- Successor: Nissan Skyline Crossover (indirect; 4WD only)

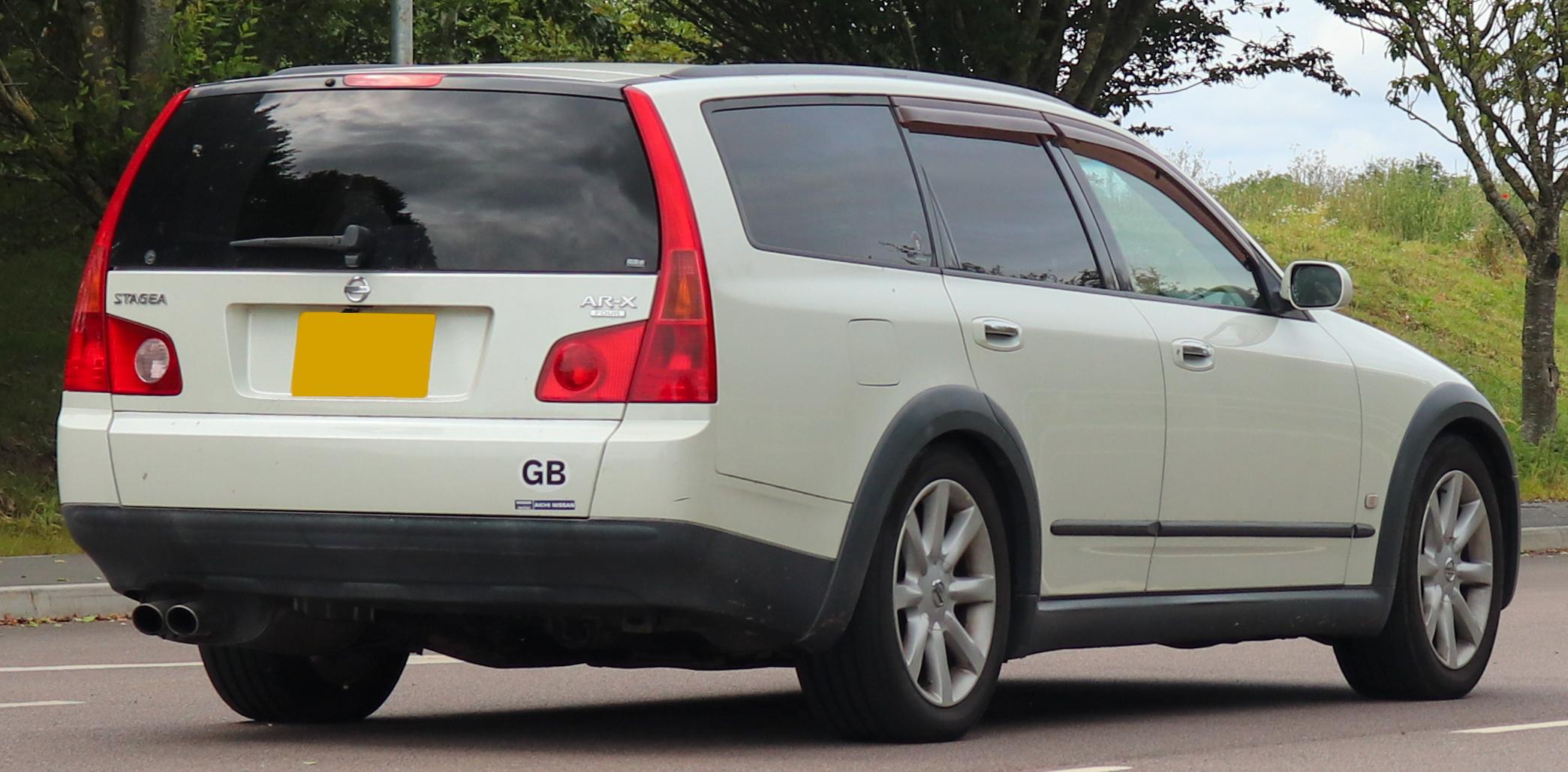
Rear view (ARX Four)

The M35 Stagea was released in October 2001. It is a wagon based on the FM package platform shared with the V35 Skyline sedan, which was released in June of the same year.

All engines were equipped with the V6 VQ series replaced the older RB series I6, and at launch, three types were available: the 2.5L VQ25DD and 3.0L VQ30DD V6 direct-injection engines shared with the V35 Skyline, as well as a newly developed 2.5L V6 intercooled turbo engine.。

The M35 was offered in: the "RS", which offers the ultimate in driving performance; the "RX" series, a luxury-oriented, and the "AR-X" series, a crossover-style, and the "t" for turbo.

Initially, only one grade which equipped with the 3.0-litre VQ30DD engine, the "300RX", while the 2.5L naturally aspirated engine model had three grades, from lowest to highest: "250RS," "250RS V," and "250RX." The other two grades, excluding the "250RS V," also had a four-wheel-drive version called "FOUR."

=== Series 1 ===
From October 2001 to August 2004, the following range of models were available:

- 250RS/RS V/RX: VQ25DD engine - V6 2.5L NA, direct injection, 158 kW (215 PS; 212 hp), rear-wheel drive
- 250RS FOUR/RX FOUR: VQ25DD engine - V6 2.5L NA, direct injection, 158 kW (215 PS; 212 hp), four-wheel drive
- 250tRS FOUR V/RX FOUR: VQ25DET engine - V6 2.5L single turbo, 206 kW (280 PS; 276 hp), four-wheel drive
- 300RX: VQ30DD engine - V6 3.0L NA, direct injection, 191 kW (260 PS; 256 hp), rear-wheel drive.
- 350S: VQ35DE engine - V6 3.5L NA, 206 kW (280 PS; 276 hp), Autech Axis Model, rear-wheel drive

There were a couple of sub-variants:

- 250tRS FOUR V HICAS: A 250tRS FOUR V with the addition of the Nissan HICAS four-wheel steering system
- AR-X FOUR: A 250t FOUR (i.e. 2,5L turbo/4wd) model with increased ride height and SUV-like body ornaments. 206 kW (280 PS; 276 hp)
- There were 4 'aero selection' models added in 2002 to the 250RS/250tRS FOUR/250tRS FOUR V/250tRS FOUR V HICAS ranges, this added a bodykit to the standard car.

=== Series 2 ===
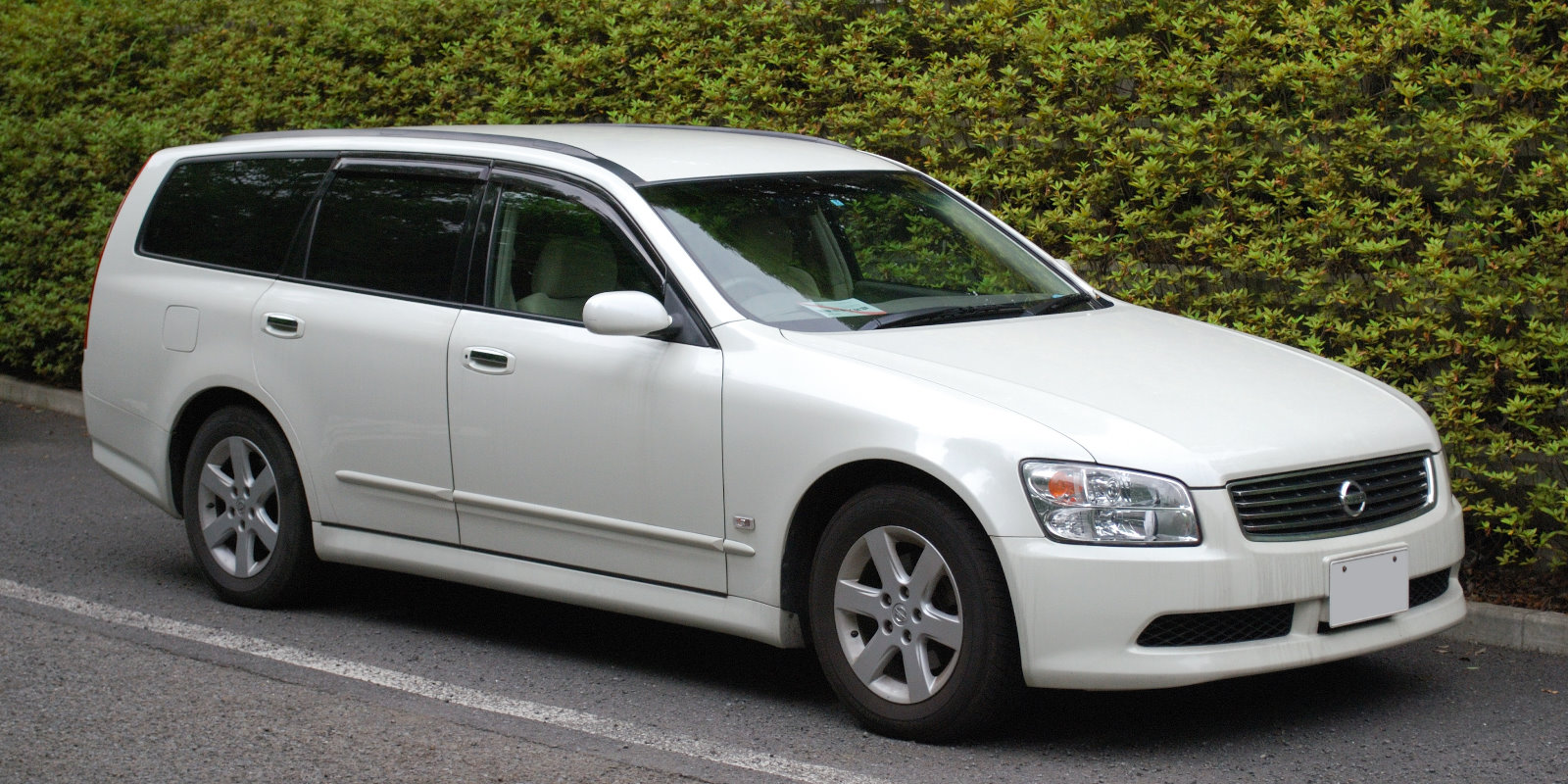

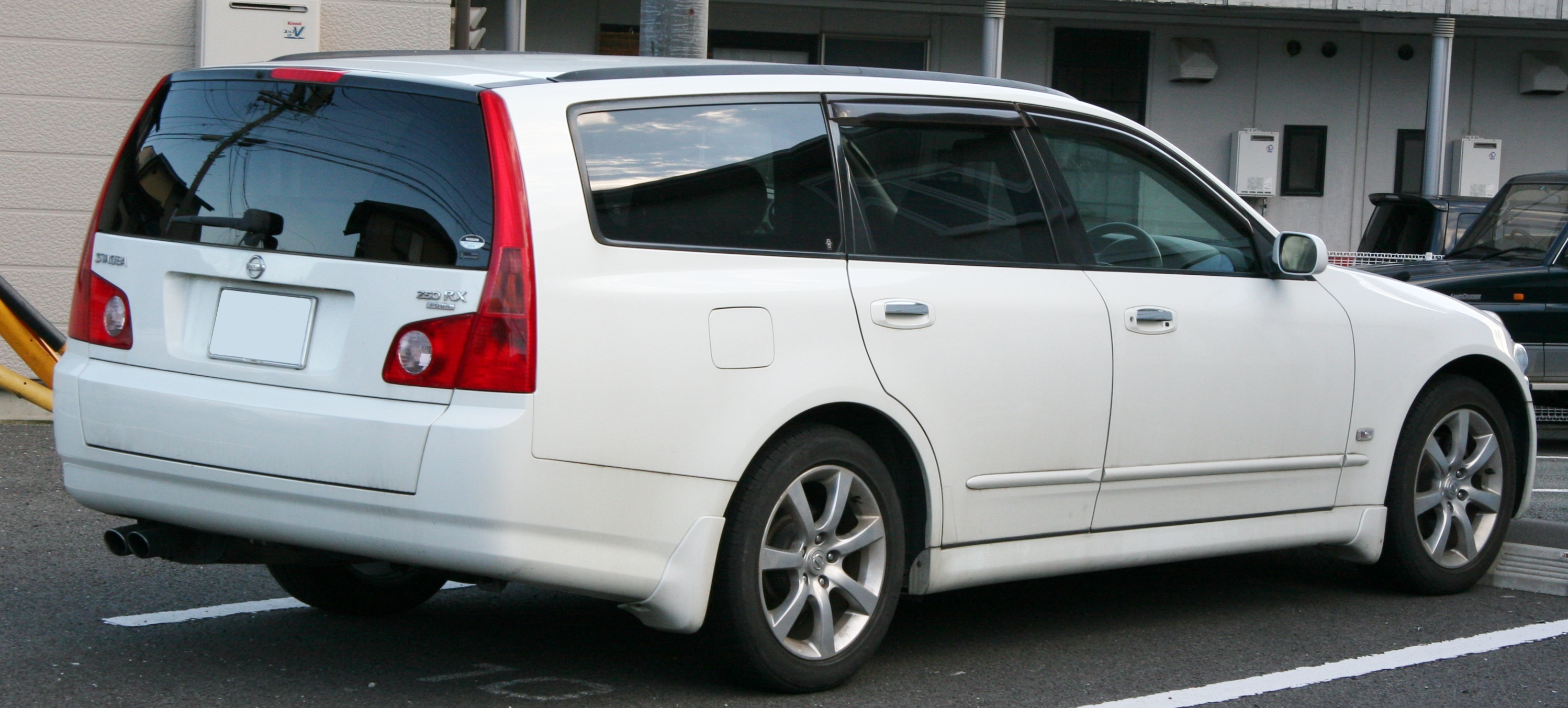
2004 Nissan Stagea (facelift)

In August 2004, the range was modified. The vehicle grade was reorganized into the RX and AR-X series. The facelift version was unveiled in August 2004, the front grille, front and rear bumpers, and 17-inch wheels were redesigned, and colored side guard moldings and sill protectors were fitted to all models.

- 250RX: VQ25DD engine - V6 2.5L NA, direct injection, 158 kW (215 PS; 212 hp), rear-wheel drive
- 250RX FOUR: VQ25DD engine - V6 2.5L NA, direct injection, 158 kW (215 PS; 212 hp), four-wheel drive
- 350RX: VQ35DE engine - V6 3.5L NA, 200 kW (272 PS; 268 hp), rear-wheel drive
- 350RX FOUR: VQ35DE engine - V6 3.5L NA, 200 kW (272 PS; 268 hp), four-wheel drive
- AR-X FOUR: VQ35DE engine - V6 3.5L NA, 200 kW (272 PS; 268 hp), four-wheel drive

=== Autech Axis ===
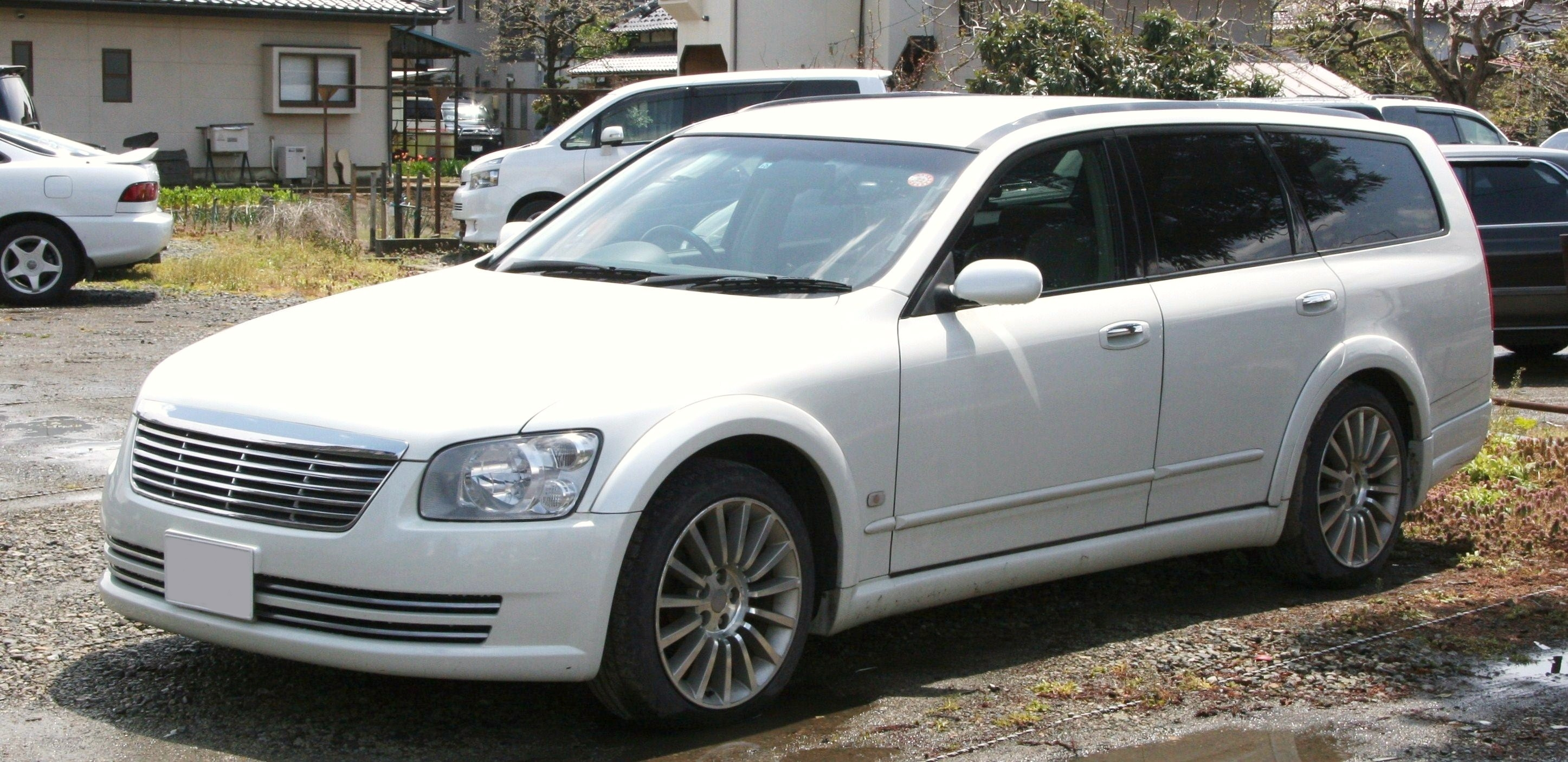

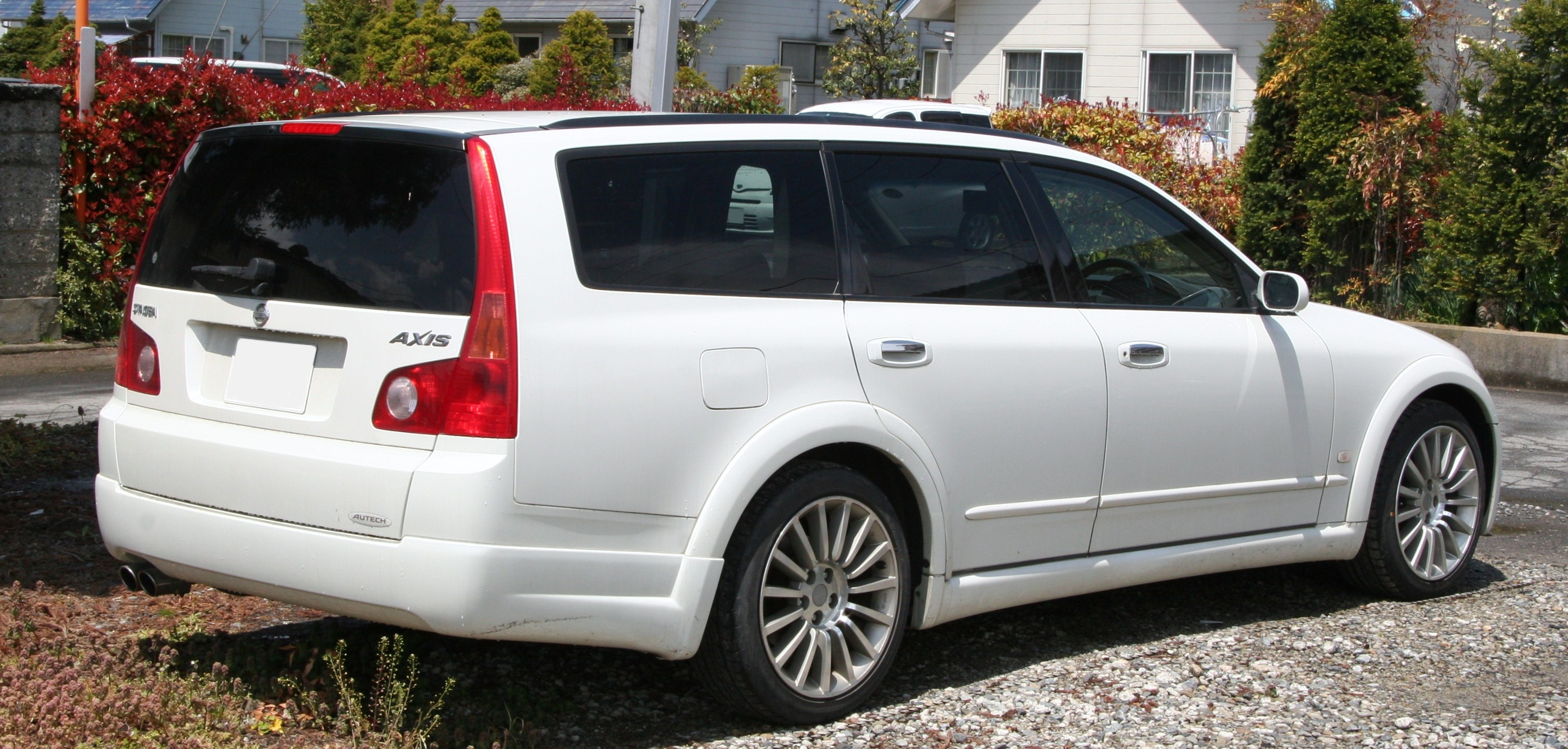
2002–2004 Nissan Stagea AXIS

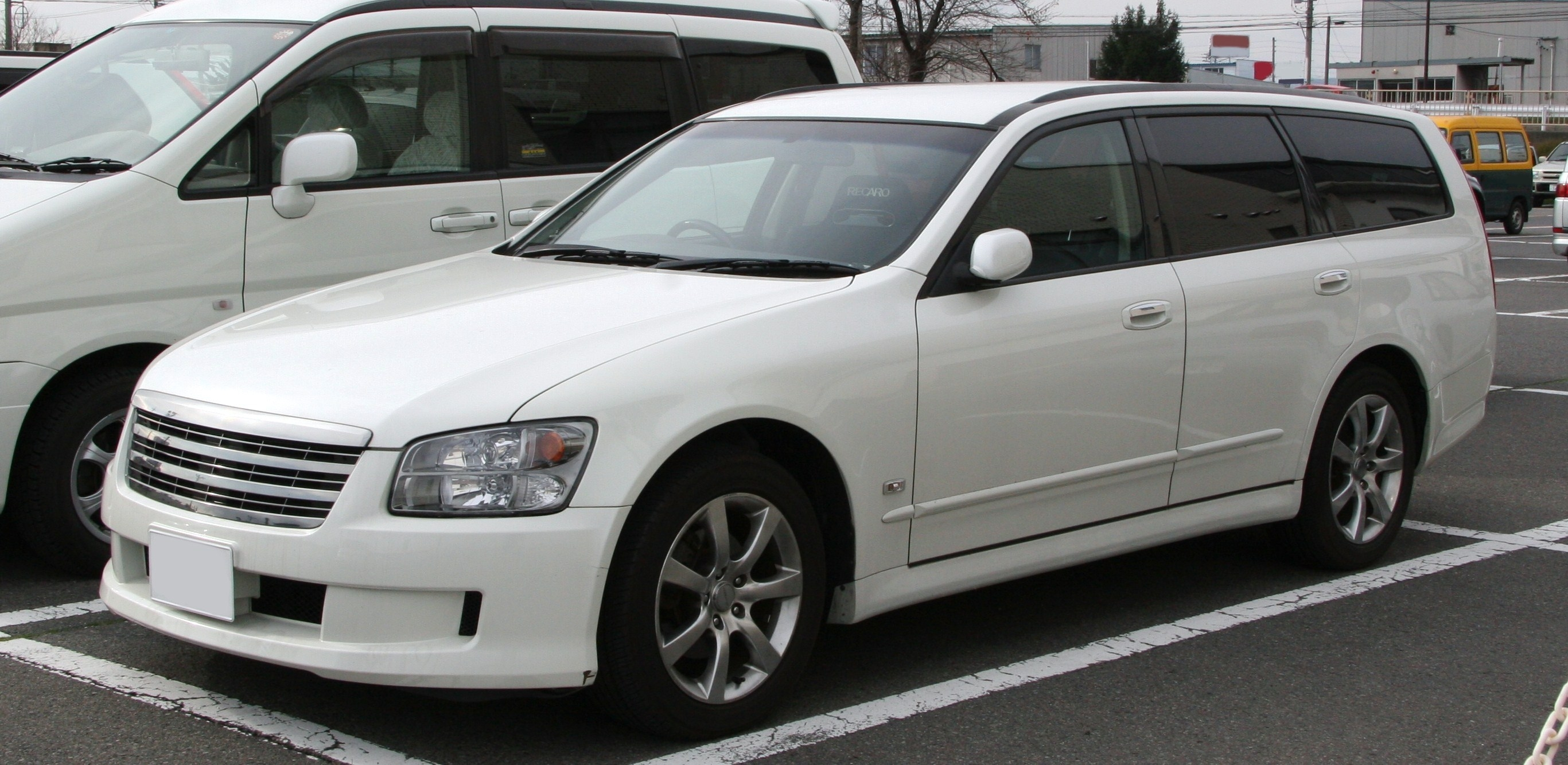
Facelifted Nissan Stagea Axis S

Released in January 2002 by Autech Japan, this model featured a dedicated front grille, front bumper, 18-inch aluminum wheels, overfenders, and colored side guard mouldings and sill protectors.

Four trim levels were available: a FR model with a 3.0L engine, FR and 4WD models with a 2.5L naturally aspirated engine, and a 4WD model with a 2.5L turbo engine. A minor facelift in August 2004 redesigned the front grille and bumper, and the lineup expanded to four trim levels: FR and 4WD models with a 2.5L VQ25DD engine, and FR and 4WD models with a 3.5-litre VQ35DE engine

=== Technical specification ===
Engine specification
| Production | Engine type | Engine displacement (cc) | Engine model | Transmission | Maximun Output (kW (PS)/rpm) | Maximun torque (Nm (kgm)/rpm) |
|---|---|---|---|---|---|---|
| October 2001-July 2007 | VQ35DE | 3,498 | V6 DOHC | 5-speed automatic with manual mode | 200 (272) / 6,000 | 353 (36.0) / 4,800 |
| June 2003 - August 2004 | VQ35DE | 3,498 | V6 DOHC | 6-speed manual | 206 (280) / 6,200 | 363 (37.0) / 4,800 |
| October 2001-August 2004 | VQ30DD | 2,987 | V6 DOHC direct injection | 5-speed automatic with manual mode | 191 (260) / 6,400 | 324 (33.0) / 4,800 |
| October 2001-July 2007 | VQ25DD | 2,498 | V6 DOHC direct injection | 4/5-speed automatic with manual mode | 158 (215) / 6,400 | 270 (27.5) / 4,400 |
| October 2001-August 2004 | VQ25DET | 2,498 | V6 DOHC turbo | 4/5-speed automatic with manual mode | 206 (280) / 6,400 | 407 (41.5) / 3,200 |

Dimensions
| Grades | Standard | | AR-X Four | Aero Selection | Axis | Axis S |
| Calendar year | 2001/10- 2004/08 | 2004/08- 2007/8 | 2001/10- 2007/8 | 2002/10- 2007/8 | 2002/01- 2007/8 | 2004/8- 2007/8 |
|---|---|---|---|---|---|---|
| Length | 4,765 | 4,785 | 4,800 | Same as Regular model | 4,815 | 4,820 |
| Width | 1,760 | | 1,790 | 1,760 | | |
| Height | 1,510 | | 1,550 | 1,490 (FR); 1,505 (4WD) | | |

== Discontinuation ==
Nissan ceased production of the Stagea in early June 2007, Nissan Japan stated that it would continue to sell the remaining stock of the vehicle but that production of the vehicle had ended. The model segment served by this vehicle was replaced by the Nissan Skyline Crossover.
