= ATTESA =

Four-wheel drive system for Nissan automobiles

ATTESA (acronym for Advanced Total Traction Engineering System for All-Terrain) is a four-wheel drive system used in some automobiles produced by the Japanese automaker Nissan, including some models under its luxury marque Infiniti.

The 'mechanical' ATTESA system was developed for transverse, or front-wheel-drive vehicles and was first introduced with the RNU12 Bluebird in the Japanese market, entering production in September 1987. The system ran right throughout the U12 series (RNU12/HNU12) and was fitted to numerous U12 models with differing engine and transmission combinations. An almost identical system is fitted to the RNN14 GTi-R Pulsar and the HNU13 Bluebird and the HNP10 Primera, finding usage in numerous other Nissan models.

Quite similar to offerings from other manufacturers, drive passes from the gearbox to a center viscous limited-slip differential, into a transfer case splitting drive to a co-located front differential, and tail shaft connected to the vehicle's rear differential.

From 2000 model year onwards, the system received an update where, as with a typical FWD car, the transaxle now contained a differential that drives the front wheels. However, an extra shaft from this differential also drives a bevel gear housed in the transfer case that permanently turns a driveshaft for the rear wheels (i.e. there is no longer a "center" differential). Housed in the rear differential is a viscous coupling that in normal conditions is disengaged. This means that for general driving, the system is FWD only. When the computer detects slippage of the front wheels, the viscous coupling engages and transfers up to 50% of the torque to the rear wheels. This system is superior in some aspects since the standard operation is FWD there is less power lost due to friction. However, it is no longer a full-time 4WD system, and since the coupling is in the rear differential, the driveshaft itself is constantly driven even though it is not connected to anything, which saps some power and efficiency (the analogue being the front driveshaft of a part-time 4x4 truck without locking hubs).

== Variations ==
=== E-TS ===
The Electronic Torque Split version of this all-wheel drive architecture is a more advanced system developed for Nissan vehicles with a longitudinal drive train layout. It was first used in August 1989 in the R32 Nissan Skyline GT-R and Nissan Skyline GTS-4. Although the Skyline GT-R is exclusively AWD with manual transmission, ATTESA E-TS is also used in Nissan models that are available as rear wheel drive (RWD) with automatic transmissions fitted, such as the A31 Nissan Cefiro which was the second Nissan to feature the system exactly a year later in August 1990, and vehicles based on the Nissan FM platform (which are sold in certain markets under the Infiniti luxury brand).

The ATTESA E-TS version uses a mostly conventional RWD transmission. Drive to the rear wheels is constant via a tailshaft and rear differential, but drive to the front wheels is more complex by utilizing a transfer case on the rear of the transmission. Front-to-rear torque split can go from 0:100 during acceleration to a maximum of 50:50.

The drive for the front wheels comes from a transfer case bolted on the end of an almost traditional Nissan RWD transmission. A short driveshaft for the front wheels exits the transfer case on the right side. Inside the transfer case a multi-row chain drives a multi-plate wet clutch pack. Drive from the chain is apportioned using this clutch pack in the transfer case "differential" (the system thus does not involve a regular gear differential as in a full-time 4WD layout, but rather a center clutch), similar to the type employed in the Steyr-Daimler-Puch system in the Porsche 959. This unit is lubricated with its own dedicated NS-ATF fluid supply (Nissan Special Automatic Transmission Fluid) and is not in any way connected to the fluid in the transmission. Some Nissan models have an external cooler with an electric pump to cool this fluid.

Situated on top of the rear differential is a high pressure, low volume electric pump. This pump pressurizes Normal ATF (0-288 psi) into the transfer case to engage the clutch pack. This fluid only engages the clutch pack and does not mix with the NS-ATF lubricating the transfer case. The higher the fluid pressure the transfer case is supplied with from the pump, the more the clutch pack engages, enabling the torque to the front wheels to be varied. Exiting the transfer case, the front drive shaft runs along the right side of the transmission, into a differential located on the right of the engines sump. This is a cast aluminum unit, with the sump and front differential made as a single unit that cannot be separated. The front right axle is shorter than the left, because the differential is closer to the right wheel. The front left axle runs through the engine's sump to the left wheel.

To control the ATTESA E-TS system, there is a 16-bit computer that monitors the cars movements 10 times per second to sense traction loss by measuring the speed of each wheel via the ABS sensors. Also a three-axis G-Sensor mounted underneath the center console feeds lateral and longitudinal inputs into a computer, which controls both the ATTESA-ETS AWD system and the ABS system. The computer can then direct up to 50% of the power to the front wheels. When slip is detected on one of the rear wheels (a rear wheel turn 5% or more than the front wheels), the system directs torque to the front wheels which run a non-limited slip differential. Rather than locking the AWD in all the time or having a system that is "all or nothing", the ATTESA E-TS system can apportion different torque ratios to the front wheels as it sees fit. This provides the driver with an AWD vehicle that performs like a rear wheel drive vehicle in perfect conditions and can recover control when conditions aren't as perfect.

From the factory, the system is set up to provide slight oversteer in handling, and in fact the harder the car is cornered, the LESS the AWD system engages the front wheels. This promotes the oversteer rather than understeer which is apparent in most AWD/4WD vehicles. The advantage to a more traditional ATTESA (viscous LSD) system is response in hundredths of a second.

Some models fitted with the ATTESA E-TS system (such as the Nissan RS4 Stagea) have an "S" button on the dash. This will bypass the control system of the ATTESA E-TS computer and lock the transfer case into full 4WD. This is to be used at low speeds in snowy/icy conditions only as understeer is greatly increased in this mode.

=== E-TS Pro ===
In 1995, with the introduction of the R33 Skyline GT-R, Nissan introduced a new version of their ATTESA system. It was named ATTESA-ETS Pro, as an upgrade from the earlier ATTESA-ETS. It was standard equipment in the R33 & R34 Skyline GT-R V.spec (Victory Specification) model, and was offered as an option on the standard Skyline GT-R models called the "Active LSD option". The active rear LSD was also available as an option on some rear wheel drive Nissans such as the R33 GTS25t, the C34 RS Stagea and Y33 Cima S-Four..

ATTESA E-TS Pro differs from the standard ATTESA E-TS in a few ways. Where ATTESA E-TS controls the front to rear torque-split, the Pro system is also capable of left-and-right torque split to the rear wheels. This is done via an active rear LSD. Additionally, ATTESA E-TS Pro was marketed as controlling the ABS system to each wheel independently, while the previous ABS computer could sense the speed of each wheel its ABS pump is only 3-channel (both rear brakes are linked as a pair). Although this is not part of the AWD system, the computer makes use of the same sensors to determine wheel slip and traction.

On ATTESA E-TS Pro equipped vehicles, the front differential remains a standard differential, not being linked to the ATTESA E-TS Pro system.

The R33 Skyline regularly updates the speed of the rear wheels to the wheel speed sensors 100 times per second while the R34 Skyline regularly updates the speed of the rear wheels to the wheel sensors 1,000 times per second.

The 2009 Nissan GT-R uses an updated version of the ATTESA E-TS, which is designed to work with the car's rear transaxle layout. The system is unique in the way that it utilizes two driveshafts under the vehicle's centerline, with a second driveshaft running slightly to the right of the main driveshaft which transfers power to the front wheels.

Unlike the previous ATTESA systems which relied heavily on mechanical feedback, the system in the GT-R uses electronic sensors and hydraulically actuated clutches. It also has a yaw-rate feedback control system, effectively managing slip angle. Front-to-rear torque split can go from 2:98 during a standing start to a maximum of 50:50.

== Models and types ==
Nissan Model	Year released	ATTESA type
Avenir	1990	ATTESA
Avenir	1998	ATTESA
Bluebird	1987	ATTESA
Primera	1991–1999	ATTESA
Prairie	1989	ATTESA
Prairie	1992	ATTESA
Prairie	1994	ATTESA
Pulsar	1989	ATTESA
Pulsar	1997	ATTESA
Pulsar	1999	ATTESA
Sunny	1989	ATTESA
Sunny	1992	ATTESA
Sunny	1997	ATTESA
Sunny	2000	ATTESA

ATTESA E-TS system is used in the following models:

- R32 and R33 (1989–1997) GT-R, GTS-4 Skyline
- Y32 and Y33 1992-2001 Nissan Cima Type II Limited S-Four
- 1990–1994 Nissan Cefiro SE4, LNA31
- Nissan Skyline GT-R - 1989–2003
- Nissan Stagea
- Nissan Laurel C34 (1994–1997) and C35 (1997–2002)
- 1997–2003 Infiniti QX4
- Infiniti G35x/G25x/G37x/Nissan Skyline (V35 & V36)
- Infiniti M35x/45x/37x/56x/Nissan Fuga
- Infiniti QX70
- Infiniti EX/Nissan Skyline Crossover (with Active Brake Limited Split for side-to-side torque split, as needed)
- Nissan Cedric (Gloria/Cedric with RB25DET engine)
- Nissan Skyline Sedan 350GT FOUR Hybrid/Infiniti Q50

ATTESA E-TS Pro system is used in the following models:

- R33 (1995–1997) Nissan Skyline GT-R (offered as a factory option)
- R33 Nissan Skyline GT-R V-spec
- R34 (1998–2002) Nissan Skyline GT-R V-spec, V-spec II and M-spec
- 2008+ Nissan GT-R (different implementation)

== See also ==
- 4Matic - a four-wheel drive system from Mercedes-Benz
- 4motion - a four-wheel drive system from Volkswagen
- All-Trac - a four-wheel drive system from Toyota
- Nissan Bluebird
- Nissan Pulsar
- Nissan Skyline
- Nissan Skyline GT-R
- Nissan GT-R
- Quattro (four wheel drive system) - a four-wheel drive system from Audi
- S-AWC - a torque vectoring four-wheel drive system from Mitsubishi Motors
- SH-AWD - a four-wheel drive system from Honda
- Symmetrical All Wheel Drive - the four wheel drive system from Subaru
