= Infiniti M =

Executive car by Infiniti (1989 - 2019)

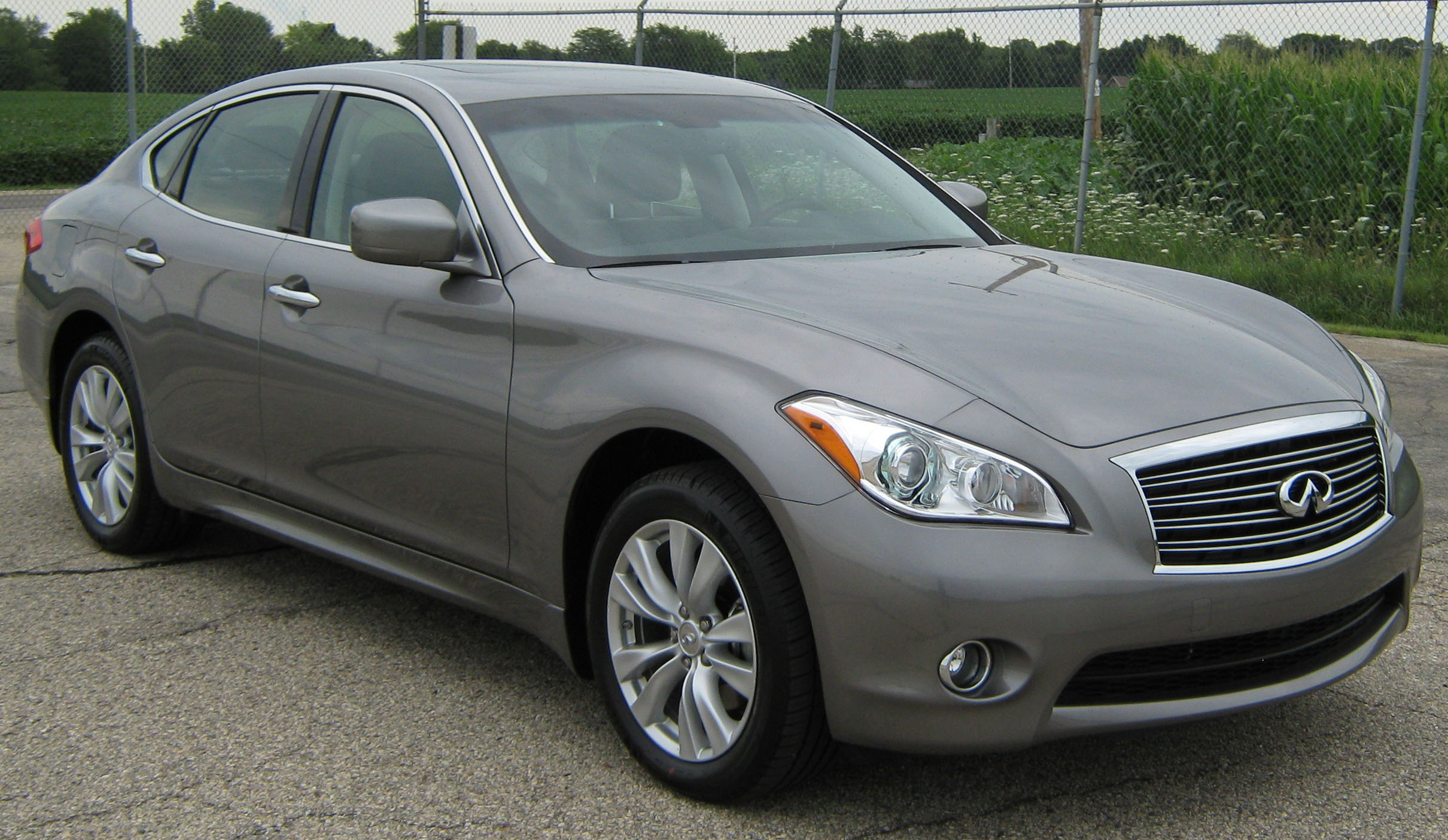
- 2011 Infiniti M37

Overview
- Manufacturer: Nissan
- Also called: Infiniti Q70 (2013–2019); Nissan Fuga (SWB; 2009–2022); Nissan Cima (hybrid LWB; 2012–2022)
- Production: 1989–1992 (M30 coupé) 2002–2019 (M sedan)

Body and chassis
- Class: Executive car
- Body style: 4-door sedan
- Platform: Nissan FM platform

Chronology
- Predecessor: Infiniti I Infiniti J30
- Successor: Infiniti Q70 (renamed to)

The Infiniti M is a line of mid-size luxury (executive) cars from the Infiniti luxury division of Nissan. From 2013 (model year 2014) on it has been marketed as the Infiniti Q70, reflecting the company's later naming formula.

The first iteration was the M30 Coupé/Convertible, rebadged variants of the JDM Nissan Leopard. After a hiatus, the M nameplate was used for Infiniti's short-lived mid-luxury M45 sedan, a rebadged version of the Japanese-spec Nissan Gloria and Infiniti's subsequent flagship M35/45 and M37/56/35h/30d, based on the JDM Nissan Fuga.

== First generation (1989–1992) ==
Infiniti M30
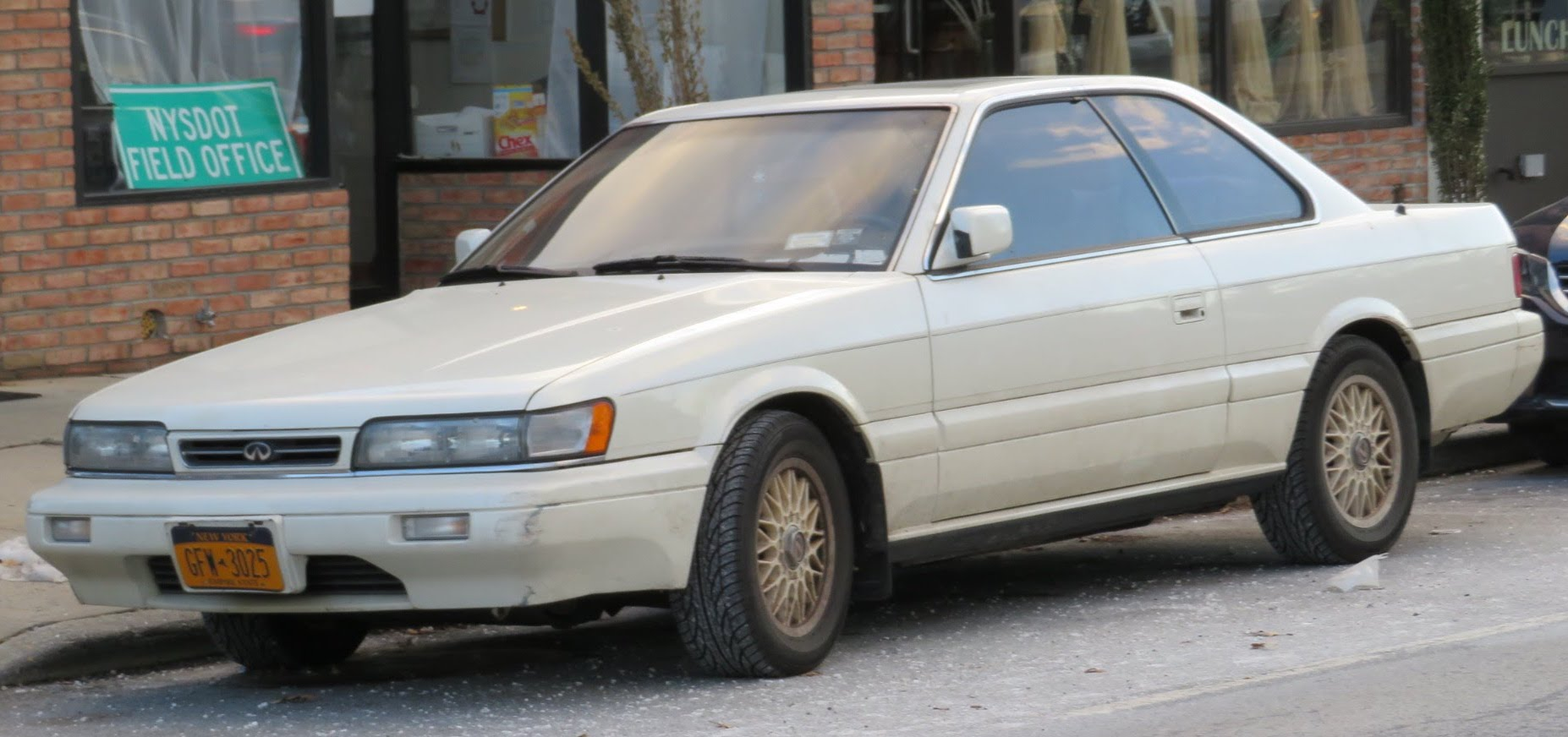

Overview
- Model code: F31
- Also called: Nissan Leopard
- Production: 1989–1992
- Model years: 1990–1992
- Assembly: Japan: Musashimurayama, Tokyo

Body and chassis
- Class: Mid-size luxury car/Executive car
- Body style: 2-door convertible 2-door coupé
- Layout: Front-engine, rear-wheel-drive
- Related: Nissan Skyline R31; Nissan Laurel C32; Nissan Cefiro A31; Autech Zagato Stelvio AZ1

Powertrain
- Engine: 3.0 L VG30E V6
- Transmission: 4-speed RE4R01A automatic

Dimensions
- Wheelbase: 2,616 mm (103.0 in)
- Length: 4,796 mm (188.8 in)
- Width: 1,689 mm (66.5 in)
- Height: 1,321 mm (52.0 in)
- Curb weight: 1,498 kg (3,303 lb) (coupe); 1,622 kg (3,576 lb) (convertible)

Chronology
- Successor: Infiniti G37 Cabrio

The Infiniti M30 was a 2-door coupé based on the Japanese market Nissan Leopard (chassis code F31). It was launched in 1989 for the 1990 model year as a lower-priced alternative to the Infiniti Q45, and was intended to be an alternative to the Acura Legend coupe and to a lesser extent the Lexus ES 250, as it was also a lower-priced alternative to the Lexus LS400, although the ES 250 was only offered as a 4-door sedan.

Unlike its competitors that were designed with the American market in mind and were launched as brand-new models, the M30 was based on a somewhat dated platform that was originally designed for the Japanese market; when the Leopard was imported to the United States, few changes were made to the exterior but the interior was revised to better suit American tastes; a leather interior was standard in the M30, and several features in the Leopard such as a center-mounted television screen and a digital instrument cluster weren't available in the M30 as those features were perceived as gimmicks in western car markets.

The M30's angular design aesthetics and on-road performance were viewed as outdated, especially considering a redesigned Acura Legend coupe was launched in 1991. The interior came in for criticism for its outdated ergonomics and lack of room. While the Japanese-market Leopard had received a new dashboard along with the 1988 facelift, economics precluded making a left-hand-drive version of the new dashboard and the M30 was instead fitted with the LHD version of the R31 Skyline's rectilinear dashboard, first presented in 1985.

The M30 made up for these deficiencies in its somewhat lower price; whereas the 1990 Acura Legend coupe started at $27,325 before options and the 1990 BMW 325i started at $24,650 before options, the M30 started at $23,500, and had no factory options, per Infiniti's pricing structure used at the time. Dealerships offered an in-car cellular telephone and in-dash CD player as optional accessories, amongst other items.

=== Overview ===
Standard equipment on the M30 included a driver's side airbag, anti-lock brakes, an anti-theft security system with an engine immobilizer, Nissan Sonar Suspension II, and leather upholstery. Other standard features include a 4 speaker Nissan-Bose audio system with satellite radio controls, a cassette player and an electric mast antenna, cruise control, power windows, power door locks, power mirrors, power moonroof, and on coupes, automatic climate control.

For the 1991 model year, the cable-type speedometer became electric, instrument cluster typeface changed to match that of the Q45, and fuel and coolant temperature gauges were switched. An illuminated entry feature was added that would light the driver's and passenger's door keyhole and the interior dome light upon pulling the outer door handle. Selective door lock logic was added that allowed unlocking of the passenger door from the driver's keyhole by turning the key twice.

A convertible was introduced for the 1991 model year. All convertibles originated as coupe models, and were shipped to California and converted by American Sunroof Corporation (ASC). The electric canvas top featured fully automatic push-button operation, similar to the redesigned 1990 Mercedes-Benz SL, although the SL used a hydraulic system. Unlike the coupe, the M30 convertible use manual climate controls, and a Bose Active Sound audio system. The convertible top used a plastic rear window; as a result the rear window defroster feature used on the coupe was removed, and buttons to raise and lower the convertible top were put in place of the rear window defroster switch. The convertible model was never officially sold in Japan, and was exclusive to the US market, although convertibles have been imported to Japan in the last few years by collectors.

All 1992 models gained the addition of a central locking switch next to the Sonar Suspension II selector, and the intake plenum cover was revised and displayed the Infiniti logo, rather than the Nissan logo and the "V6 3000" script on 1990 and 1991 cars.

The M30 was discontinued after the 1992 model year following a production run of approximately 17,000 cars. It was replaced in the Infiniti lineup by the J30 sedan, which was based on the F31 Nissan Leopard's successor, the Nissan Leopard J. Ferie (chassis code Y32).

=== Technical ===
Power came from Nissan's VG30E V6, which produced 162 hp (121 kW; 164 PS) at 6000 rpm, and 180 lb⋅ft (244 N⋅m) of torque at 3500 rpm. All M30s had a Jatco RE4R01A 4-speed automatic transmission. The differential was a Nissan open R200 unit. Although most Nissan Leopards were equipped with a DOHC V6, offered in 2-liter, 3-liter, naturally aspirated and turbocharged variants, the M30 was only offered with the SOHC VG30E. Although it was a smooth powertrain, which Infiniti touted in its brochures for the M30, the 3,302 lb (1,498 kg) coupe, and 3,523 lb (1,598 kg) convertible were generally received as overweight and underpowered, with a quoted 0–60 time of 9.4 and 9.7 seconds, respectively. Infiniti marketed the car as a luxury sports coupe, but its relatively low power output, comfort-oriented driving dynamics, and the absence of a manual transmission hampered its performance and sporting image.

Like the Nissan Maxima, the M30 was equipped with Nissan's Sonar Suspension II. A sonar sensor mounted underneath the front bumper scanned the road surface ahead of the vehicle and instantly changed damping based on varying road surfaces, using individual actuators on all shock absorbers. A center console-mounted switch allowed drivers to choose between Comfort (soft) and Sport (firm) suspension modes. All M30s used MacPherson struts for the front wheels, and a semi-trailing arm rear suspension with coil springs for the rear.

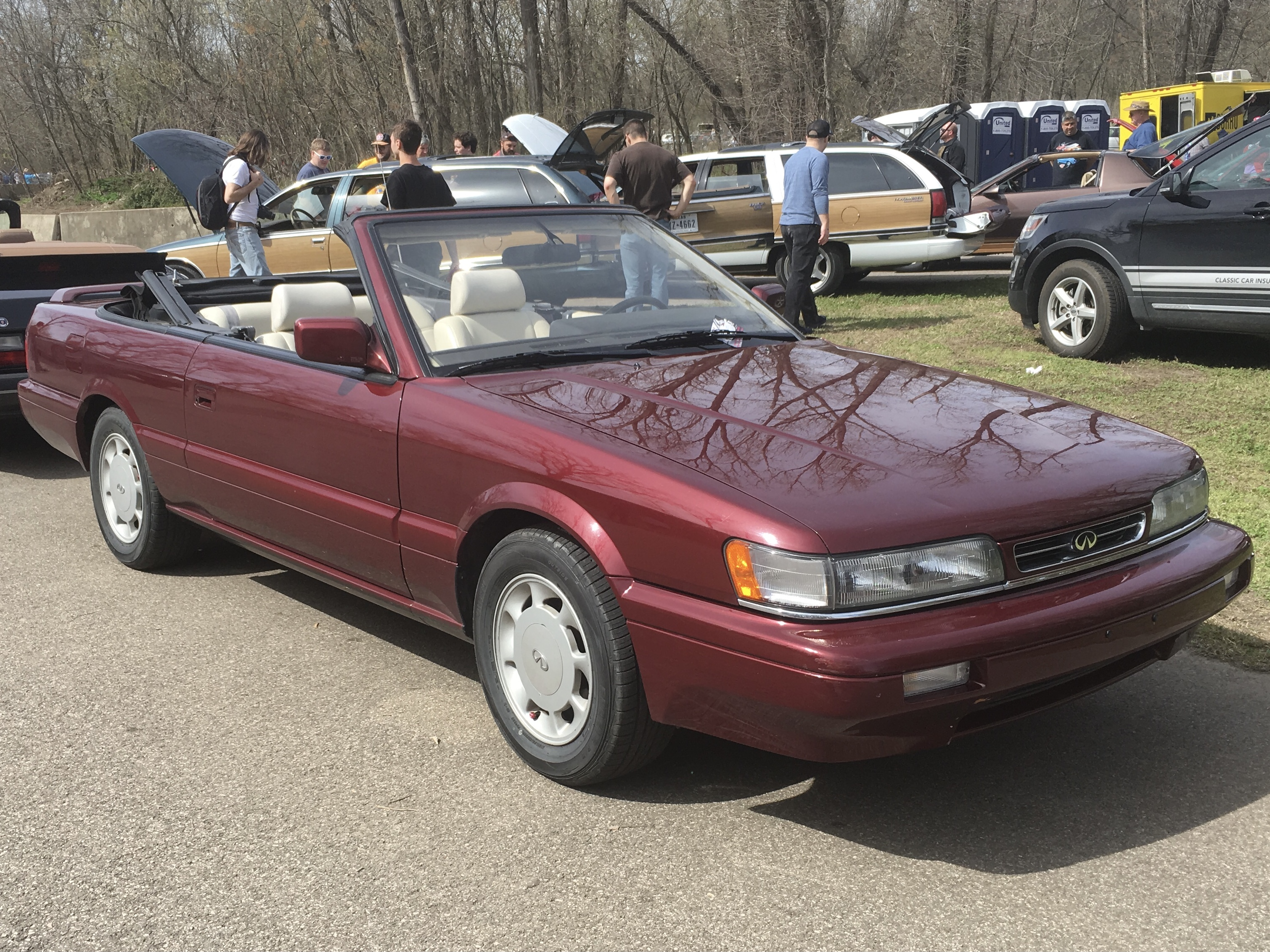
1990–1992 M30 convertible

== Second generation (2002–2004) ==
Infiniti M
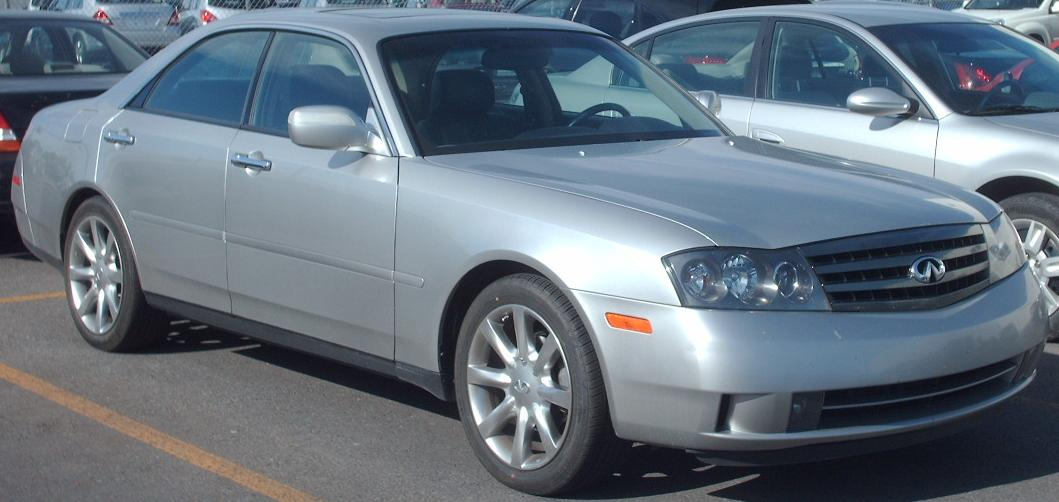

Overview
- Model code: Y34
- Also called: Nissan Cedric; Nissan Gloria
- Production: 2002 – December 2004
- Model years: 2003–2004
- Assembly: Japan: Kaminokawa, Tochigi

Body and chassis
- Layout: FR layout
- Related: Infiniti Q45; Nissan Cima; Nissan Gloria

Powertrain
- Engine: 4.5L VK45DE 340 hp (254 kW) V8
- Transmission: 5-speed automatic

Dimensions
- Wheelbase: 2,799 mm (110.2 in)
- Length: 5,009 mm (197.2 in)
- Width: 1,770 mm (69.7 in)
- Height: 1,463 mm (57.6 in)
- Curb weight: 3,851 lb (1,747 kg)

Infiniti M45 was designed in 2000 at the Nissan Technical Center (NTC) in Atsugi, Japan; was manufactured in Tochigi, Japan; and is based on eleventh generation, Y34-series Nissan Gloria. In contrast to the Japanese models, which were available only with 6-cylinder engines, the M45 was powered by Nissan's VK45DE V8, producing 340 hp (254 kW) and 333 lb⋅ft (451 N⋅m) of torque, which it shared with the Infiniti's flagship Q45.

In addition to the difference in powertrain with the Y34 Cedric/Gloria, the Y34 M45 uses a different instrument panel design, similar to the F50 Q45 as well as a different rear multi-link suspension design. The Y34 Cedric/Gloria's rear multi-link suspension design is similar to the Nissan Z32 300ZX, and Nissan S14/S15 Silvia/200SX/240SX where the rear spring is mounted on the strut. The rear suspension design on the Y34 M45 is much like the rear suspension design on the Nissan Z33 350Z, where the spring is mounted independent of the shock/strut, and sits directly on the lower arm, in a spring cup.

The front suspension design carries over from the Y33 Q45, with a one-piece strut/upright. In place of the stamped steel front lower arm, the Y34 M45 has a cast aluminum lower A-arm.

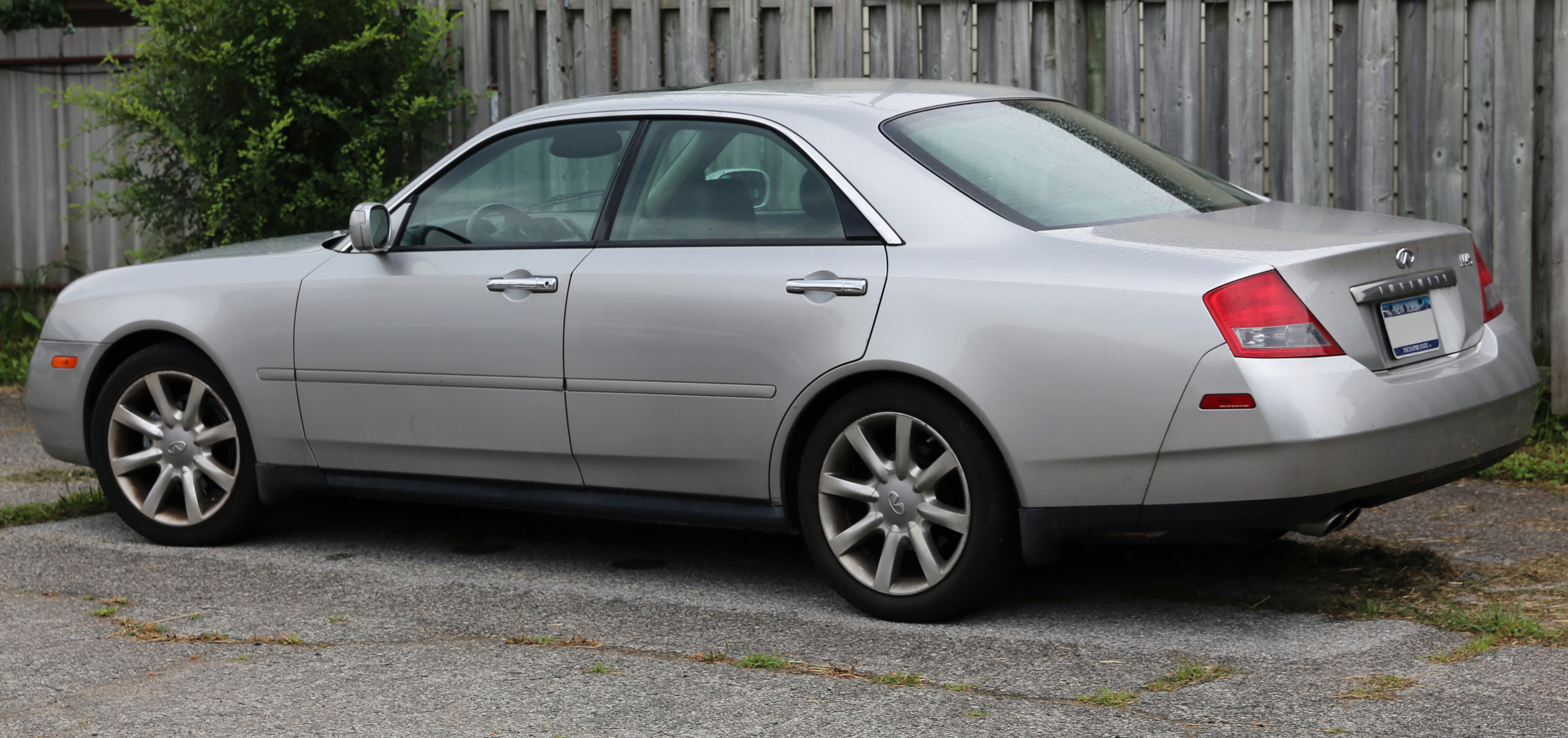
2003–2004 Infiniti M45

The M45 broadened Nissan's use of the 4.5L V8 that had been exclusive to the Q45, allowing the company to better amortize the engine's development cost.

== Third generation (2005–2010) ==
Infiniti M
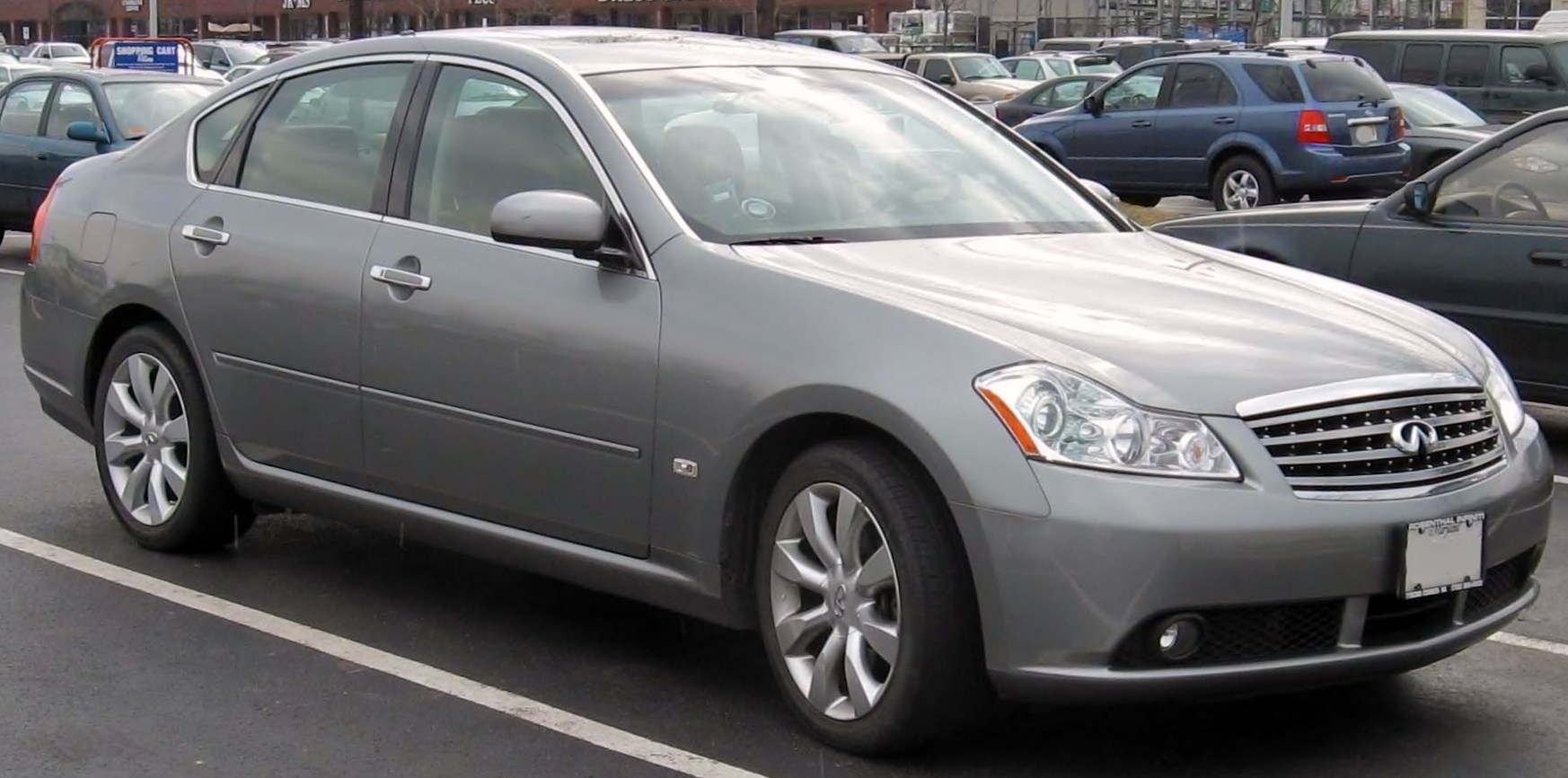

Overview
- Model code: Y50
- Also called: Nissan Fuga
- Production: December 2004–2010
- Model years: 2006–2010
- Assembly: Japan: Kaminokawa, Tochigi
- Designer: Michinari Chiba (2002)

Body and chassis
- Layout: Front engine, rear-wheel drive / All-wheel drive
- Platform: FM-L "enhanced FM"
- Related: Infiniti FX; Infiniti G35; Nissan 350Z; Infiniti G37; Infiniti EX35

Powertrain
- Engine: 3.5L 280 hp (209 kW) VQ35DE V6; 3.5L 303 hp (226 kW) VQ35HR V6; 4.5L 325 hp (242 kW) VK45DE V8
- Transmission: 5-speed automatic; 7-speed automatic

Dimensions
- Wheelbase: 2,901 mm (114.2 in)
- Length: 2006–07: 4,892 mm (192.6 in); 2008–2010: 4,930 mm (194.1 in)
- Width: 1,798 mm (70.8 in)
- Height: 1,509 mm (59.4 in) (M35 & M45); 1,511 mm (59.5 in) (M35 & M45 Sport); M35x: 1,524 mm (60.0 in)

Infiniti released a redesigned M for the 2006 model year, released in February 2005, and marketed in Japan as the Nissan Fuga. All-wheel-drive models, marketed as the M35x and M45x, use a system (ATTESA-ETS) to send all power to the rear wheels until slip is detected. As the Q45 was no longer exported from Japan after model year 2006, the M45 became Infiniti's flagship.

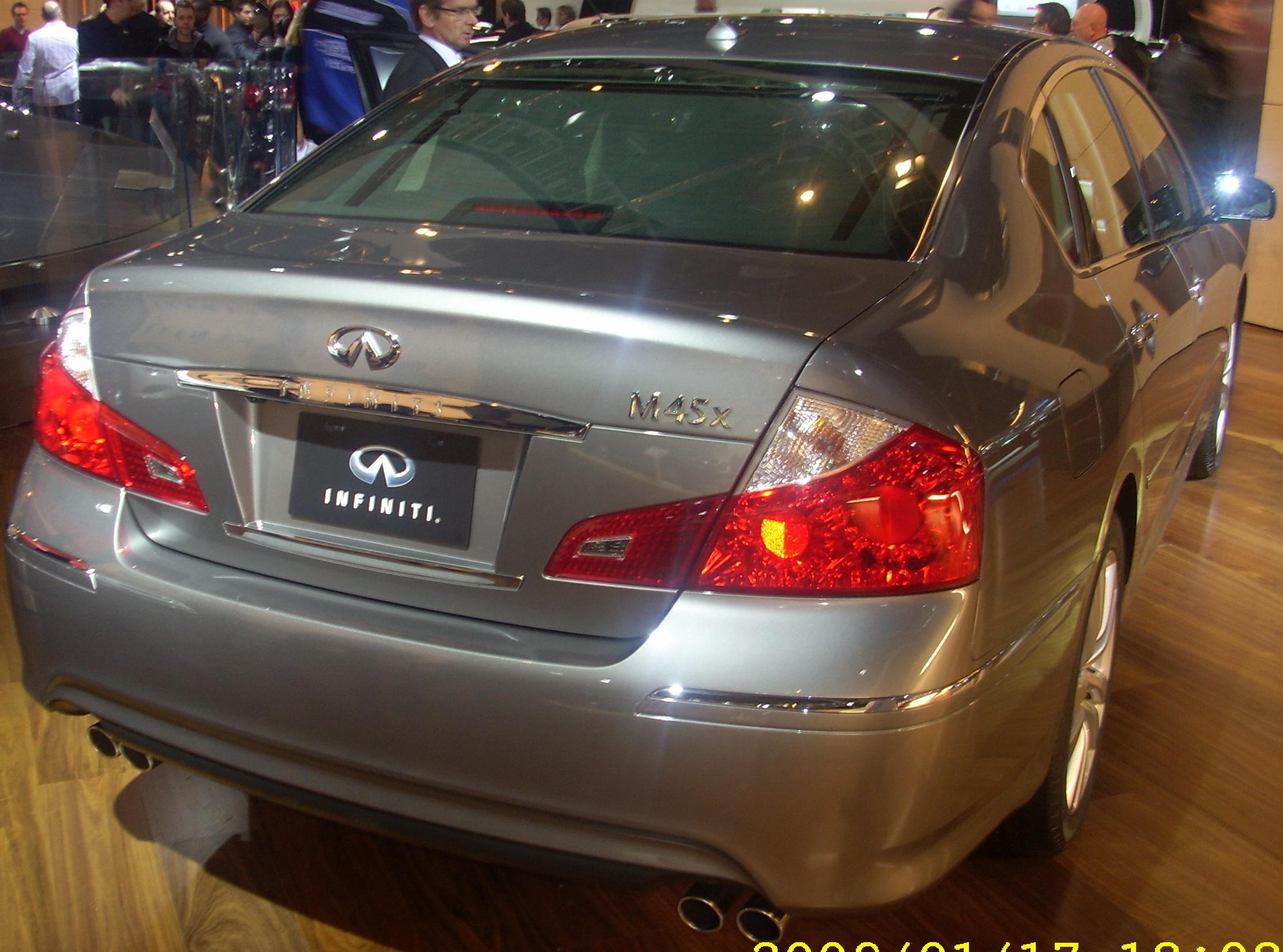
Infiniti M45x rear

The M used a more rigid version of the Nissan FM platform shared with the G35/350Z/FX — and was available with the VQ-series 280 hp (209 kW) 3.5 L V6 in the M35, or the Q45's 335 hp (250 kW) 4.5 L V8 in the M45.

While shorter 177 mm (7.0 in) than the last Q45 at 5,069 mm (199.6 in), the M offered greater interior space, performance, a rear multilink suspension and front double wishbone, and improved ergonomics as well as a 30 mm (1.2 in) longer wheelbase.

=== Reception ===
In the automotive press, several reviewers praised the M35 and M45's driving involvement and handling dynamics vs the GS and E-Class while having superior ergonomics to the 5 Series; furthermore the M was equipped and priced competitively against its German rivals, while the M35 also received strong reviews. Despite entering a very crowded, competitive segment in which almost every member has been recently redesigned, the M managed to claim several key distinctions. The M is near or at the top of its class of every interior dimension, actually breaking into the United States Environmental Protection Agency "large" category depending on which option packages are selected. The M35x won Consumer Reports top luxury car pick for 2006, taking the top spot from the 2005 Lexus LS 430.

The Infiniti M did not gain a significant share in the mid-luxury market. The Infiniti G37 sedan and coupe, competing in the entry-level luxury sport category, accounted for half of the marque's sales as of 2009. Out of that year's 81000 Infiniti cars sold, only 10000 were of the M nameplate. Furthermore, the 2009 update left M35 and M45 in awkward positions of the Infiniti lineup, as though they were the flagships of the marque, they were out-powered by the VQ37VHR engines fitted in the 2009 G37 coupe and sedan. For that model year while the G Series received 7-speed automatic transmissions across the lineup, only the M35 RWD was upgraded to a 7-speed automatic while the rest of the nameplate retained the aging 5-speed automatic.

=== 2008/2009 Mid-generational refresh ===
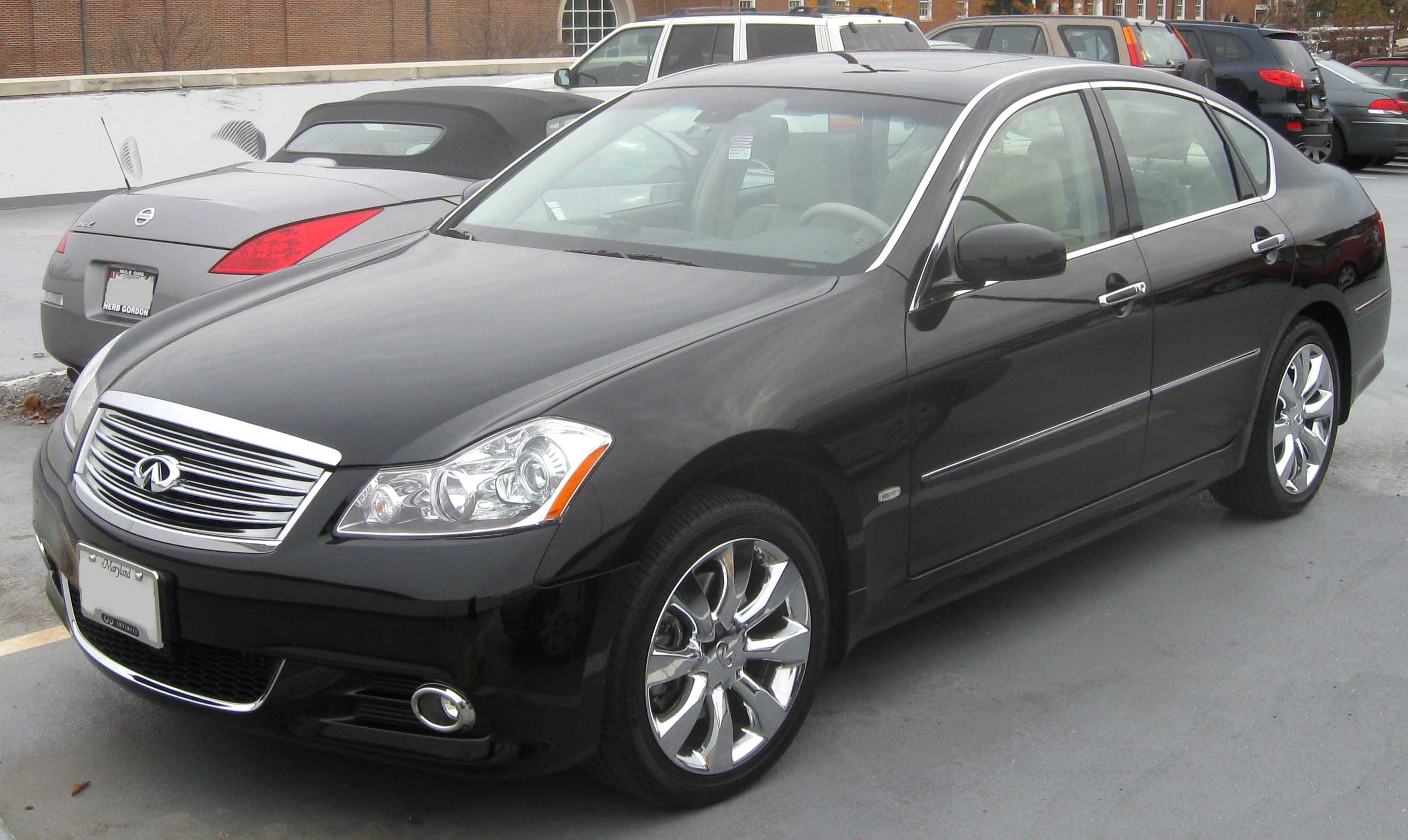
2008 Infiniti M35x

For the 2008 model year, the Infiniti M received a facelift, receiving optional all wheel drive (M45x), revised front and rear fascias, revised tail lights, and redesigned blue-highlighted gauges, previously orange. Infiniti also offered an S type version for the M45/M45x similar to the previous Sport model. Other new features on the 2008 model include touch screen hard drive based navigation, iPod integration, and a music hard drive.

For 2009, the M35 received a new V6 engine producing 303 hp (226 kW) and 262 lb⋅ft (355 N⋅m) of torque and a 7-speed automatic transmission. The 2009 M35x, M45, and M45x retained the five-speed automatic.

== Fourth generation (2010–2019) ==
Infiniti M / Q70
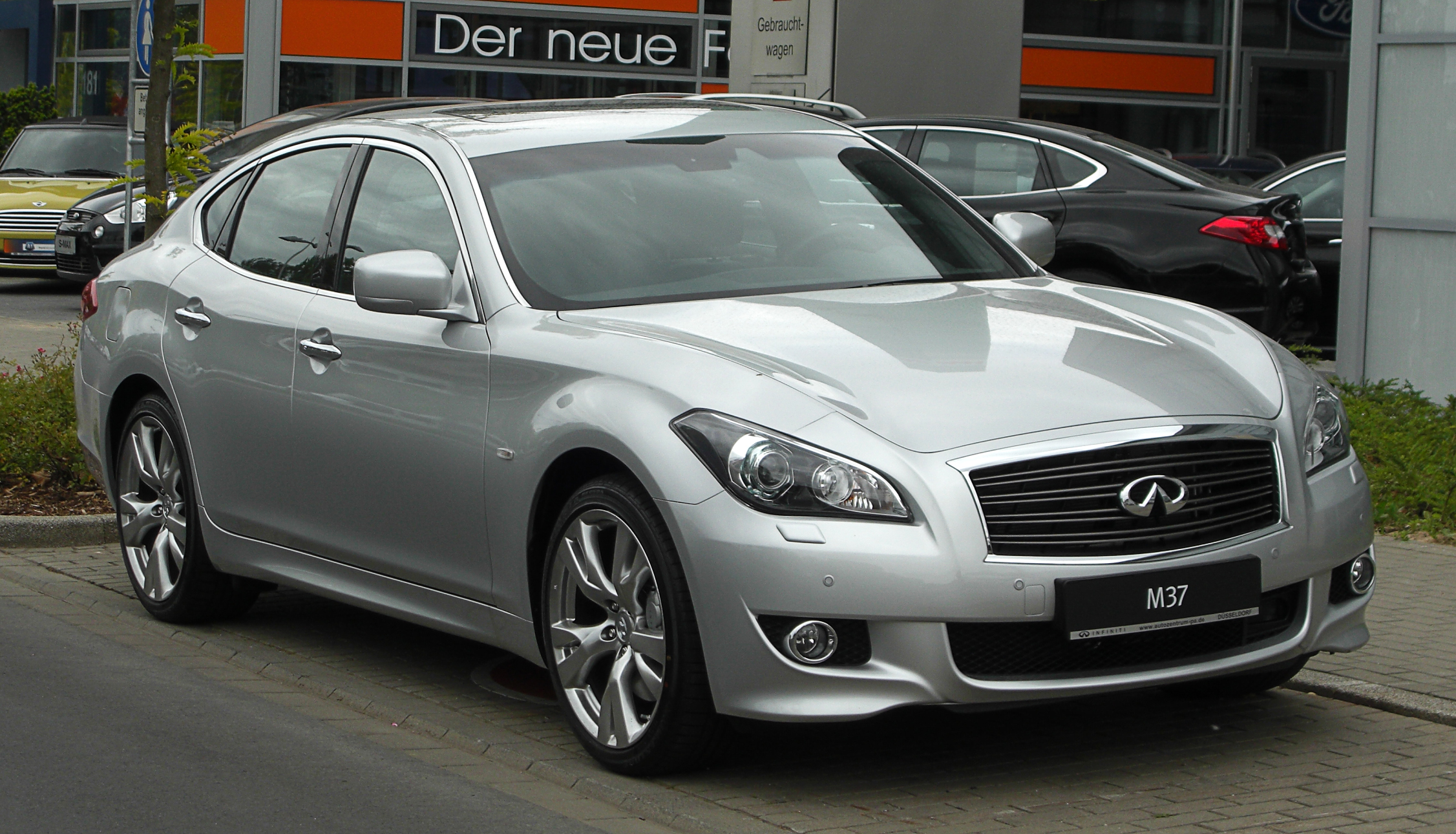
- Infiniti M37 S (Europe)

Overview
- Model code: Y51
- Also called: Nissan Fuga/Mitsubishi Proudia/Infiniti Q70; Nissan Cima/Mitsubishi Dignity/Infiniti Q70L (LWB)
- Production: December 2009–2019
- Model years: 2011–2019 (USA & Canada)
- Assembly: Japan: Kaminokawa, Tochigi; Russia: Saint Petersburg (SKD, 2012–2014)
- Designer: Hideo Komuro (2007, 2008)

Body and chassis
- Layout: Front engine, rear-wheel drive / All-wheel drive
- Platform: FM-L "enhanced FM"
- Related: Infiniti FX; Infiniti G35; Infiniti G37; Infiniti EX35; Nissan 370Z; Nissan 350Z; Nissan Cima

Powertrain
- Engine: 2.5L V6 VQ25HR; 3.0L V6 V9X turbo diesel 3.5L V6 VQ35HR hybrid 3.7L V6 VQ37VHR; 5.6L V8 VK56VD
- Electric motor: 68PS Nissan HM34 high-response Motor (3.5 L models only)
- Transmission: 7-speed automatic
- Hybrid drivetrain: Intelligent Dual Clutch Control
- Battery: 1.4 kWh Li-ion

Dimensions
- Wheelbase: 2,900 mm (114.2 in); 3,051 mm (120.1 in) (Q70L)
- Length: 4,945 mm (194.7 in); 5,131 mm (202.0 in) (Q70L)
- Width: 1,845 mm (72.6 in)
- Height: 1,509 mm (59.4 in)

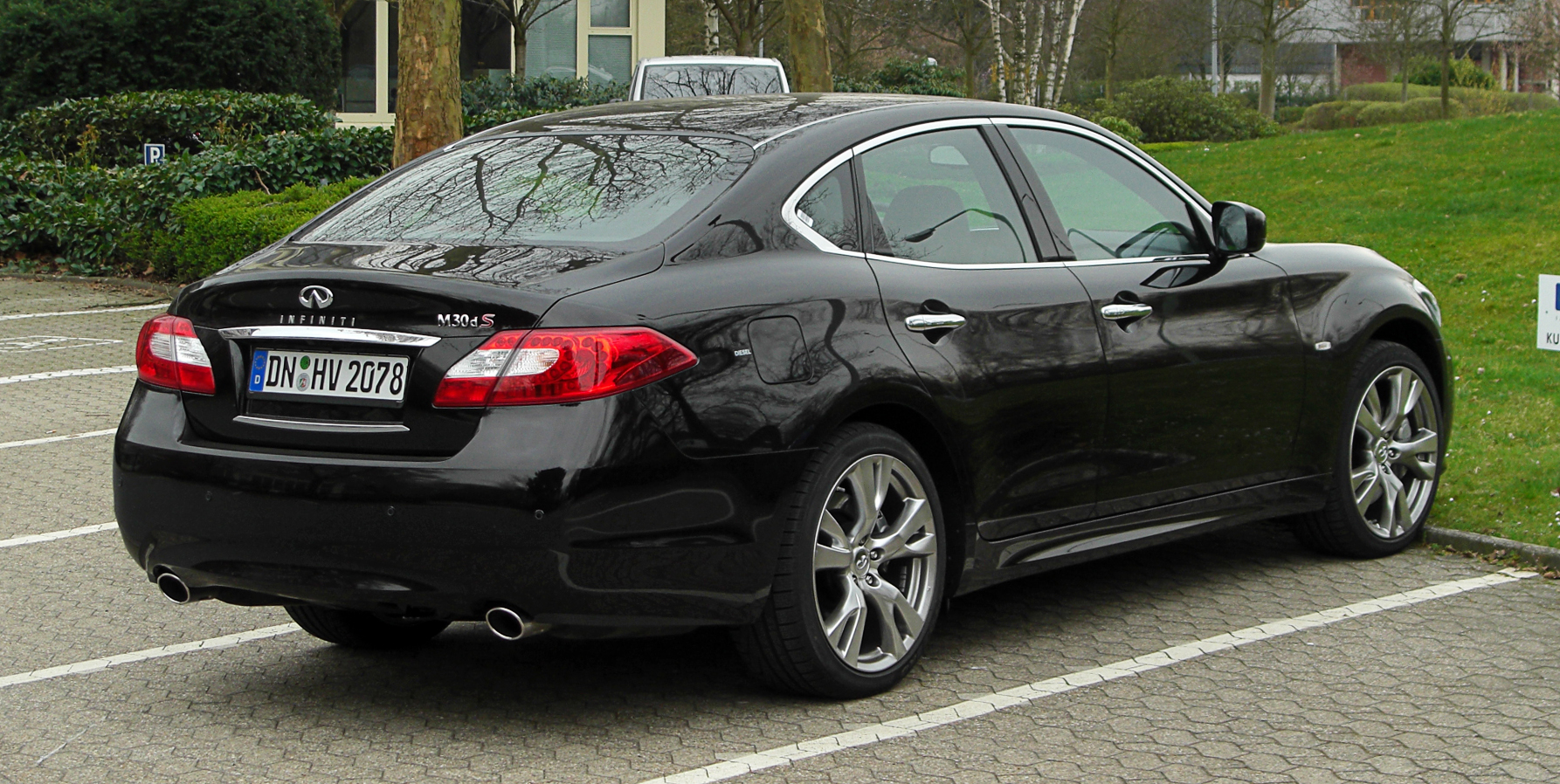
Infiniti M30d S (Germany)

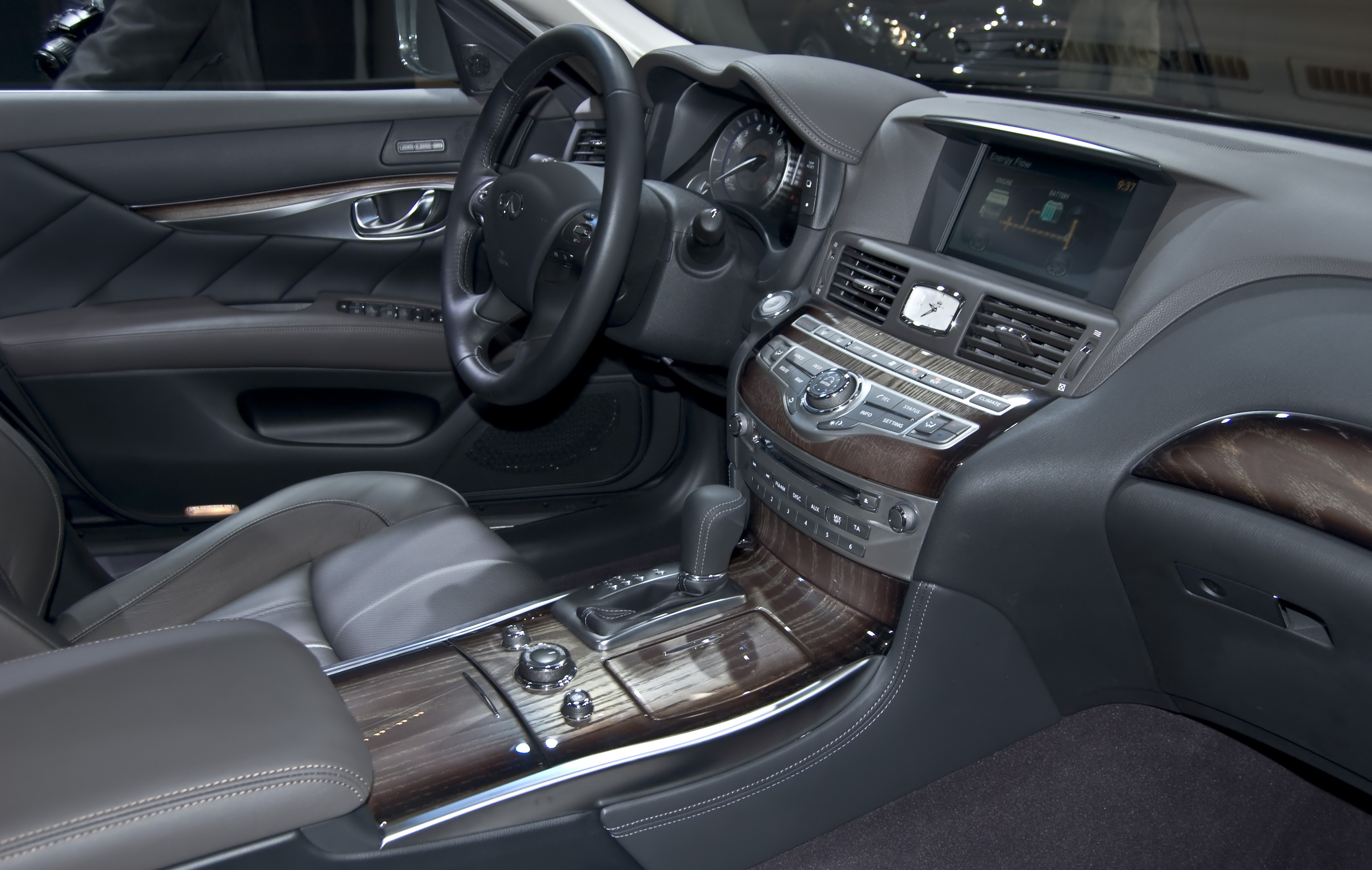
Interior

The Y51, designed by Hideo Komuro during 2006 and 2008 under the supervision of Shiro Nakamura, took on a more fluid look, recalling the coke bottle styling of a 1960s and 1970s.

The 2011 Infiniti M debuted at the 59th Annual Pebble Beach Concours d'Elegance, and at a media event in Beverly Hills, California in December 2009, to coincide with the LA Auto Show in Los Angeles. The production version went on sale globally starting in the spring of 2010, as a 2011 model — and in the US on March 1, 2010. It was launched in Europe at the 2010 Geneva Motor Show.

A driving mode selector was included on all models, situated below the transmission gear lever and between the heated and ventilated front seat controls, providing four selections labeled "Standard", "Sport", "Eco", and "Snow", allowing the 7-speed transmission, engine and various systems to optimize driving in varying conditions. To minimize intrusion of exhaust noise in the passenger compartment, the M included a noise cancelling system marketed as Active Noise Control. Double-piston shock absorbers, developed by Kayaba Industry Company, have replaced those previously supplied by Hitachi.

The 5.6L V8 VK56VD in the Infiniti M56 was competitive with other V8 mid-luxury (executive) cars such as the BMW 550i and Mercedes-Benz E550. The 5.6L V8 is not shared with its Japanese domestic market counterpart, the Nissan Fuga, as Nissan opted instead to have the hybrid version as the performance option. The extended length version of the Fuga, known as the Cima, is offered as the Infiniti Q70L beginning from model year 2015.

The M37 and M56 will have all-wheel drive optional, badged as M37x and M56x, respectively.

Safety technology included Lane Departure Prevention, which uses a small camera mounted above the rearview mirror to gauge distance from the lane markers, and would lightly deploy selected brakes to help ease the car into the correct lane. It allowed for unimpeded lane changes when the turn signal is used and yields control to the driver at all times. Blind Spot Intervention System used sensors to provide a visual warning in the side view mirror. If the car sensed movement toward an obstacle, it provided an audible warning and applied opposite side brakes to guide the vehicle to the correct lane.

=== Safety ===
The third generation Infiniti M models were given a "Top Safety Pick" by the Insurance Institute for Highway Safety (IIHS) by earning a "Good" score for all four IIHS crash tests while also featuring standard stability control to help avoid accidents altogether.

=== Engines ===
Gasoline engines
Model	Years	Type/code	Power, torque@rpm
M25	2011–	2,495 cc (152.3 cu in) V6 24-valve (VQ25HR)	218 hp (163 kW; 221 PS) @ 6,400, 186 lb⋅ft (252 N⋅m) @4,800
M37	2010–	3,696 cc (225.5 cu in) V6 24-valve VVEL (VQ37VHR)	330 hp (246 kW; 335 PS)@ 7,000, 270 lb⋅ft (366 N⋅m) @5,200
M56	2010–	5,552 cc (338.8 cu in) V8 32-valve VVEL direct injection (VK56VD)	420 hp (313 kW; 426 PS) @ 6,000, 417 lb⋅ft (565 N⋅m) @4,400
M35h	2011–	3,498 cc (213.5 cu in) V6 24-valve (VQ35HR)	303 hp (226 kW; 307 PS) @ 6,800, 264 lb⋅ft (358 N⋅m) @ 4,800
M35h	2011–	electric motor	59 PS (43 kW; 59 PS)@? 199 lb⋅ft (270 N⋅m) @?

Diesel engines
Model	Years	Type/code	Power, torque@rpm
M30d	2010–2014	2,993 cc (182.6 cu in) V6 24-valve turbodiesel (V9X)	237 hp (177 kW; 240 PS) @ 3,750, 406 lb⋅ft (550 N⋅m) @ 1,750–2,500

=== M35h (Hybrid version) (2011–2019) ===
The Infiniti M Hybrid, sold as the Nissan Fuga Hybrid in Japan where it was the top performance trim, introduced Nissan's first in-house developed electric hybrid technology, and the carmaker claimed it doubles the fuel economy of its gasoline-powered version. Nissan also announced that the Nissan Infiniti/Fuga Hybrid, together with the Nissan Leaf, included its new Vehicle Sound for Pedestrians system to alert pedestrians, the blind and others to their presence when the hybrid is operating at low speeds in all-electric mode.

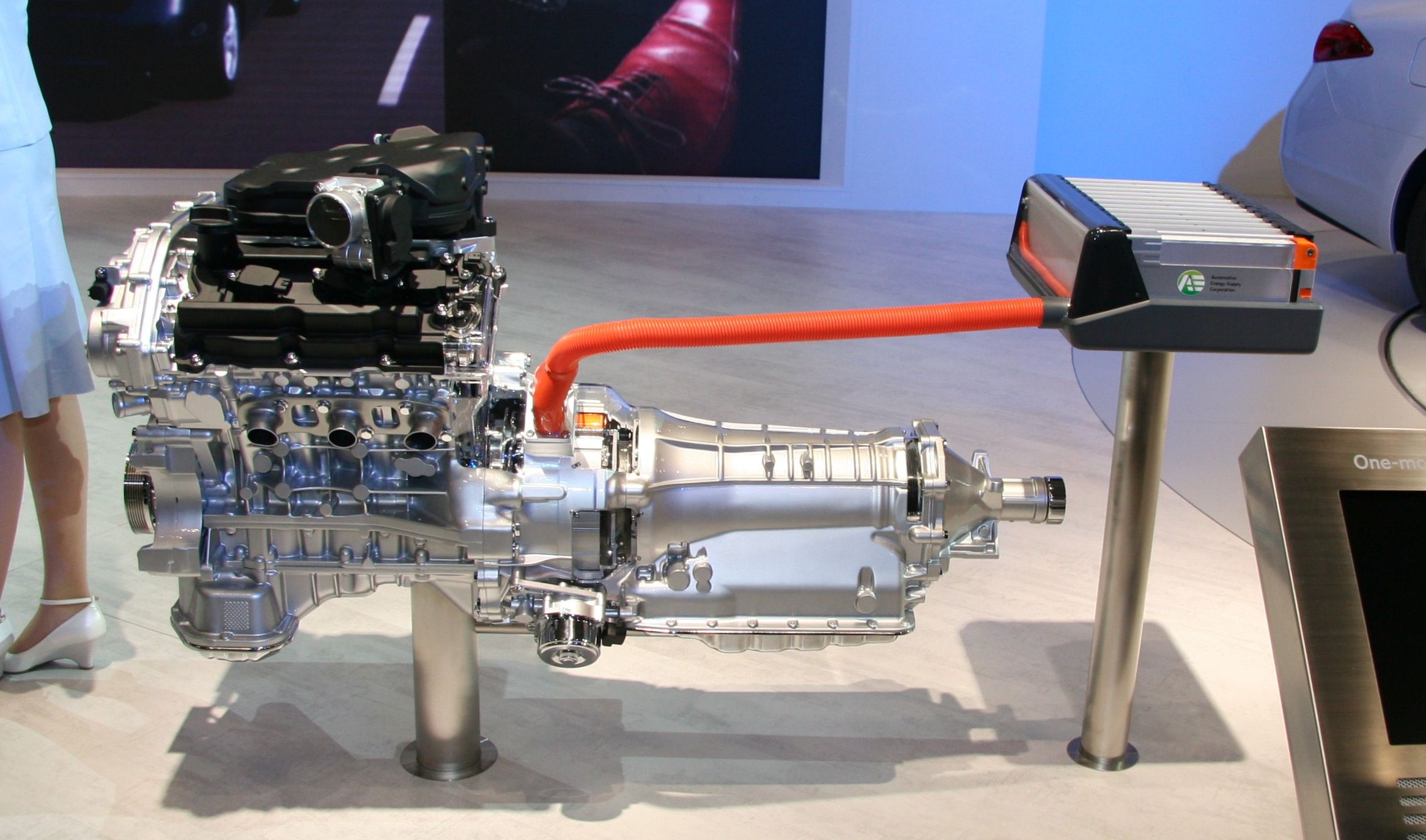
Nissan Fuga & Infiniti M Hybrid Powertrain

The hybrid includes one electric motor and two clutches to allow the 3.5L V6 (302 hp (225 kW) and 258 lb⋅ft (350 N⋅m)) gas engine and electric motor to drive the rear wheels simultaneously. The lithium-ion battery pack comes from the Infiniti Essence. The VQ35HR 3.5 L V6 Hybrid utilizes the Atkinson cycle. The electric motor, installed in parallel between the engine and the transmission, produces 68 PS (50 kW; 67 bhp) from 1.3kWh lithium-ion batteries that are expected to have a service life of 10 years. The batteries are installed upright behind the rear seats. The main sacrifices are that the luggage compartment space is reduced, the hybrid's rear seats are fixed in place and cannot fold down, and all-wheel drive is not available. One benefit of the battery placement though, is that it leaves the hybrid with a 51/49 front to rear weight distribution.

The combined power output of the M35H's hybrid power-train is 360 hp (268 kW; 365 PS) at 6500 rpm, and an estimated 391 lb⋅ft (530 N⋅m) of torque at 2000 rpm.

Reviewers have considered the 2012 Infiniti M35h, along with the 2011 Porsche Panamera S Hybrid which also debuted in the same calendar year, as among the best executed hybrid performance luxury cars. The M35h and Panamera S Hybrid were among the first hybrid gasoline-electric vehicles with an automatic transmission to return superior fuel economy figures while retaining the acceleration and handling characteristics of their gasoline-only counterparts. The 2007 Lexus GS450h utilized an e-CVT, improving efficiency at the cost of conventional driving dynamics. On the other hand, 2010 BMW ActiveHybrid 7 had a conventional automatic transmission but did not feature significantly improved fuel economy over its gasoline counterpart. The M35h's fuel economy is superior to the M37, and it is almost as fast as the M56 while providing a more balanced, near 50/50, front/rear weight distribution.

On August 23, 2011, the Infiniti M35h set an official Guinness world record for the world's fastest accelerating production full hybrid. The feat took place at the United Kingdom's Santa Pod Raceway, where CAR magazine journalist Tim Pollard drove the vehicle down the quarter-mile dragstrip in 13.896 seconds. The M35h averaged 13.9031 seconds for all runs, reaching speeds over 100 mph (160 km/h). Guinness adjudicators were present to witness the run and certify the record. The official claimed 0–100 km/h (62 mph) time for the Infiniti M35h is 5.5 seconds.

=== M30d (Diesel version) (2010–2014) ===
In 2010, at the Geneva Motor Show, the Infiniti M was introduced with a diesel engine for the first time. It was sold across Europe starting in September 2010. The V9X diesel engine produces 240 hp (179 kW) and 406 lb⋅ft (550 N⋅m) of torque at 2,500 rpm. In western Europe, this V6 performance diesel was offered as a high performance option in lieu of the M56 V8. The M30d was not sold in the US or Canada.

== Discontinuation ==
In 2019, Nissan confirmed that the Infiniti Q70, Q70L, Q30, and QX30 models would be discontinued after model year 2019 due to poor sales and a buyer shift in the United States, Canada, and Mexico to crossovers and SUVs instead of sedans, hatchbacks, wagons, convertibles, and coupes. Another reason for the discontinuation was Nissan's plans to withdraw the Infiniti brand from the Australian, New Zealand, South Korean, Hong Kong, Macau, Vietnamese, Indonesian, Malaysian, Singaporean, and West European markets by the end of 2020, with Nissan already withdrawing the Infiniti brand from the South African market in 2017 due to losses and poor sales. Nissan has no plans of abandoning sedans entirely and plans on possibly introducing an Infiniti EV vehicle in 2021 for the 2022 model year based from QS Inspiration concept.

== Awards and recognition ==
- 2010 Ward's Auto Interior of the Year
- 2011 Popular Mechanics Automotive Excellence Award- "Top 10 Cars of 2011" (Top Luxury Pick).
- 2011 Infiniti M received Insurance Institute for Highway Safety Top Safety Pick.
- 2011 Infiniti M35h sets official Guinness record for world's fastest production hybrid (certified by the 2013 Guinness Book of Records edition)

== Sales by calendar year ==
Year	U.S. Sales	Canada Sales
2002	1,010	n/a
2003	4,755	n/a
2004	2,090	31
2005	24,000	1,111
2006	25,658	1,083
2007	21,884	550
2008	15,618	410
2009	8,501	217
2010	14,618	550
2011	10,818	408
2012	9,130	320
2013	5,283	249
2014	5,034	128
2015	8,449	217
2016	5,872	156
2017	5,772	66

== See also ==
- Infiniti
