= Electric vehicle warning sounds =

Safety feature

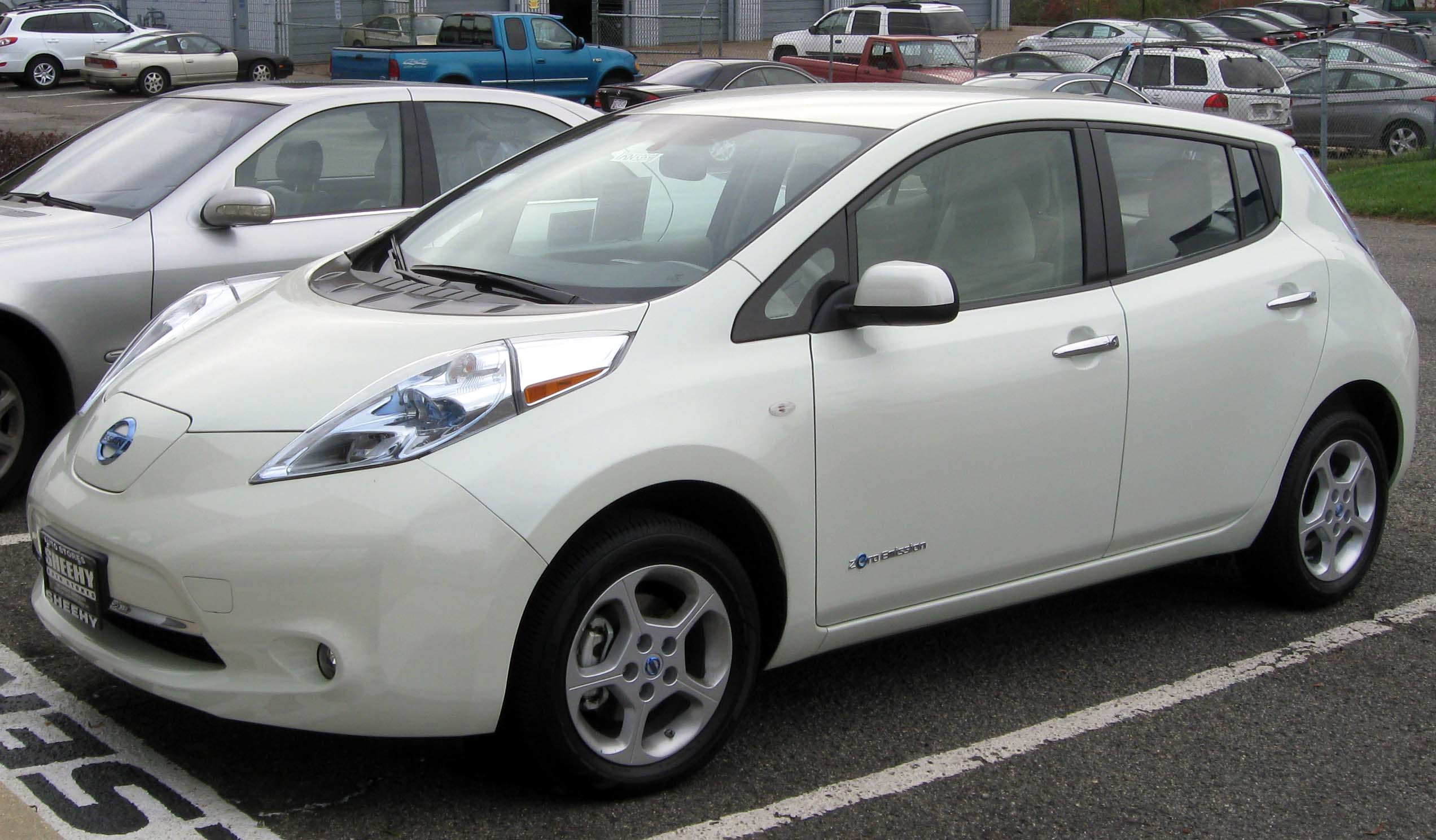
The 2011 Nissan Leaf was the first electric car equipped with Nissan's Vehicle Sound for Pedestrians called 'Canto'.

Electric vehicle warning sounds are sounds designed to alert pedestrians to the presence of electric drive vehicles such as hybrid electric vehicles (HEVs), plug-in hybrid electric vehicles (PHEVs), and battery electric vehicles (BEVs) travelling at low speeds. Warning sound devices were deemed necessary by some government regulators because vehicles operating in all-electric mode produce less noise than traditional combustion engine vehicles and can make it difficult for pedestrians and cyclists to be aware of their presence. This is a particular problem for those with visual impairments. Warning sounds may be activated by the driver (similar to a horn) or turn on automatically at low speeds. These sounds vary from clearly artificial (such as beeps and chimes) to those that mimic engine sounds or tires rolling over gravel.

Japan issued guidelines for such warning devices in January 2010, and the US approved legislation in December 2010. The US National Highway Traffic Safety Administration issued its final ruling in February 2018. Their ruling requires vehicles to emit warning sounds at speeds below 18.6 mph (30 km/h), with full compliance by September 2020 and 50% of "quiet" vehicles compliant by September 2019. In April 2014, the European Parliament approved legislation that requires the mandatory use of an acoustic vehicle alerting system (AVAS). Manufacturers must install an AVAS in four-wheeled electric and hybrid electric vehicles that are approved from July 1, 2019, and in all new quiet electric and hybrid vehicles registered from July 2021. The vehicle must make a continuous noise level of at least 56 dBA (within 7 feet or 2 metres) if the car is going 12 mph (20 km/h) or slower, and a maximum of 75 dBA.

Several automakers have developed electric warning sound devices, and since December 2011 advanced technology cars available in the market with manually activated electric warning sounds include the Nissan Leaf, Chevrolet Volt, Honda FCX Clarity, Nissan Fuga Hybrid/Infiniti M35, Hyundai Sonata Hybrid, and the Toyota Prius (Japan only). Models equipped with automatically activated systems include the 2014 BMW i3 (option not available in the US), 2012 model year Toyota Camry Hybrid, 2012 Lexus CT200h, all EV versions of the Honda Fit, and all Prius family cars recently introduced in the United States, including the standard 2012 model year Prius, the Toyota Prius v, Prius c and the Toyota Prius Plug-in Hybrid. The 2013 Smart electric drive, optionally, comes with automatically activated sounds in the US and Japan and manually activated in Europe.

== Background ==
As a result of increased sales of full electric vehicle and hybrid electric vehicles in several countries, some members of the blind community have raised concerns about the reduced noise when these vehicles operate in all-electric mode, since they rely on the sound of combustion engines as an aid when crossing streets and consider quiet hybrids a potential hazard. Although a 2009 study found no statistically significant difference in pedestrian crashes involving quiet hybrid vehicles when compared to noisier vehicles when both types of vehicles were travelling in a straight line, it found a 2x increase of pedestrian crashes involving hybrid vehicles when reversing, parking, and similar slow maneuvers.

This problem is not exclusive to electric vehicles. In 2007, research at the Technical University of Munich showed that ordinary vehicles in background noise are often detected too late for safe accident avoidance. The researchers measured the distance at which vehicles approaching pedestrians became audible with minimal background noise. These distances were then compared to the stopping distances of the respective cars, and an algorithm was proposed to estimate them based on auditory masking.

Research conducted at the University of California, Riverside in 2008 found that hybrid cars are so quiet when operating in electric mode (EV mode) that they may pose a risk to pedestrians and cyclists, especially the blind, children and the elderly, as they may have only one or two seconds, depending on the context, to audibly detect the location of approaching hybrid cars when the vehicles operate at very slow speeds. This research project was funded by the National Federation of the Blind.

The experiment consisted of making audio recordings of a Toyota Prius and combustion engine Honda Accord approaching from two directions at 5 miles per hour (8.0 km/h) to ensure that the hybrid car operated only with its electric motor. Then, test subjects in a laboratory listened to the recordings and indicated when they could hear from which direction the cars approached. Subjects could locate the hum of the internal combustion engine car at 36 feet (11 m) away but could not identify the hybrid running in electric mode until it came within 11 feet (3.4 m), leaving just under two seconds to react before the vehicle reached their position. In a second trial, the background sounds of two quietly idling combustion engine cars were added to the recordings to simulate the noise of a parking lot. Under this condition, the hybrid needed to be 74 percent closer than the conventional car before the subjects could hear from which direction the cars approached. Subjects could correctly judge the approach of the combustion car when it was about 28 feet (8.5 m) away. This means that under more realistic environmental noise, a pedestrian would not detect the hybrid's approach until it was one second away.

A separate 2008 study from Western Michigan University found that hybrids and conventional vehicles are equally safe when travelling more than about 20 miles per hour (32 km/h), because tire and wind noise generate most of the audible cues at those speeds. Hybrid cars were also tested safe when moving off at traffic lights, and it was found that under this condition they do not pose a risk to pedestrians. All Prius models used in the study engaged their internal combustion engines when accelerating from a standstill and produced enough noise to be detected.

A 2009 study conducted by the US National Highway Traffic Safety Administration found that crashes involving pedestrians and bicyclists have higher incidence rates for hybrid electric vehicles than internal combustion engine (ICE) vehicles in low-speed vehicle maneuvers such as reversing or leaving a parking zone. These accidents commonly occurred in zones with low-speed limits, during daytime, and in clear weather. The study found that a HEV was twice as likely to be involved in a pedestrian crash than was a conventional ICE vehicle when a vehicle is slowing or stopping, backing up, or entering or leaving a parking space. Manoeuvres likely to occur at very low speeds, where the difference in sound levels between hybrid and ICE vehicle is greatest, were grouped into a single category. Also, the study found that the incidence rate of pedestrian crashes in scenarios when vehicles make a turn was significantly higher for HEVs when compared to ICE vehicles. Similarly, The NHTSA study also concluded that the incidence rate of bicyclist crashes involving HEVs for the same kind of manoeuvres was significantly higher when compared to conventional vehicles.

In September 2010, Volvo Cars and Vattenfall, a Swedish energy company, issued a report regarding the results of the first phase of the Volvo V70 Plug-in Hybrid demonstration program. Among other findings, before the trial, drivers in the field test were concerned that the quietness of the electric-drive vehicle made them a danger to pedestrians and cyclists. After the test, several of them changed their opinion and said that this issue was less of a problem than they expected. Nevertheless, some test drivers said they experienced incidents of not being noticed, while others said they had taken extra care in their driving with regard to this issue.

== Regulations ==
Since 2009 the Japanese government, the US Congress and the European Commission have been exploring legislation to establish a minimum level of sound for plug-in electric and hybrid electric vehicles when operating in electric mode, so that blind people and other pedestrians and cyclists can hear them coming and detect from which direction they are approaching. Tests have shown that vehicles operating in electric mode can be particularly hard to hear below 30 km/h (20 mph).

=== European Union ===
In 2011, the European Commission drafted a guideline for acoustic vehicle alerting systems (AVAS). The goal is to present recommendations to manufacturers for a system to be installed in vehicles to provide an audible signal to pedestrians and vulnerable road users. This interim guideline is intended to provide guidance until the completion of ongoing research activities and the development of globally harmonized device performance specifications. The guidelines are intended for hybrid electric and pure electric highway-capable vehicles. The guideline recommends that the AVAS should automatically generate a continuous sound in the minimum range of vehicle speed from start-up to approximately 12 mph (20 km/h) and during reversing, if applicable for that vehicle category, and lists the types of sounds that are not acceptable. It also states that the AVAS may have a pause switch to stop its operation temporarily.

On 6 February 2013, the European Parliament approved a draft law to tighten noise limits for cars to protect public health, and also to add alerting sounds to ensure the audibility of hybrid and electric vehicles to improve the safety of vulnerable road users in urban areas, such as blind, visually and auditorily challenged pedestrians, cyclists and children. The draft legislation states a number of tests, standards, and measures that must first be developed for AVAS to be compulsory in the future. Now an agreement has to be negotiated with European Union countries. The approved amendment establishes that "the sound to be generated by the AVAS should be a continuous sound that provides information to the pedestrians and vulnerable road users of a vehicle in operation. The sound should be easily indicative of vehicle behavior and should sound similar to the sound of a vehicle of the same category equipped with an internal combustion engine." In April 2014, the European Parliament approved legislation (Regulation (EU) No 540/2014) requiring the acoustic vehicle alerting systems, which is mandatory for all new electric and hybrid electric vehicles. The new rule established a transitional period of 5 years after publication of the final approval of the April 2014 proposal to comply with the regulation.

=== Japan ===
Beginning in July 2009, the Japanese government began assessing possible countermeasures through the Committee for the Consideration of Countermeasures Regarding Quiet Hybrid and Other Vehicles, and in January 2010, the Ministry of Land, Infrastructure, Transport and Tourism issued guidelines for hybrid and other near-silent vehicles.

=== China ===
Beginning in December 2018, the Chinese government explored guidelines regarding an acoustic vehicle alerting system of electric vehicles running at low speed and implemented them in September 2019.

=== United Kingdom ===
The Department for Transport (DfT) commissioned research to gather statistics on accidents involving electric vehicles with pedestrians who are blind or vision impaired to determine whether the perceived accident risk is real and whether electric and hybrid cars are more difficult to detect audibly than conventional internal combustion engine vehicles. The DfT goal was to use the findings to establish what sort of sound should be fitted to electric vehicles.

The research was conducted by the Transport Research Laboratory, and the findings were published in 2011. The study found little correlation between the rate of accidents with pedestrians and noise level for the majority of vehicles. In addition, the analysis found no evidence of a pattern in accident rate when only considering those accidents occurring on 30 mph (48 km/h) or slower roads, or where the pedestrian was disabled. A previous study did not find an increased pedestrian accident rate for electric and hybrid vehicles with respect to their conventional counterparts, which raised the question as to whether added sound is necessarily required. The study also noted that some modern conventional cars are as quiet as their electric counterparts, even at low speeds.

UK organization The Guide Dogs for the Blind Association lobbied members of the European Parliament to vote in favor of legislation to make the installation of artificial sound generators mandatory on quiet electric and hybrid vehicles.

=== United States ===
The Pedestrian Safety Enhancement Act of 2010 was approved by the US Senate by unanimous consent on December 9, 2010, and passed by the House of Representatives by 379 to 30 on December 16, 2010. The act does not stipulate a specific speed for the simulated noise but requires the US Department of Transportation to study and establish a motor vehicle safety standard that would set requirements for an alert sound that allows blind and other pedestrians to reasonably detect a nearby electric or hybrid vehicle, and the ruling must be finalized within eighteen months. The bill was signed into law by President Barack Obama on January 4, 2011.

A proposed rule was published for comment by the National Highway Traffic Safety Administration (NHTSA) in January 2013. It would require hybrids and electric vehicles travelling at less than 18.6 mph (30 km/h) to emit warning sounds that pedestrians must be able to hear over background noises. The agency selected 30 km/h as the limit because, according to NHTSA measurements, this is the speed at which the sound levels of the hybrid and electric vehicles are approximately equivalent to the sound levels produced by similar internal combustion vehicles. According to the NHTSA proposal, car manufacturers would be able to pick the sounds the vehicles make from a range of choices, and similar vehicles would have to make the same sounds. The rules were scheduled to go into effect in September 2014. The NHTSA estimates that the new warning noises would prevent 2,800 pedestrian and cyclist injuries during the life of each model year electric and hybrid vehicle.

In February 2013, the Association of Global Automakers and the Alliance of Automobile Manufacturers, which submitted a joint comment to the NHTSA, announced their support to the rule, but asked the NHTSA to find a noise level that effectively alerts pedestrians without being excessively loud to others inside and outside of the vehicle. They also commented that the rule is too complicated, unnecessarily prescriptive, and it will cost more than necessary. Some automakers also said there is no need for electric-drive vehicles to play sounds while not in motion, "since it is not clear that it helps pedestrians to hear cars that are stopped in traffic or parked." In addition, the vehicle manufacturers requested the NHTSA to make the new sound system required by 2018 instead of 2014.

In January 2015, the NHTSA rescheduled the date for a final ruling to the end of 2015. Since the regulation comes into force three years after being rendered as a final rule, compliance was delayed to 2018. In November 2015, the NHTSA rescheduled one more time because additional coordination was necessary. A final ruling was delayed at least until mid-March 2016. After several additional delays, the National Highway Traffic Safety Administration issued its final ruling in February 2018. It requires hybrids and electric vehicles travelling at less than 18.6 mph (30 km/h) to emit warning sounds that pedestrians must be able to hear over background noises. The regulation requires full compliance in September 2020, but 50% of "quiet" vehicles must have the warning sounds by September 2019. The NHTSA provides specific instructions on how to perform a laboratory test to ensure that a vehicle meets requirements.

== Specific systems ==
=== Enhanced Vehicle Acoustics ===
Enhanced Vehicle Acoustics (EVA), a company based in Silicon Valley, California and founded by two Stanford students with the help of seed money from the National Federation of the Blind, developed an after market technology called "Vehicular Operations Sound Emitting Systems" (VOSES). The device makes hybrid electric vehicles sound more like conventional internal combustion engine cars when the vehicle goes into the silent electric mode (EV mode), but at a fraction of the sound level of most vehicles. At speeds higher than between 20 and 25 miles per hour (32 and 40 km/h) the sound system shuts off. The system also shuts off when the hybrid combustion engine is active.

VOSES uses miniature, all-weather audio speakers that are placed on the hybrid's wheel wells and emit specific sounds based on the direction the car is moving in order to minimize noise pollution and to maximize acoustic information for pedestrians. If the car is moving forward, the sounds are only projected in the forward direction; and if the car is turning left or right, the sound changes on the left or right appropriately. The company argues that "chirps, beeps and alarms are more distracting than useful", and that the best sounds for alerting pedestrians are car-like, such as "the soft purr of an engine or the slow roll of tires across pavement." One of the EVA's external sound systems was designed specifically for the Toyota Prius.

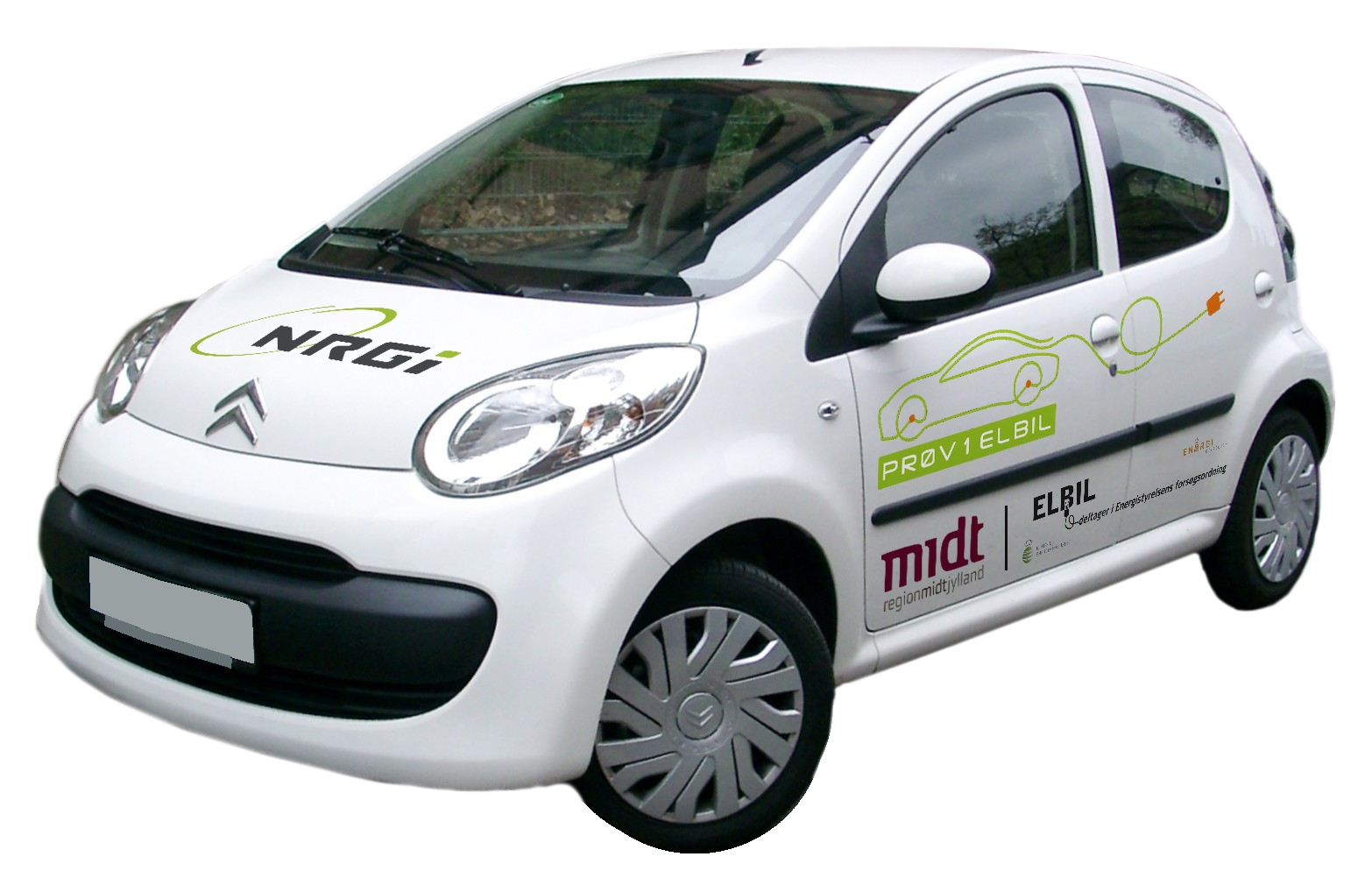
The Electric Citroën C1 with ECTunes external sound system.

=== ECTunes ===
ECTunes is developing a system that uses directional sound equipment to emit noise when and where it is needed. According to the company, its technology sends audible signals only in the direction of travel, thus allowing the vehicle to be heard by those who may be in the car's path, without disturbing others with unwelcome noise. Insero Horsens, a Danish venture company, has provided a significant investment to help ECTunes fully develop its technology.

The ECTunes system, and most others so far disclosed, use a control box with software, digital amplifiers, and weather-friendly external speakers. ECTunes' system connects to the car and reads speed and acceleration, shutting down when the car reaches Cross-over speed as set by existing regulation as well as regulation under development such as Quiet Road Transport Vehicles (QRTV), at which point the tires and wind are making noise of their own. The company is currently selling products to OEMs, mainly small series production, and to the after market, and also has a new mass production unit in prototype stage The company ceased operations in 2016.

=== Fisker Automotive ===
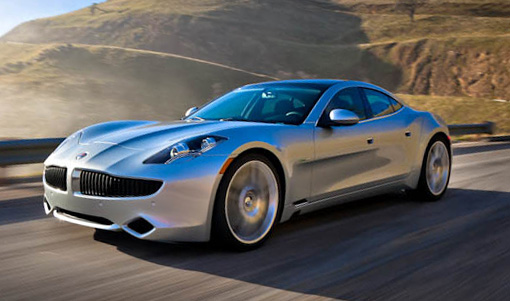
The Fisker Karma has an automatic warning sound-generator.

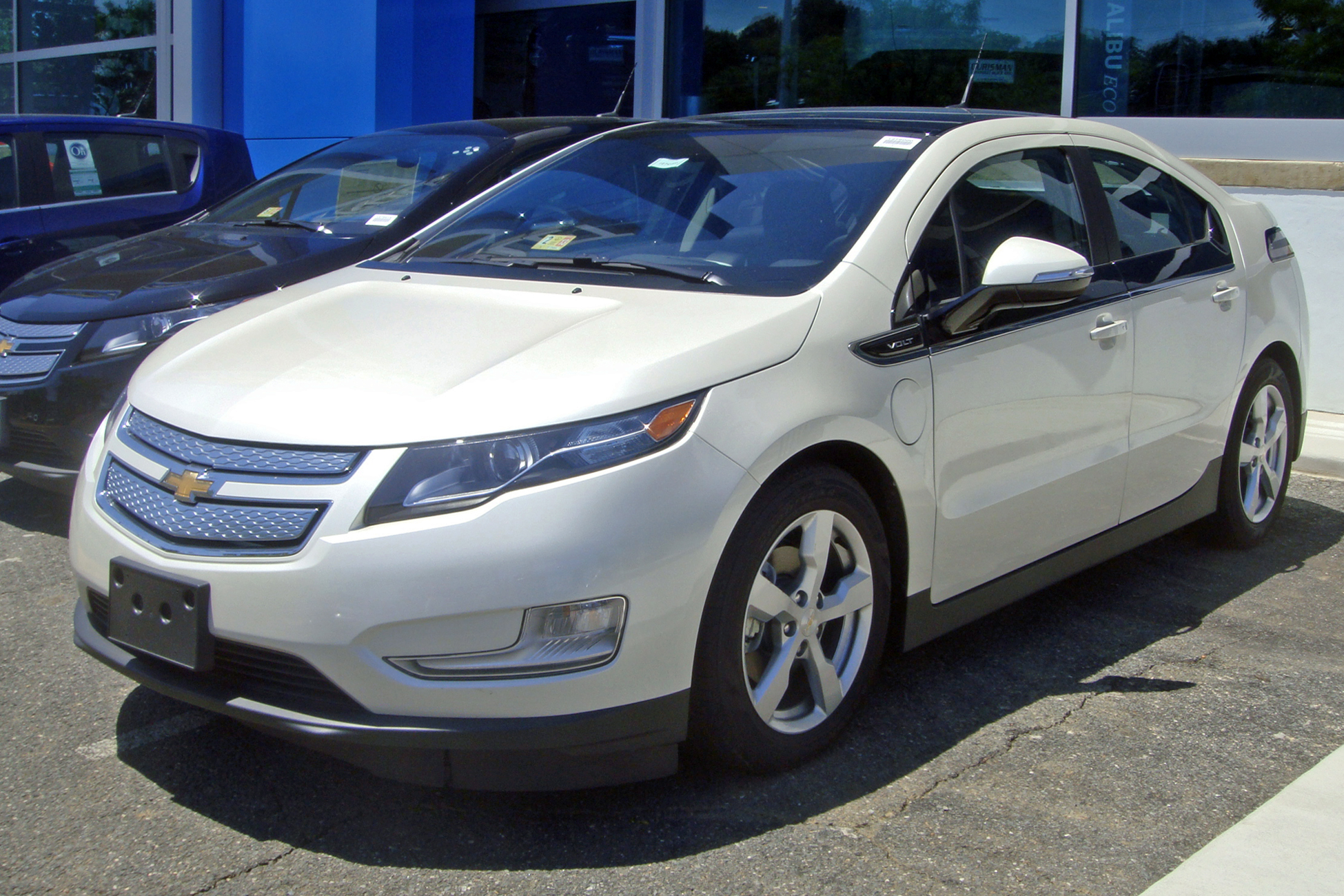
The 2011 Chevrolet Volt includes a manually activated warning sound.

Fisker Automotive developed a sound-generator that was incorporated in its Fisker Karma luxury plug-in hybrid electric vehicle, released in 2011. According to the car manufacturer, the sound is designed to both alert pedestrians and enhance the driver experience, and the warning noise will be emitted automatically. The Fisker Karma emits a sound through a pair of external speakers embedded in the bumper. According to a company spokesman the sound is a mix between a "Formula One car and a starship".

The developing process took between nine months and a year, and three sound companies sent in synthesised WAV file samples that were evaluated by Fisker employees and executives. The prospective sounds were studied in an audio chamber to allow engineers to evaluate the sounds without other noise interfering. After testing the candidate sounds in different locations relative to the vehicle, Fisker fine-tuned the final sound with its own equipment. The warning sound is activated when the car is travelling at less than 25 mph (40 km/h).

=== Ford ===
The 2012 Ford Focus Electric was planned to include warning sounds for pedestrians. Ford Motor Company developed four alternative sounds, and in June 2011 involved the electric car fans by asking them to pick their favorite from the four potential warning sounds through the Focus Electric Facebook page. However, ultimately Ford decided to hold off including warning sounds unless federal legislation required it, and no such system was implemented on the production vehicle.

=== General Motors ===
General Motors' first commercially available plug-in hybrid electric vehicle, the Chevrolet Volt, introduced in December 2010, includes warning sounds for pedestrians. GM's system is called Pedestrian-Friendly Alert System and it is manually activated by the driver. The automaker conducted a test with a group of the visually challenged at Milford Proving Grounds in order to evaluate the audible warning systems on the Volt when a pedestrian is in the car's proximity. The system uses the car's horn to emit a series of warning chirps, like a low tone of a horn, enough to provide an alert but not to startle. According to GM engineers, the biggest challenge is "developing an active system that can distinguish a pedestrian from another vehicle"; otherwise, the sound will go off frequently, producing noise pollution instead.

=== Hyundai ===
Hyundai developed a warning noise called the Virtual Engine Sound System (VESS). The system, which was introduced in September 2010 on its test fleet of BlueOn electric hatchbacks, provides synthetic audio feedback mimicking the sound of an idling internal combustion engine.

The 2011 Hyundai Sonata Hybrid is the first mass production car manufactured by Hyundai to include the warning sound system. In 2010 the car manufacturer decided to have a button on the Sonata Hybrid's instrument panel to turn the VESS on and off, but after the enactment of the Pedestrian Safety Enhancement Act of 2010, signed into law by President Obama in early 2011, and learning that the US National Highway Traffic Safety Administration would not allow such switches to avoid the noise device to be turned off, Hyundai decided not to install the button, and the first Sonata Hybrids destined for the US market had to be altered to remove the switch.

=== Kia ===
Kia Niro HEV models sold in the US and UK in 2020/21 have been highly criticised by owners for the loud and antisocial reversing alert sounds, which can be heard from many 100s of feet away and yet are emitted from the front of the car.

=== Lotus Engineering ===
Lotus Engineering, a consultancy group of British sports car manufacturer Lotus Cars, partnered in 2009 with Harman Becker, a producer of audio systems, to develop and commercialise a synthetic automotive audio systems. Lotus has worked on a number of hybrid and electric vehicles and its engineers thought they would be safer if these vehicles made a noise while moving around the factory. Originally developed to cancel out intrusive noises inside a car, the noise-cancelling system was adapted so that it could also simulate engine sounds that change with speed and use of the throttle, providing audible "feedback" to drivers of vehicles with a silent engine. At the same time, and through the addition of external speakers, the sound system allows pedestrians to hear the noise too, but optionally there can be a different sound within the car from the one that is emitted for the outside. Lotus used a Toyota Prius to demonstrate the device but did not indicate if it intended to bring this technology to market.

Lotus' synthetic sound system was incorporated in the Lotus Evora 414E Hybrid, a concept plug-in hybrid unveiled at the 2010 Geneva Motor Show. The system, called HALOsonic Internal and External Electronic Sound Synthesis, is a suite of noise solutions that uses patented technologies from Lotus and Harman International. The audio system generates engine sounds inside the vehicle through the audio system. The system also generates the external sound through speakers mounted at the front and rear to provide a warning to increase pedestrian safety. The system comes with four driver-selectable engine sounds, two of which have been designed to have characteristics of a multi-cylinder conventional V6 and V12 engine.

=== Nissan ===
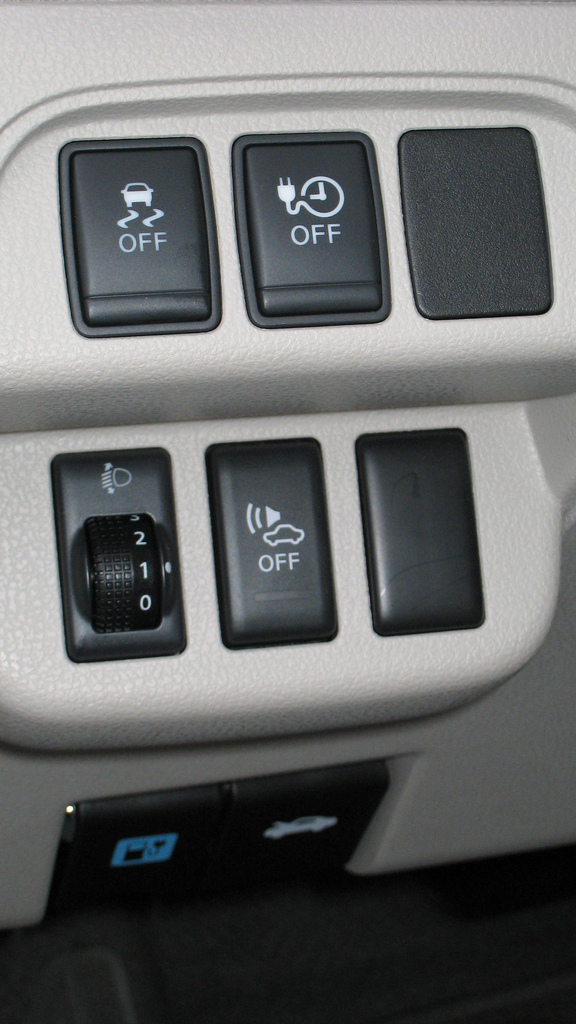
2011 Nissan Leaf equipped with warning sound pause switch.

Vehicle Sound for Pedestrians (VSP) is a Nissan-developed warning sound system in electric vehicles. The Nissan Leaf was the first car manufactured by Nissan to include VSP, and the electric car includes one sound for forward motion and another for reverse. The VSP was also used in the Nissan Fuga hybrid launched in 2011. The system developed makes a noise easy to hear for pedestrians to be aware of the vehicle approaching, but the warning sounds do not distract the car occupants inside. Nissan explained that during the development of the sound they studied behavioural research of the visually impaired and worked with cognitive and acoustic psychologists, including the National Federation of the Blind (NFB), the Detroit Institute of Ophthalmology, experts from the Vanderbilt University Medical Center and a Hollywood sound design studio.

Nissan's Vehicle Sound for Pedestrians is a sine-wave sound system that sweeps from 2.5 kHz at the high end to a low of 600 Hz, a range that is easily audible across age groups. Depending on the speed and whether the Leaf is accelerating or decelerating, the sound system will make sweeping, high-low sounds. For example, when the Leaf is started the sound will be louder, and when the car is in reverse, the system will generate an intermittent sound. The sound system ceases operation when the Nissan Leaf reaches 30 km/h (18.6 mph) and engages again as the car slows to under 25 kilometres per hour (16 mph). For the 2011 Leaf, the driver could turn off sounds temporarily through a switch inside the vehicle, but the system automatically reset to "On" at the next ignition cycle. The system is controlled through a computer and synthesizer in the dash panel, and the sound is delivered through a speaker in the front driver's side wheel well. Nissan said that there were six or seven finalist sounds, and that sound testing included driving cars emitting various sounds past testers standing on street corners, who indicated when they first heard the approaching car. Nissan removed the ability to disable the pedestrian alert between model year 2011 and 2012 in anticipation of the US ruling to be issued by the National Highway Traffic Safety Administration.

After Nissan's new sounds were publicised, the US National Federation of the Blind issued a statement saying that "while it was pleased that the alert existed, it was unhappy that the driver was able to turn it off." The NFB approves the Nissan Leaf's forward motion sound, but it said the forward noise should also be used for reversing because the "intermittent sound is not as effective as a continuous sound" and that the car should emit warning sounds when it is idling, not only when it's moving slowly. Nevertheless, their main complaint is that they don't think the driver should be able to switch the sound off.

The Leaf's electric warning sound had to be removed for cars delivered in the U.K., as the country's law mandates that any hazard warning sound must be capable of being disabled between 11:00 pm and 6:00 am, and the Leaf's audible warning system does not allow for such temporary deactivation. For the 2014 UK model of the car, the VSP system is enabled by default, though a button on the dash permits drivers to disable the system until the next time the car is switched on.

=== Tesla ===
Tesla, Inc. introduced a Pedestrian Warning System feature in September 2019 that emits warning sounds when the vehicle is traveling below 19mph/32km/h. In 2021, Tesla announced plans to retrofit the system onto select older Model 3 and Model Y vehicles from 2019. The feature is currently available on all Tesla models: Tesla Model S, Tesla Model 3, Tesla Model X, and Tesla Model Y.

=== Toyota ===
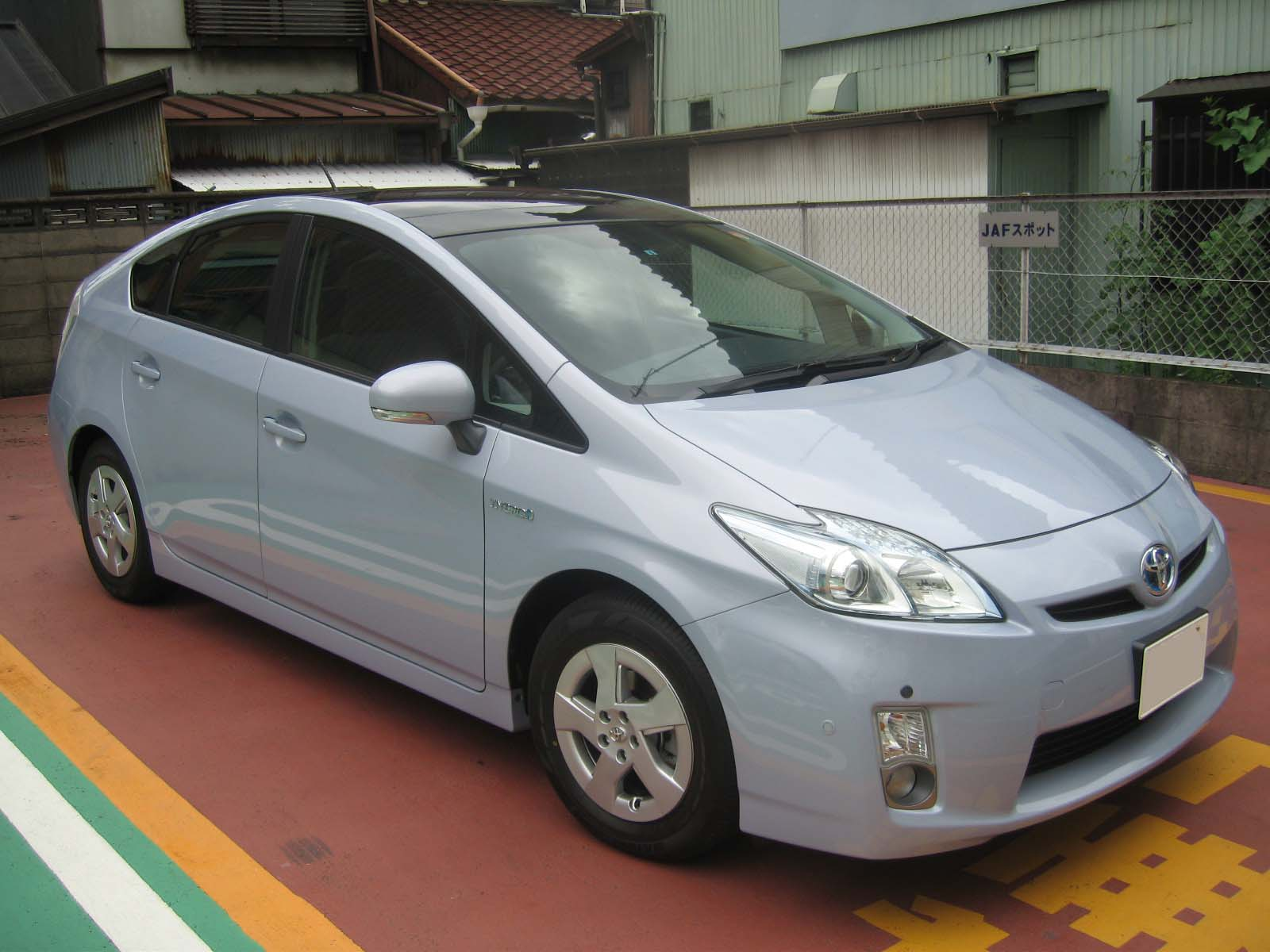
Since August 2010, a warning device for retrofitting the Toyota Prius is available for Japanese consumers.

Toyota Motor Company teamed up with Fujitsu Ten to develop an automatic warning system for hybrids and electric vehicles to alert pedestrians when the car is propelled by its electric motor. The companies also studied the development of a system that would change the alarm's tune and volume with the assistance of an obstacle-detection radar.

In August 2010 Toyota began sales of an onboard device designed to automatically emit a synthesised sound of an electric motor when the Prius is operating as an electric vehicle at speeds up to approximately 25 kilometres per hour (16 mph). The device will be available in Japan through authorised Toyota dealers and Toyota genuine parts & accessories distributors for retrofitting on the third-generation Prius at a price of ¥12,600 (~US$150) including the consumption tax. The alert sound rises and falls in pitch according to the vehicle's speed, thus helping indicate the vehicle's proximity and movement to nearby pedestrians. Toyota is planning to use other versions of the device for use in hybrid electric vehicles, plug-in hybrids, electric vehicles as well as fuel-cell hybrid vehicles planned for mass production. The device meets the 2010 government regulations issued for hybrid and other near-silent vehicles.

Toyota's Vehicle Proximity Notification System (VPNS) was introduced in the United States in all 2012 model year Prius family vehicles, including the Prius v, Prius Plug-in Hybrid and the standard Prius. The system is being introduced to comply with the Pedestrian Safety Enhancement Act of 2010.

=== Volkswagen ===
Volkswagen offers a so-called e-Sound module on its electric and hybrid vehicles such as the e-Up, e-Golf and the GTE hybrid range. It provides a pedestrian warning sound up to 30 km/h.

=== Other manufacturers ===
Think Global, a manufacturer of electric cars already in the market, is assessing this safety issue. Ford Motor Company is developing a system for emitting external sounds to future hybrids and electrics, including its Focus BEV, scheduled for 2011, and a next-generation hybrid and plug-in hybrid vehicle planned for 2012. Nancy Gioia, Ford's Director for Global Electrification commented that "car companies should consider standardising tones from future hybrids and electrics to avoid a cacophony of confusion on the streets."

== Criticism and controversy ==
Several anti-noise and electric car advocates have opposed the introduction of artificial sounds as warning for pedestrians, as they argue that the proposed system will only increase noise pollution. They also opposed US pending legislation that would require generated warning sounds with no off switch for the driver.

Robert S. Wall Emerson of Western Michigan University has argued that several high-end gasoline-powered luxury cars are already quieter than hybrids, and according to his most recent studies, hybrid SUVs were noisier than many internal-combustion vehicles. He concludes that pedestrian safety is not a hybrid issue but rather "a quiet car issue".

== Market availability ==
As of 1 January 2014, most of the hybrids and plug-in electric and hybrids sold in the US market make warning noises using a speaker system. Tesla Motors, Volkswagen and BMW do not currently include warning sounds in their electric-drive vehicles, as all of them decided to add artificial sounds only when required by regulation.

Summary of electric-drive cars launched/scheduled with electronic warning sound system incorporated
Vehicle	Powertrain type	Sound activation	Type of sound	Launch date	Markets
2011 Chevrolet Volt	Plug-in hybrid	Manual	Intermittent chirps	November 2010	US, Europe and Australia. Sound is activated by a button on the turn signal lever.
2011 Nissan Leaf	All-electric	Automatic with manual turn off	Forward: continuous Reverse: intermittent	December 2010	Japan, US, Canada, and several European countries. Activated while moving at less than 18.6 mph (30 km/h). Nissan removed the ability to disable the alert between model year 2011 and 2012.
2011 Nissan Fuga Hybrid /Infiniti M35	Hybrid electric	Automatic with manual turn off	Forward: continuous Reverse: intermittent	Late 2010/2011	Japan (2010) and US (2011 as 2012 Infiniti M Hybrid)
2011 Fisker Karma	Plug-in hybrid	Automatic	Continuous	July 2011	US and Europe. Activated when the car is travelling at less than 25 mph (40 km/h).
2011 Hyundai Sonata Hybrid	Hybrid electric	n.a.	n.a.	March 2011	US
2012 Bolloré Bluecar	All-electric	Automatic	Continuous	December 2011	France
2012 Toyota Camry Hybrid	Hybrid electric	Automatic	Continuous	August 2011	US
2012 Lexus CT200h	Hybrid electric	Automatic	Continuous	August 2011	US
2012 Toyota Prius v	Hybrid electric	Automatic	Continuous	October 2011	US; Activated when the car is travelling at less than 15 mph (24 km/h).
2012 Toyota Prius Plug-in Hybrid	Plug-in hybrid	Automatic	Continuous	February 2012	US; Activated when the car is travelling at less than 15 mph (24 km/h).
2012 Ford Focus Electric	All-electric	n.a.	n.a.	2012	US
2012 Toyota Prius	Hybrid electric	Automatic	Continuous	2012	US; Activated when the car is travelling at less than 15 mph (24 km/h).
2012 Toyota Prius c	Hybrid electric	Automatic	Continuous	March 2012	US; Activated when the car is travelling at less than 15 mph (24 km/h).
2012 Honda Fit EV	All-electric	Automatic	Continuous	July 2012	US and Japan. Activated while moving at less than 12 mph (19 km/h).
2013 Honda Accord Plug-in Hybrid	Plug-in hybrid	Automatic	Continuous	January 2013	United States; Activated while moving in all-electric mode at less than 12 mph (19 km/h).
2014 Honda Accord Hybrid	Hybrid electric	Automatic	Continuous	October 2013	United States; Activated while moving in all-electric mode at less than 12 mph (19 km/h).
2013 Smart electric drive	All-electric	Automatic and manual	Continuous	May 2013	Automatically activated in the US and Japan and manually activated in Europe.
2013 Fiat 500e	All-electric	Automatic	Continuous	July 2013	US Activated while moving at less than 22 mph (25 km/h).
2015 Kia Soul EV	All-electric	Automatic	Continuous	September; 2014	Global Activated while moving at less than 30 km/h (19 mph).
2016 Hyundai Ioniq Electric	All-electric	Automatic and manual	Continuous	September; 2016	Global Activated while moving at less than 30 km/h (19 mph).
2018 Honda Clarity Plug-In Hybrid	Plug-in hybrid	Automatic	Continuous	December; 2017	Canada, Japan, and United States. Can be manually deactivated in Canada, but not in the United States. Activated while moving in all-electric mode at less than 12 mph (19 km/h).

== See also ==
- Active sound design
- Advanced driver-assistance systems – Electronic systems that help a vehicle driver while driving or parking
- Back-up beeper – Audible alarm when a vehicle is reversing
- Red flag traffic laws – Historic automobile approach announcement laws
- Traffic psychology – Discipline of psychology
