= Toyota Prius (XW30) =

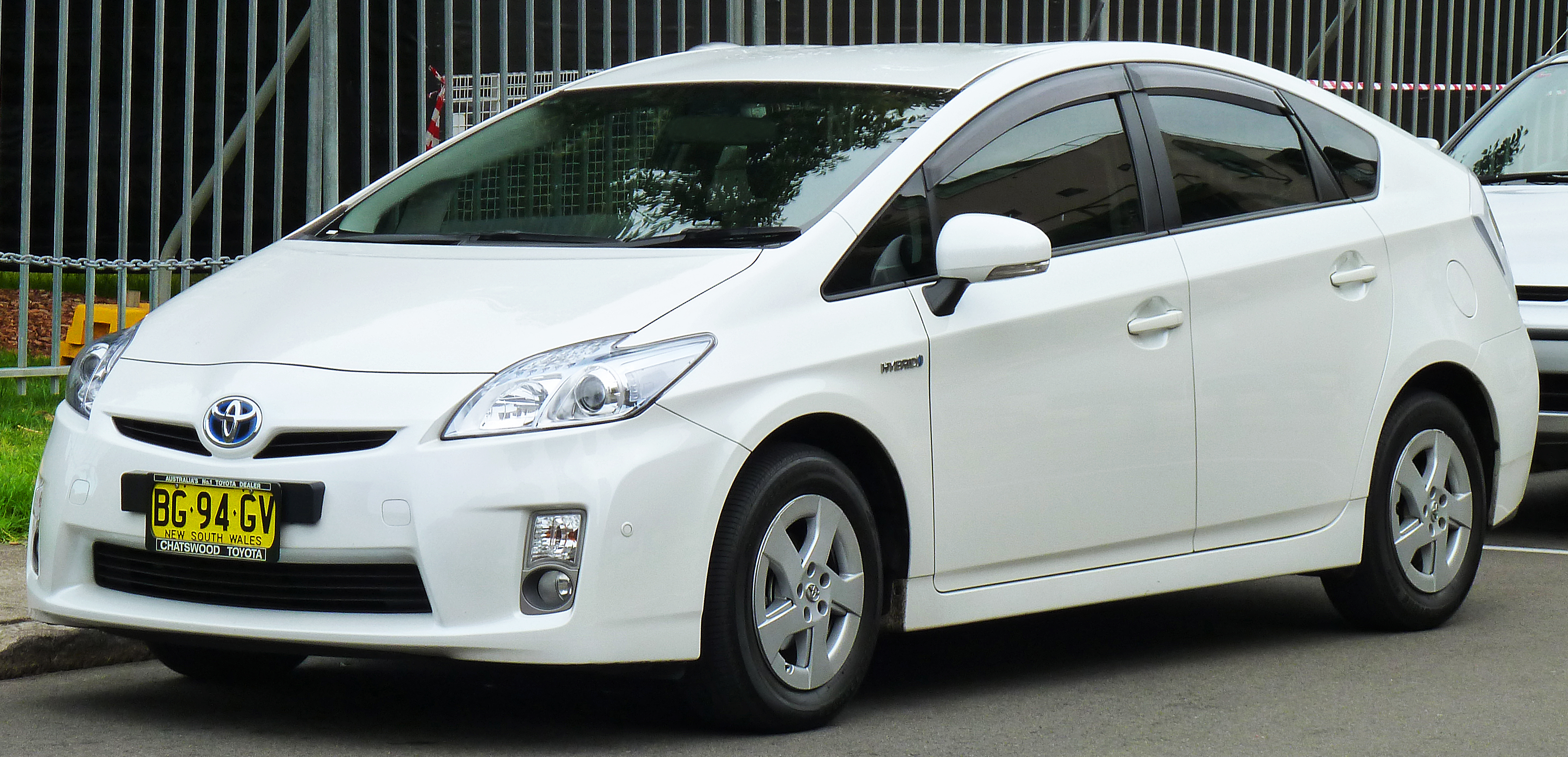
- 2009 Toyota Prius (ZVW30R; pre-facelift, Australia)

Overview
- Manufacturer: Toyota
- Production: March 2009 – 2016; December 2011 – 2015 (China)
- Model years: 2010–2015
- Assembly: Japan: Toyota, Aichi (Tsutsumi plant); Thailand: Chachoengsao (Gateway plant); China: Changchun, Jilin (SFTM)

Body and chassis
- Class: Compact car (C)
- Body style: 5-door fastback/liftback
- Layout: Front-engine, front-wheel-drive
- Platform: Toyota New MC platform
- Related: Toyota Prius Plug-in Hybrid (XW30); Toyota Prius V; Toyota Mirai (JPD10)

Powertrain
- Engine: Toyota Hybrid System; Gasoline engine: 1.8 L 2ZR-FXE I4 VVT-i (Atkinson cycle); Power: 73 kW (98 hp) at 5200 rpm; Torque: 142 N⋅m (105 lb⋅ft) at 4000 rpm; Electric Motors: Power: 60 kW (80 hp); Hybrid system total: 100 kW (134 hp)
- Transmission: 1-speed planetary gear
- Hybrid drivetrain: Power-split Hybrid
- Battery: 1.3 kWh Nickel-metal hydride

Dimensions
- Wheelbase: 2,700 mm (106.3 in)
- Length: 2010-2011: 4,460 mm (175.6 in); 2011–2015: 4,481 mm (176.4 in)
- Width: 1,745 mm (68.7 in)
- Height: 2010-2011: 1,480 mm (58.3 in); 2011–2015: 1,491 mm (58.7 in)
- Curb weight: 1,379 kg (3,040.2 lb)

Chronology
- Predecessor: Toyota Prius (XW20)
- Successor: Toyota Prius (XW50)

The third generation Toyota Prius debuted as a compact liftback manufactured and marketed by Toyota, having launched in 2009 for model year 2010 at the January 2009 North American International Auto Show. Internally designated as model XW30 and replacing the XW20 series, sales began in Japan on May 18, 2009.

Noted for its more aerodynamic bodywork and a claimed drag coefficient of Cd=0.25, an underbody rear fin helps stabilize the vehicle at higher speeds. The third generation is also noted as the first production engine without efficiency-robbing accessory drive belts.

Since its launch in 2009, global production reached approximately 1,688,000.

== Development ==
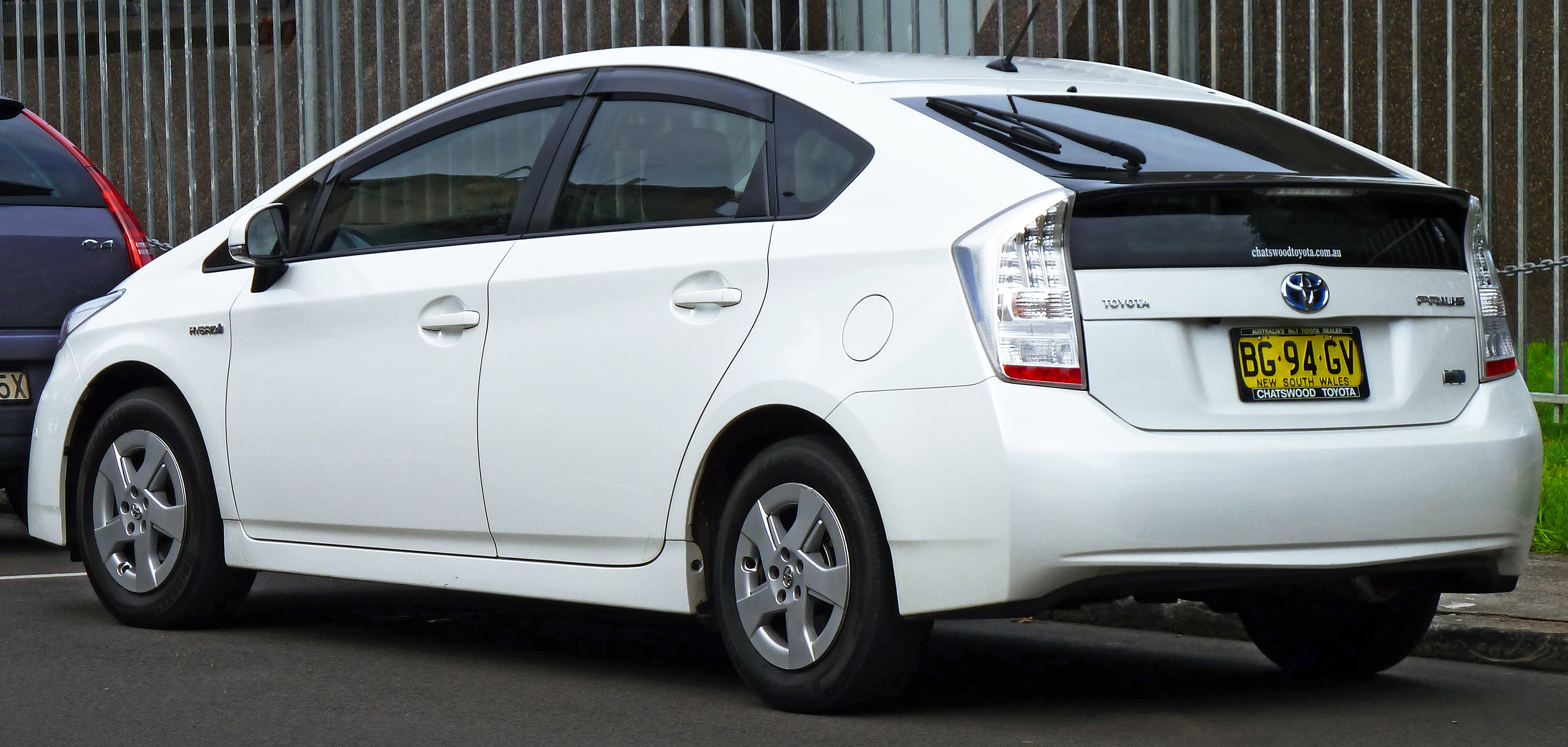
2009 Toyota Prius (ZVW30R; pre-facelift, Australia)

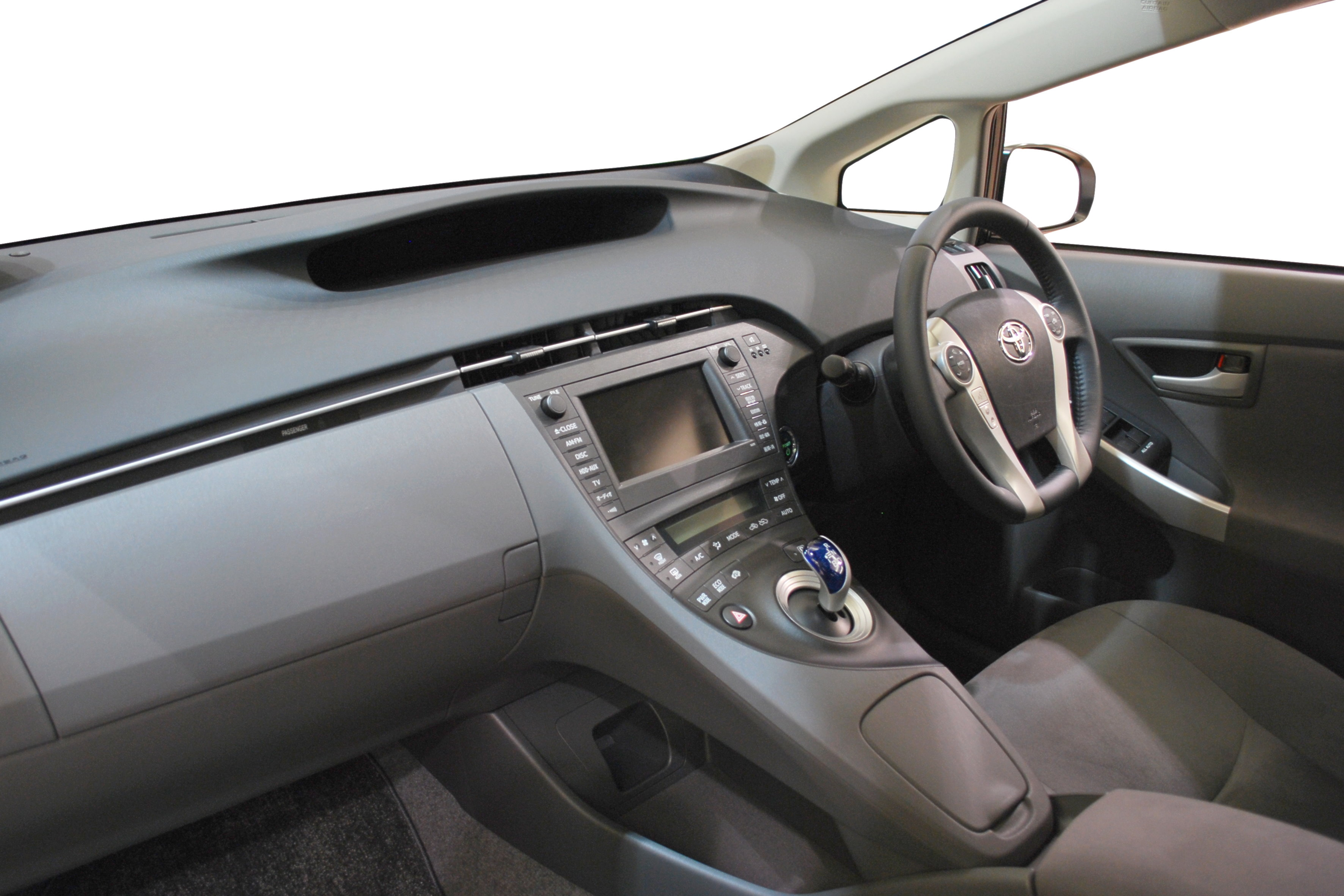
Interior

The powertrain concept largely carried over from the previous XW20 generation, with engine displacement increasing to 1.8 litres and the transaxle changing to the THS III. Disc brakes replaced the North American model's rear drum brakes.

For the Prius, Toyota used a range of plant-derived ecological bioplastics using wood- or grass-derived cellulose. The two principal crops are kenaf (a member of the hibiscus family and related to cotton and okra) and ramie, commonly known as China grass and one of the strongest natural fibres, similar to flax in absorbency and density. The use of plant-based eco-plastics coincided the United Nations' 2009 International Year of Natural Fibres.

In August 2010, Toyota began sales of an onboard sound device to mimic the sound of an electric motor when the Prius is operating in its most quiet mode, as an electric vehicle at speeds up to approximately 25 kilometres per hour (16 mph). The device became available in Japan for retrofitting on the third-generation Prius at a price of ¥12,600 (~US$150) including the consumption tax. The alert rises and falls in pitch according to the vehicle's speed, to convey the vehicle's proximity and movement to nearby pedestrians. The device met the Ministry of Land, Infrastructure, Transport and Tourism's guidelines issued in January 2010 for hybrid and other near-silent vehicles.

Toyota said it filed 1,000 patents during the development of the XW30 Prius.

== Powertrain ==
=== ZVW30 ===
The 1.8-liter four-cylinder gasoline engine (previously 1.5 liters) generates 73 kW; 99 PS (98 hp), and with the added power of the electric motor 20 kW; 27 PS (27 hp), total horsepower is 100 kW (134 hp) (previously 110 hp). The larger engine displacement allows for increased torque, reducing engine speeds (rpm), which increases fuel economy at highway speeds. With an electric water pump, the Prius engine is the first production engine that requires no accessory belts, which also further improves fuel economy. The electric motors and other components of the hybrid powertrain are also smaller and more efficient. Toyota estimates the new inverter, motor and transaxle are 20 percent lighter. It has a 1.3 kWh nickel-metal hydride (NiMH) battery.

=== ZVW35: plug-in version ===
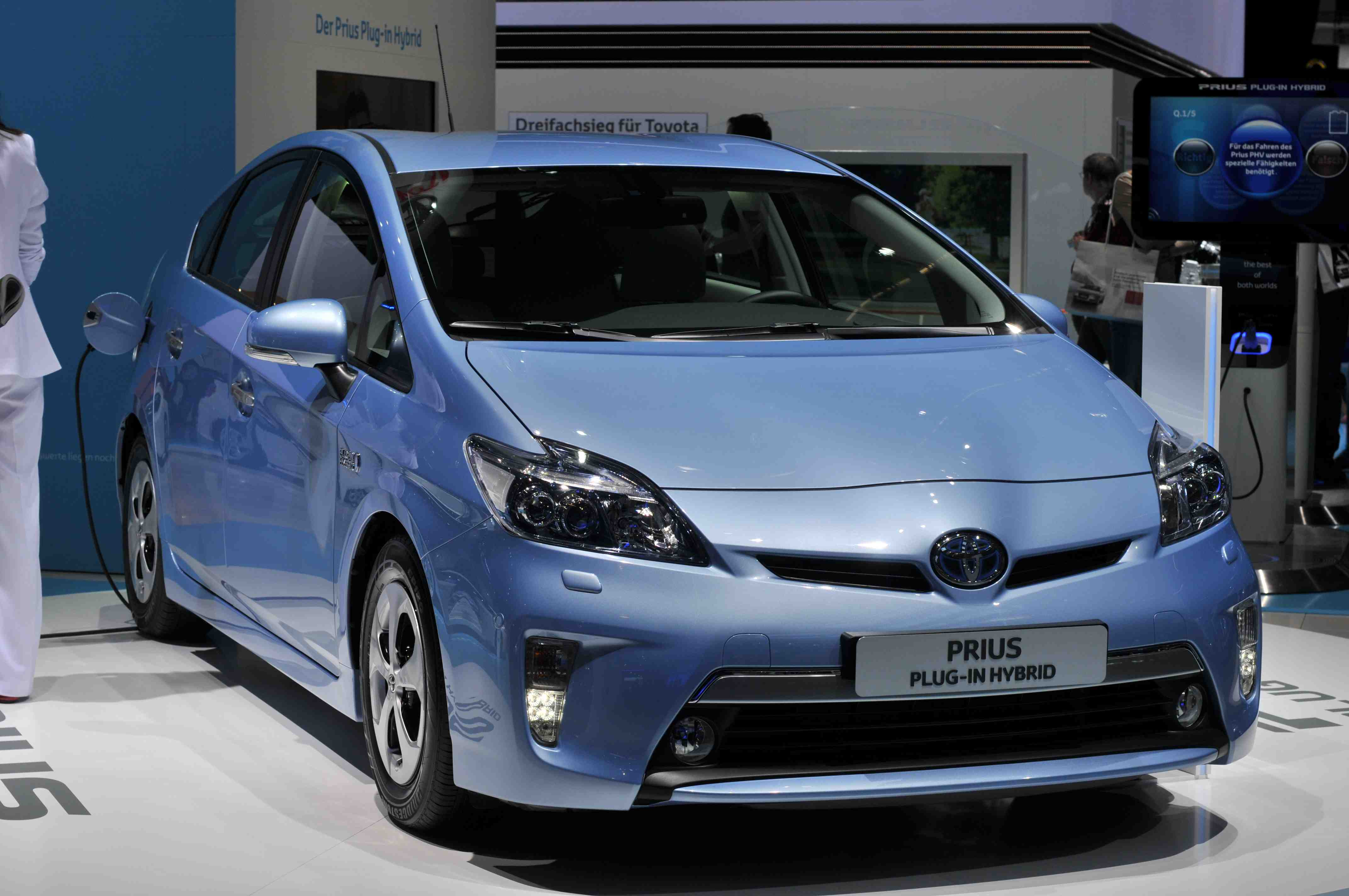
Prius Plug-in Hybrid exhibited at the 2011 Frankfurt Motor Show

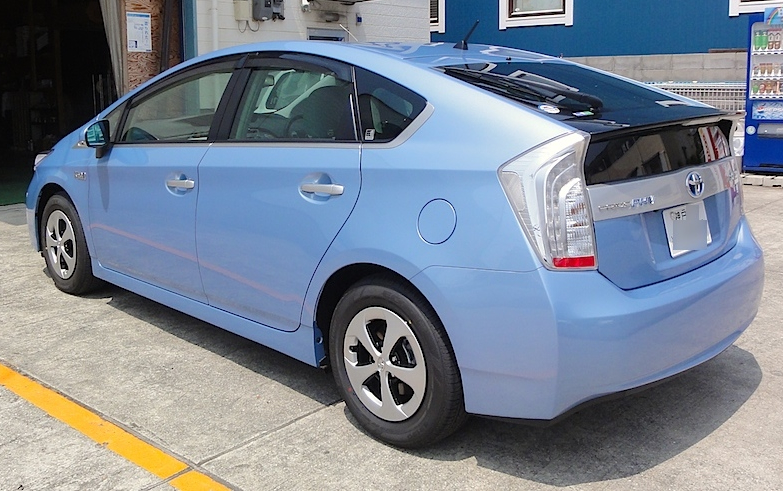
Prius Plug-in Hybrid

The Prius Plug-In Concept was shown at the October 2009 Tokyo Motor Show, the 2009 Frankfurt Motor Show, and the 2009 LA Auto Show. Toyota produced a limited number of Prius Plug-in Hybrids for a global demonstration program. The plug-in demonstration version is based on a third generation Toyota Prius outfitted with 5.2 kWh lithium-ion batteries, with an all-electric range of 21 km (13 mi). The global demonstration program involving 600 pre-production test cars began in late 2009 and took place in Japan, Europe, Canada, China, Australia, New Zealand and the United States.

The production version of the Prius Plug-in Hybrid was unveiled at the 2011 Frankfurt Motor Show. Modifications from the demonstration vehicle to improve efficiency allow the production plug-in to achieve an all-electric range of 23 km (14.3 mi) with a smaller 4.4-kWh lithium-ion battery. The Prius PHV was released in Japan in January 2012, deliveries in the United States began in late February 2012, and in the European market in June 2012.

== Safety ==
Euro NCAP test results* Toyota Prius 1.8VVT 'Sol', RHD (2009)
Test	Points	%
Overall:	5 /5 stars	
Adult occupant:	32	88%
Child occupant:	40	82%
Pedestrian:	24	68%
Safety assist:	6	86%

ANCAP test results* Toyota Yaris 5 door hatch (2009)
Test	Score
Overall	5 /5 stars
Frontal offset	15.24/16
Side impact	16/16
Pole	2/2
Seat belt reminders	2/3
Whiplash protection	Not Assessed
Pedestrian protection	Adequate
Electronic stability control	Standard

ASEAN NCAP test results Toyota Prius (2013)
Test	Points	Stars
Adult occupant:	15.30	5 /5 stars
Child occupant:	86%	0 /5 stars
Safety assist:	NA	

The IIHS rated the 2010 Prius as Good except for side-impact "structure/safety cage", which was rated Acceptable. In Euro NCAP testing, the Prius was given an overall rating of five out of five stars.

=== Recall ===
On February 9, 2010, Toyota announced a voluntary global recall of third generation 2010 Prius models manufactured from the current model's introduction through late January. Affected models, including 133,000 Priuses in the U.S. and 52,000 in Europe, are to receive an anti-lock brake software update to fix brake response over rough roads, following reports of delayed braking response on certain surface conditions. Apple co-founder and Prius collector Steve Wozniak was also quoted by media outlets regarding a possible cruise control issue on one of his several Priuses, where the steps for "upping the speed" using the Dynamic Radar Cruise Control system allegedly caused unintended acceleration. Wozniak later maintained that he was misquoted, but did have an individual vehicle and customer service issue, while auto journalists and other Prius drivers suggested user error. On March 8, 2010, a publicized incident of alleged Prius acceleration in San Diego was later suspected to be a hoax or not repeatable. The manufacturer shared that 713,000 Prius in North America, 997,000 in Japan, another 130,000 in Europe and the rest in other regions are being recalled.

On February 14, 2014, Toyota announced a global recall of third generation Prius related to a software fault in the hybrid-control system which might cause the hybrid drive inverter transistors to overheat and cause the car to enter a limited performance mode (i.e. limp home mode) or stall the car entirely. Owners were notified by mail to rectify the problem for free of charge.

In October 2018, Toyota issued a worldwide safety recall for about 2.4 million Prius vehicles, including 807,000 U.S. cars. The recall applied to two models - 2010-2014 Prius and 2012-2014 Prius V - that, when experiencing system issues, might fail to enter the fail-safe mode, causing the vehicle to lose power and stall. While power steering and braking should have continued to function, a stall at higher speeds could have increased crash risk.

== Market and production ==
The Toyota Prius XW30 was built at their Tsutsumi, Japan plant, as well as the Chachoengsao, Thailand plant. At the launch of the XW30, Toyota stated its goal of selling about 400,000 Prius units annually worldwide, and 180,000 units in the U.S. by 2010. As a result, in May 2009 production was increased to 50,000 units per month or 600,000 annual units to help meet higher than projected demand.

In early 2010, Toyota considered adding a monthly production of 6,000 at the Motomachi factory, in central Japan, the plant that built the first-generation Prius in 1997. However, as customers' wait time in Japan shortened from eight months at launch to three months, and sales in the United States dropped 40 percent in February 2010 from October 2009 following concerns about Toyota vehicles' safety, Toyota had to reduce the monthly production by 10 percent to 45,000 units a month in March 2010.

In China, Toyota originally planned to start producing the third generation Prius in 2010 (through its joint venture FAW-Toyota). However, due to lack of government incentives and worries about losing tech secrets, this plan was delayed to 2011.

=== Asia ===
In Japan, it is reported that Toyota cut the price of the Prius from ¥2,331,000 to ¥2,050,000 to compete with the Honda Insight.

The Prius in Japan is equipped with G-Book as of May 18, 2009.

The XW30 Prius was awarded the 2009 Japan Car of the Year.

In South Korea, Toyota has marketed the Prius since 2014 as a hybrid taxi since Hyundai and Kia at the time did not manufacture or sell any hybrid taxis. In 2019, it retailed at ₩26,000,000 (US$25,451 at the August 2019 exchange rate). This is part of their strategy in entering the taxi industry, which is dominated by Korean car manufacturers. It earned some good reception with taxi drivers due to its fuel economy.

=== Europe ===
The official UK fuel consumption data, provided by the Department for Transport, rates the Prius as: 72.4 mpg_{‑imp} (3.90 L/100 km; 60.3 mpg_{‑US}) combined. Nineteen other car models match or exceed that figure as of February 2011.

According to the UK Department for Transport in February 2011, the third-generation Prius launched in the UK in August 2009 emits 89 g/km CO_{2}, the same as the Škoda Fabia (Hatch and Estate), the Volkswagen Polo and the Toyota Auris Hybrid, and less than all other cars except the Smart fortwo which emits 86 g/km.

=== North America ===
In the U.S. market, trim levels Prius Two, Three, Four and Five were offered. Among the new standard features of the 2010 Prius, Toyota introduced three optional user-selectable driving modes: EV mode for electric-only low-speed operation, Eco mode for best fuel efficiency, and Power mode for better performance. The premium Prius Five model's Advanced Technology Package included the Premium HDD Navigation System, Head-up Display, Dynamic Radar Cruise Control, Pre-Collision System and Lane Keep Assist. The Pre-Collision System retracted the front seatbelts and applied the brakes in certain conditions when it determines that a crash is imminent. Lane Keep Assist helped the driver stay within the lane. The US 2012 model year included Toyota's Vehicle Proximity Notification System (VPNS), which emitted an artificial engine noise to alert others to the vehicle's presence and overcome the otherwise easily-overlooked low powertrain noise of a hybrid vehicle traveling at low speed in all-electric mode.

Standard equipment included 15-inch alloy wheels, Vehicle Stability Control, cruise control, 6-speaker audio, keyless entry/ignition Smart Key System and a display, marketed as Touch Tracer Display, to help the driver's eyes stay on the road when using the steering-wheel-mounted climate and audio controls. Option packages included:

- Navigation Package: a voice-activated touch-screen DVD-based navigation system, 8-speaker JBL audio system with XM satellite radio, MP3/WMA playback capability, Bluetooth and backup camera.
- Solar Roof Package: includes Navigation Package equipment as well as power tilt/slide moonroof along with a solar powered ventilation system that uses an electric fan to help keep the vehicle cooler when parked under the sun by venting the interior's heated air with the outdoors. The solar roof was originally intended to assist in charging the vehicle's battery, but the system was configured to only power ventilation when it was found that the battery-charging configuration created electromagnetic interference that affected the radio. A new remote air-conditioning feature allows the driver to activate the air conditioner prior to entering the vehicle.
- Advanced Technology Package: includes the Navigation Package while adding a Pre-Collision System, Dynamic Radar Cruise Control, Lane Keep Assist and Intelligent Parking Assist.
- Plus Performance Package: announced in June 2011. This package includes a seven-piece body kit, 17-inch alloy wheels, special badging, and rear anti-sway bar. The car was also lowered by 28 mm (1.1 in) at the front and 33 mm (1.3 in) at the rear.

Other options include Safety Connect, while LED headlamps come standard on the Prius V trim.

In the U.S., the Environmental Protection Agency (EPA) tested the XW30 based on the revised 2007 testing procedures, resulting in the following scores: 51 mpg_{‑US} (4.6 L/100 km; 61 mpg_{‑imp}) city driving, 48 mpg_{‑US} (4.9 L/100 km; 58 mpg_{‑imp}) highway driving, 50 mpg_{‑US} (4.7 L/100 km; 60 mpg_{‑imp}) combined. The Prius XW30 was the most efficient car powered purely by liquid fuel available in the U.S., based on the official rating. Only the discontinued first-generation Honda Insight attained higher fuel efficiency: 62 mpg_{‑US} (3.8 L/100 km; 74 mpg_{‑imp}) (for manual/no air conditioner option).

In the U.S., the EPA measures a vehicle's air-borne pollution based on hydrocarbons, nitrogen oxides, carbon monoxide, particulate matter and formaldehyde before assigning them a score. In most states, the XW30 Prius is rated Tier II Bin 3.

In 2009, Toyota Prius experienced two consecutive year over year sales decrease to 139,682 units in the U.S., from 181,221 units in 2007.

== 2011 facelift ==
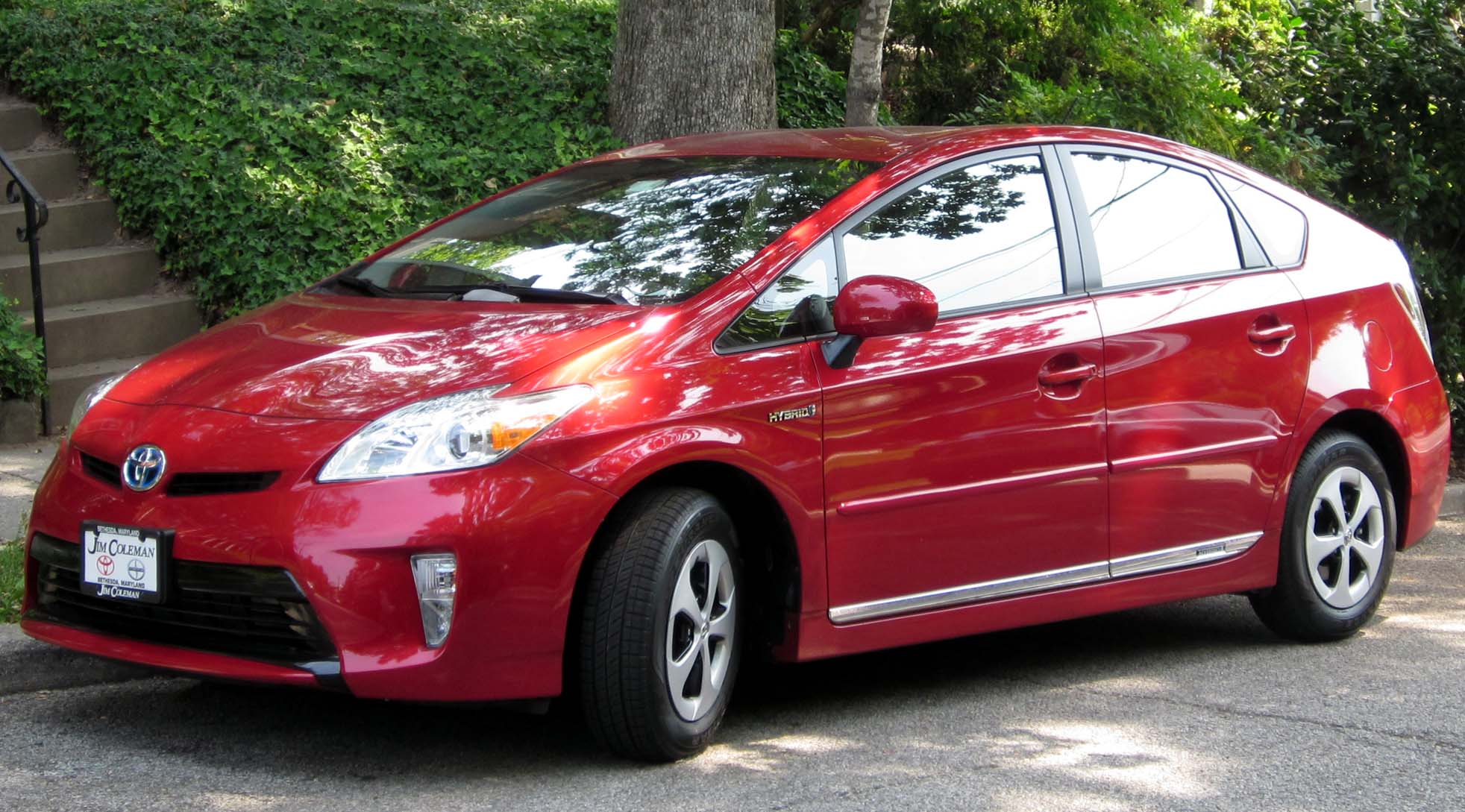

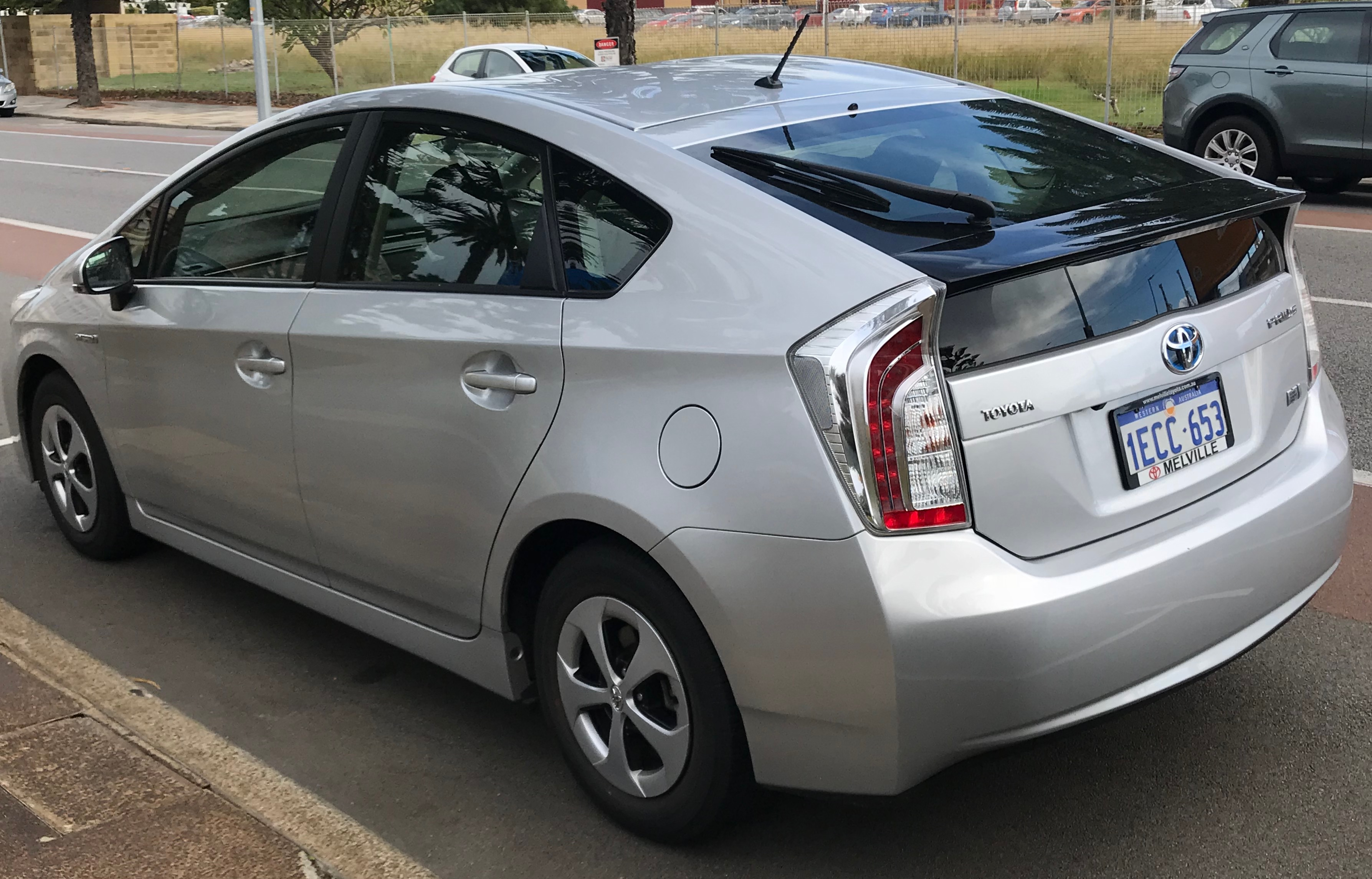
2011 facelift

In 2011 (for the 2012 model year), the third-generation Prius Liftback received modest style and equipment changes. The exterior changes included updated headlamps, revised tail lamps, and revised front fascia and bumper. The Prius could be equipped with an updated infotainment system featuring the optional Toyota Entune suite of connectivity features. Other updates included a 6.1-inch touch-screen, AM/FM CD player unit, a USB port for iPod connectivity, auxiliary input jack, Bluetooth hands-free phone capability and streaming audio.

For the U.S. market, only the Prius Two, Three, Four and Five trim levels were offered. The Prius Two gained new 15-inch wheel covers and standard LED Daytime Running Lights (DRL). The Prius Three added a standard three-door Smart Key entry system, and the Prius Four featured standard auto on/off headlamps. The Prius Four also provided enhanced comfort with new SofTex-trimmed seats and an eight-way power adjustable driver's seat. The premium Prius Five model's Advanced Technology Package included the Premium HDD Navigation System, and the Head-up Display, Dynamic Radar Cruise Control, Pre-Collision System and Lane Keep Assist. The Pre-Collision System retracted the front seatbelts and applied brakes in certain conditions when it determined that a crash was unavoidable. Lane Keep Assist could help the driver stay within the lane.

The U.S. 2012 model year included Toyota's Vehicle Proximity Notification System (VPNS), alerting others to the vehicle's presence, to overcome the otherwise easily overlooked low powertrain noise of a hybrid vehicle traveling at low speed in all-electric mode. This type of warning device was mandated by the Pedestrian Safety Enhancement Act of 2010. The warning sound was generated by externally mounted speakers and it activated automatically only at speeds below about 24 km/h (15 mph).
