= Toyota Prius (XW50) =

5-door liftback car manufactured by Toyota

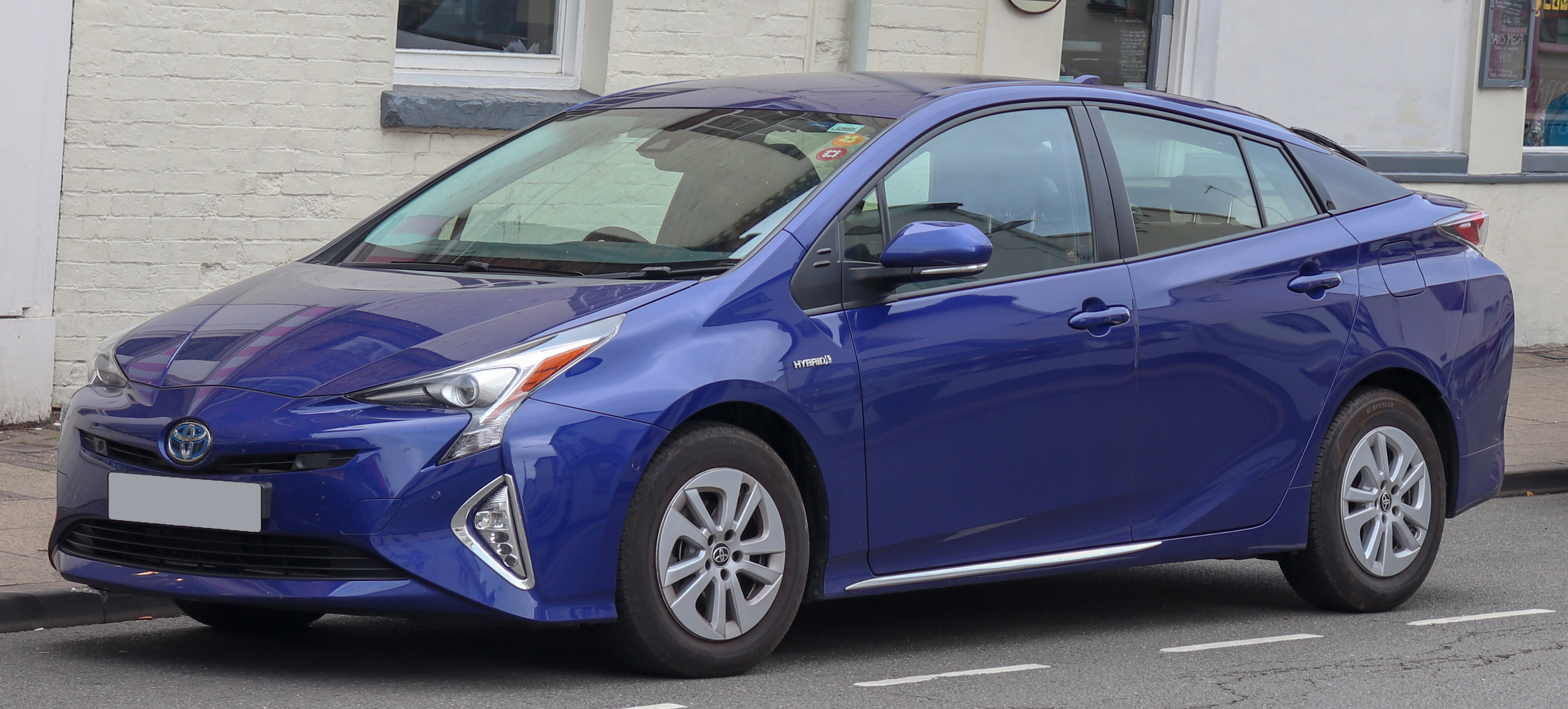

Overview
- Manufacturer: Toyota
- Production: November 2015 – 2022
- Model years: 2016–2022
- Assembly: Japan: Toyota, Aichi (Tsutsumi plant)
- Designer: Shunsaku Kodama (2012)

Body and chassis
- Class: Compact car (C)
- Body style: 5-door liftback
- Layout: Front-engine, front-wheel-drive; Front-engine, all-wheel-drive (AWD-e)
- Platform: TNGA: GA-C
- Related: Toyota Prius PHV/Prime (XW50); Toyota Corolla (E210)

Powertrain
- Engine: 1.8 L 2ZR-FXE I4 (gasoline hybrid)
- Electric motor: Dual motor–generator (MG) system: MG1 (model 1SM): 23 kW (31 hp); MG2 (model 1NM): 53 kW (71 hp); Rear: 5 kW (6.7 hp) (AWD-e)
- Transmission: eCVT
- Hybrid drivetrain: Power-split (Hybrid Synergy Drive)
- Battery: 0.75 kWh lithium-ion (FWD); 1.2 kWh nickel-metal hydride (AWD-e)

Dimensions
- Wheelbase: 2,700 mm (106.3 in)
- Length: 4,570 mm (180.0 in)
- Width: 1,760 mm (69.3 in)
- Height: 1,470 mm (57.9 in)
- Curb weight: 1,365–1,397 kg (3,010–3,080 lb)

Chronology
- Predecessor: Toyota Prius (XW30)
- Successor: Toyota Prius (XW60); Toyota Corolla Hybrid (Australia & New Zealand)

The fourth-generation Toyota Prius is a compact car that was manufactured by Japanese automaker Toyota from 2015 to 2022. It was first shown during September 2015 in Las Vegas, and was released for retail customers in Japan on 9 December 2015. The launch in North American market occurred in January 2016, and February in Europe and the Middle East. Toyota expected to sell 12,000 fourth generation Prius cars a month in Japan, and to reach annual sales between 300,000 and 350,000 units.

== Overview ==
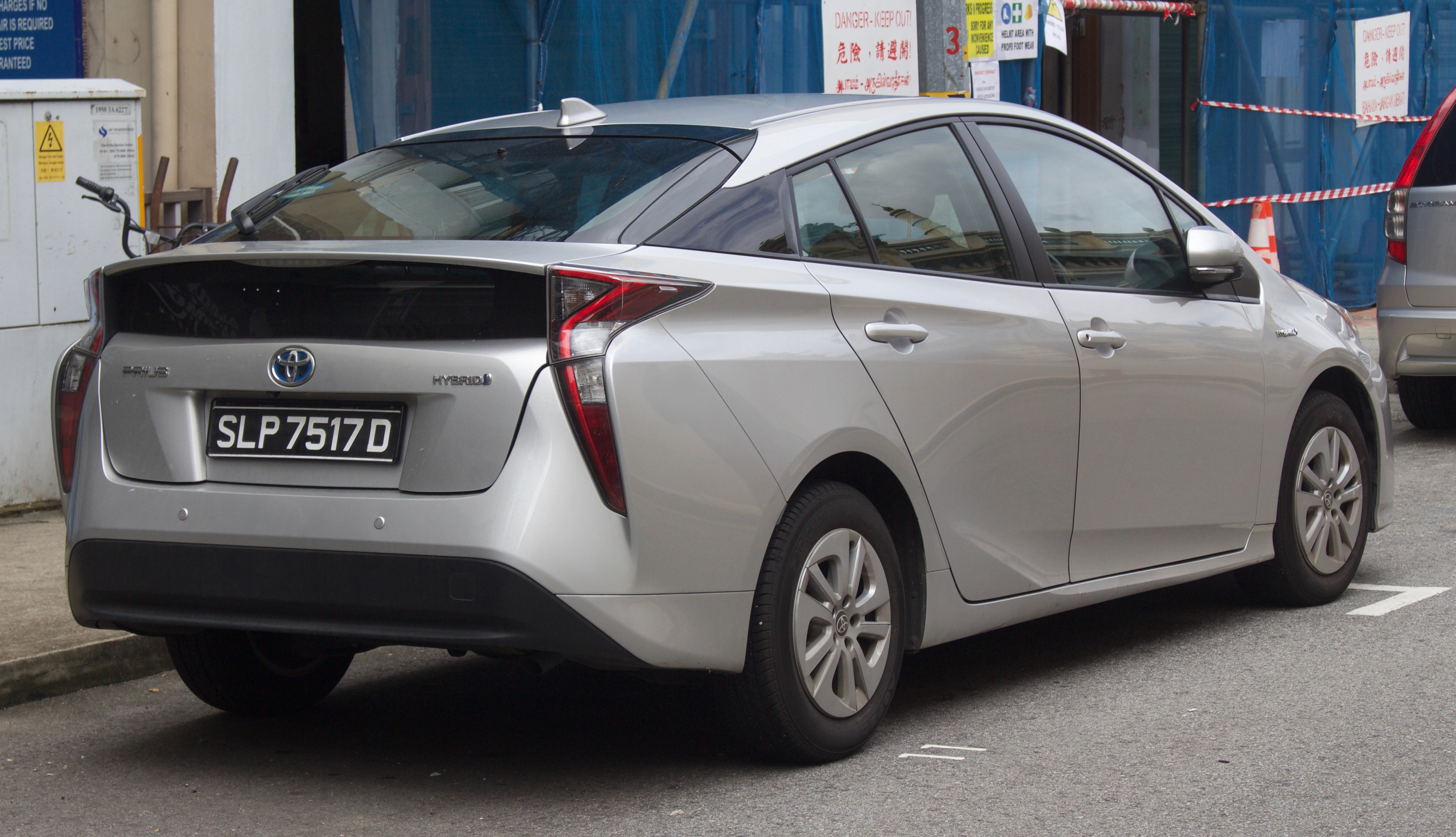
2017 Toyota Prius Hybrid (Singapore; pre-facelift)

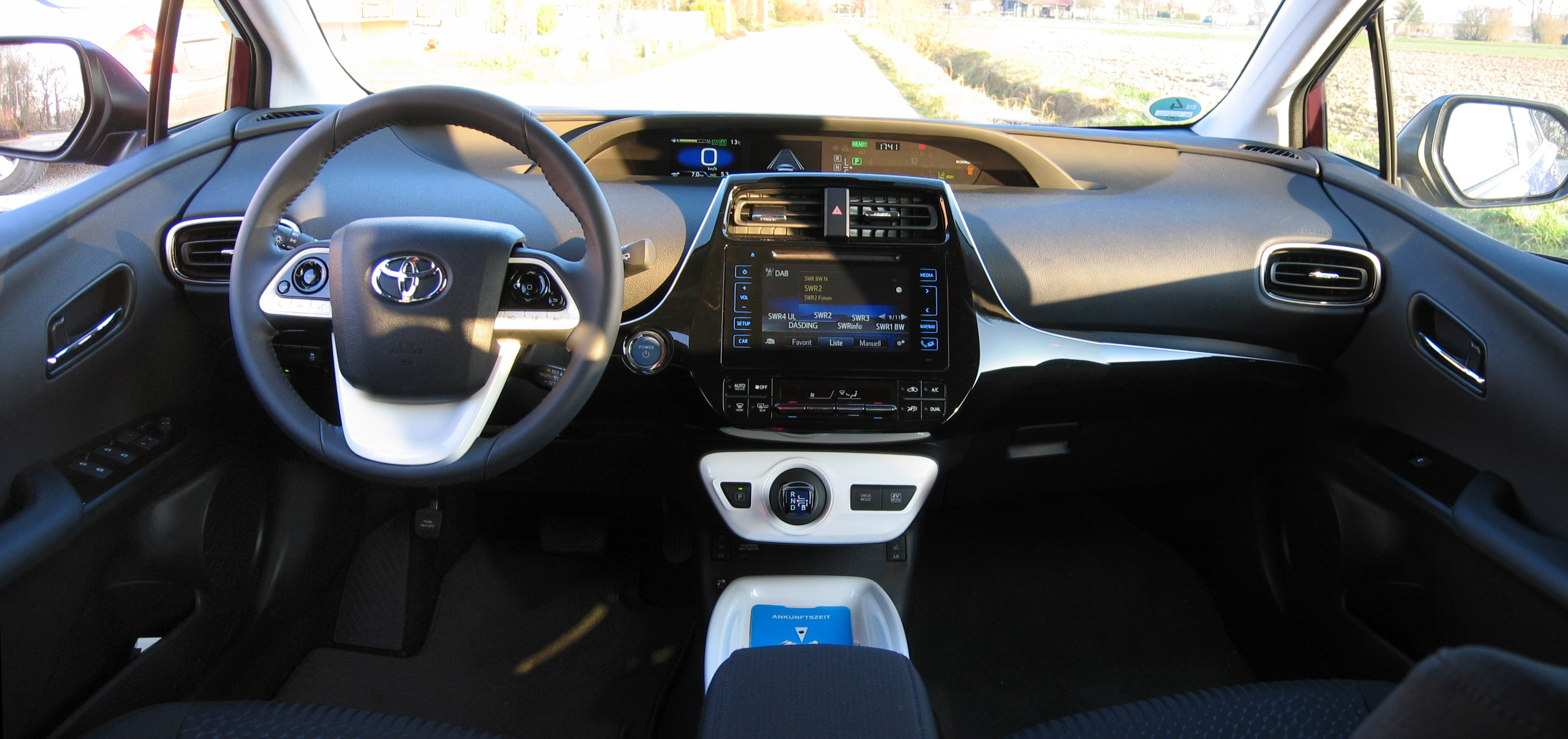
Interior

The fourth-generation Prius was designed to deliver significantly improved fuel economy in a more compact package that is lighter in weight and lower in cost. These objectives were achieved through the development of a new generation of powertrains with significant advances in battery, electric motor and gasoline engine technologies.

In August 2013, Toyota Managing Officer Satoshi Ogiso, who was chief engineer for the Prius line, announced some of the improvements and key features of the next generation Prius. The next Prius is the first vehicle to use the Toyota New Global Architecture (TNGA) modular platform, which provides a lower center of gravity and increased structural rigidity. These features, along with other improvements allow for gains in ride-and-handling, agility and aerodynamics. The improved aerodynamics contribute to an all-new exterior design, which includes a roomier interior. Ogiso also explained that the next-generation Prius plug-in hybrid, the Prius Prime, was developed in parallel with the standard Prius model.

The fourth-generation Prius is 6.1 centimetres (2.4 in) longer, 1.5 cm (0.6 in) wider and 2.0 cm (0.8 in) lower; at the rear a double wishbone independent suspension replaces its predecessors' torsion beam. The front uses standard LED headlamps. Toyota has claimed that it has a drag coefficient of Cd=0.24, better than the 0.25 claimed for the third-generation model, and the same as the American Tesla Model S. A tow hitch option is available in the UK for up to 725 kilograms (1,600 lb).

The vehicle features smaller electric motors, with higher power density than the previous Prius motors and the gasoline engine features a maximum thermal efficiency greater than 40% (that of the third-generation Prius is 38.5%).

The fourth-generation Prius also uses a 0.75 kWh lithium-ion battery pack that offers higher energy density than the 1.3 kWh nickel-metal hydride battery used in the prior generation.

In late November 2018, for the 2019 model year, the U.S. market Prius lineup introduced an all-wheel drive model (AWD-e) featuring Toyota's E-Four system, that adds a motor to the rear axle. This has been available for the Japanese market Prius since 2015 and the hybrid versions of the RAV4 and Lexus NX. The AWD-e models use a 1.2 kWh nickel–metal hydride battery that performs better in areas with colder temperatures where drivers favor all-wheel drive.

Also in 2019, the trim levels in the U.S. market were renamed from One, Two, Three and Four, to L, LE, XLE, and Limited, respectively, which put the structure in line with other Toyota models.

In the Japanese market, the vehicle was offered in four trim levels: E, S, A and A Premium. Touring Selection versions were offered with all trim levels above E. The S Safety Plus Special Edition trim was launched in August 2016, which included the Toyota Safety Sense P package with the S trim level. Commemorating the 20th anniversary of the Prius model, Toyota launched the S Safety Plus Two Tone and A Premium Touring Selection 20th Anniversary Limited editions with a two-tone colour scheme which pair selected colours with the roof and door mirrors painted in Attitude Black Mica and Gloss Piano Black interior trims replacing those in white found in most models.

=== Efficiency ===
The Prius fuel economy has improved on average by about 10% each generation, and Toyota has set the challenge to continue to improve at this rate.

Under the Japanese JC08 cycle test, Toyota expects the fourth generation Prius to achieve a fuel economy rating of 2.5 L/100 km (115.3 mpg_{‑imp}; 96.0 mpg_{‑US}).

The fourth-generation Prius has an official EPA fuel economy rating of 4.4 L/100 km (64.9 mpg_{‑imp}; 54 mpg_{‑US}) for city, 4.7 L/100 km (60.0 mpg_{‑imp}; 50 mpg_{‑US}) for highway, and 4.5 L/100 km (62.4 mpg_{‑imp}; 52 mpg_{‑US}) for combined driving. The new generation offered a 58.8 L/100 km (4.8 mpg_{‑imp}; 4 mpg_{‑US}), or 8.3%, improvement over the combined driving rating of the third-generation Prius.

Toyota also offers an "Eco" base-model variant of the fourth-generation Prius with improved efficiency, largely due to the reduced weight, achieved by eliminating the spare tire, a rear-window wiper and trunk-lid lining. The Eco variant has an official EPA rating of 4.1 L/100 km (69.7 mpg_{‑imp}; 58 mpg_{‑US}) city, 4.4 L/100 km (63.7 mpg_{‑imp}; 53 mpg_{‑US}) highway, and 4.2 L/100 km (67.3 mpg_{‑imp}; 56 mpg_{‑US}) combined. The Eco offered a 29.4 L/100 km (9.6 mpg_{‑imp}; 8 mpg_{‑US}), or 16.7%, improvement over the combined driving rating of the third-generation Prius.

The Eco variant passed the first-generation Honda Insight's 4.4 L/100 km (63.7 mpg_{‑imp}; 53 mpg_{‑US}) as the most fuel efficient car available in the US without plug-in capability. However the Honda Insight still achieves a higher highway rating of 3.9 L/100 km (73.3 mpg_{‑imp}; 61 mpg_{‑US}).

== Facelift ==
The Prius received a facelift with redesigned headlights and tail lights, which was released in Japan on 17 December 2018.

In 2020, for the 2021 model year, Toyota USA released the 2020 Edition Prius. Based on the XLE model, differences were mostly black wheels, badges and trim and carpets with a "Prius 2020 Edition" insert.

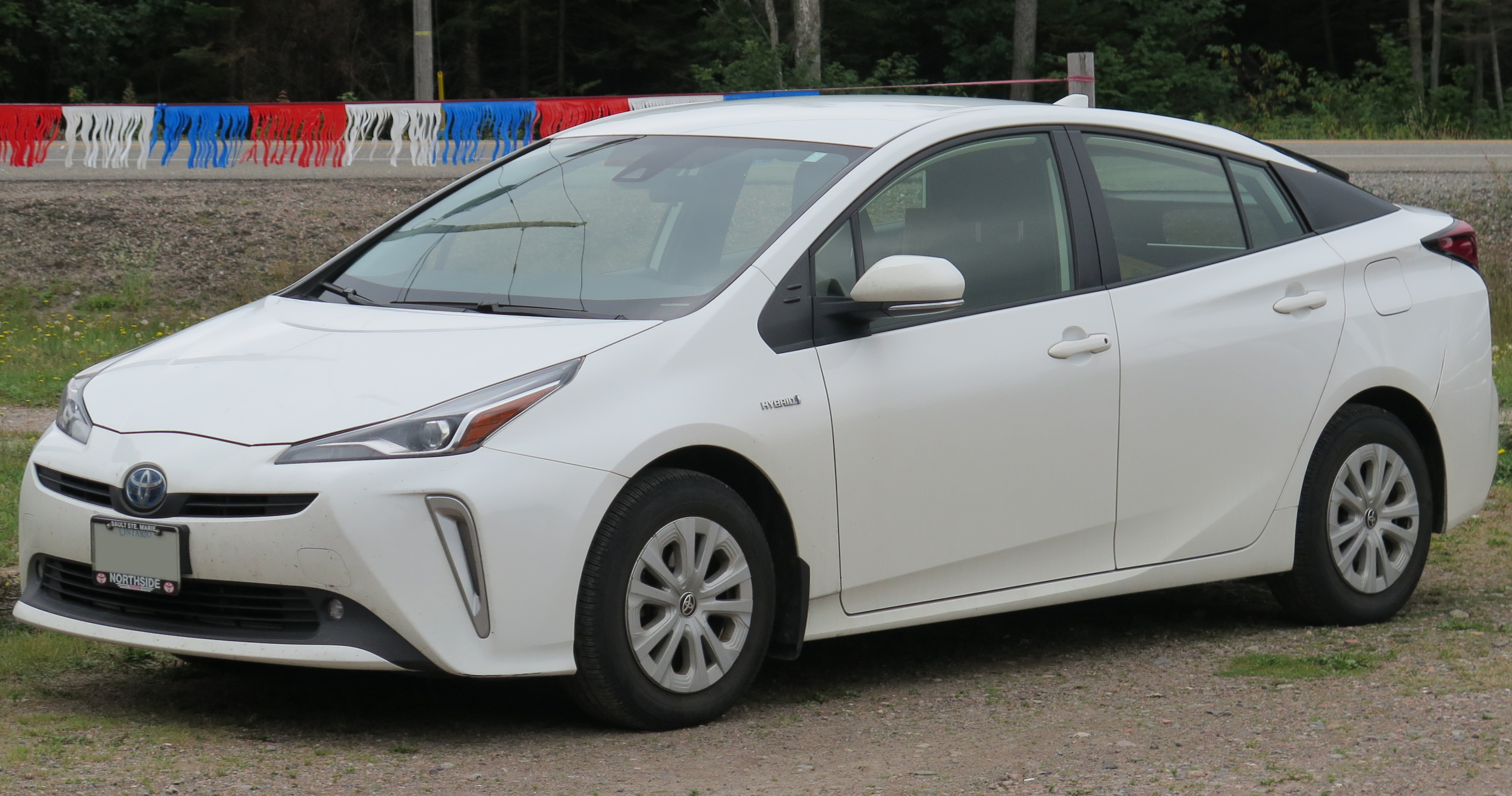
2019 Toyota Prius AWD-e (facelift, Canada)

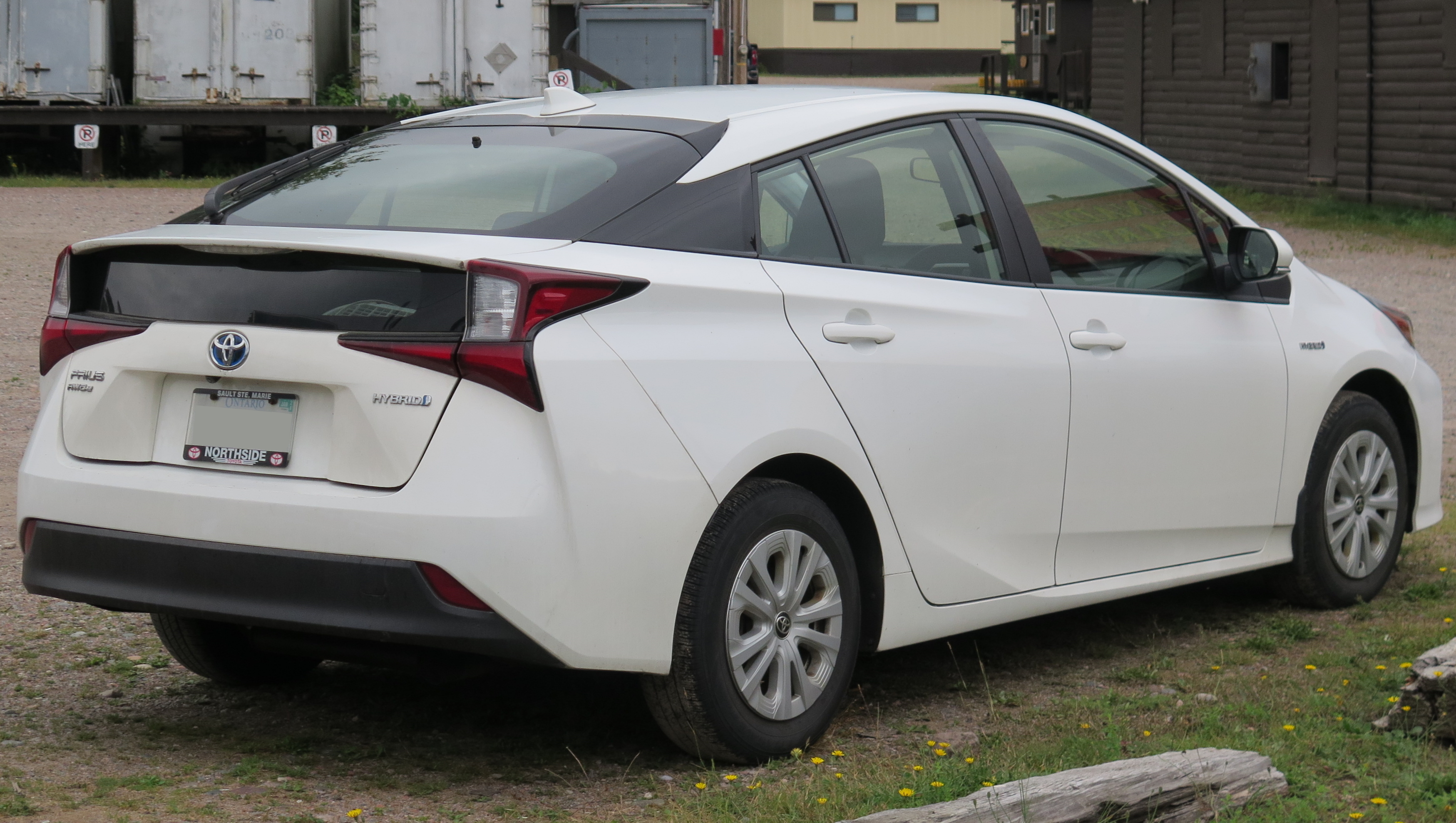
2019 Toyota Prius AWD-e (facelift, Canada)

== Safety ==
The 2022 Prius was tested by the US IIHS:

IIHS scores
Small overlap front (Driver)	Good
Small overlap front (Passenger)	Acceptable
Moderate overlap front	Good
Side (original test)	Good
Roof strength	Good
Head restraints and seats	Good
Headlights	Acceptable
Front crash prevention (Vehicle-to-Vehicle)	Superior
Front crash prevention (Vehicle-to-Pedestrian, day)	Superior
Child seat anchors (LATCH) ease of use	Good+

ANCAP test results Toyota Prius (2016)
Test	Score
Overall	5 /5 stars
Frontal offset	15.22/16
Side impact	16/16
Pole	2/2
Seat belt reminders	3/3
Whiplash protection	Good
Pedestrian protection	Good
Electronic stability control	Standard

== Discontinuation ==
Australia and New Zealand, as well as the UK, discontinued the Prius in early January 2022.

It was discontinued in New Zealand in August 2021, and at the time was reduced to the Prius Prime plug-in hybrid model, with the regular hybrid discontinued in 2020. It was discontinued due to slow sales as only 38 were sold nationally between January and July 2021.

The Prius was discontinued in Australia in May 2022 after 21 years because other Toyota hybrid models were selling well and its unique selling point had been lost.
