= Toyota Prius =

Hybrid compact car produced by Toyota

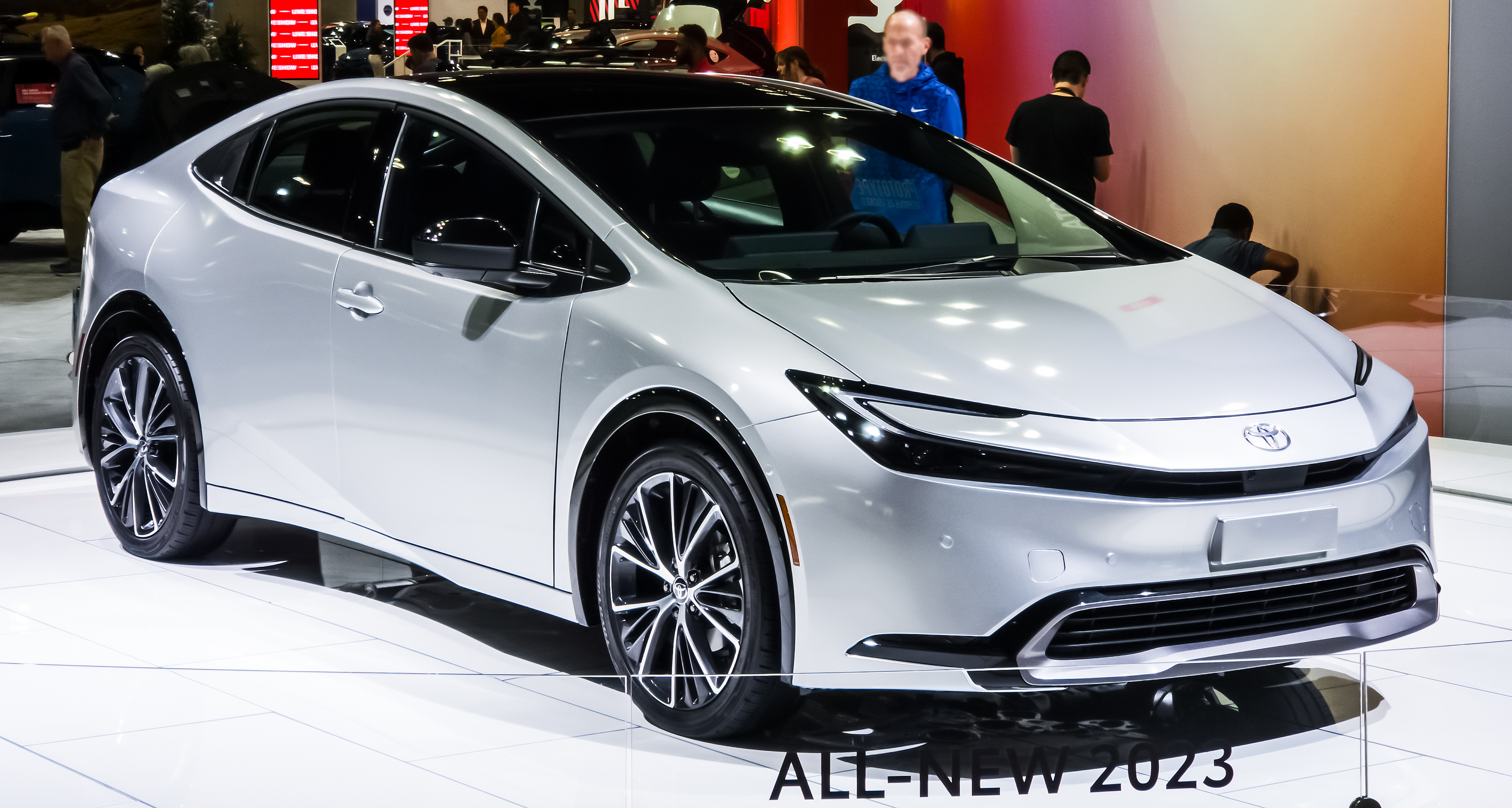
- Fifth generation Prius (XW60)

Overview
- Manufacturer: Toyota
- Production: December 1997 – present
- Model years: 2001–present (US)

Body and chassis
- Class: Subcompact/supermini (B) (1997–2003); Compact/small family car (C) (2003–present)
- Body style: 4-door saloon (1997–2003); 5-door liftback (2003–present)
- Layout: Front-engine, front-wheel-drive; Front-engine, four-wheel-drive (E-Four)

Release timeline
1997	XW10
1998–2002
2003	XW20
2004–2008
2009	XW30
2010
2011	Prius V
2011	Prius C
2012	Plug-in XW30
2013–2014
2015	XW50
2016	Plug-in XW50
2017–2021
2022	XW60
2023	Plug-in XW60

The Toyota Prius (/ˈpriːəs/ PREE-əss) (Japanese: トヨタ・プリウス, Hepburn: Toyota Puriusu) is a car produced by Toyota since 1997 over five generations. The Prius has a hybrid drivetrain, called Hybrid Synergy Drive, which combines an internal combustion engine and an electric motor. Initially offered as a subcompact four-door saloon, it has been produced only as a compact five-door liftback since 2003.

The Prius was developed by Toyota to be the "car for the 21st century"; it was the first mass-produced hybrid vehicle, first going on sale in Japan in 1997 at all four Toyota Japan dealership chains, and subsequently introduced worldwide in 2000.

In 2011, Toyota expanded the Prius family to include the Prius v (also known as the Prius α, and Prius+ in several markets), an MPV, and the Prius c (also known as the Aqua), a subcompact hatchback. The production version of the Prius plug-in hybrid was released in 2012. The second generation of the plug-in variant, the Prius Prime, was released in the US in November 2016. The Prius family totaled global cumulative sales of 6.1 million units in January 2017, representing 61% of the 10 million hybrids sold worldwide by Toyota since 1997. Toyota sells the Prius in over 90 markets, with Japan and the United States being its largest markets.

== Etymology and terminology ==
Prius is a Latin word meaning "first", "original", "superior" or "to go before".

In February 2011, Toyota USA asked the US public to decide on what the most proper plural form of Prius should be, with choices including Prien, Prii, Prium, Prius, or Priuses. The company announced on 20 February that "Prii" was the most popular choice, and the new official plural designation in the US.

In Latin prius is the neuter singular of the comparative form (prior, prior, prius) of an adjective with only comparative and superlative (the superlative being primus, prima, primum). As with all neuter words, the Latin plural is priora, but that brand name was used by the Lada Priora in 2007. Despite the "official" plural form used by Toyota USA, "Priuses" is widely used in English.

Beginning in September 2011, Toyota USA began using the following names to differentiate the original Prius from some newer members of the Prius family: the standard Prius became the Prius Liftback, the Prius v (known as the Prius α in Japan, and Prius + in Europe), the Prius Plug-in Hybrid, and the Prius c (called Toyota Aqua in Japan).

== First generation (XW10; 1997) ==
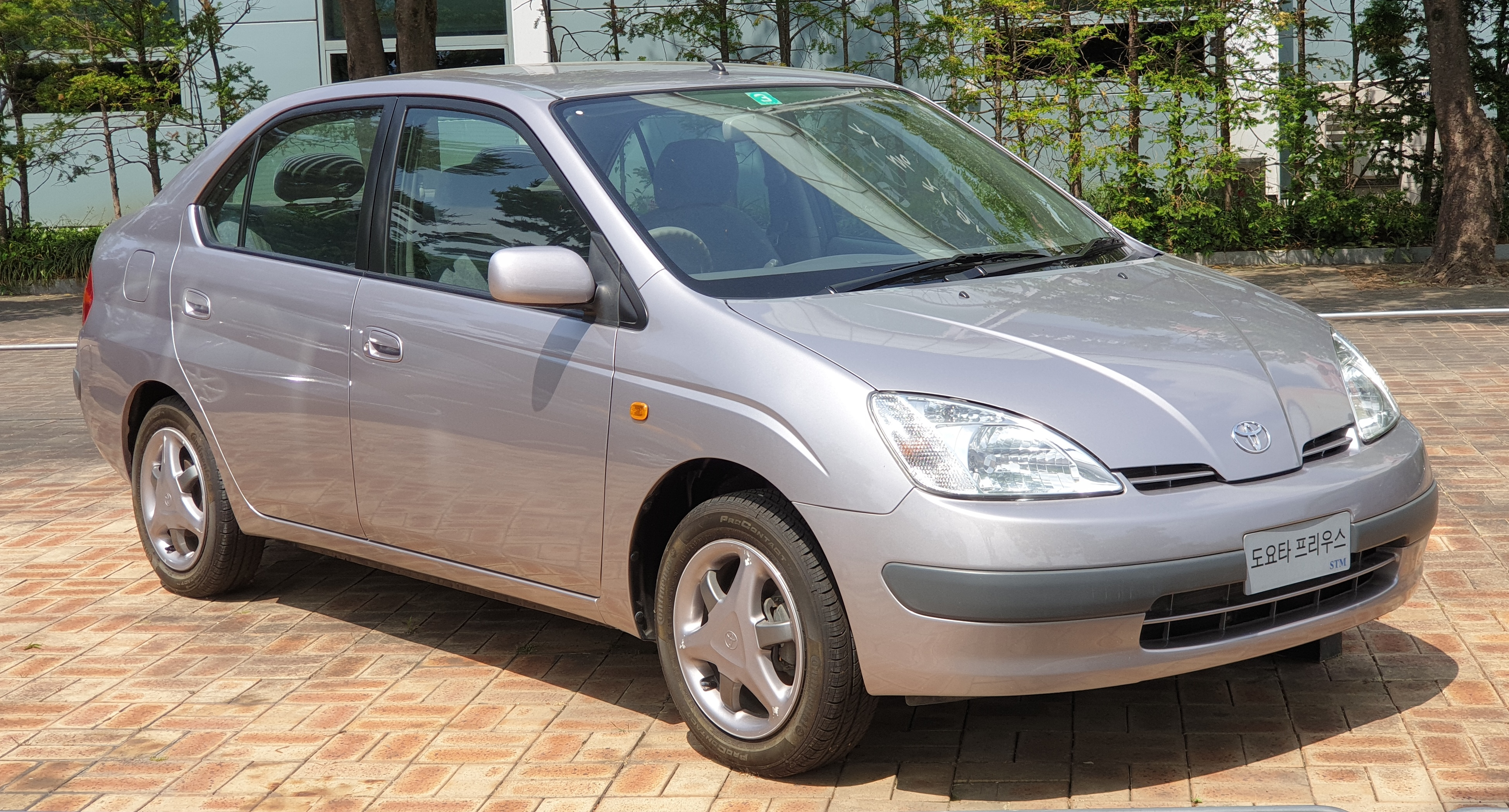
Toyota Prius (NHW10, first generation)

=== NHW10 (1997–2000) ===
In 1995, Toyota debuted a hybrid concept car at the Tokyo Motor Show, with testing following a year later. The first Prius, model NHW10, went on sale on 10 December 1997. The first-generation Prius (NHW10) was available only in Japan.

The first-generation Prius, at its launch, became the world's first mass-produced petrol-electric hybrid car. At its introduction in 1997, it won the Car of the Year Japan Award, and in 1998, it won the Automotive Researchers' and Journalists' Conference Car of the Year award in Japan.

Production commenced in December 1997 at the Takaoka plant in Toyota, Aichi, ending in February 2000 after cumulative production of 37,425 vehicles.

The NHW10 Prius styling originated from California designers, who were selected over competing designs from other Toyota design studios.

=== NHW11 (2000–2003) ===
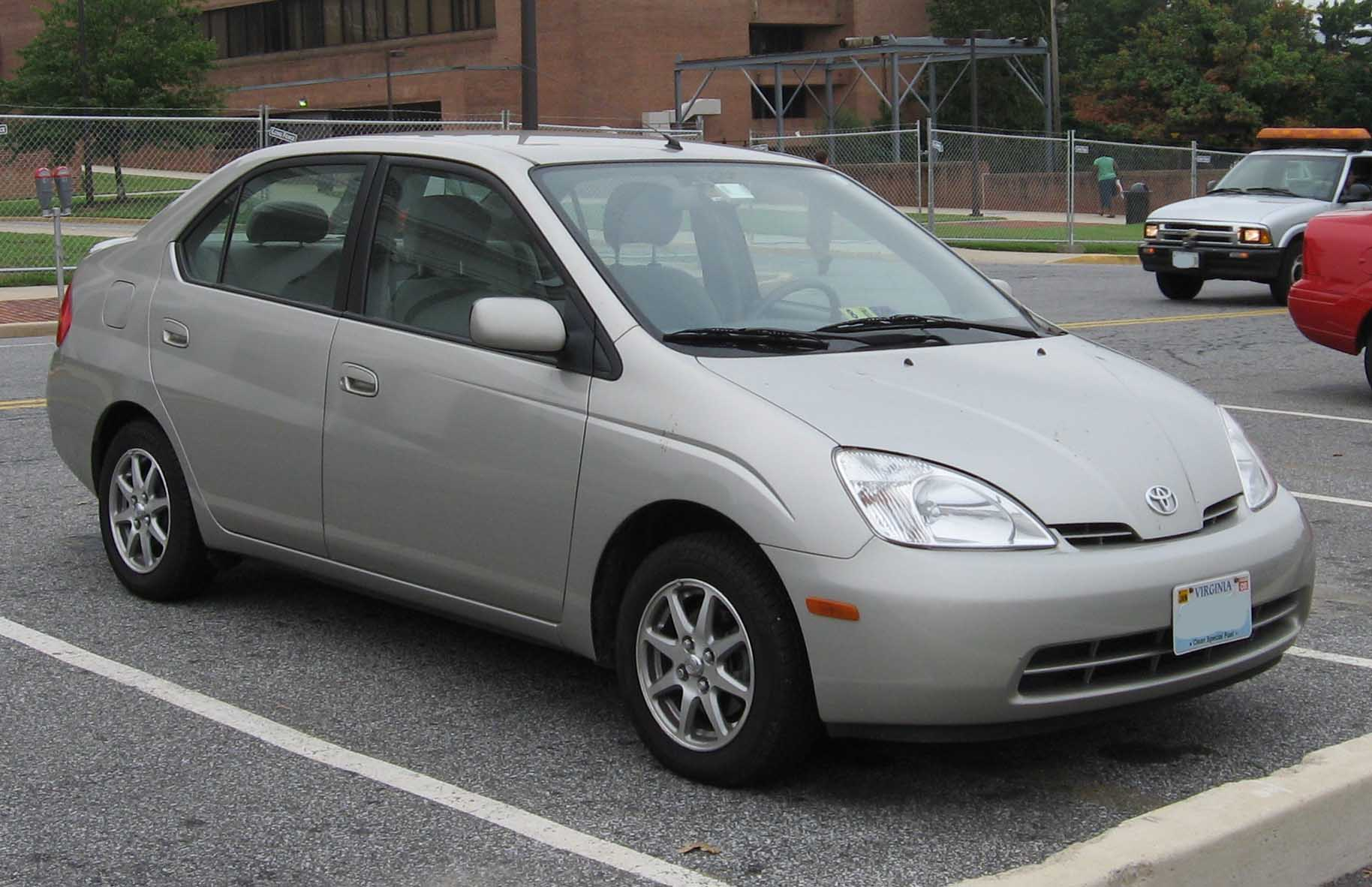
Toyota Prius (NHW11, first generation)

The Prius NHW11 (sometimes referred to as "Generation II") was the first Prius sold by Toyota outside of Japan, with sales in limited numbers beginning in the year 2000 in Asia, America, Europe and Australia. In the United States, the Prius was marketed between the smaller Corolla and the larger Camry, with a published retail price of US$19,995 (equivalent to $37,400 in 2025). European sales began in September 2000. The official launch of the Prius in Australia occurred at the October 2001 Sydney Motor Show, although sales were slow until the NHW20 (XW20) model arrived. Toyota sold about 123,000 first-generation Priuses.

Production of the NHW11 model commenced in May 2000 at the Motomachi plant in Toyota, Aichi, and continued until June 2003 after 33,411 NHW11 vehicles had been produced. The vehicle was the second mass-produced hybrid on the American market, after the two-seat Honda Insight.

The NHW11 Prius became more powerful partly to satisfy the higher speeds and longer distances that Americans drive. Electric power steering was standard equipment. While the larger Prius could seat five, its battery pack restricted cargo space. The Prius was offered in the US in three trim packages: Standard, Base, and Touring. The US EPA (CARB) classified the car with an air pollution score of 3 out of 10 as an Ultra Low Emission Vehicle (ULEV). Prius owners were eligible for up to a US$2,000 federal tax deduction from their gross income. Toyota executives stated that with the Prius NHW10 model, the company had been losing money on each Prius sold, and with the NHW11 it was now breaking even.

A 2019 iSeeCars study on used cars from the 1981 to 2003 model years sold in 2018 ranked the Prius as the second longest-kept vehicle among US drivers.

== Second generation (XW20; 2003) ==
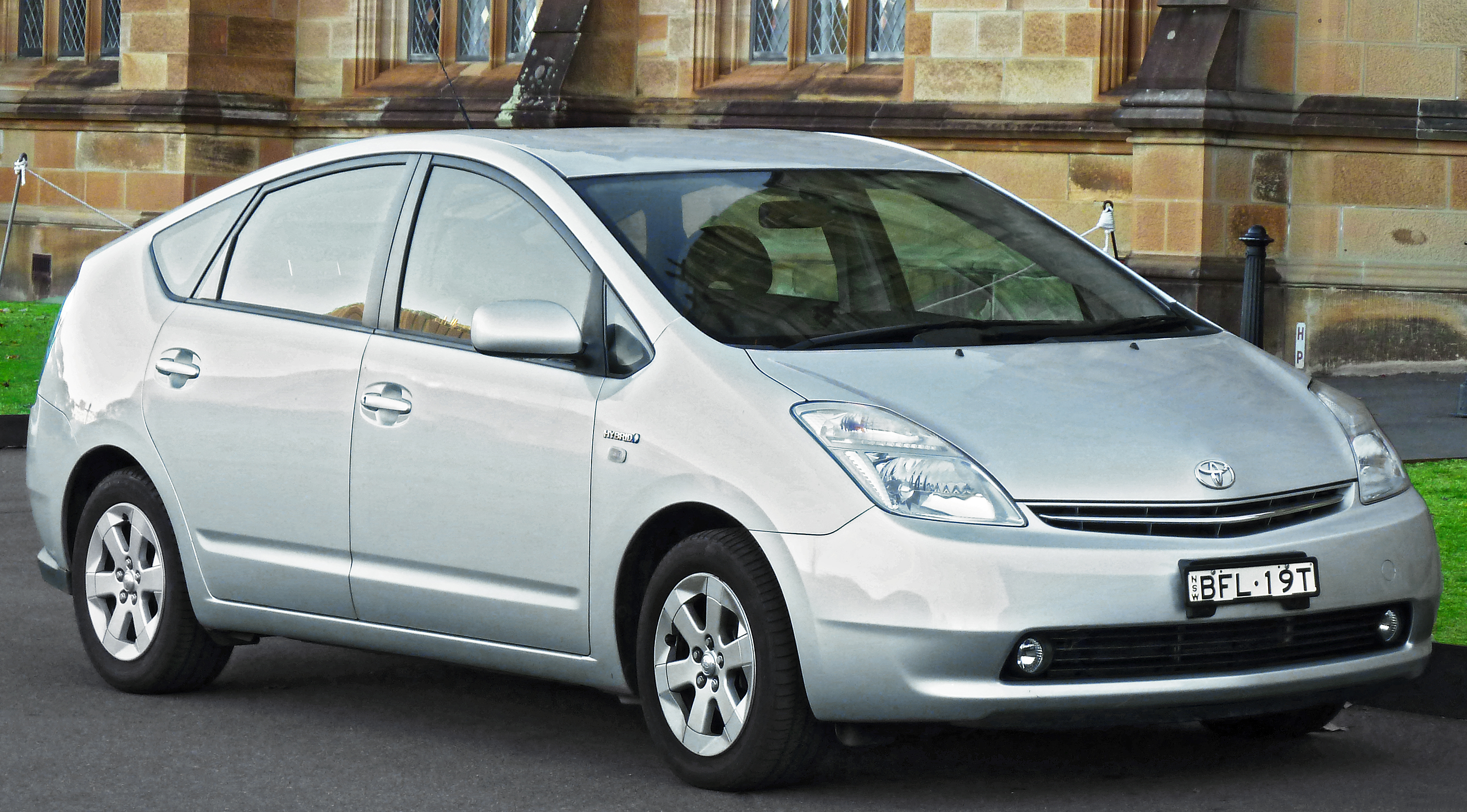
Toyota Prius (second generation)

Presented at the April 2003 New York International Auto Show, for the 2004 US model year, the NHW20 Prius was a complete redesign. It became a compact liftback, sized between the Corolla and the Camry, with redistributed mechanical and interior space significantly increasing rear-seat legroom and luggage room. The second-generation Prius is more environmentally friendly than the previous model (according to the EPA), and is 6 inches (150 mm) longer than the previous version. Its more aerodynamic Kammback body balances length and wind resistance, resulting in a drag coefficient of Cd=0.26. The development effort, led by chief engineer Shigeyuki Hori, led to 530 patents for the vehicle.

Production commenced in August 2003 at the Tsutsumi plant in Toyota, Aichi, supplemented in October 2004 with the Fujimatsu plant at Kariya, Aichi.

The Prius uses an all-electric A/C compressor for cooling, an industry first. Combined with a smaller and lighter NiMH battery, the XW20 is more powerful and more efficient than the XW10. In the US, the battery pack of 2004 and later models is warrantied for 150,000 miles (240,000 km) or 10 years in states that have adopted the stricter California emissions control standards, and 100,000 miles (160,000 km) or 8 years elsewhere. The warranty for hybrid components is 100,000 miles (160,000 km) or 8 years.

It is classified as a SULEV (Super Ultra Low Emissions Vehicle) and is certified by California Air Resources Board as an "Advanced Technology Partial Zero Emission Vehicle" (AT-PZEV). In 2007, the United States Environmental Protection Agency (EPA) and California Air Resources Board (CARB) rated the Prius as among the cleanest vehicles sold in the United States on the basis of smog-forming emissions.

From 2005 to 2009, the second-generation Prius had been built by FAW Toyota in the city of Changchun for the Chinese market. It was reported that a total of 2,152 Priuses were sold in 2006 and 414 in 2007. The relatively low sales were blamed on a high price, about US$15,000 higher than in Japan or the US, caused by high duties on imported parts. In an attempt to stem the drop in sales, Toyota cut the price of Prius by up to eight percent in March 2008. Toyota sold about 1,192,000-second-generation Priuses worldwide.

== Third generation (XW30; 2009) ==
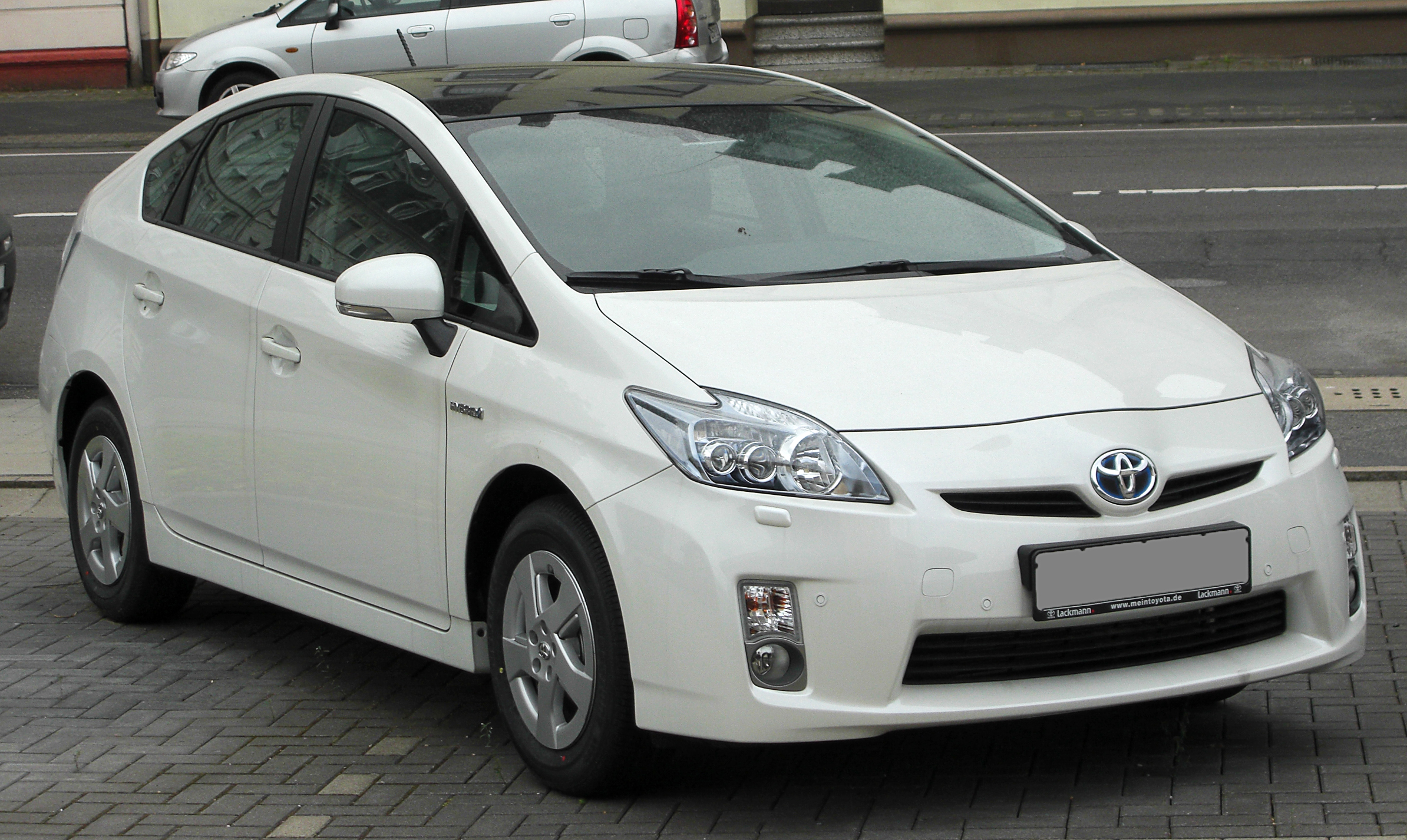
Toyota Prius (third generation)

Toyota debuted the new Prius (2010 US model year) at the January 2009 North American International Auto Show, and sales began in Japan on 18 May 2009. Toyota cut the price of the Prius from ¥2.331 million to ¥2.05 million to better compete with the Honda Insight, leading some to wonder whether increased sales of the Prius might come at the expense of sales of other vehicles with higher margins. Competition from lower priced hybrids, such as the Honda Insight, also made it difficult for Toyota to capitalize on the Prius's success. As of June 2013, Toyota has sold about 1,688,000 third-generation Priuses worldwide.

Among the new standard features of the Prius, Toyota introduced three user-selectable driving modes: EV mode for electric-only low-speed operation, Eco mode for best fuel efficiency, and Power mode for better performance. Optional features included the solar-PV roof panels to help cool the cabin interior in summer heat, Intelligent Parking Assist, Lane Keep Assist, and Dynamic Radar Cruise Control.

Its new body design features a reduced drag coefficient of Cd=0.25. This figure was disputed by General Motors which found the value for the model with 17-inch wheels to be around 0.30 based on tests in GM, Ford, and Chrysler wind tunnels. Car & Driver measured the third-generation Prius at 0.26 in a privately arranged five-way wind-tunnel test of comparable cars. An underbody rear fin helps stabilize the vehicle at higher speeds.

A new front-drive platform underpinned the car, although the wheelbase remained unchanged and overall length grew by a lone centimeter. Aluminium was employed in the bonnet, rear hatch, front axle and brake calipers (disc brakes were finally assigned to all four wheels). The new platform also includes an upgraded 1.8-litre Atkinson-cycle four-cylinder engine, producing 98 hp at 5,200 rpm.

The Prius uses a range of plant-derived ecological bioplastics, using wood or grass-derived cellulose instead of petroleum. The two principal crops used are kenaf and ramie. Kenaf is a member of the hibiscus family, a relative to cotton and okra; ramie, commonly known as China grass, is a member of the nettle family and one of the strongest natural fibres, with a density and absorbency comparable to flax. Toyota said this was a timely breakthrough for plant-based eco-plastics because 2009 was the United Nations' International Year of Natural Fibres, which spotlights kenaf and ramie among others.

In 2011 (for the 2012 model year), the third-generation Prius Liftback received modest style and equipment changes. The exterior changes included updated headlamps, revised tail lamps, and revised front fascia and bumper.

=== Awards ===
At its introduction in 2009, it won the Car of the Year Japan Award for the second time. In December 2013, Consumer Reports named the Prius as the "Best Value", for the second year in a row.

== Fourth generation (XW50; 2015) ==
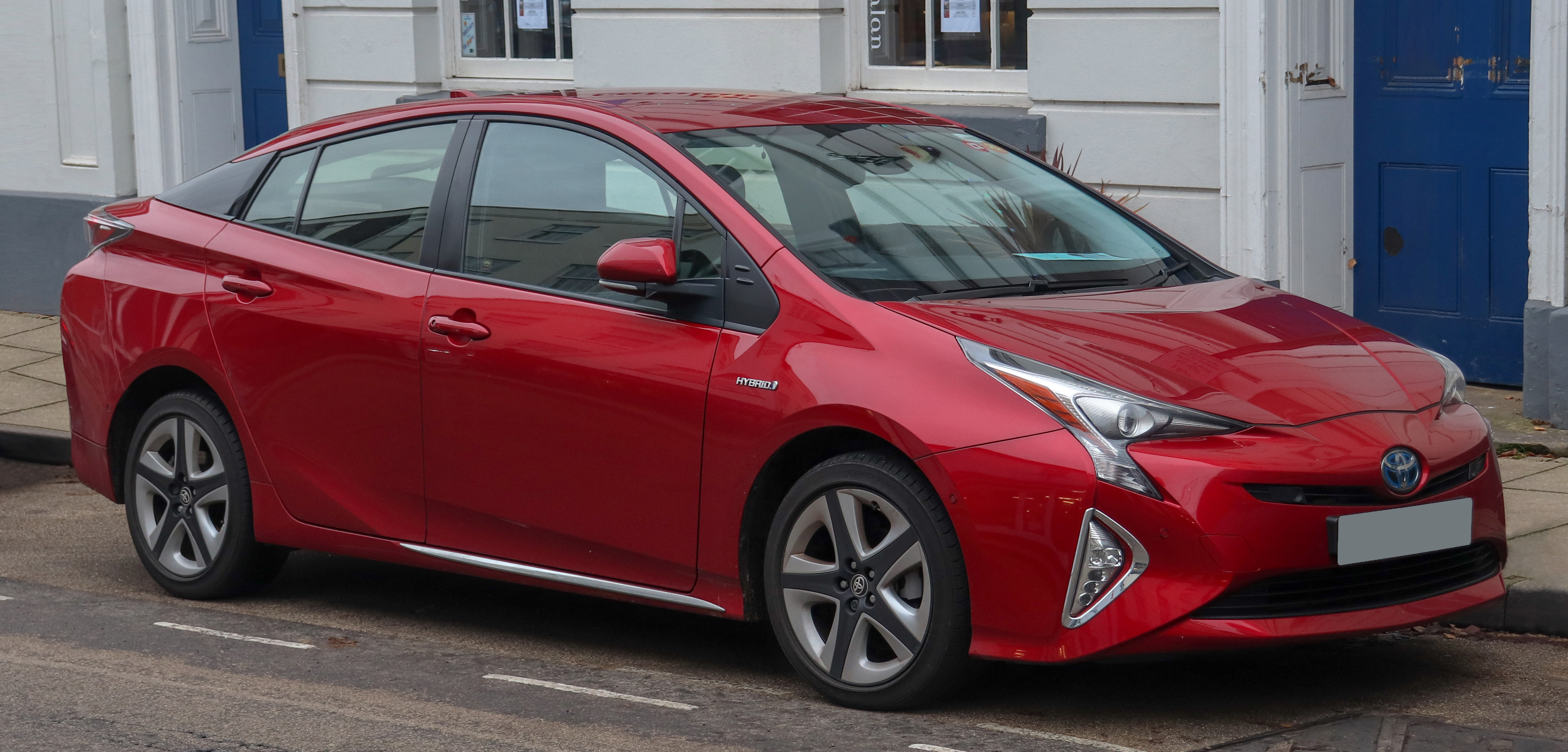
Toyota Prius (fourth generation)

The fourth-generation Prius was first shown during September 2015 in Las Vegas, and was released for retail customers in Japan on 9 December 2015. The launch in the North American market occurred in January 2016, and February in Europe and the Middle East.

In August 2013, Toyota Managing Officer Satoshi Ogiso, who was chief engineer for the Prius line, announced some of the improvements and key features of the next generation Prius. This was the first generation of the Prius to use the Toyota New Global Architecture (TNGA) modular platform, which provides a lower center of gravity and increased structural rigidity. Ogiso also explained that the next-generation Prius plug-in hybrid, the Prius Prime, was developed in parallel with the standard Prius model. This variant became available in late 2016, featuring a reduced 4-seat capacity. In a mid-generation update, the 2020 Prius Prime restored the 5-seat capacity.

The 2018 model year Prius Eco ranked as the second-most-fuel-efficient petrol-powered car without plug-in capability available in the US that year, following the Hyundai Ioniq Blue hybrid.

=== 2018 facelift ===
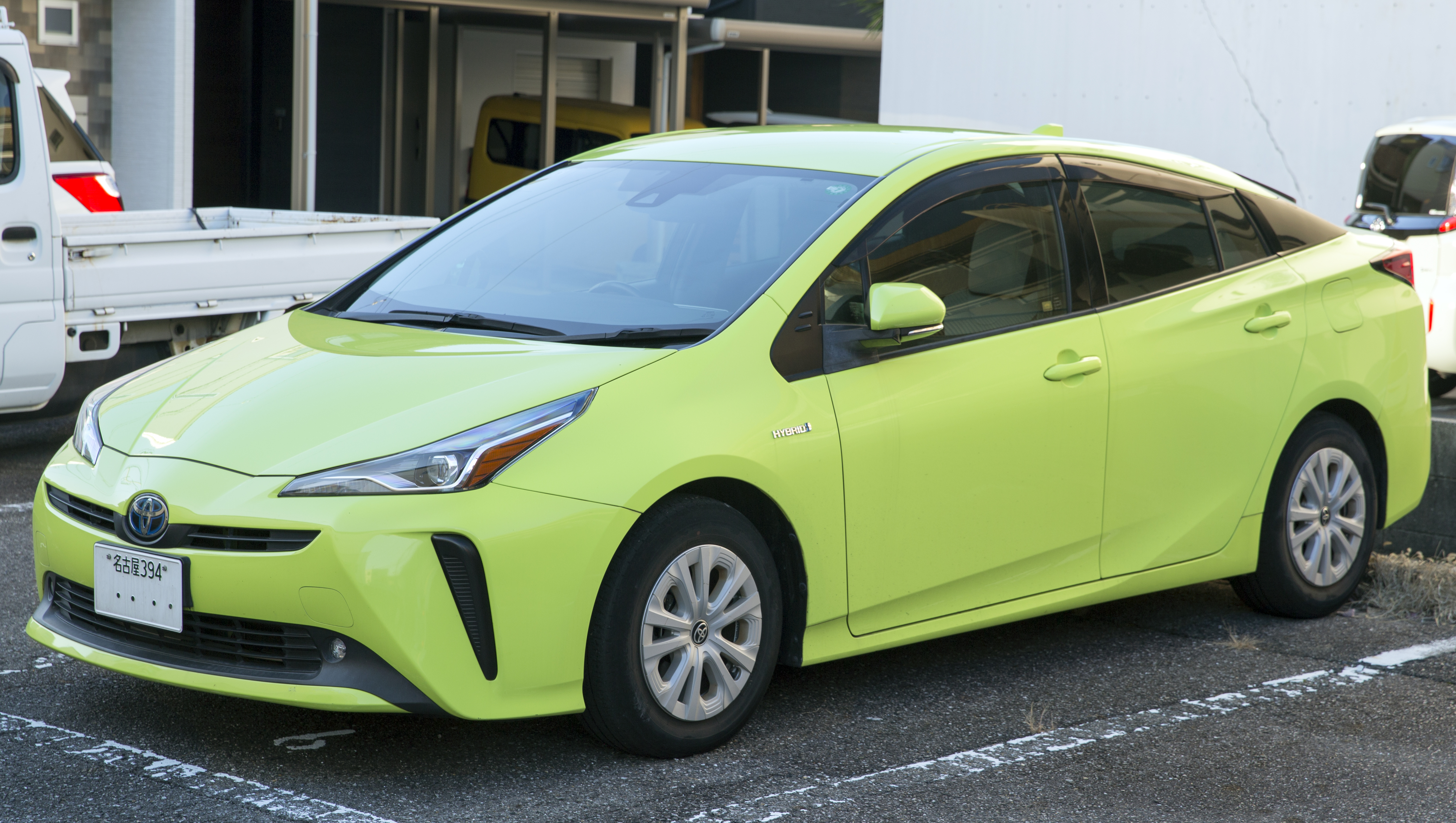
Prius (fourth generation; facelift)

In late November 2018, for the 2019 model year, the US market Prius lineup introduced an all-wheel drive model featuring Toyota's E-Four system. This has been available for the Japanese market Prius since 2015 and the hybrid versions of the RAV4 and Lexus NX. Also, the Prius received a facelift with redesigned headlights and tail lights, which was released in Japan on 17 December 2018.

In 2021, for the 2022 model year, Toyota released the Nightshade Edition in the US. Like other Nightshade models, it added black paint to exterior trim pieces. It was available in FWD or AWD-e powertrain and in three exterior colours.

== Fifth generation (XW60; 2022) ==
Fifth generation
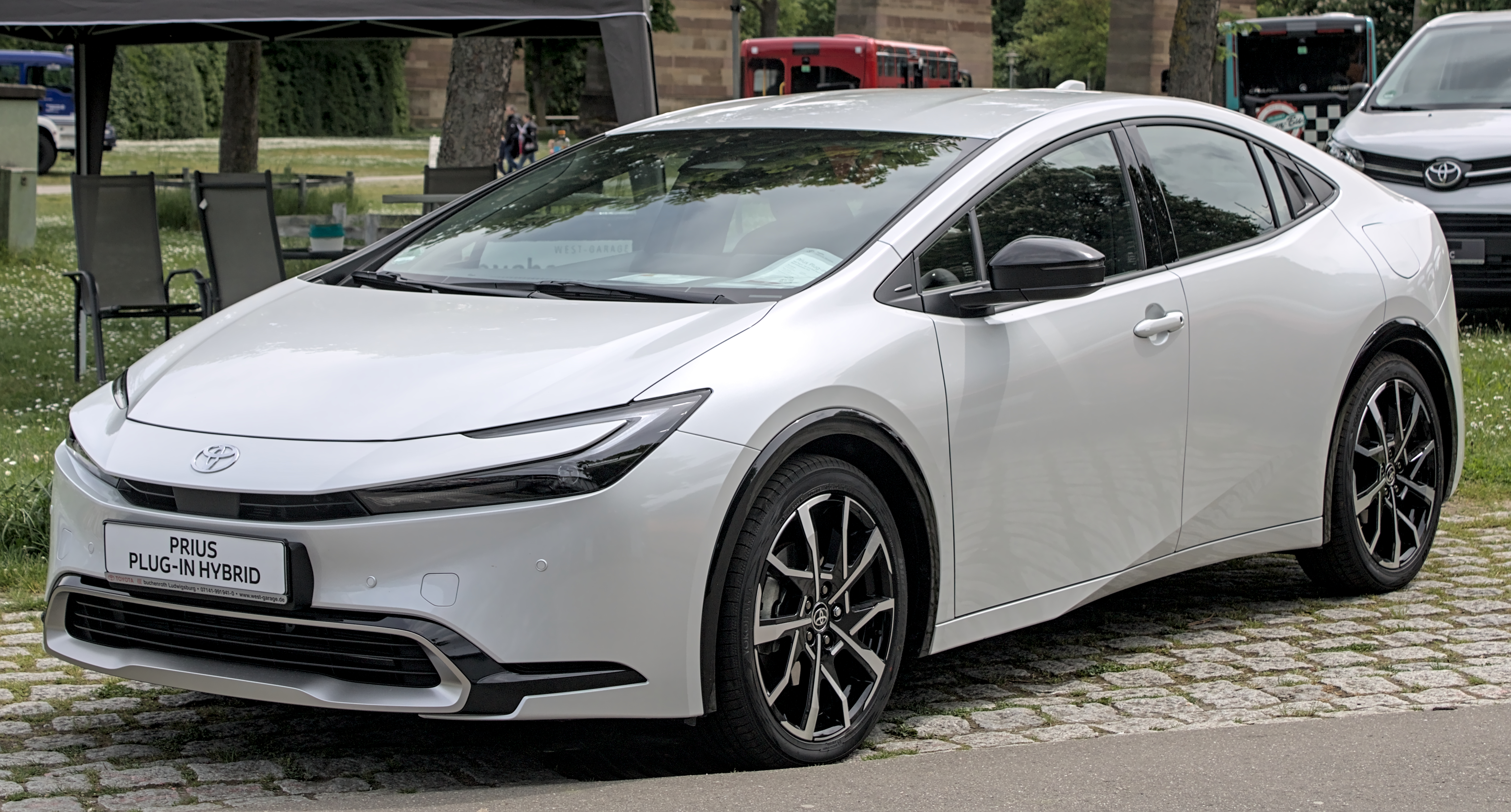
- Prius Plug-in Hybrid

Overview
- Model code: XW60
- Production: December 2022 – present
- Model years: 2023–present (North America)
- Assembly: Japan: Toyota, Aichi (Tsutsumi plant)
- Designer: Yuji Fujiwara (project chief designer); Manabu Hirokawa, Hideaki Iida and Mario Majdandžić (exterior); Tsuyoshi Oba and Yuta Nozaki (interior)

Body and chassis
- Layout: Front-engine, front-wheel-drive; Front-engine, four-wheel-drive (E-Four)
- Platform: TNGA: GA-C
- Related: Toyota Prius Plug-in Hybrid/Prime (XW60); Toyota C-HR (AX20)

Powertrain
- Engine: Petrol hybrid: 1.8 L 2ZR-FXE I4 (ZVW60/65); 2.0 L M20A-FXS I4 (MXWH60/65)
- Electric motor: AC synchronous; 1VM (front); 1WM (rear)
- Power output: 72 kW (97 hp; 98 PS) (2ZR-FXE, petrol engine only); 103 kW (138 hp; 140 PS) (2ZR-FXE, combined system output); 112 kW (150 hp; 152 PS) (M20A-FXS, petrol engine only); 144–146 kW (193–196 hp; 196–199 PS) (M20A-FXS, combined system output); 70–83 kW (94–111 hp; 95–113 PS) (1VM motor); 30 kW (40 hp; 41 PS) (1WM motor)
- Transmission: eCVT
- Hybrid drivetrain: Power-split
- Battery: 4.08 Ah lithium-ion

Dimensions
- Wheelbase: 2,750 mm (108.3 in)
- Length: 4,600 mm (181.1 in)
- Width: 1,780 mm (70.1 in)
- Height: 1,420–1,430 mm (55.9–56.3 in)
- Curb weight: 1,350–1,480 kg (2,976–3,263 lb)

Chronology
- Predecessor: Toyota Prius (XW50)

The fifth-generation Prius was presented on 16 November 2022, with two powertrain options announced for the Japanese market. This generation of Prius is available in 1.8-litre (2ZR-FXE) and 2.0-litre (M20A-FXS) variants, which can produce up to 103 kW (138 hp; 140 PS) and 144 or 146 kW (193 or 196 hp; 196 or 199 PS), respectively. This model is also available with E-Four all-wheel drive system. The second, a plug-in hybrid, combines a 2.0-litre M20A-FXS engine, an electric motor and lithium-ion batteries to produce a combined output of 164 kW (220 hp; 223 PS).

The new design has a higher drag coefficient of Cd=0.27 but it has a lower frontal area, and a smaller cargo volume than before.

In Europe, deliveries began in the first quarter of 2023, with only the plug-in hybrid model being available.

Unlike previous generations, this generation was not sold in Australia due to sluggish sales with the previous generation. It was replaced by a shorter Corolla Hatchback Hybrid. Toyota New Zealand also decided not to offer the new generation Prius initially, but have resumed sales in 2024 under their Signature Class imported vehicle program.

In October 2023, Toyota reversed its initial decision not to sell the fifth-generation Prius in the UK.

In 2024, for the 2025 model year, the Prime model was renamed to Plug-in Hybrid for the North American market.

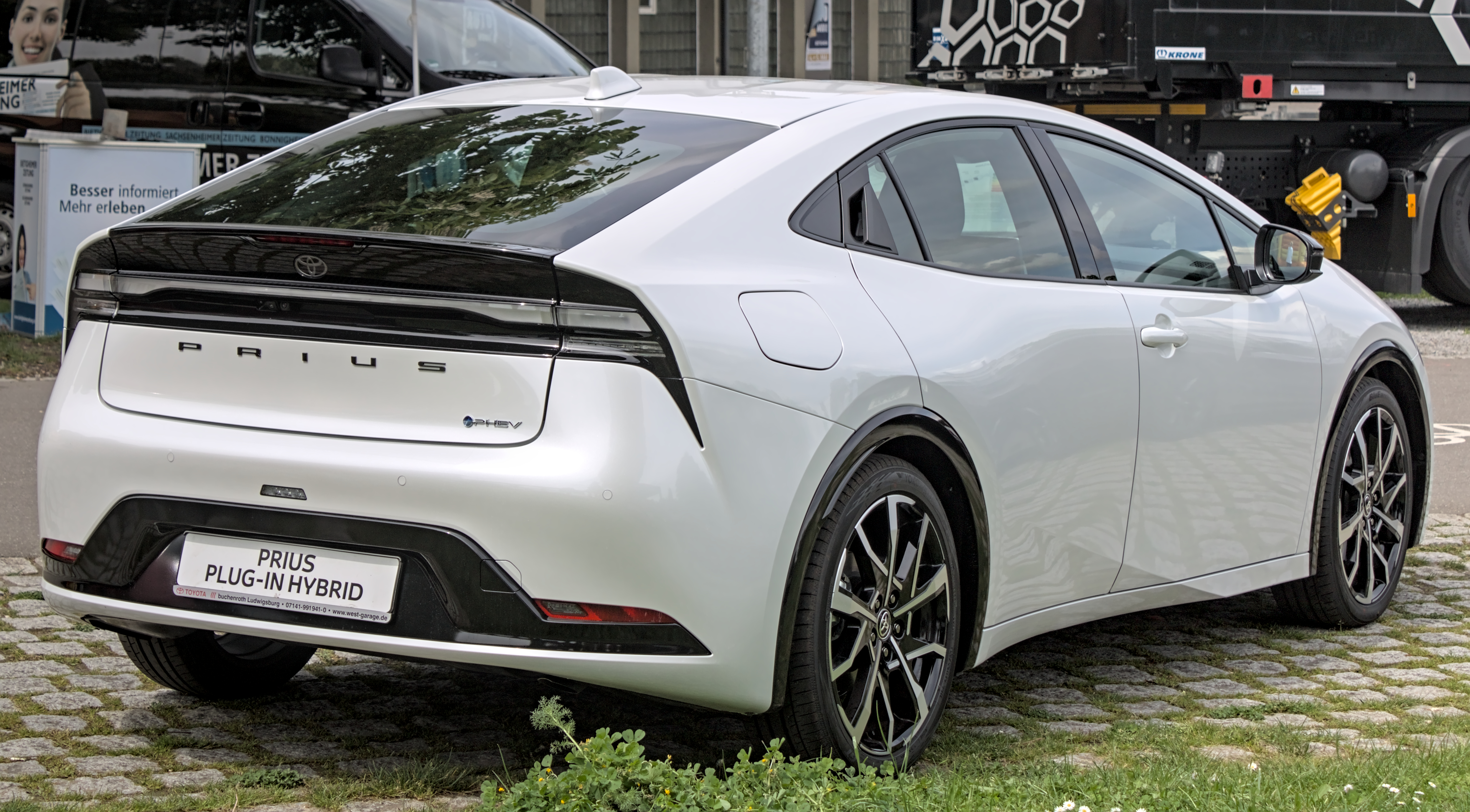
Rear view

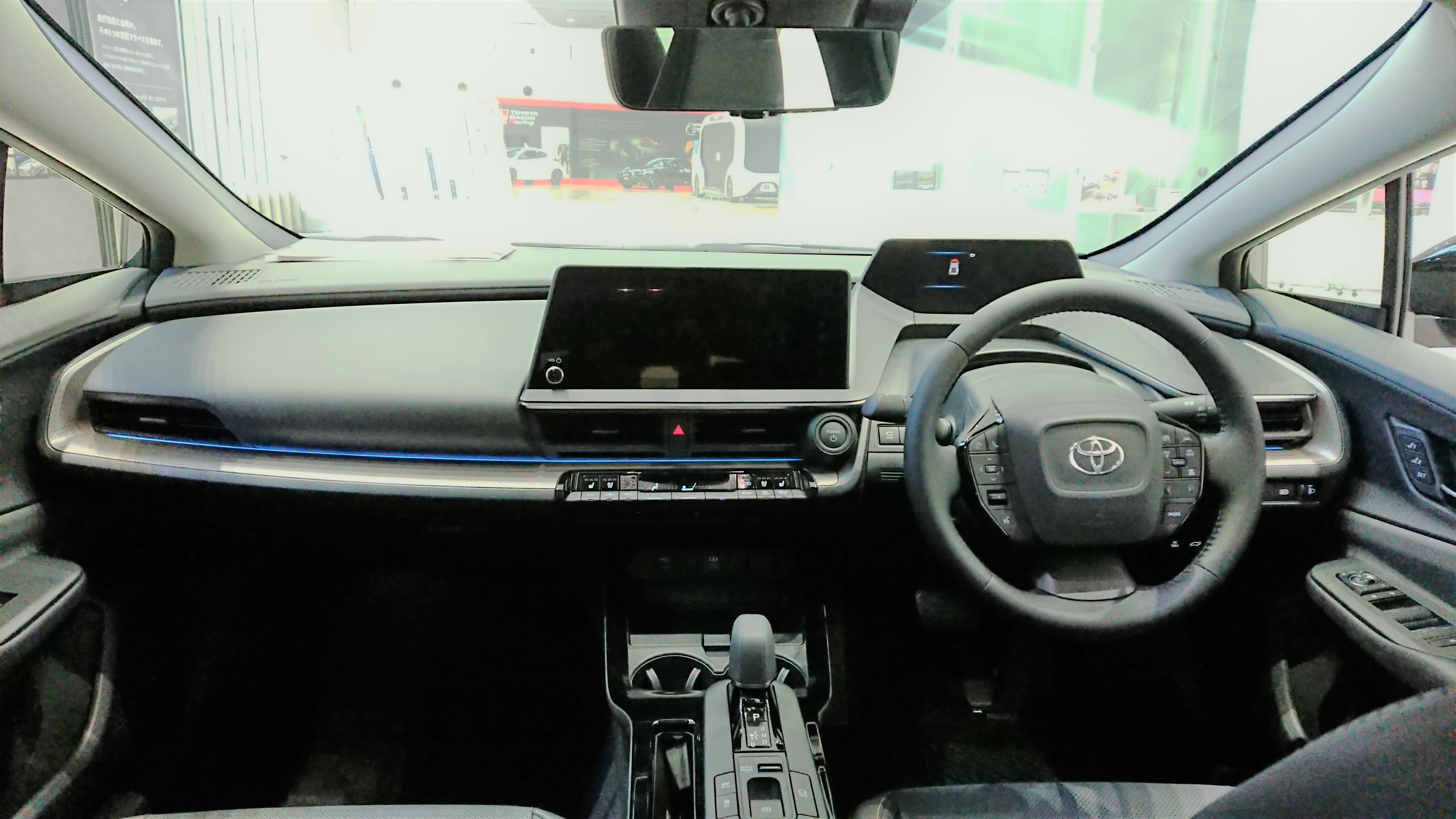
Interior

=== Markets ===
==== Japan ====
In Japan, the Prius went on sale on 10 January 2023. The Prius trims offered are X, U, G, and Z; the former two are equipped with the 2ZR-FXE engine, and the latter two equipped with the M20A-FXS engine.

==== United States ====
The United States market Prius is available in three trims: LE, XLE, and Limited. All trims are powered with the M20A-FXS engine; AWD is optional on all. In 2024, for the 2025 model year, the Nightshade trim was added, based on the XLE trim.

==== Canada ====
The Canadian market Prius is available in two trims: XLE and Limited. Both are powered with the M20A-FXS engine. Unlike the United States market, Toyota Canada elected to exclusively offer the electronic on-demand all-wheel-drive (E-Four) system across all trims, omitting front-wheel-drive configurations entirely to better suit harsh winter conditions. Additionally, both Canadian trims include cold-weather specific equipment as standard, such as a windshield wiper de-icer, heated steering wheel, and supplemental cabin heating.

==== Indonesia ====
The Prius was previewed at the 30th Gaikindo Indonesia International Auto Show on 10 August 2023, and launched at the 31st Gaikindo Indonesia International Auto Show on 17 July 2024. Only the hybrid variant is sold in Indonesia, and only by special order.

==== South Korea ====
The South Korean market Prius went on sale on 13 December 2023. All variants are powered by the M20A-FXS engine. Similar to North America, the hybrid variant is available in LE and XLE trims, while the PHEV variant is available in SE and XSE trims. Ambient lighting is standard on XLE HEV and XSE PHEV trims.

=== Safety ===
The Prius holds the 2023 IIHS Top Safety Pick+.

IIHS scores: 2023 Toyota Prius
Small overlap front (driver)	Good
Small overlap front (passenger)	Good
Moderate overlap front	Good
Side impact	Good
Front crash prevention: vehicle-to-pedestrian (Day)	Superior
Front crash prevention: vehicle-to-pedestrian (Night)	Superior
Headlights	Acceptable
Seat belt reminders	Good
Child seat anchors (LATCH) ease of use	Good+

=== Awards ===
- US: Japan Car of the Year award for 2023-2024.
- US: Kelley Blue Book Best New Model Award 2024.
- US: 2024 MotorTrend Car of the Year.
- US: 2024 North American Car of the Year.
- US: The Drive's Best Car of 2023.
- US: MotorWeek's Drivers’ Choice Awards for Best Family Car of 2023.
- US: Car and Driver's recipient of the 10 Best in 2024.
- US: 2024 Green Car of the Year (Prius Prime).
- US: Edmunds' Top Rated Car of 2024 Award.
- Canada: 2024 Canadian Car of the Year Award.
- 2024 World Car Design of the Year

=== Recall ===
In April 2024, Toyota issued a recall affecting 211,000 2023 and 2024 model year Prius and Prius Prime units worldwide where the rear doors can open unexpectedly if not locked due to a short circuit on the electronic rear door latches when the car is moving or involved in a collision. The issue was that water could possibly short circuit the door lock. The issue has now been resolved, remaining vehicles that do not have new switches are replaced at US port of entry for vehicles shipped overseas.

== Prius family ==
=== Prius Plug-in Hybrid ===
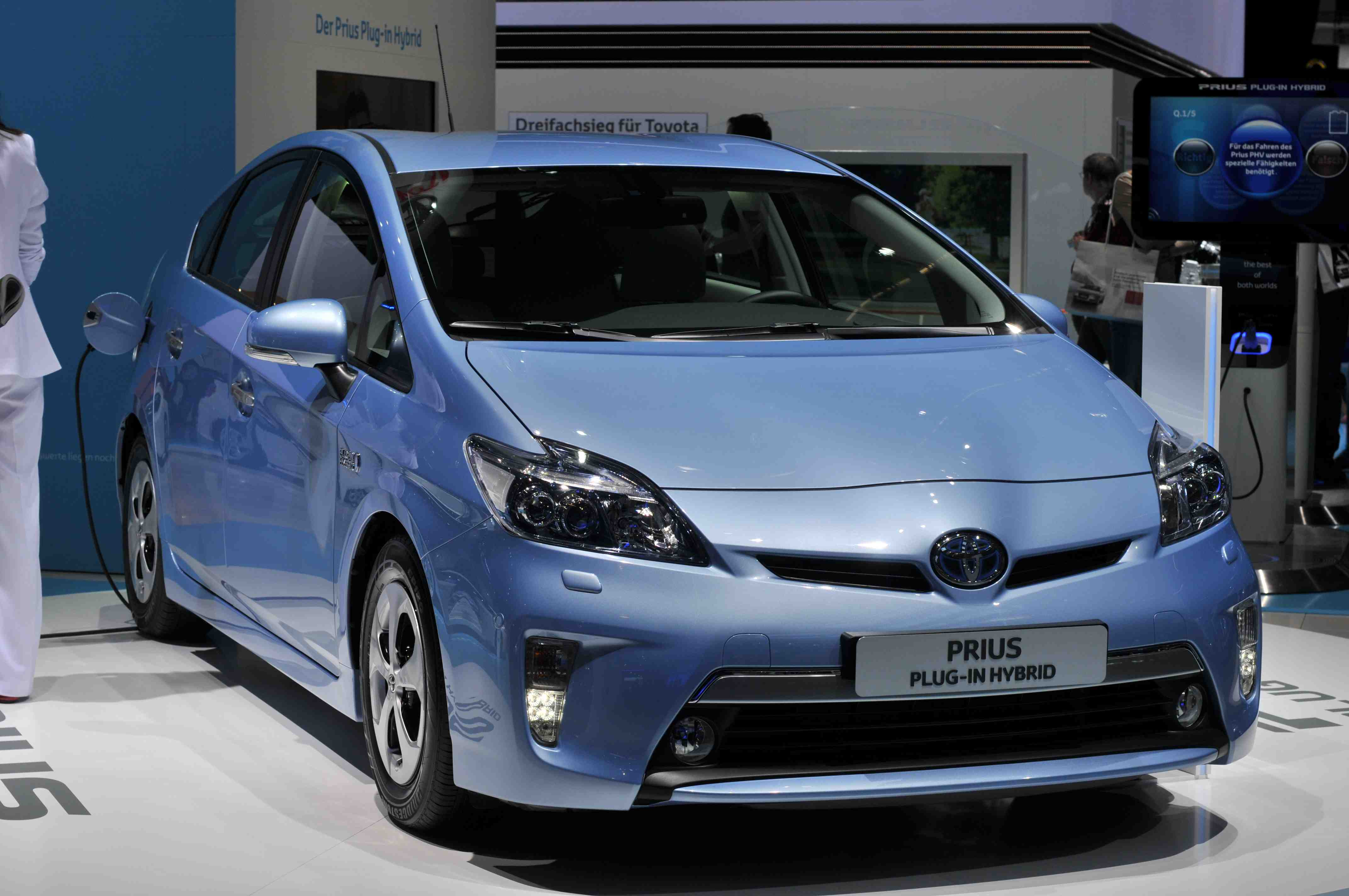
Toyota Prius Plug-in Hybrid (first generation)

The Prius Plug-in Hybrid (ZVW35) is based on the conventional third generation (ZVW30) with a 4.4 kWh lithium-ion battery that allows an all-electric range of 18 km (11 miles). A global demonstration program involving 600 pre-production test cars began in late 2009 and took place in Japan, Europe, Canada, China, Australia, New Zealand and the United States.

The production version was unveiled at the September 2011 Frankfurt Motor Show. Deliveries began in Japan in late January 2012, followed by a limited roll-out in the US in late February. Deliveries began in Europe in June 2012 and in the UK in August 2012.

=== Prius Prime ===
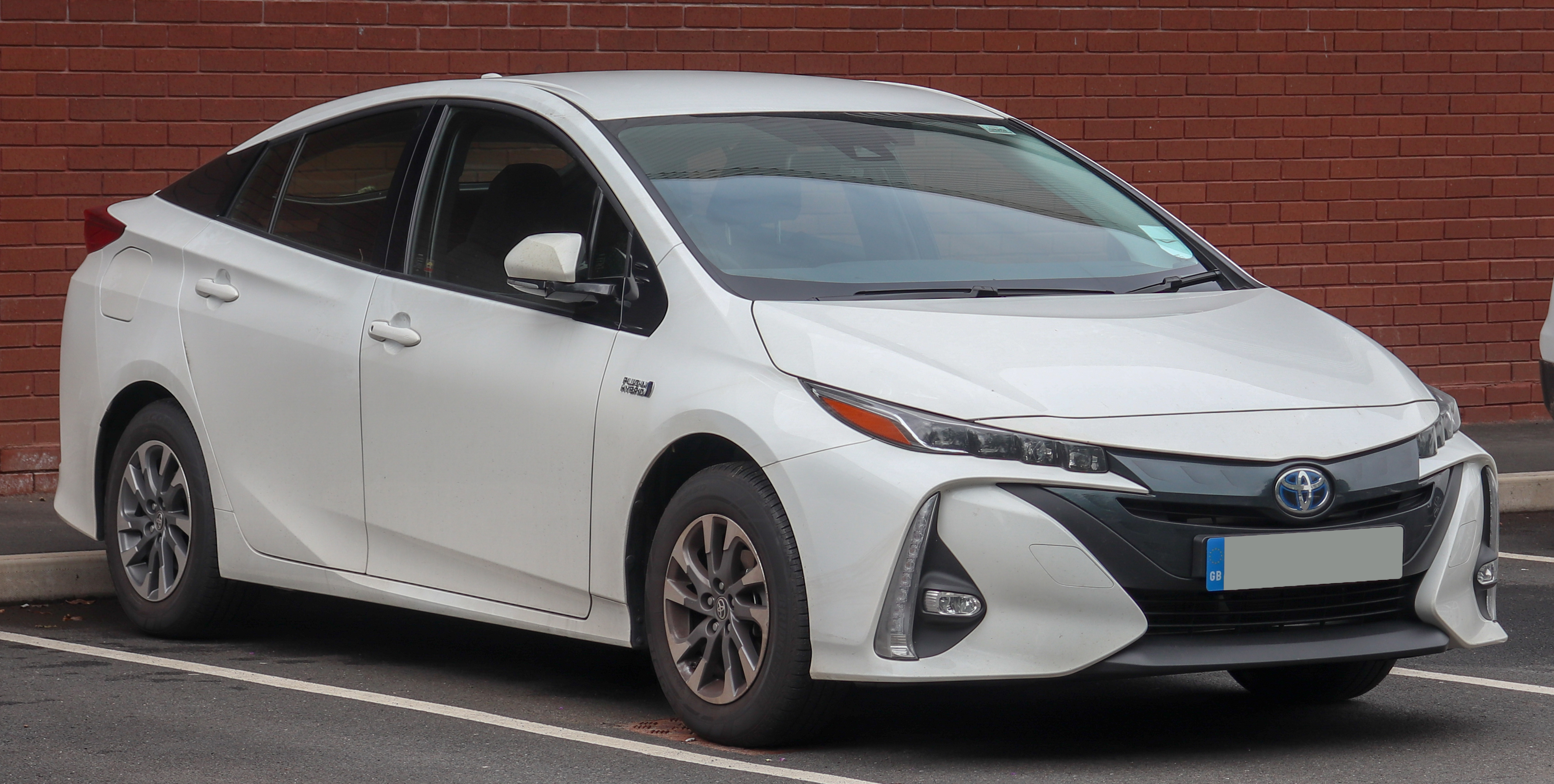
Toyota Prius Prime

The second generation of the plug-in hybrid version of the Prius, called Toyota Prius Prime in the US and Prius PHV in Japan, was developed in parallel with the standard fourth generation Prius model (XW50) released in December 2015. The model was released to retail customers in the US in November 2016, followed by Japan in February 2017. In the American market, unlike the first generation model, the Prius Prime is available in all 50 states.

=== Prius v ===
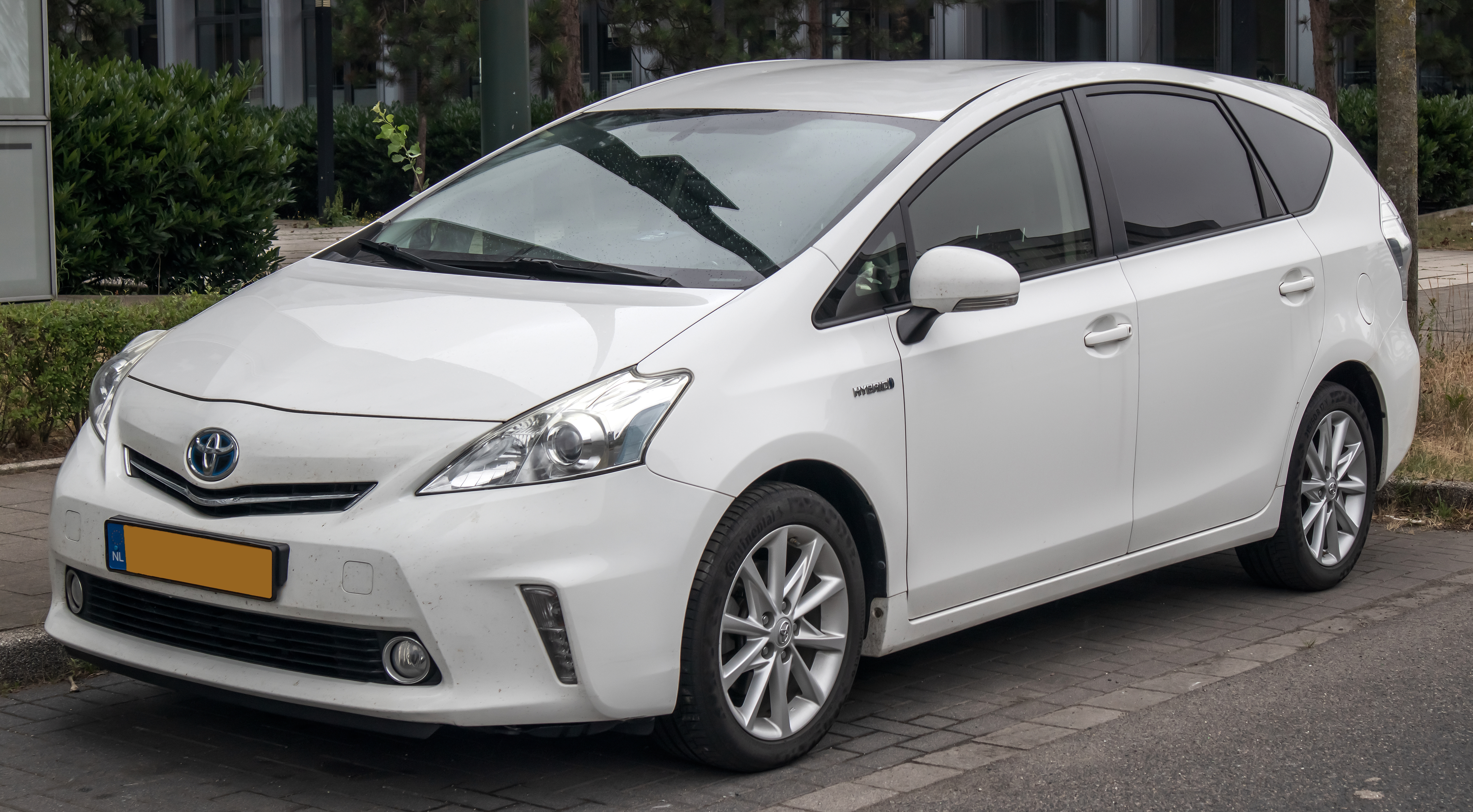
2012 Prius v

At the January 2011 North American International Auto Show, Toyota revealed the 2012 model year Prius v, an MPV, which is derived from the third-generation Prius and features over 50 percent more interior cargo space than the original Prius design.

In May 2011, Toyota introduced the Prius α (alpha) in Japan, which is available in a five-seat, two-row model and a seven-seat, three-row model, the latter's third row enabled by a space-saving lithium-ion drive battery in the center console. The five-seat model uses a NiMH battery pack. The Alpha is the basis for the five-seat Prius v launched in North America in October 2011 with a nickel-metal hydride battery pack similar to the 2010 model year Prius, and with two rows of seats to accommodate five passengers. The European and Japanese versions are offered with a lithium-ion battery, with three rows of seats with accommodations for seven passengers. The seven passenger seating on the Prius v is not available on North American Prius v models. The European version, named Prius+ (plus), began deliveries in June 2012. US sales ended in 2017. Japanese production ended in March 2021.

=== Prius c ===
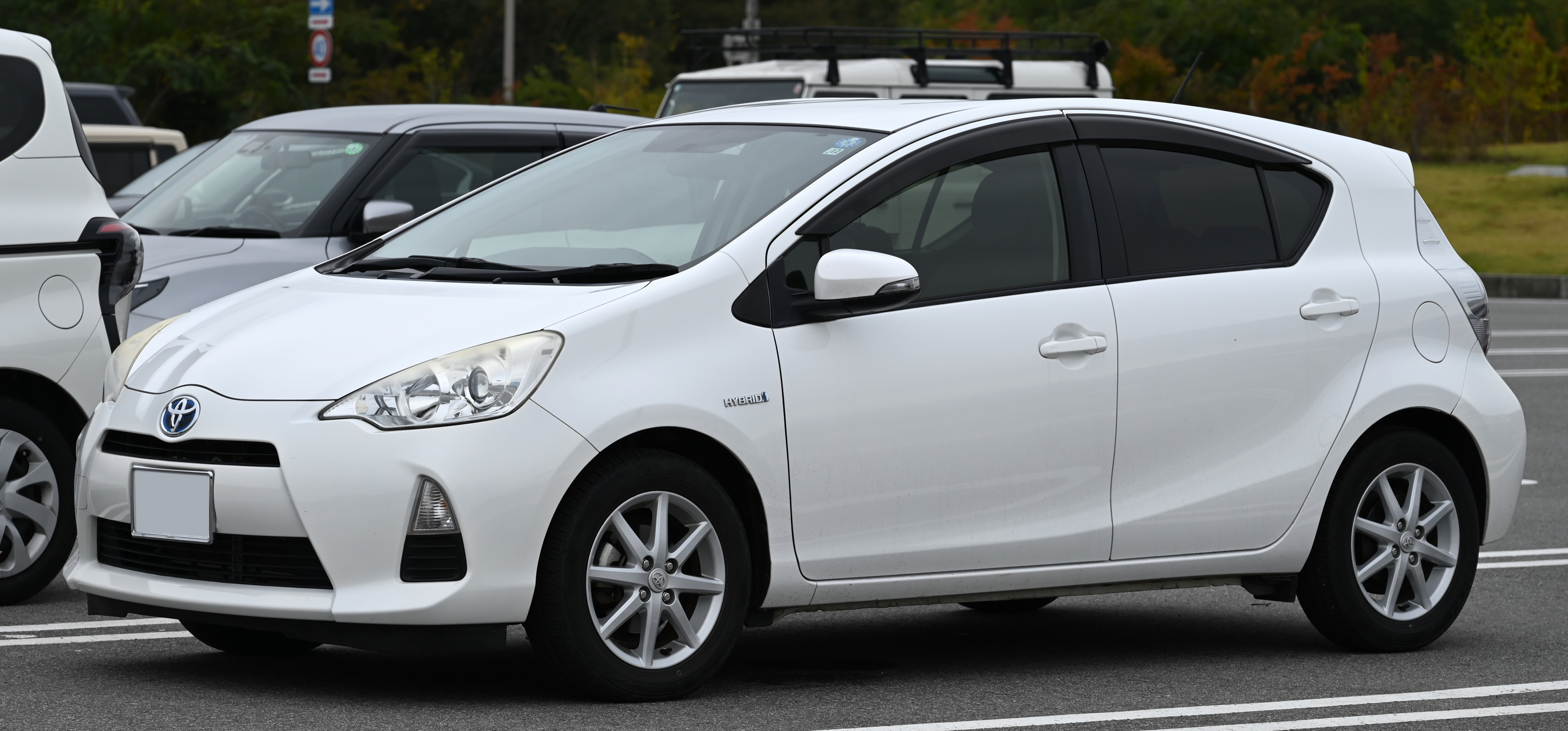
Prius c

Toyota unveiled the Prius c concept at the January 2011 North American International Auto Show. The Prius c has a lower list price and is smaller than the previous Prius liftback. The production version was unveiled at the 2011 Tokyo Motor Show as the Toyota Aqua, and was launched in Japan in December 2011. The Prius c was released in the US and Canada in March 2012, and in April 2012 in Australia and New Zealand. The Prius c is not available in Europe, where instead, Toyota is selling the Toyota Yaris Hybrid since June 2012. The Prius c and the Yaris Hybrid share the same powertrain.

== Sales ==
=== Overview ===
Global cumulative sales of the Prius liftback crossed 1 million vehicles in May 2008. Toyota reached that milestone in the United States by April 2011, and in Japan by August 2011. As of September 2022, Prius is the world's best-selling hybrid car, with over 5 million units sold.

As of January 2017, the Prius is sold in over 90 countries and regions. Worldwide cumulative sales exceeded 2 million units in September 2010, and reached 3 million in June 2013. As of January 2017, global sales of the Prius family totaled almost 6.1 million units representing 61% of the 10 million hybrids delivered by Toyota Motor Company (TMC) worldwide, including the Lexus brand. Sales of the Prius family are led by the Prius liftback, with 4 million units, followed by the Aqua/Prius c with 1.4 million, the Prius +/v/α with 615 thousand and the Prius Plug-in Hybrid with 79 thousand units.

As of April 2011, the US accounted for almost half of Prius liftback global sales, with 1 million Priuses sold since 2000. The Prius experienced two consecutive years of sales declines from 2007 peak, falling to 139,682 units in 2009 before rebounding to 140,928 units in 2010. As of January 2017, sales of the Prius liftback totaled over 1.8 million units in Japan and 1.8 million in the US, and ranked as the all-time best-selling hybrid car in both countries.

=== Early growth (2009-2012) ===
The Prius became Japan's best-selling vehicle in 2009 and held that position for four consecutive years through 2012, helped by the 2011 launches of the Prius α and Toyota Aqua subcompact hybrid, and rising oil prices due to Arab Spring protests. Cumulative European sales passed 200,000 units by mid-2010, with the United Kingdom accounting for a fifth of sales. Rising fuel prices and a redesigned third-generation model drove record sales in the US, with Prius models becoming the best-selling vehicle in California in 2012 and 2013.

The Prius plug-in hybrid was the second-best-selling plug-in electric car in the US in 2012, behind Chevrolet Volt. Since its inception in 1999, Toyota sold 1.5 million Prius family vehicles in the US by mid-October 2013, representing a 50.1% market share of total hybrid sales in the country. Of these, ~1.36 million were conventional Prius liftbacks sold through September 2013. US Prius sales have declined every year since their 2012 peak, due to competition from other hybrid cars and electric vehicles.

=== Later trends (2013-present) ===
Prius sales continued to decline through the late 2010s and early 2020s in all major markets; however, sales picked up in 2023, nearly tripling in Japan, increasing in the US and Europe, and continuing to rise through 2025 (see table below).

==== Liftback sales ====
Calendar year	Annual Prius liftback sales worldwide and by region (in thousands)					
Calendar year	World	Japan	US	Europe (Note: Toyota Motor Europe: Europe including Russia and Turkey + Armenia, Georgia, Azerbaijan, Kazakhstan and Israel)	Canada	Other
1997	0.3	0.3				
1998	17.7	17.7				
1999	15.2	15.2				
2000	19.0	12.5	5.6	0.7	0.2	0.01
2001	29.5	11.0	15.6	2.3	0.4	0.2
2002	28.1	6.7	20.1	0.8	0.2	0.2
2003	43.2	17.0	24.6	0.9	0.3	0.4
2004	125.7	59.8	54.0	8.1	1.9	1.9
2005	175.2	43.7	107.9	18.8	2.0	2.9
2006	185.6	48.6	107.0	22.8	2.0	5.3
2007	281.3	58.3	181.2	32.2	2.6	7.0
2008	285.7	73.1	158.6	41.5	4.5	7.7
2009	404.2	208.9	139.7	42.6	4.6	8.4
2010	509.4	315.4	140.9	42.0	3.0	8.1
2011	368.4	197.4	128.1	24.9	1.6	16.6
2012	362.8	176.9	147.5	19.4	3.4	15.7
2013	315.5	145.2	145.2	11.6	2.1	11.3
2014	242.0	101.9	122.8	6.7	1.8	8.8
2015	203.3	73.9	113.8	6.8	1.6	7.1
2016	354.5	248.2	98.8	17.1	2.9	3.0
2017		160.9	65.6	12.2	1.1	
2018		115.5	87.5	10.1		
2019		125.6	69.7	5.3	2.0	
2020		67.3	43.5	3.2		
2021		49.2	59.0	3.1		
2022		32.7	36.9	1.6		
2023		99.1	38.1	2.7		
2024		83.5	44.7	3.1		
2025			56.5	3.1		

==== Non-liftback sales ====
The following table presents retail sales of the other vehicles of the Prius family by year since deliveries began in 2011 through December 2016.

Annual sales of other Prius family vehicles by year between 2011 and December 2016
Year	Total	Toyota Prius v/α/+	Toyota Aqua/Prius c^{(2)}	Toyota Prius PHV
2011	64,660	64,299	361	
2012	529,674	186,989	315,406	27,279
2013	493,104	153,832	317,891	21,381
2014	419,393	117,647	281,867	19,879
2015	358,992	91,913	260,572	6,507
2016	249,388	53,000	194,000	2,388
Total by model^{(1)}	2,116,865	668,494	1,370,937	77,434
Notes: (1) Global cumulative sales for the Prius nameplate, when the Prius liftback is included, adds up to 6.115 million units through December 2016. (2) Not available in Europe, instead, Toyota is selling the Toyota Yaris Hybrid which shares the same powertrain as the Prius c. A total of 302,700 Yaris Hybrids have been sold through December 2016.

== Design and technology ==
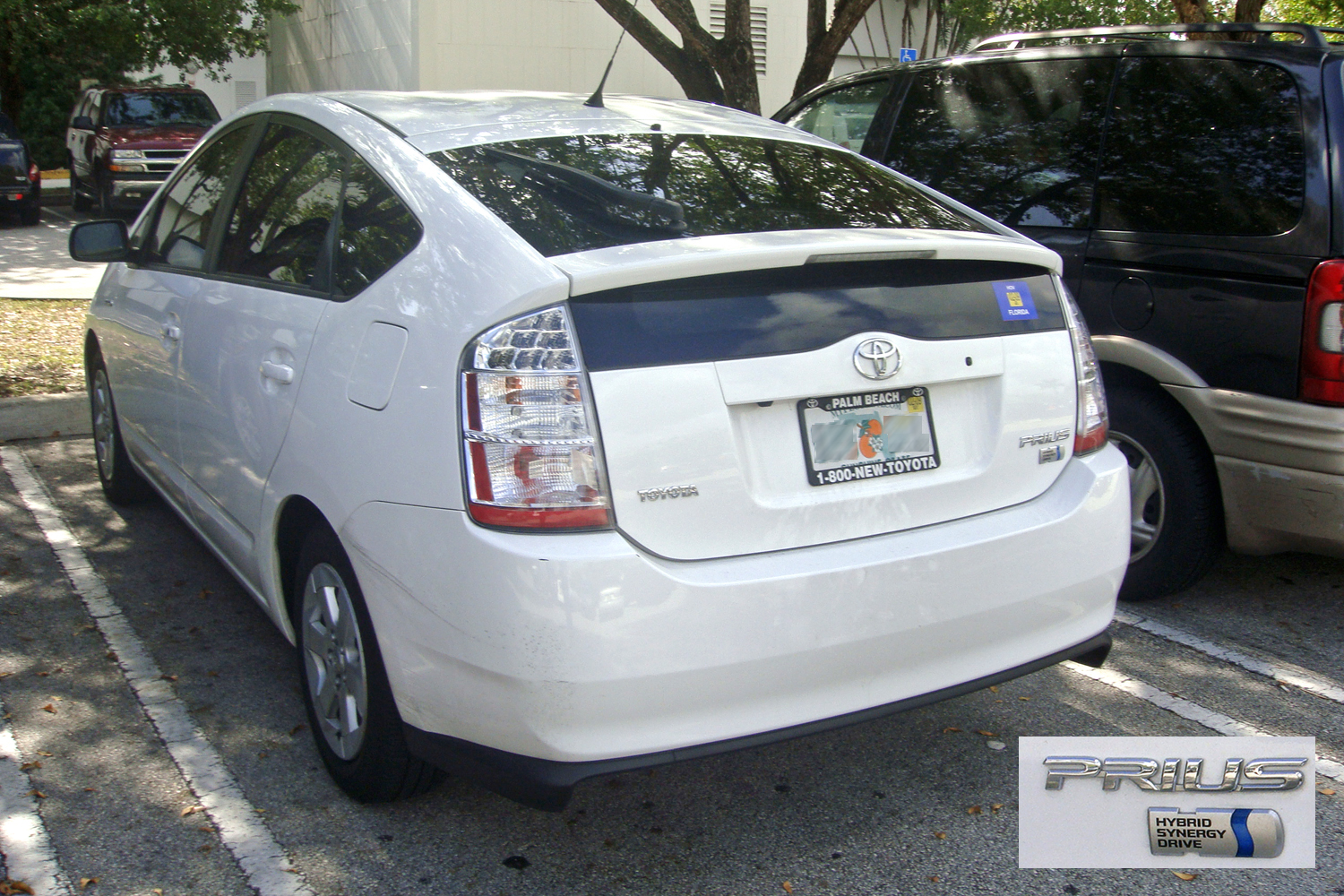
The Toyota Prius Hybrid Synergy Drive is a series-parallel full hybrid, sometimes referred to as a combined hybrid.

The Prius is a power-split or series-parallel (full) hybrid, sometimes referred to as a combined hybrid, a vehicle that can be propelled by petrol or electric power or both. Wind resistance is reduced by a drag coefficient of Cd=0.25 (0.29 for 2000 model) with a Kammback design to reduce air resistance. Lower rolling-resistance tyres are used to reduce road friction. An electric water pump eliminates serpentine belts. In the US and Canada, a vacuum flask is used to store hot coolant when the vehicle is powered off for reuse so as to reduce warm-up time. The Prius engine makes use of the Atkinson cycle.

=== EV mode ===
When the vehicle is turned on with the "Power" button, it is ready to drive immediately with the electric motor. In the North American second generation Prius, electric pumps warm the engine by pumping previously saved hot engine coolant from a coolant thermos before the internal combustion engine is started. The delay between powering the car on and starting the internal combustion engine is a few seconds. The third generation Prius does not have a coolant thermos. Instead, the engine is heated by recapturing exhaust heat. A button labelled "EV" maintains Electric Vehicle mode after being powered on and under most low-load conditions at less than 25 mph (40 km/h). This permits driving with low noise and no fuel consumption for journeys under 0.5 miles (0.80 km), Longer journeys are possible as long as the speed is kept below 25 mph (40 km/h), acceleration is kept low and the battery has enough charge. The engine starts automatically when the battery starts to run low. Prior to the 2010 model, the North American model did not have the "EV" button, although one can be added to enable the "EV" mode supported internally by the Prius Hybrid Vehicle management computer. For the North American market, the third generation can remain in EV mode until 70 km/h (43 mph) depending on throttle and road gradient.

=== Batteries ===
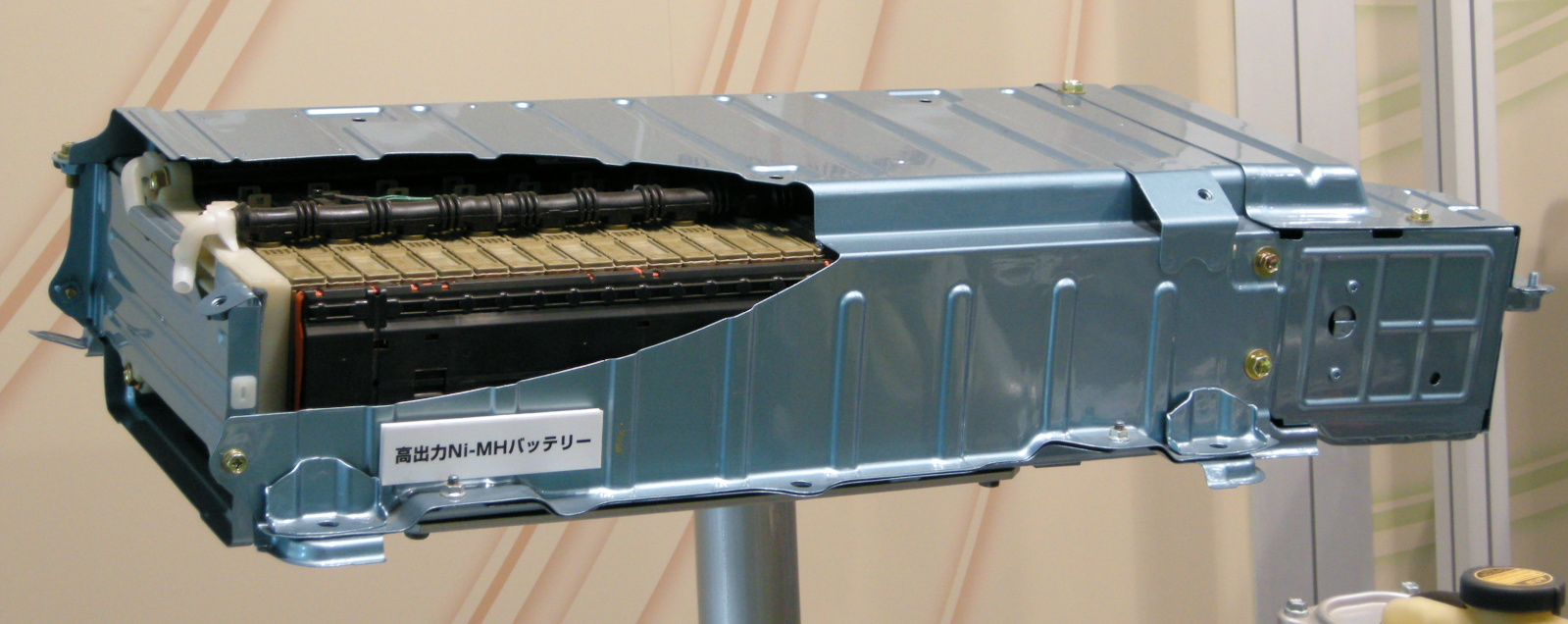
Battery pack from the second generation Prius

There are two batteries: the high voltage (HV) battery pack, also known as the traction battery, and a 12-volt battery known as the low voltage (LV) battery. The traction battery of the first generation Prius update (2000 onwards) was a sealed 38-module nickel metal hydride (NiMH) battery pack with a capacity of 1.78 kWh at a voltage of 273.6 V, and weighing 53.3 kg (118 lb) and is supplied by Japan's Panasonic EV Energy Co. They are normally charged between 40 and 60% of maximum capacity to prolong battery life as well as allow headroom for regenerative braking. Each battery pack uses 10–15 kg (22–33 lb) of lanthanum, and each Prius electric motor contains 1 kg (2 lb) of neodymium; production of the car has been described as "the biggest user of rare earths of any object in the world." The LV battery provides power to the computer and various accessories such as wiper motors, headlights etc.

The Second Generation Prius contains a 1.31 kWh battery, composed of 28 modules. Each battery module is made of six individual 1.2 V 6.5 Ah Prismatic NiMH cells in series forming a 7.2 V 6.5 Ah module with 46 Wh/kg energy density and 1.3 kW/kg output power density. Each module contains an integrated charge controller and relay. These modules are connected 28 in series to form a 201.6 V 6.5 Ah battery (traction battery), also known as the energy storage system. The computer-controlled charge controller and battery management computer systems keep this battery between 38% and 82% state of charge, with a tendency to keep the average state of charge around 60%. By shallow cycling the battery, only a small portion of its net available energy storage capacity is available for use (approximately 400 Wh) by the hybrid drive system, but the shallow computer-controlled cycling dramatically improves the cycle life, thermal management control, and net long term calendar life of the battery. Active cooling of this battery is achieved by a blower motor and air ducting, while passive thermal management was accomplished through the metal case design.

=== Battery life cycle ===
As the Prius reached ten years of being available in the US market, in February 2011 Consumer Reports examined the lifetime and replacement cost of the Prius battery. The magazine tested a 2002 Toyota Prius with over 320,000 km (200,000 miles) on it and compared the results to the nearly identical 2001 Prius with 3,200 km (2,000 miles) tested by Consumer Reports 10 years before. The comparison showed little difference in performance when tested for fuel economy and acceleration. Overall fuel economy of the 2001 model was 40.6 miles per US gallon (5.79 L/100 km; 48.8 mpg_{‑imp}) while the 2002 Prius with high mileage delivered 40.4 miles per US gallon (5.82 L/100 km; 48.5 mpg_{‑imp}). The magazine concluded that the effectiveness of the battery has not degraded over the long run. The cost of replacing the first generation battery varies between US$2,200 and US$2,600 from a Toyota dealer, but low-use units from salvage yards are available for around US$500. One study indicates it may be worthwhile to rebuild batteries using good blades from defective used batteries.

=== Air conditioning (HVAC) ===
The HVAC system uses an AC induction motor to drive a sealed-system scroll compressor, a design principle not usually used in automotive applications. Using a scroll compressor increases the efficiency of the system while driving it with an AC induction motor makes the system more flexible, so the AC can run while the engine is off. Because the oil used with the refrigerant gas also flows in the area of the high-voltage motor-windings, the fluid must be electrically insulating to avoid transmitting electric current to exposed metal parts of the system. Therefore, Toyota specifies that a polyolester (POE) oil (designated ND11) is required for repairs. The system cannot be serviced with equipment normally employed for regular cars, which typically use polyalkylene glycol (PAG) oil, as the equipment would contaminate the ND11 oil with PAG oil. According to SAE J2843, the oil provided from maintenance equipment must contain less than 0.1% PAG when filling. One percent PAG oil may result in an electrical resistance drop by a factor of about 10.

== Environmental impact ==
=== Fuel economy and emissions ===
United States

Since its introduction, the Toyota Prius has been among the best fuel economy vehicles available in the United States, and for the model year 2012, the Prius family has three models among the 10 most fuel-efficient cars sold in the country as rated by US Environmental Protection Agency (EPA). After the Honda Insight first generation was discontinued in September 2006, the Prius liftback became the most fuel-efficient car sold in the American market, until it was topped by the Chevrolet Volt in December 2010, as the plug-in hybrid was rated by EPA with an overall combined city/highway gasoline-electricity fuel economy of 60 mpg_{‑US} (3.9 L/100 km; 72 mpg_{‑imp}). According to the EPA, for the model year 2012, and when only petrol-powered vehicles are considered (excluding all-electric cars), the Prius c ranks as the most fuel-efficient compact car, the Prius liftback as the most fuel-efficient mid-size car, and the Prius v as the most fuel-efficient mid-size station wagon.

More fossil fuel is needed to build hybrid vehicles than conventional cars but reduced emissions when running the vehicle more than outweigh this.

Economic and environmental performance comparison
among Prius family models sold in the US (model year 2001–2021)

Vehicle	Model year	EPA city mileage (mpg)	EPA highway mileage (mpg)	Tailpipe CO_{2} emissions	EPA air pollution score Calif/others^{(1)}	Annual petroleum use (barrel)
Prius 1st gen (NHW11)	2001–2003	42 mpg_{‑US} (5.6 L/100 km)	41 mpg_{‑US} (5.7 L/100 km)	217 g/mi (135 g/km)	—N/a	8.0
Prius 2nd gen (XW20)	2004–2009	48 mpg_{‑US} (4.9 L/100 km)	45 mpg_{‑US} (5.2 L/100 km)	193 g/mi (120 g/km)	9/7; LEV-II SULEV	7.2
Prius 3rd gen (XW30)	2010–2015	51 mpg_{‑US} (4.6 L/100 km)	48 mpg_{‑US} (4.9 L/100 km)	178 g/mi (111 g/km)	9/7; SULEV II	6.6
Prius 4th gen (XW50)	2016–2021	54 mpg_{‑US} (4.4 L/100 km)	50 mpg_{‑US} (4.7 L/100 km)	170 g/mi (110 g/km)	9/7; California LEV-III SULEV30/PZEV	6.3
Prius v (ZVW41)	2012	44 mpg_{‑US} (5.3 L/100 km)	40 mpg_{‑US} (5.9 L/100 km)	212 g/mi (132 g/km)	8/7; LEV-II SULEV	7.8
Prius c (NHP10)	2012	53 mpg_{‑US} (4.4 L/100 km)	46 mpg_{‑US} (5.1 L/100 km)	178 g/mi (111 g/km)	—N/a	6.6
Prius Plug-in Hybrid (ZVW35)	2012	Gasoline equivalent in EV mode (blended operation)	Hybrid mode (combined)	133 g/mi (83 g/km)	All-electric range (blended mode)	
Prius Plug-in Hybrid (ZVW35)	2012	95 mpg‑e (35 kW⋅h/100 mi)	50 mpg_{‑US} (4.7 L/100 km)	133 g/mi (83 g/km)	11 mi (18 km)	
Source: US Department of Energy and US Environmental Protection Agency All ratings correspond to EPA 5-cycle testing procedure (2008 and beyond). Note: (1) First score is for California and Northeastern states, the second score is for the other states and D.C. Super Ultra Low Emission Vehicle (SULEV) is a US classification for conventionally powered vehicles designed to produce minimal emissions of certain categories of air pollution.

Japan

The following table presents fuel economy performance and carbon emissions for all Prius family models sold in Japan since 1997. The ratings are presented for both, the older official 10-15 mode cycle test and the new JC08 test designed for Japan's new standards that went into effect in 2015, but was already being used by several car manufacturers for new cars. The Prius 2nd generation became the first car to meet Japan's new 2015 Fuel Economy Standards measured under the JC08 test.

Fuel economy and CO_{2} emissions comparison
among Prius family models sold in Japan (years 1997–2012)

Vehicle	Production year	Official 10-15 mode test (km per litre)	New JC08 test (km per litre)	Tailpipe emissions (grams per km CO_{2}) 10-15 mode test	Tailpipe emissions (grams per km CO_{2}) JC08 test
Prius 1st gen (NHW10)	1997–2001	28 km/L (66 mpg_{‑US})	—N/a	—N/a	—N/a
Prius 1st gen (NHW11)	2001–2003	29 km/L (68 mpg_{‑US})	—N/a	—N/a	—N/a
Prius 2nd gen (XW20)	2004–2009	35.5 km/L (84 mpg_{‑US})	29.6 km/L (70 mpg_{‑US})	65	78
Prius 3rd gen (XW30)	2010–2012	38 km/L (89 mpg_{‑US})	32.6 km/L (77 mpg_{‑US})	61	71
Prius α (ZVW40)	2011	31 km/L (73 mpg_{‑US})	26.2 km/L (62 mpg_{‑US})	75	89
Toyota Aqua (NHP10)	2012	40 km/L (94 mpg_{‑US})	35.4 km/L (83 mpg_{‑US})	—N/a	—N/a
Prius Plug-in Hybrid (ZVW35)	2012	Gasoline equivalent in EV mode (blended operation)	Hybrid mode (charge-sustaining)	All-electric range (blended mode)	EV Mode; JC08 Test (grams per km CO_{2})
Prius Plug-in Hybrid (ZVW35)	2012	61 km/L (140 mpg_{‑US})	31.6 km/L (74 mpg_{‑US})	26.4 km (16.4 mi)	38

=== Lifetime energy usage ===
In 2008, the British government and British media requested that Toyota release detailed figures for the energy use and CO_{2} emissions resulting from the building and disposal of the Prius. Toyota has not supplied the requested data to address statements that the lifetime energy usage of the Prius (including the increased environmental cost of manufacture and disposal of the nickel-metal hydride battery) is outweighed by lower lifetime fuel consumption. Toyota states that lifetime CO_{2} saving is 43 percent. As of 2010, the UK Government Car Service operated over 100 Priuses (the largest part of its fleet) and lists the Prius as having the lowest CO_{2} emissions among its fleet.

CNW Marketing Research initially published a study in which they estimated that the total lifetime energy cost of a 2005 Prius was greater than that of a Hummer H2. The study has been widely debunked: see for example, "Hummer versus Prius: 'Dust to Dust' Report Misleads the Media and Public with Bad Science".

=== Electromagnetic field levels ===
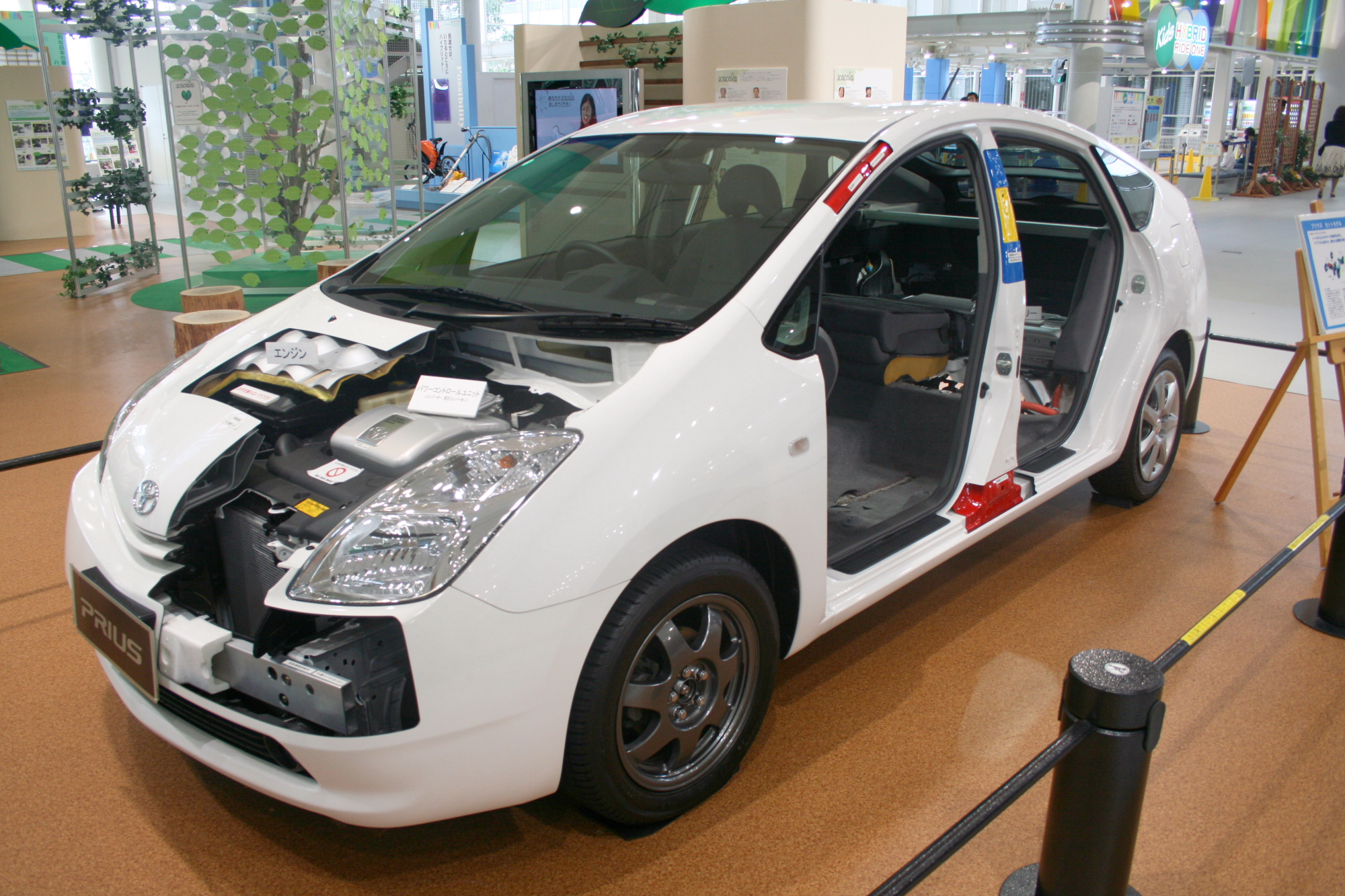
Prius cutaway model showing forward engine connected to rear high voltage battery

The Prius uses electric motors in the hybrid propulsion systems, powered by a high voltage battery in the rear of the car. There has been some public concern over whether the levels of electromagnetic field exposure within the cabin are higher than comparable cars, and what health effects those fields may present, popularized by a 2008 The New York Times article. Toyota and several independent studies have indicated that aside from a brief spike when accelerating, the electromagnetic fields within the Prius are no different from those of a conventional car and do not exceed the ICNIRP exposure guidelines.

A 2013 study by the Mayo Clinic found that patients with implanted cardiac devices such as pacemakers and defibrillators can safely drive or ride in hybrids or plug-in electric cars without risk of electromagnetic interference (EMI). The research was conducted using implantable devices from the three major manufacturers and a 2012 Toyota Prius hybrid. The study used 30 participants with implanted devices and measured electric and magnetic fields in six positions inside and outside the Prius, and each position was evaluated at different speeds.

=== Quietness ===
The Wall Street Journal reported in February 2007 on concerns that quiet cars like the Prius may pose a safety risk to pedestrians who rely on engine noise to sense the presence or location of moving vehicles. Blind pedestrians are a primary concern, and the National Federation of the Blind advocates audio emitters on hybrid vehicles, but it has been argued that increased risks may also affect sighted pedestrians or bicyclists who are accustomed to aural cues from vehicles. However, silent vehicles are already relatively common, and there is also a lack of aural cues from vehicles that have a conventional internal combustion engine where engine noise has been reduced by noise-absorbing materials in the engine bay and noise-cancelling muffler systems. In July 2007, a spokesman for Toyota said the company is aware of the issue and is studying options.

In 2010, Toyota released a device for the third-generation Prius meant to alert pedestrians of its proximity. Japan issued guidelines for such warning devices in January 2010 and the US approved legislation in December 2010. Models equipped with automatically activated systems include all 2012 and later model year Prius family vehicles that have been introduced in the United States, including the standard Prius, the Prius v, the Prius c and the Toyota Prius Plug-in Hybrid. The warning sound is activated when the car is traveling at less than 15 mph (24 km/h) and cannot be manually turned off.

== Marketing and culture ==
=== CO_{2} advertising ===
In the UK, the Advertising Standards Authority, an independent body charged with policing the rules of the advertising industry, ruled that a television advert for the Toyota Prius should not be broadcast again in the same form, having breached rules concerning misleading advertising. The advertisement stated that the Prius "emits up to one tonne less CO_{2} per year", while on-screen text included "1 tonne of CO_{2} less than an equivalent family vehicle with a diesel engine. Average calculated on 20,000 km a year." Points of contention were the vehicles chosen for comparison, whether "'up to' one tonne less" adequately communicated that reductions could be lower, and whether the distance used was appropriate: 20,000 km (12,000 miles) per year is around a US car's average annual driving distance, while a UK car's is 13,440 km (8,350 miles).

=== Political symbolism ===
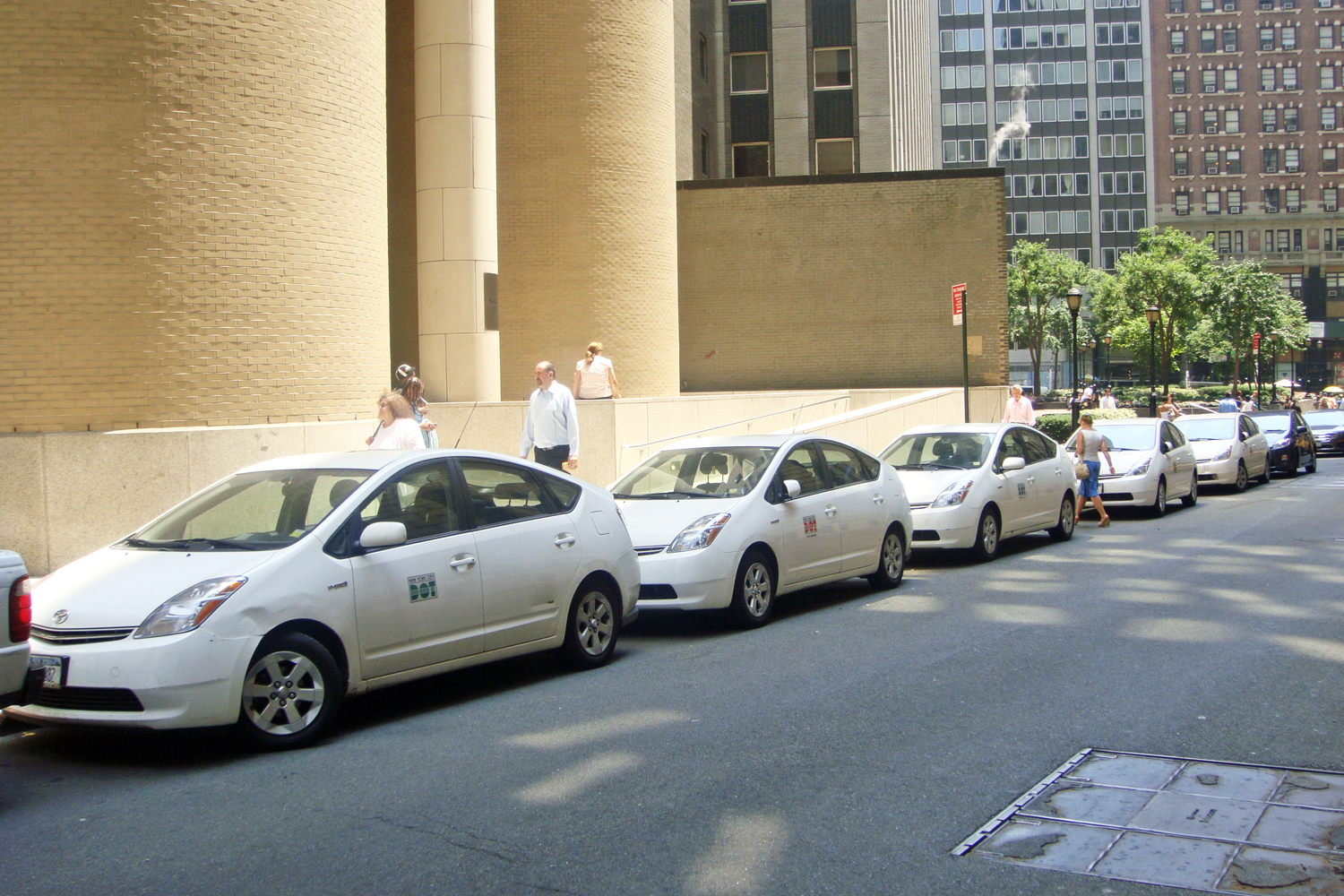
Prius fleet operated by the New York City Department of Transportation

The large number of Prius-owning progressive celebrities in 2002 prompted The Washington Post to dub hybrids "Hollywood's latest politically correct status symbol". Conservatives called "Prius Patriots" also drive the cars because they want to contribute to reducing US dependence on foreign oil. A 2007 San Francisco Chronicle article said "Prius Progressives" were becoming an archetype, with American conservative commentator Rush Limbaugh opining that "these liberals think they're ahead of the game on these things, and they're just suckers". A 2016 US survey of 10,000 people conducted by CarTalk found that Prius owners were more likely to support both Ted Cruz and Hillary Clinton compared to the general population.

In July 2007, The New York Times published an article using data from CNW Marketing Research finding that 57% of Prius buyers in the US said their main reason for buying was that "it makes a statement about me", while just 37% cited fuel economy as a prime motivator. Shortly afterwards Washington Post columnist Robert Samuelson coined the term "Prius politics" to describe a situation where the driver's desire to "show off" is a stronger motivator than the desire to curb greenhouse gas emissions. Some conservatives promote the use of the Toyota Prius and other hybrid cars. For example, Jim Road from What Would Jesus Drive? encouraged people to drive hybrid cars because of the damage that large SUVs and faster cars can do to others.

Former Central Intelligence Agency (CIA) chief R. James Woolsey, Jr. drives a Prius because of its low fuel consumption. Woolsey noted the volatility of the Middle East, coupled with anti-US sentiment in much of the region. Noting that the high percentage of oil drilled in the Middle East gives vast profits to Middle Eastern regimes, Woolsey believes that it is a patriotic obligation to drive more efficient vehicles. In a Motor Trend magazine article, Woolsey stated that those oil profits find their way to terrorist groups like al-Qaeda, meaning that Americans who buy inefficient vehicles would, in effect, be indirectly funding terrorism. "We're paying for both sides in this war, and that's not a good long-term strategy," said Woolsey. "I have a bumper sticker on the back of my Prius that reads, 'Bin Laden hates this car.'"

=== DARPA driverless edition ===
A driverless version of the Prius was one of six cars to finish the 2007 DARPA Urban Challenge.

== Motorsports ==
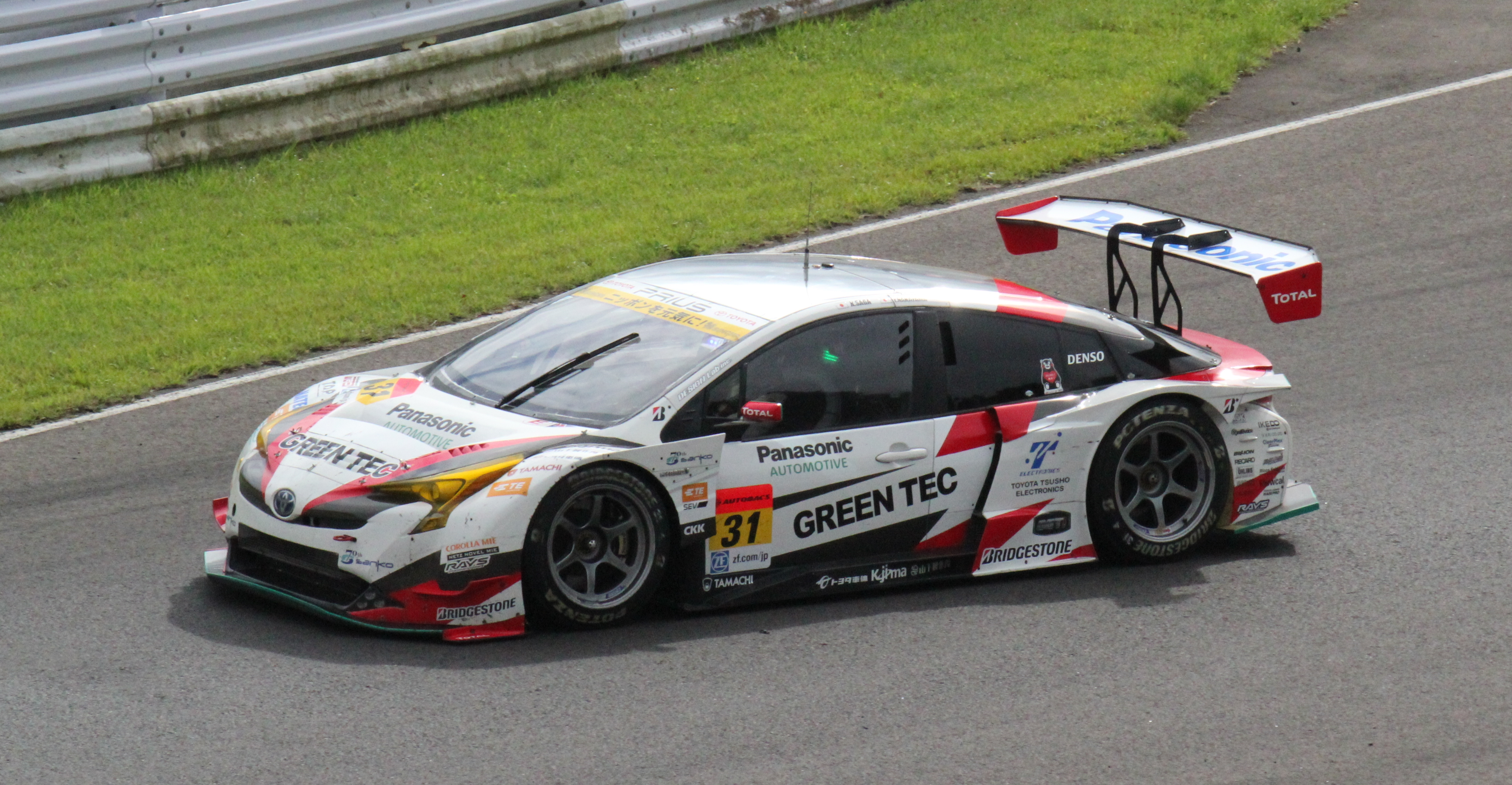
A Toyota Prius apr GT at Sportsland SUGO

A racing version of the Prius was unveiled by Toyota for the 2012 Super GT series in Japan. This racing Prius replaces the 1.8-litre Atkinson-cycle engine with a 3.4-litre V8 RV8KLM engine which is mid-mounted in the car. The hybrid drivetrain of the car's production Hybrid Synergy Drive is retained but with a larger lithium-ion battery. The RV8KLM is the same engine featured in multiple Le Mans Prototypes such as the Lola B12/60 and Rebellion R-One. The car took class pole position and finished sixth at the 2012 Fuji GT 500km.

For 2019 a new version of the Prius was unveiled. Based on the Prius PHV GR Sport, this version of the Prius was powered by a 5.4 L 2UR-GSE V8 mounted in the front of the car. The hybrid system was retained for this version of the car but only on the #31 car. The Prius was retired from Super GT competition after the 2022 Super GT Series.

== Government and corporate incentives ==
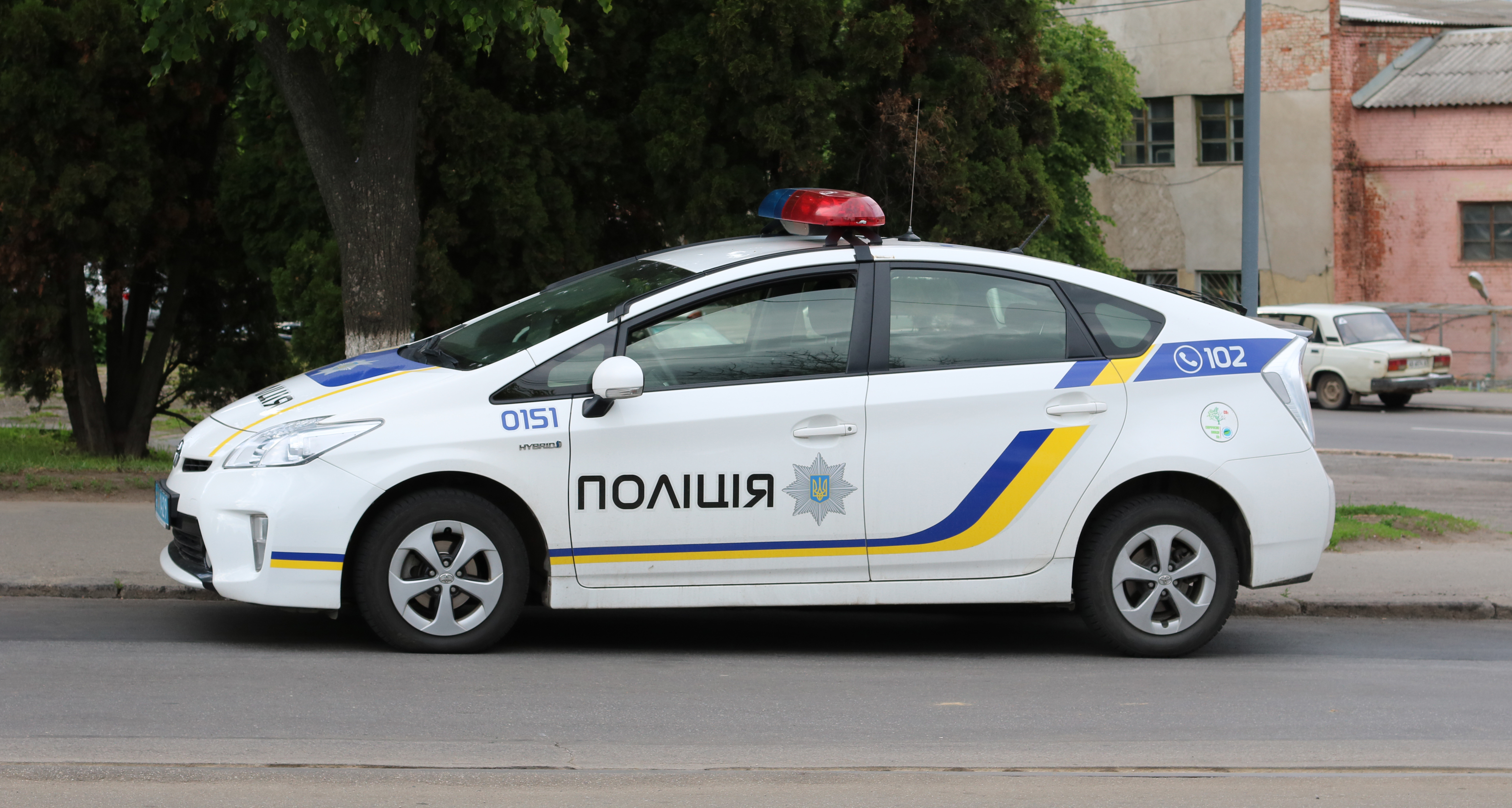
Ukrainian Toyota Prius in National Police service

There have been a number of governments with incentives intended to encourage hybrid car sales. In some countries, including the US and Canada, some rebate incentives have been exhausted, while other countries such as the United Kingdom, Sweden, Belgium, and the Netherlands have various or alternative incentives to purchasing a hybrid vehicle.

Several US companies offer employees incentives. Bank of America will reimburse US$3,000 on the purchase of new hybrid vehicles to full- and part-time associates working more than 20 hours per week. Google, software company Hyperion Solutions, and organic food and drink producer Clif Bar & Co offer employees a US$5,000 credit toward their purchase of certain hybrid vehicles including the Prius. Integrated Archive Systems, a Palo Alto IT company, offers a US$10,000 subsidy toward the purchase of hybrid vehicles to full-time employees employed more than one year.

Travelers Companies, a large insurance company, offers hybrid owners a 10% discount on auto insurance in most US states. The Farmers Insurance Group offers a similar discount of up to 10% in most US states.

In June 2015, the Prius started use as a general purpose patrol car of the National Police of Ukraine. In return for Ukrainian emissions permits under the Kyoto Protocol, 1,568 cars were supplied by Japan.

The Philippine National Police is one of the agency beneficiaries of the Toyota Prius (2017 model) hybrid cars donated by the Department of Energy (DOE) through the Japan’s Non-Project Grant Aid (NPGA) as part of the DOE’s campaign to promote energy efficiency and clean air across the country. Forty-five units of the vehicle will be given to Police Regional Office 8 particularly the areas which were affected by Typhoon Yolanda in 2013 to support the socio-economic recovery of the communities and provide additional police mobility. The official turnover of donation led by Ambassador Kazuhide Ishikawa, Embassy of Japan to the Philippines, and Department of Energy Secretary Alfonso Cusi was held on 19 May 2017 at the DOE Sunken Garden in Taguig where representatives of the agency beneficiaries received the key replicas.

== See also ==
- Comparison of Toyota hybrids
