= E-four =

4WD system developed by Toyota

E-Four (short for Electrical 4WD System), eFour, AWD-i, or AWD-e was developed by Toyota. Front wheels are powered directly by the hybrid powertrain, rear wheels are powered by a dedicated electric motor with its own power control unit, reduction gear and differential. Amount of torque transferred to the rear wheels is automatically adjusted by the vehicle's electronic control unit according to driving conditions. E-Four also adds additional regenerative braking. In North America, Toyota uses the term AWD-i (All-Wheel Drive with Intelligence). There is no drive shaft between the front combustion engine and rear wheels. The rear wheels only receive power and torque from the rear electric motor(s).

E-Four was first implemented in the 2001 Toyota Estima Hybrid and is used in several Toyota and Lexus cars, e.g. 2016 Toyota RAV4, Lexus NX 300h, Lexus RX 450h, and Toyota Prius AWD-e, and in the future may be used in the standard fifth generation Toyota Prius. In Japan, the all-wheel-drive Prius has been available since 2015 and bumps the price by about $1700. The compact HV4WD E-Four used for the Prius adds little weight and does not reduce the fuel economy or interior storage. A few weeks before the November 2018 Los Angeles Auto Show, Toyota issued a press release with text and images featuring the car in snowy conditions, suggesting the E-Four package would likely debut in the 2019 U.S. model at the show.
