= Mixed-mode =

Mixed-mode may refer to:

- Blended mode, a charge-depleting mode of operation for plug-in hybrid electric vehicles
- Mixed Mode CD, a CD in which two different data types are combined
- Mixed-mode commuting, passenger transport involving two or more modes of transportation in a journey
- Mixed-mode chromatography, utilizing more than one form of interaction between the stationary phase and analytes
- Mixed-mode integrated circuit, any integrated circuit that has both analog circuits and digital circuits
- Mixed-mode ventilation, which uses a combination of operable windows and mechanical systems
- Modal mixture or borrowed chords, the use of musical chords from the parallel key
