= Toyota Prius Plug-in Hybrid =

Liftback motor vehicle

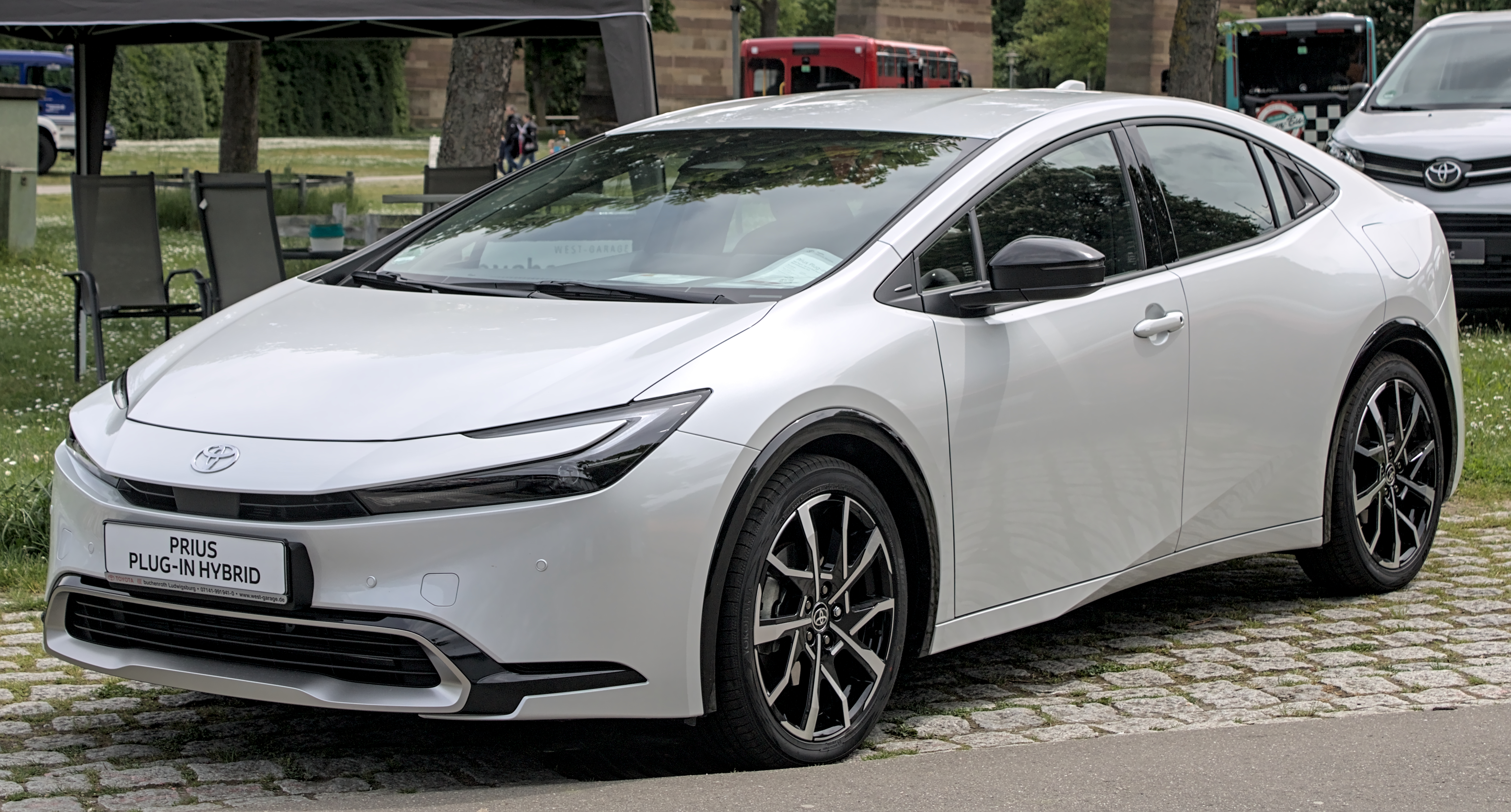

Overview
- Manufacturer: Toyota
- Also called: Toyota Prius Prime (2016–2024)
- Production: January 2012 – present
- Model years: 2012–present

Body and chassis
- Class: Compact car (C)
- Body style: 5-door liftback
- Layout: Front-engine, front-wheel-drive

The Toyota Prius Plug-in Hybrid (often abbreviated as the Prius PHEV or PHV and initially marketed as the Prius Prime in North America, South Korea, and New Zealand from 2016 to 2024) is a plug-in hybrid liftback manufactured by Toyota. The first-generation model was produced from 2012 to 2016. The second-generation model has been produced since 2016. Production of the third-generation model began in 2023.

The Prius Plug-in Hybrid was the second most sold plug-in electric car in 2012, and became third-best all-time in December 2014. As sales declined after the end of its production, the Prius PHV fell to fifth place in the global ranking by November 2015, after being surpassed by both the Tesla Model S and the Mitsubishi Outlander PHEV. As of December 2017, sales were led by North America with 66,800 units, followed by Japan with 48,800, and the European market with 13,100 units. The U.S. was the leading country market with 65,703 units sold by 2017. As of December 2019, cumulative global sales of both Prius plug-in generations totaled 209,000 units.

== Concept and demonstration models ==
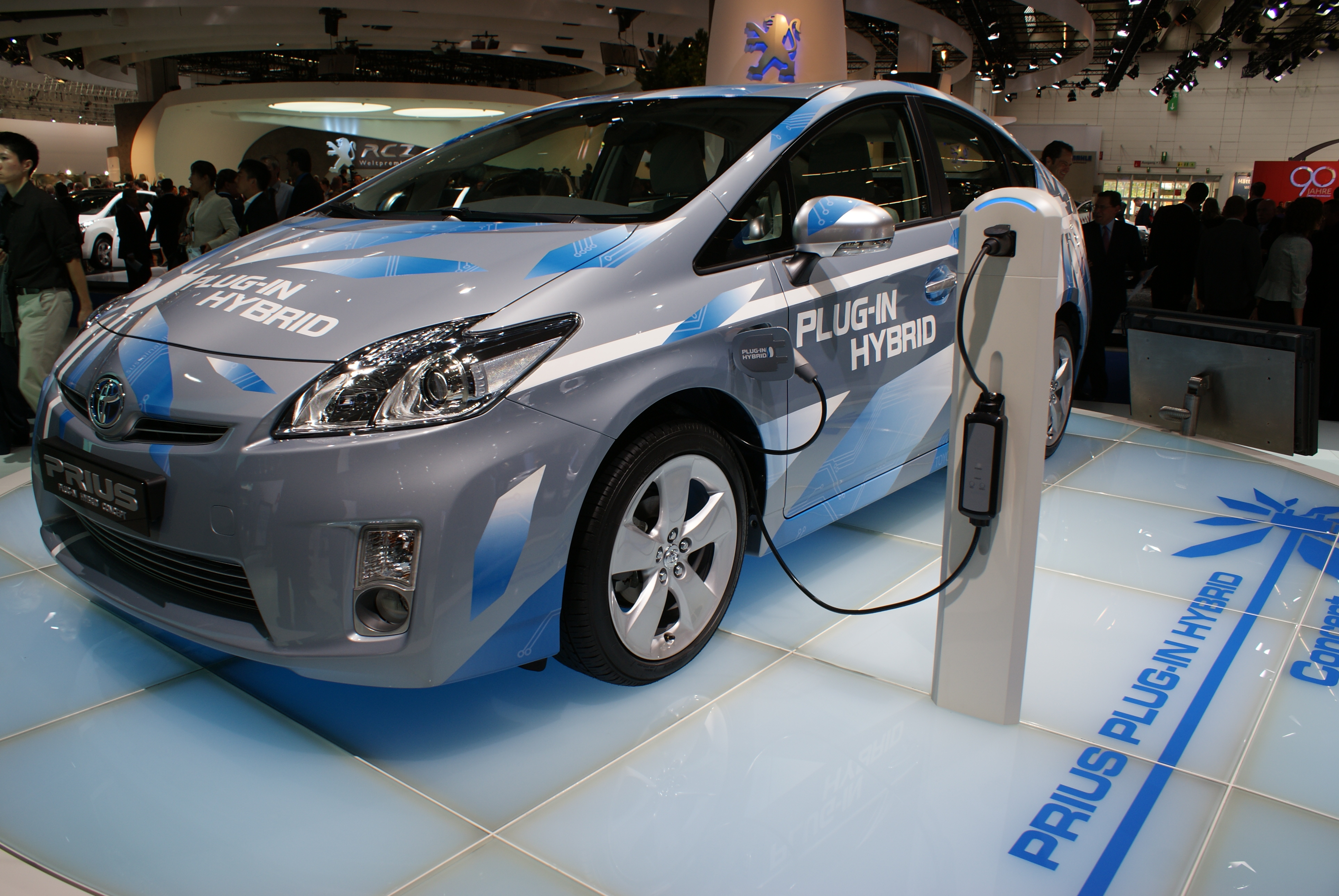
Prius Plug-In Hybrid Concept at the 2009 Frankfurt Motor Show

The Prius Plug-In Hybrid Concept was exhibited at the September 2009 Frankfurt Motor Show, the October 2009 Tokyo Motor Show, and the December 2009 Los Angeles Auto Show. The vehicle was based on the third-generation Toyota Prius (model XW30) but outfitted with 5.2 kWh lithium-ion batteries. The selected battery capacity is the minimum required for a vehicle to be eligible for the U.S. federal tax credit of US$2,500, which under the American Clean Energy and Security Act of 2009 applies to the first 200,000 plug-ins sold by an automaker.

After displaying the concept version in these three shows, a global demonstration program involving 600 pre-production test cars began in late 2009 and took place in Australia, Canada, China, France, Germany, Japan, New Zealand and the United States. The demonstration vehicles were made available for lease to fleet and government customers, of which, 230 were delivered in Japan beginning in late December 2009, 125 in the U.S. by early 2010, and 200 in Europe in spring 2010. All program vehicles were equipped with data tracking devices to allow Toyota to monitor the car's usage for further development of the plug-in hybrid system.

The pre-production Prius Plug-in used three different batteries: two added batteries to provide all-electric drive and the standard hybrid battery which engages when the first two are depleted, allowing the car to operate like a regular hybrid Prius. According to Toyota, when the vehicle started, it operates in all-electric mode, drawing electrical power directly from the first battery pack. When the first battery was depleted, it disconnected from the circuit and the second pack engaged. When the second pack was depleted, it disconnected from the circuit and the vehicle defaulted to conventional hybrid mode, using the main battery as the sole electrical power source. Pack one and pack two would not reengage with the circuit until the vehicle was plugged in and charged.

According to Toyota, the demonstrator was rated at 1.76 L/100 km (134 mpg_{‑US}; 161 mpg_{‑imp}) on the Japanese JC08 cycle with a combined efficiency based on 43.6% of driving in EV mode, and CO_{2} emissions of 41 g/km. Fuel efficiency operating as a gasoline-electric hybrid, like the regular Prius, is 3.3 L/100 km (72 mpg_{‑US}; 86 mpg_{‑imp}) with CO_{2} emissions of 76 g/km.

=== Demonstration programs by country ===
Australia

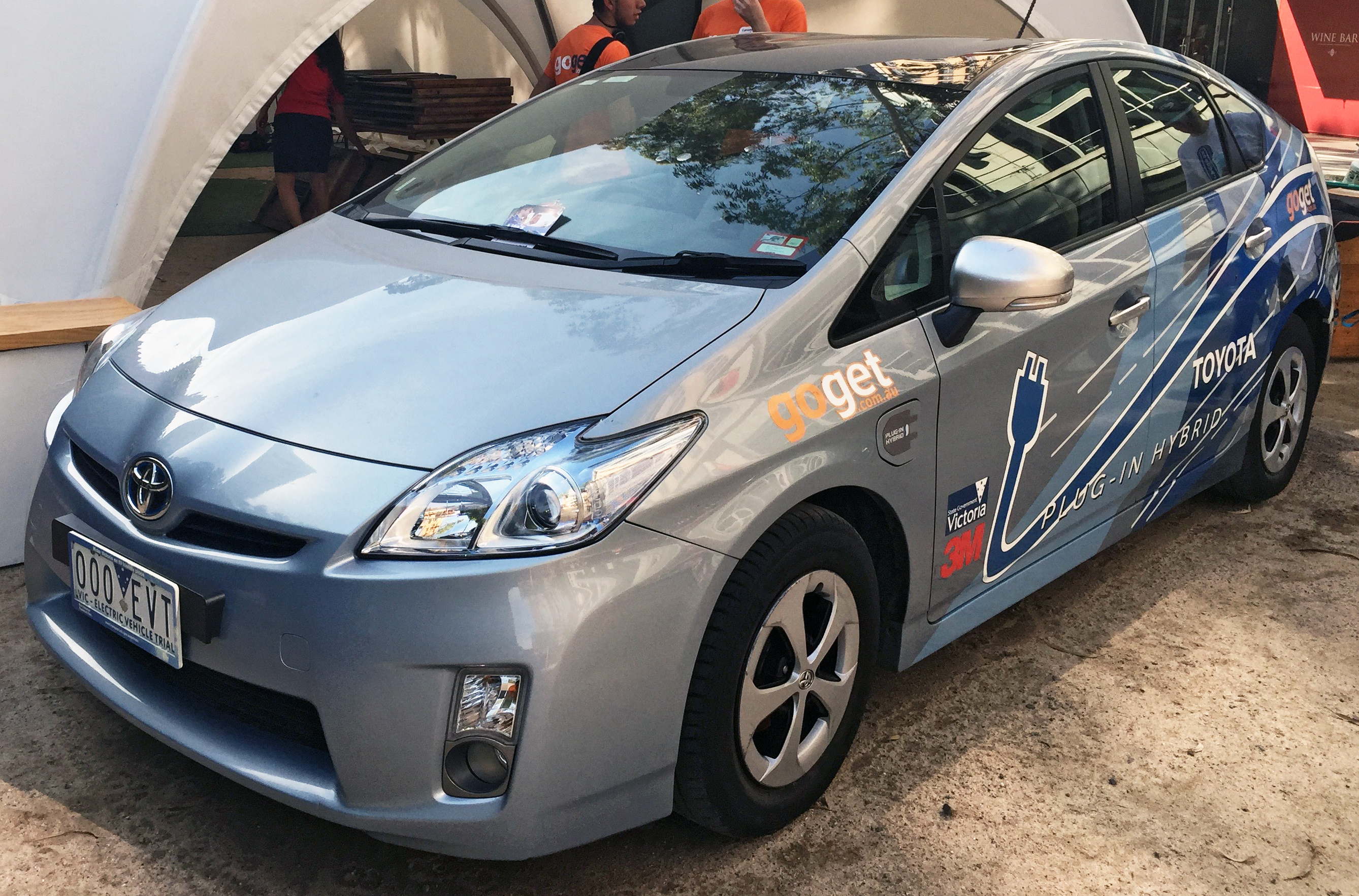
Prius Plug-In Hybrid demonstration program vehicle operating for GoGet CarShare in Australia

The program in Australia included five demonstrator plug-ins allocated to government agencies.

Canada

In March 2010 Toyota launched its demonstration program in Canada with five demonstrator plug-ins in partnership with academic institutions, hydro-electric producers, and governmental agencies in each of the four provinces participating in the program: British Columbia, Manitoba, Ontario and Québec. Canada is home to Toyota's global cold weather research center in Northern Ontario, and the country's cold weather serves to evaluate its adverse effect on battery performance and range.

In July 2010 the first demonstrator plug-in was delivered in Manitoba. The unit was shared and tested by partners Manitoba Hydro, Manitoba Innovation, Energy and Mines, and the University of Manitoba. There were a total of 15 partners in the four provinces that participated in the Canadian demonstration trial.

China

On 28 October 2010, Toyota signed an agreement with China Automotive Technology and Research Center on jointly carrying out field trials of the demonstrator plug-ins in China.

France

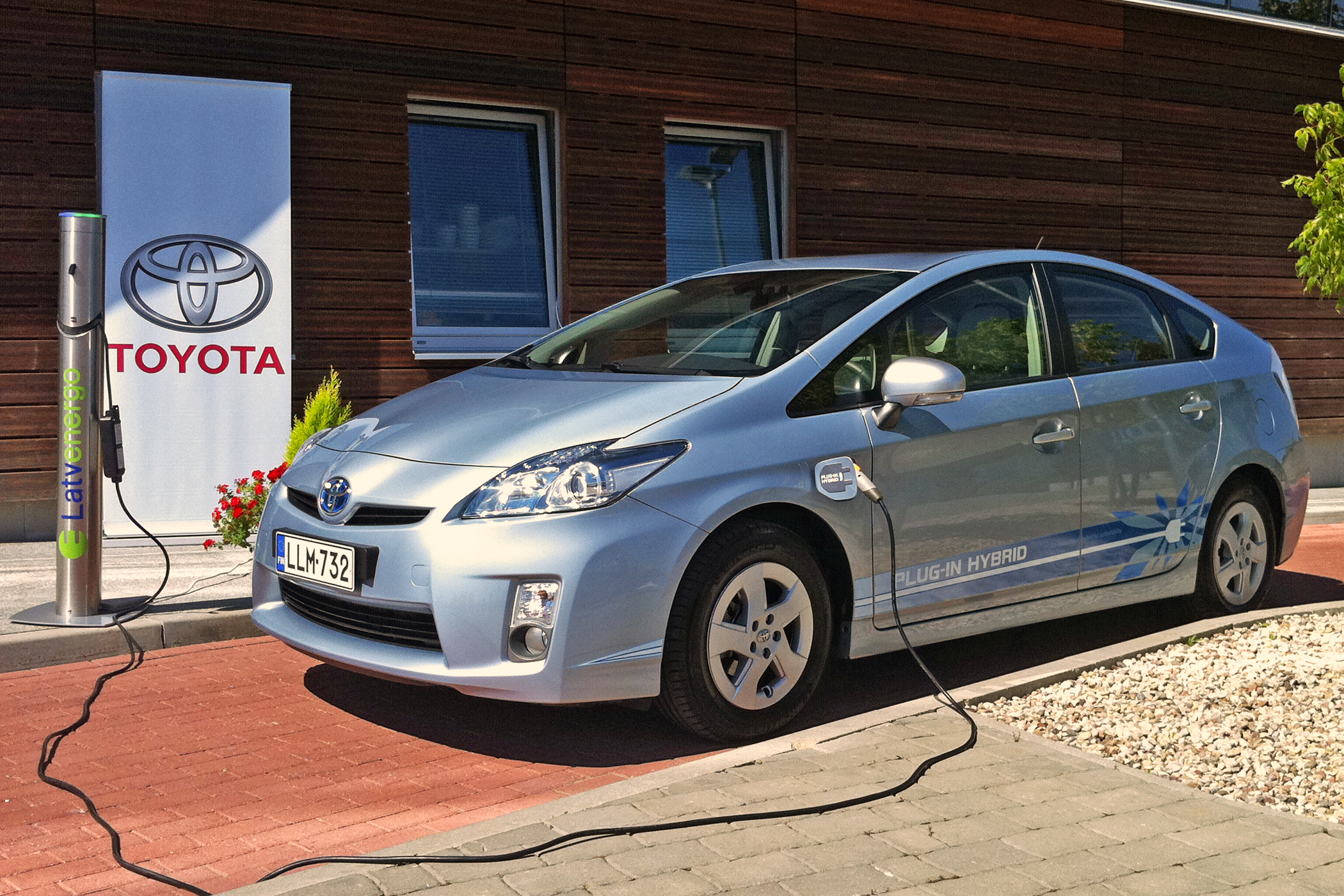
Toyota Prius Plug-in Hybrid demonstration program vehicle in Europe

The demonstration program in Strasbourg was launched in April 2010. The 3-year program involved 70 demonstrator plug-ins and the deployment of dedicated charging infrastructure. The program set up more than 150 charging points at private parking lots of firms participating in the program, user homes, public parking lots and on public roads. The program was run by Électricité de France in partnership with Toyota and the City and the Urban Community of Strasbourg, and is financially supported through a research fund managed by the French Environment and Energy Management Agency.

The City and the Urban Community of Strasbourg leased five demonstrator plug-ins and also provided a subsidy to a local carsharing company to lease three demonstrators. The remaining vehicles were leased to other public institutions and private companies.

Germany

The demonstration program in Germany was conducted in Baden-Württemberg with ten demonstrator plug-ins and the corresponding dedicated charging infrastructure. The program was run by German energy provider EnBW.

Japan

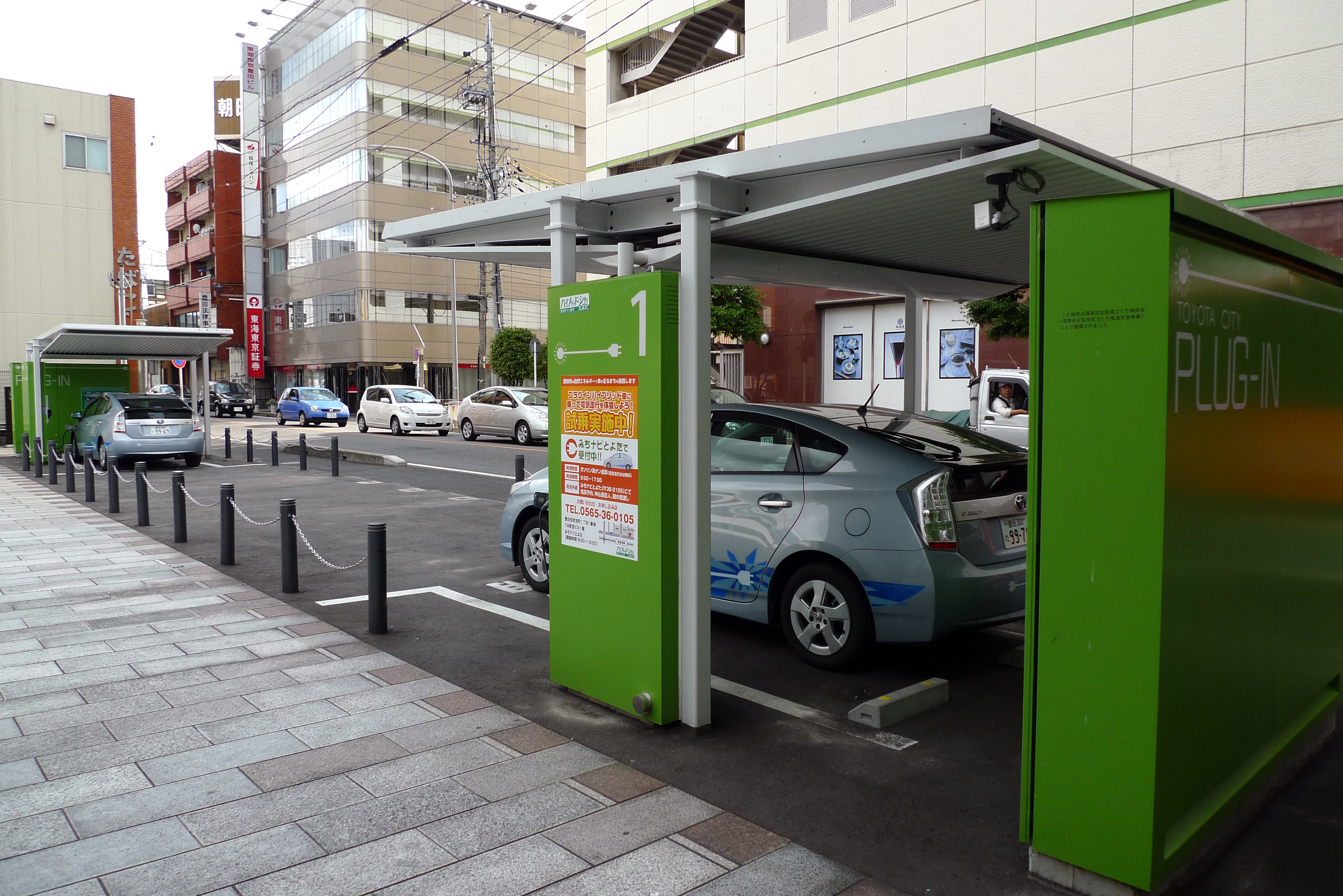
Prius Plug-in Hybrid demonstration program vehicle recharging at a solar-powered charging station in Toyota, Aichi, Japan

In Japan, Toyota leased approximately 230 demonstrator plug-ins to government ministries, local governments selected for the Japanese Ministry of Economy, Trade and Industry's EV & PHV Towns program, corporations such, as electric power companies, and other entities. As part of the demonstration program and beginning in July 2010, two demonstrator plug-ins were made available for short-term rental in the city of Gotō, Nagasaki. The rental fees were ¥8,400 (US$96) for up to six hours, ¥9,450 (US$108) for up to 12 hours, ¥11,550 (US$131) for up to 24 hours, and ¥9,450 (US$108) for each additional day.

United Kingdom

The demonstration trial in the UK began in late June 2010 with a fleet of 20 demonstrator plug-ins. Toyota partnered with Électricité de France to carry out a three-year trial, and as part of the program a number of charging bays were deployed in London. The trial Prius Plug-in Hybrids are available through leasing to public sector organizations and business users. Among the organizations that received the first Prius Plug-ins are Transport for London, the Government Car and Despatch Agency, the Metropolitan Police Service, News International and Sky.

United States

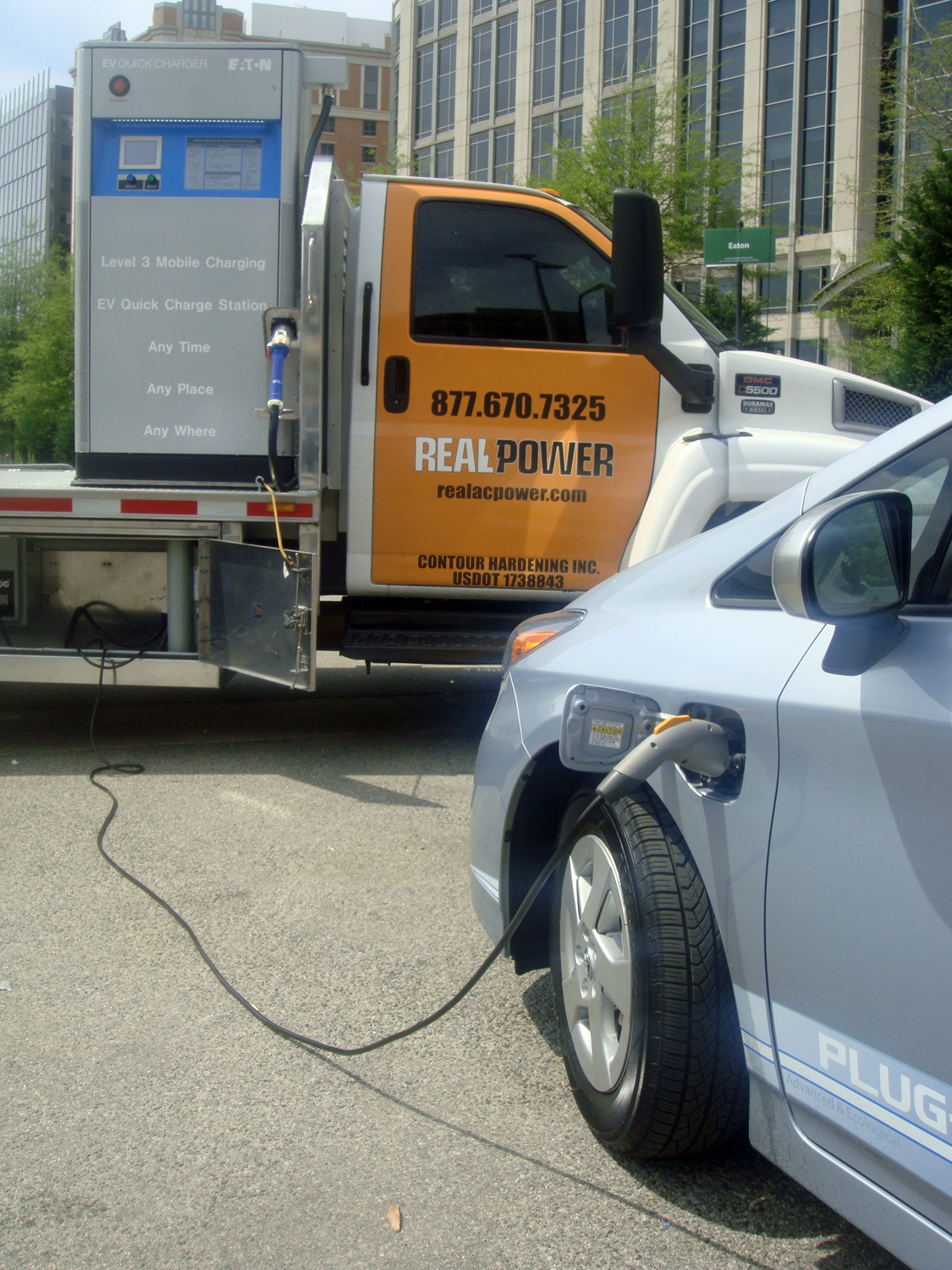
Prius Plug-in Hybrid demonstration program vehicle recharging from a mobile fast charging unit in Washington, D.C.

A total of 125 demonstrator plug-ins were deployed in the US. In October 2009, Toyota announced its first regional program partnership in the U.S. with Xcel Energy's SmartGridCity program in Boulder, Colorado. The research project was coordinated by the University of Colorado at Boulder Renewable and Sustainable Energy Institute (RASEI). Boulder offered the opportunity of monitoring the performance of Toyota's first-generation lithium-ion battery at high altitude and under cold climate. Other partnerships were made with Qualcomm and the South Coast Air Quality Management District. Other regional programs considered were Northern and Southern California, Washington, D.C., New York City, Portland and Pittsburgh, which offered different conditions for vehicle performance and customer needs.

In June 2010 the demonstration vehicles were delivered to Portland State University, the Silicon Valley Leadership Group, San Diego Gas & Electric and the California Center for Sustainable Energy. In the following weeks, an additional 30 vehicles were assigned to Silicon Valley groups and companies, including the University of California, Berkeley. In August 2010 two demonstrators were delivered to be tested in San Francisco's municipal fleet as part of the demonstration program.

Georgetown University was the first partner in Washington, D.C. to participate in the program under the sponsorship of the U.S. Department of Energy's Clean Cities program. Two demonstrators were loaned in December 2010 and sixteen Georgetown employees tested the vehicles in three-month rotations. Five demonstrators were delivered to New York City, two were tested by the New York City Department of Transportation and three by the Port Authority of New York and New Jersey.

As part of the demonstration program, Toyota delivered eight Prius plug-in hybrids to Zipcar in January 2011. The car sharing firm selected three markets to make the plug-in hybrids available to its members, three cars in Boston and Cambridge, Massachusetts, three in San Francisco, California, and two in Portland, Oregon.

=== Field test results ===
Europe

Toyota reported the following findings for the European demonstration fleet after about a year of testing, representing the driving experience acquired by the participants after 800,000 km (497,100 mi) driven:

- Two-thirds of commute trips traveled a distance of less than 20.1 km (12.5 mi), the expected all-electric range in EV mode.
- More than a third of the participants made long-distance trips of more than 100 km (62 mi) at least once a week.
- The demonstrator vehicles consumed 36% less fuel than the comparable, best-in-class diesel vehicle, and almost 50% less than the best-in-class gasoline vehicle.
- The maximum average fuel consumption figure observed was more than 2.00 L/100 km (117 mpg_{‑US}; 141 mpg_{‑imp}).

United Kingdom

Based on the results from less than one year of real-world use for the 20 demonstrators leased to EDF Energy, Toyota reported the following findings:

- Driving in electric-only (EV) mode accounted for one-third of the distance driven in the demonstration.
- The average trip distance was 11.7 km (7.3 miles), with 59% of all journeys covering between 5 and 20 km (3.1 and 12.4 miles).
- Twenty-two percent of drivers were able to drive further than the official 20.1 km (12.5 miles) range in EV mode.
- Fuel consumption data indicates performance is 27% better than an equivalent diesel-powered vehicle.

United States

Consumer Reports tested a demonstrator for two weeks and reported an all-electric range between 23 and 27 km (14 and 17 mi) upfront at the beginning of each trip. On a 126 km (78-mile) trip, the vehicle averaged 3.70 L/100 km (63.5 mpg_{‑US}; 76.3 mpg_{‑imp}), while on commute trips between 32 and 48 km (20 and 30 miles) the vehicle averaged 2.9–2.7 L/100 km (81–86 mpg_{‑US}; 97–103 mpg_{‑imp}) with an EV ratio of 40 to 56 percent.

The California Center for Sustainable Energy tested two demonstrators with 13 different drivers over seven weeks and reported an average combined fuel economy of 2.8 L/100 km (83 mpg_{‑US}; 100 mpg_{‑imp}) on an average round trip commute of 35 km (22 miles). The best average attained was 2.40 L/100 km (97.9 mpg_{‑US}; 117.6 mpg_{‑imp}) on an average round trip commute of 77 km (48 miles).

Motor Trend tested a demonstrator for 32 days and reported average CO_{2} emissions of 80 g/km (0.28 lb/mile), an average all-electric range of 18.8 km (11.7 miles), and an average combined fuel economy of 3.34 L/100 km (70.4 mpg_{‑US}; 84.5 mpg_{‑imp}) over the 3,030 km (1,880 mi) accumulated during their trial.

Based on trials with 160 consumers across the United States, Toyota found that testers charged the vehicle more frequently than they anticipated they would, with about 10 charges per week, but the electricity cost was lower than the testers thought, about US$150 (equivalent to $214.68 in 2025) for the entire six-week trial.

== First generation (XW30; 2012) ==
First generation (XW30)
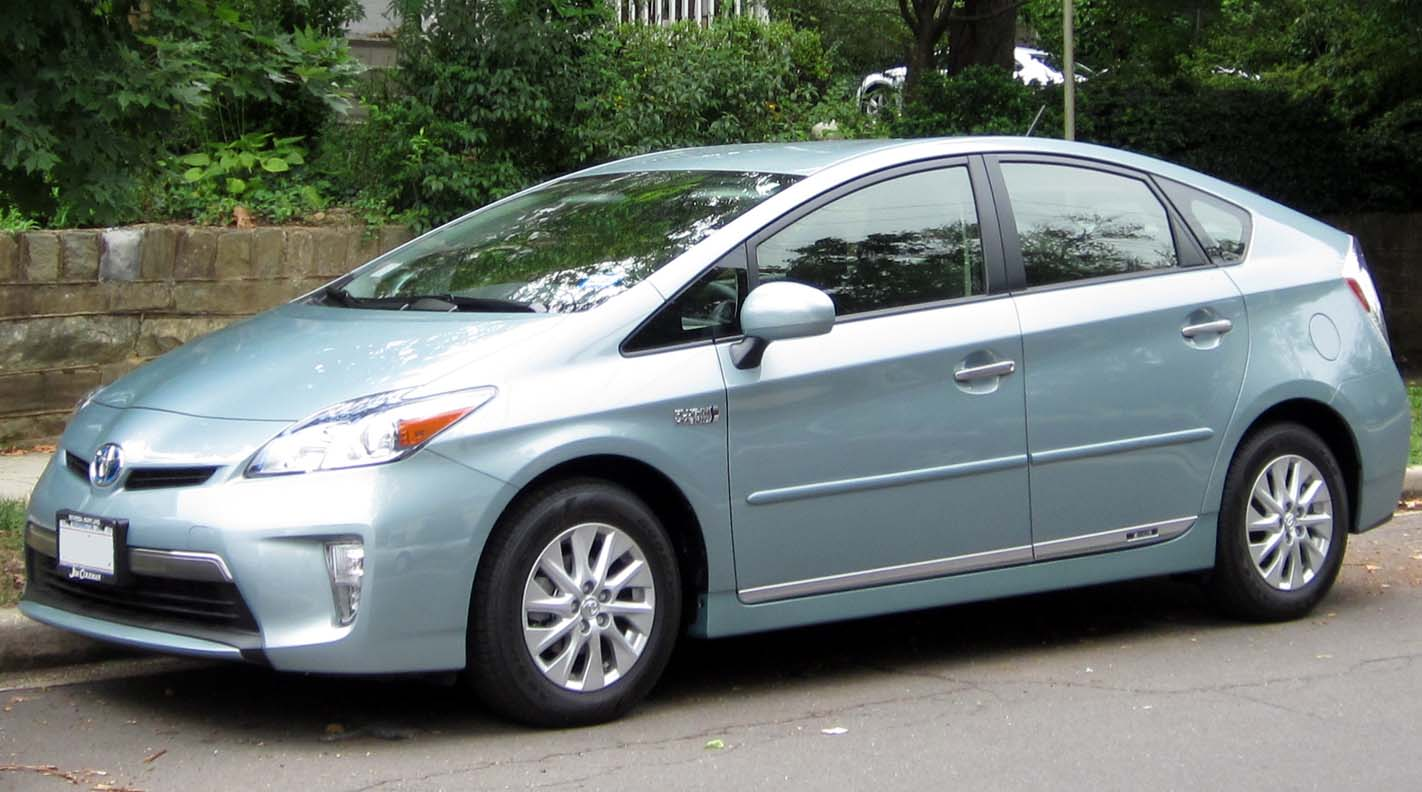
- Toyota Prius Plug-in Hybrid

Overview
- Production: January 2012 – October 2016
- Model years: 2012–2016
- Assembly: Japan: Toyota, Aichi (Tsutsumi plant)

Body and chassis
- Related: Toyota Prius (XW30); Toyota Prius V; Toyota Mirai (JPD10)

Powertrain
- Engine: 1.8 L 2ZR-FXE I4 (gasoline hybrid)
- Electric motor: Dual motor–generator (MG) system: MG1: 42 kW (56 hp); MG2: 60 kW (80 hp)
- Transmission: Planetary gear eCVT
- Hybrid drivetrain: Power-split PHEV (Hybrid Synergy Drive)
- Battery: 4.4 kWh lithium-ion battery
- Range: 870 km (540 mi)
- Electric range: 18 km (11 mi) (EPA, blended mode); 23 km (14 mi) (NEDC); 26.4 km (16.4 mi) (Japanese JC08 cycle)
- Plug-in charging: 2 kW 100–240 V onboard charger for 1Φ 12 A

Dimensions
- Wheelbase: 2,700 mm (106.3 in)
- Length: 4,460 mm (175.6 in)
- Width: 1,745 mm (68.7 in)
- Height: 1,490 mm (58.7 in)
- Curb weight: 1,420 kg (3,130 lb)

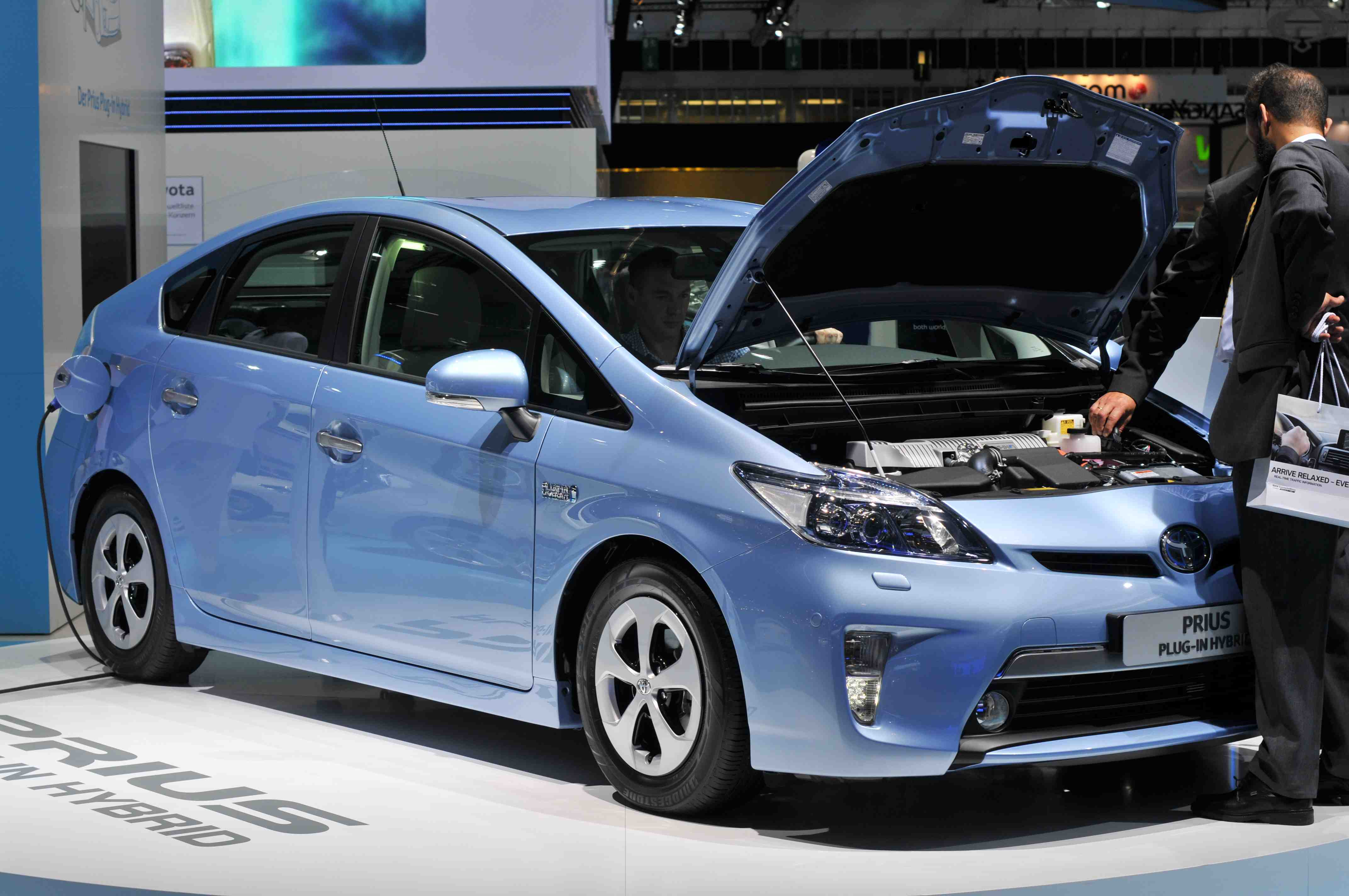
Prius Plug-in Hybrid production vehicle unveiled at the 2011 Frankfurt Motor Show

For the first-generation Prius plug-in, the total all-electric range in blended mode is 18 kilometres (11 miles) as rated by the United States Environmental Protection Agency (EPA). The EPA fuel economy rating is 95 miles per gallon gasoline equivalent (mpg-e) (2.5 L/100 km; 114 mpg-imp) in charge-depleting (all-electric or EV mode) and a combined city/highway rating of 4.7 L/100 km (50 mpg_{‑US}; 60 mpg_{‑imp}) in hybrid mode, the same as the conventional Prius liftback. The car was based on a third-generation Toyota Prius (model XW30) outfitted with a 4.4 kWh lithium-ion battery co-developed with Panasonic. Deliveries of the production model began in Japan in January 2012, in late February in the United States, and by late June 2012 in Europe. A total of about 75,400 first-generation units were sold worldwide through April 2016.

After the conclusion of the demonstration program, the production version of the Prius Plug-in Hybrid was unveiled at the September 2011 Frankfurt Motor Show. Toyota ultimately only did a small production run of this first-generation Prius Plug-in Hybrid between January 2012 and October 2016. A cumulative total of 75,400 vehicles were sold worldwide between December 2012 and April 2016. The United States led sales with 42,345 first-generation units delivered through September 2016, when dealerships run out of stock. Japan ranked second with 22,100 units, followed by Europe with 10,600 units, both through January 2017.

The first-generation Toyota Prius Plug-in Hybrid has a maximum electric-only speed of 100 km/h (62 mph). Because of that limitation, the United States Environmental Protection Agency (EPA) rated the vehicle as having a range of 18 km (11 mi) in blended mode (mostly electric, but supplemented by the internal combustion engine). The EPA rated the all-electric range at 10 km (6 mi). In blended mode, the plug-in has a fuel economy rating of 95 miles per gallon gasoline equivalent (mpg-e) (36 kW⋅h/100 mi; 22 kW⋅h/100 km). When in hybrid mode, the vehicle has a combined city/highway rating of 50 mpg_{‑US} (4.7 L/100 km; 60 mpg_{‑imp}), the same as the conventional third-generation Prius. According to Toyota the Prius plug-in is expected to be rated in Europe at 2.10 L/100 km (112 mpg_{‑US}; 135 mpg_{‑imp}) equivalent, with CO_{2} emissions of 49 g/km (2.8 oz/mi).

=== Drivetrain ===
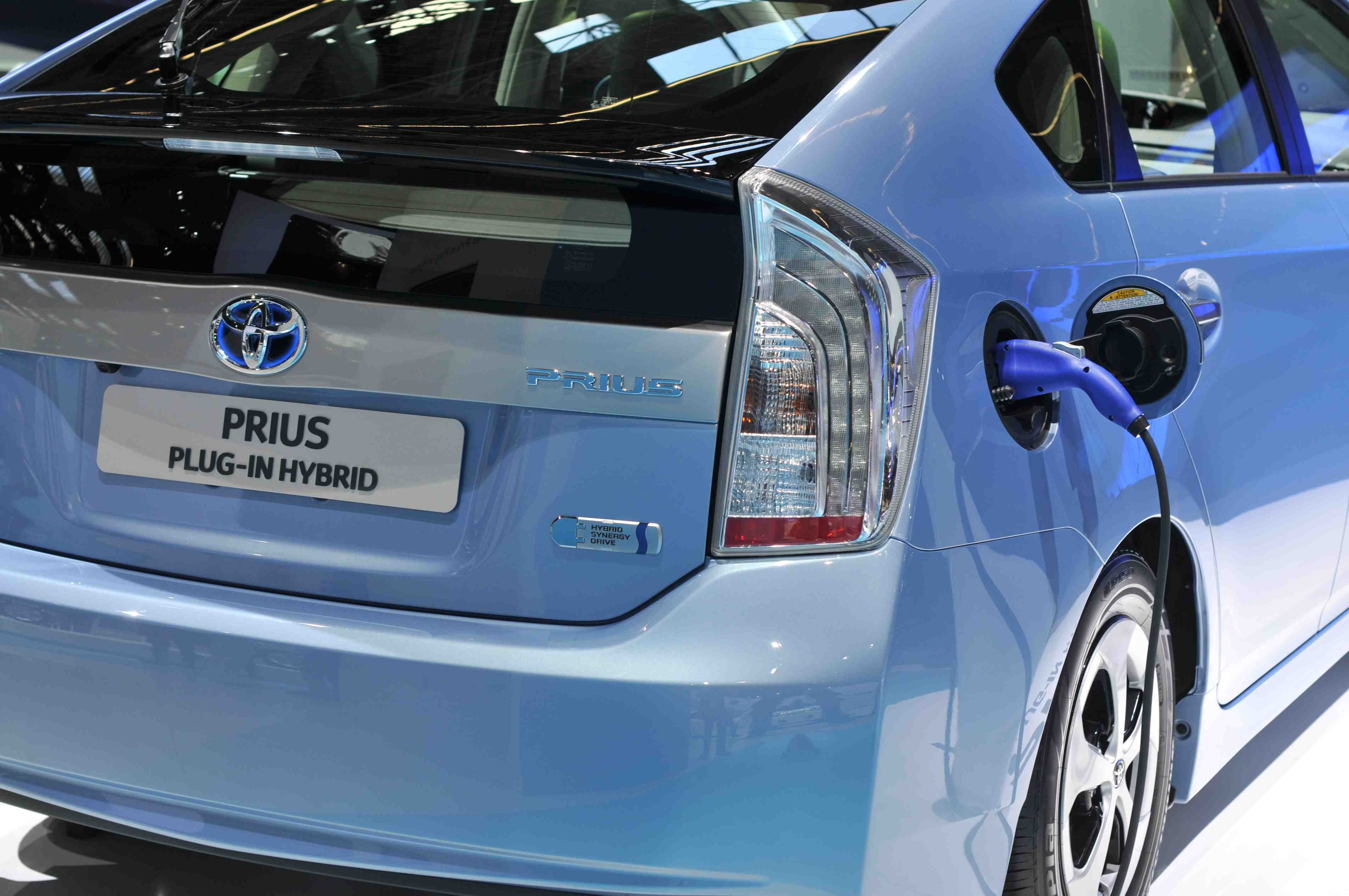
The charging port in the production vehicle is located on the right-rear fender

The production version of the Prius Plug-in has two key modifications from the demonstration units based on the data and customer feedback gathered. The production version has a selectable electric driving mode (EV mode), allowing drivers to conserve energy for use in those places where EV mode is more efficient, such as city driving. Additionally, production vehicles utilize a single battery, allowing more regenerative braking energy to be captured, extending range in EV mode.

The Prius Plug-in Hybrid uses the Hybrid Synergy Drive of the standard third-generation Prius (XW30), but with a 4.4 kWh lithium-ion battery that significantly expands the all-electric range as compared to the regular Prius, and fully rechargeable from a domestic source. The hybrid system includes the 2ZR-FXE, a 1.8-liter inline-four, atkinson cycle, DOHC, VVT-i gasoline engine that develops 73 kW (98 hp) at 5,200 rpm, and 142 N⋅m (105 lb⋅ft) at 4,000 rpm, a third-generation compact, lightweight hybrid transaxle, a power control unit (PCU), and an on-board charging system.

Like the Hybrid Synergy Drive of the standard third-generation Prius, the plug-in has two high-output electric motors, one 60 kW (80 hp) unit (motor–generator 2, MG2) that mainly works to power the transaxle, and another smaller unit (motor–generator 1, MG1) rated at 42 kW (56 hp) that creates energy during regenerative braking and acts as a starter for the gasoline engine. Maximum motor-drive voltage is 650 volts DC.

After the electric driving range is exhausted, the plug-in switches into hybrid operation at a pre-determined state of battery charge (SOC) and operates as a conventional full hybrid with a similar efficiency of a standard Prius.

Net hybrid system output is 134 bhp, allowing the Prius Plug-in to accelerate from 0 to 100 km/h (0 to 62 mph) in 9.8 seconds and reach a top speed of 180 km/h (112 mph). The maximum speed in EV mode is 100 km/h (62 mph), or 85 km/h (53 mph) on European models. With a weight of approximately 1,420 kg (3,130 lb), the plug-in version is only 50 kg (110 lb) heavier than the regular Prius.

The Prius Plug-in has three drive modes, all-electric (EV), and two hybrid modes: Eco and Power. The EV mode is user-selectable and when running in this mode the hybrid engine control unit (ECU) operates the vehicle using only the larger motor–generator (MG2) if pre-determined parameters are satisfied, such as sufficient battery state of charge (SOC) and vehicle speed within EV mode range. The Eco mode is designed to maximize fuel savings for any driving conditions and modifies or smooths out the electronic throttle control program to reduce throttle response, reducing the throttle opening to a maximum of 11.6%, and also modifies the operation of the air conditioning system. As an additional benefit, the Eco mode improves performance in low-traction conditions because the reduced output helps to minimize wheel skidding such as those caused by ice and snow. Power mode increases throttle response in the middle range more than normal.

==== Battery and range ====
The production version was unveiled at the September 2011 Frankfurt Motor Show with a lithium-ion battery pack that stores 4.4 kWh. Toyota estimates that the all-electric range varies between 16 and 24 km (10 and 15 miles) on a full charge depending on quick acceleration and braking, road and vehicle conditions, or climate control use. The lithium-ion battery pack can be charged in 180 minutes at 120 volts or in 90 minutes at 240 volts.

Under the JC08 Japanese test cycle the Prius PHV range is 26.4 km (16.4 miles), 3 km (1.9 miles) more than the 23.4 km (14.5 miles) achieved by the demonstrator. The United States Environmental Protection Agency (EPA) issued two estimated EV range ratings to the Prius Plug-in. A driving range for blended operation electric-gasoline of 11 miles (18 km) until the battery is depleted. The second rating is for all-electric operation with a range of 6 miles (10 km). EPA estimated a total range of 540 miles (870 km) until both sources of power are depleted. The regular gasoline-only Prius has an EPA estimated range of 536 miles (863 km).

The 4.4 kWh lithium-ion battery developed for the Prius Plug-in fits under the rear cargo floor and weighs 80 kg (180 lb). As a comparison, the nickel-metal hydride battery of the third-generation Prius, which has a capacity of only 1.3 kWh, weighs 42 kg (93 lb). A full charge using an external AC outlet takes approximately 2.5 to 3 hours from a standard North American 120 V 15 A household outlet, or 1.5 hours using a standard European 230 V household outlet. The battery requires approximately 3.2 kWh of electricity plus 1.1 L; 0.25 imp gal (0.3 US gal) of gasoline to provide 40 km (25 miles) of range. The included charging cable connects to the charging port inlet located on the right-rear fender. The charge port location was moved from the front driver-side fender in the demonstration model based on input from the program participants. The battery charger cable weighs just 1.70 kg (3.75 lb), is 7.3 m (24 ft) in length, and fits in its own compartment in the trunk area. The charge port provides LED (Light Emitting Diode) illumination for convenient night-time charging. A timer allows charging to take place during off-peak hours and can be set for either a start or end time.

==== Fuel economy ====
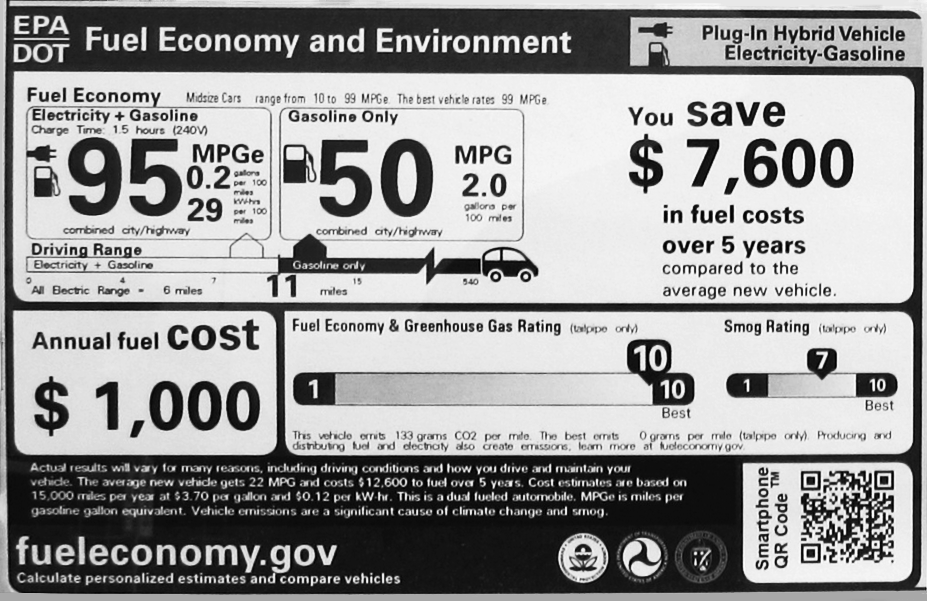
EPA/DOT fuel economy and environment sticker for the 2012 Toyota Prius Plug-in Hybrid

According to Toyota the Prius plug-in was expected to be rated at 2.10 L/100 km (112 mpg_{‑US}; 135 mpg_{‑imp}) and CO_{2} emissions of 49 g/km under the New European Driving Cycle (NEDC).

The EPA's official fuel economy rating is 95 mpg‑e (35 kW⋅h/100 mi; 22 kW⋅h/100 km) in blended mode and a combined city/highway rating of 50 mpg_{‑US} (4.7 L/100 km; 60 mpg_{‑imp}) in hybrid mode, the same as the third-generation Prius liftback. The Prius PHEV overall EV mode/hybrid fuel economy is higher than the Honda Accord Plug-in Hybrid and both Ford Energi models, but lower than the BMW i3 REx, Chevrolet Volt and the Cadillac ELR.

Based on the JC08 Japanese test cycle, the Prius PHV fuel efficiency is 61.0 km/L (143 mpg-US, 1.64 L/100 km), calculated from combined all-electric (EV) and hybrid (HV) driving modes, with only 38 g/km of CO_{2} emissions. The electric power consumption rate is 8.74 km/kWh. After the battery has been depleted, the HV mode fuel efficiency is 31.6 km/L (74.3 mpg-US, 3.16 L/100 km).

The EPA's 2014 edition of the "Light-Duty Automotive Technology, Carbon Dioxide Emissions, and Fuel Economy Trends" introduced utility factors for plug-in hybrids to represent the percentage of miles that are driven using electricity by an average driver, in electric only or blended modes. The Prius PHV has a factor of 29%, compared with 83% for the BMW i3 REx, 66% for the Chevrolet Volt, 45% for the Ford Energi models, and 33% for the Honda Accord Plug-in Hybrid.

In July 2014 Toyota set a record for the most fuel efficient lap around the Nürburgring racetrack in Germany, with a Prius Plug-in achieving a fuel consumption figure of 0.405 L/100 km (581 mpg_{‑US}; 698 mpg_{‑imp}) over the course of one lap.

==== Tailpipe emissions ====
The EPA rating for the model year 2012 through 2015 Prius PHEV tailpipe emissions is 133 grams of CO_{2} per mile, (83 CO_{2} g/km). The EPA also accounted for the upstream CO_{2} emissions associated with the production and distribution of electricity required to charge the vehicle. Since electricity production in the United States varies significantly from region to region, the EPA considered three scenarios/ranges with the low end of the range corresponding to the California powerplant emissions factor, the middle of the range represented by the national average powerplant emissions factor, and the upper end of the range corresponding to the powerplant emissions factor for the Rockies. The following table shows the Prius PHEV tailpipe emission plus total upstream CO_{2} emissions for the three scenarios, compared with other six popular plug-in hybrids and the average gasoline-powered car:

Comparison of tailpipe and upstream CO_{2} emissions^{(1)} estimated by EPA for popular MY 2014 plug-in hybrids available in the U.S. market as compared with the Prius Plug-in Hybrid
Vehicle	EPA rating combined EV/hybrid (mpg-e)	Utility factor^{(2)} (share EV miles)	Tailpipe CO_{2} (g/mi)	Tailpipe + Total Upstream CO2		
Vehicle	EPA rating combined EV/hybrid (mpg-e)	Utility factor^{(2)} (share EV miles)	Tailpipe CO_{2} (g/mi)	Low (g/mi)	Avg (g/mi)	High (g/mi)
Toyota Prius Plug-in Hybrid	58	0.29	133	195	221	249
BMW i3 REx^{(3)}	88	0.83	40	134	207	288
Chevrolet Volt	62	0.66	81	180	249	326
Cadillac ELR	54	0.65	91	206	286	377
Ford Fusion Energi/Ford C-Max Energi	51	0.45	129	219	269	326
Honda Accord Plug-in Hybrid	57	0.33	130	196	225	257
Average MY 2014 gasoline car	24.2	0	367	400	400	400
Notes: (1) Based on 45% highway and 55% city driving. (2) The utility factor represents, on average, the percentage of miles that will be driven using electricity (in electric only and blended modes) by an average driver. (3) The EPA classifies the i3 REx as a series plug-in hybrid

==== Safety ====
In the United States, the Prius Plug-in includes Toyota's Vehicle Proximity Notification System (VPNS), which is designed to alert pedestrians, the blind, and others of the vehicle's presence due to significant noise reduction typical of a hybrid vehicle traveling at low speeds in EV mode. This type of warning device is mandated by the Pedestrian Safety Enhancement Act of 2010. The warning sound is generated by externally mounted speakers and it activates automatically only at speeds below about 24 km/h (15 mph). The pitch varies with the vehicle's speed to give pedestrians a sense of whether the approaching Prius is accelerating or decelerating.

Fire incident

During the storm and subsequent flooding caused by Hurricane Sandy in October 2012, one Prius Plug-in and 16 Fisker Karmas caught fire while being parked at Port Newark-Elizabeth Marine Terminal. The vehicles were partially submerged by flash floods caused by the hurricane. In the Toyota lot, one Prius Plug-in burned, and two other Priuses, a conventional hybrid and a plug-in, just smoldered. A Toyota spokeswoman said the fire, "likely started because saltwater got into the electrical system". She also clarified that the incident affected only three out of the more than 2,128 plug-in or hybrid models at the terminal during the storm.

==== Other features ====
The Prius Plug-in Hybrid shares many of the same exterior and interior design elements as the standard 2012 Prius, keeping the coefficient of drag at Cd=0.25. Among the design features exclusive to the plug-in are: unique chrome grille and bumper trim, chrome door handles, unique 15-inch alloy wheels, blue-accented headlamps, a distinct tail lamp design, and a new Hybrid Synergy Drive Plug-in badge.

In the United States the Prius Plug-in Hybrid is available in two models, the standard Prius Plug-in and the Prius Plug-in Advanced, and offered in five exterior colors. The standard trim level includes all the features of the 2012 Prius Two Liftback grade, plus some features from the Prius Three and Prius Four grades. Standard features include heated front seats, remote air conditioning system (which can run either off the grid while the vehicle is plugged in or off the battery like the third-generation Prius), a charger timer, EV/ECO/POWER modes, three-door smart key with push-button start, new touch-screen display audio with navigation and an integrated backup camera, Toyota Entune, and LED daytime running lights. Additional features of the Prius Plug-in Advanced include head-up display, LED headlamps, softex interior seat trim, eight-way adjustable power driver seat, JBL premium audio and HDD navigation system and exclusive Entune Plug-in Hybrid Applications for smartphones. Additional safety features in the Advanced model include the Pre-Collision System with Dynamic Radar Cruise Control and Safety Connect system.

== Second generation (XW50; 2016) ==
Second generation (XW50)
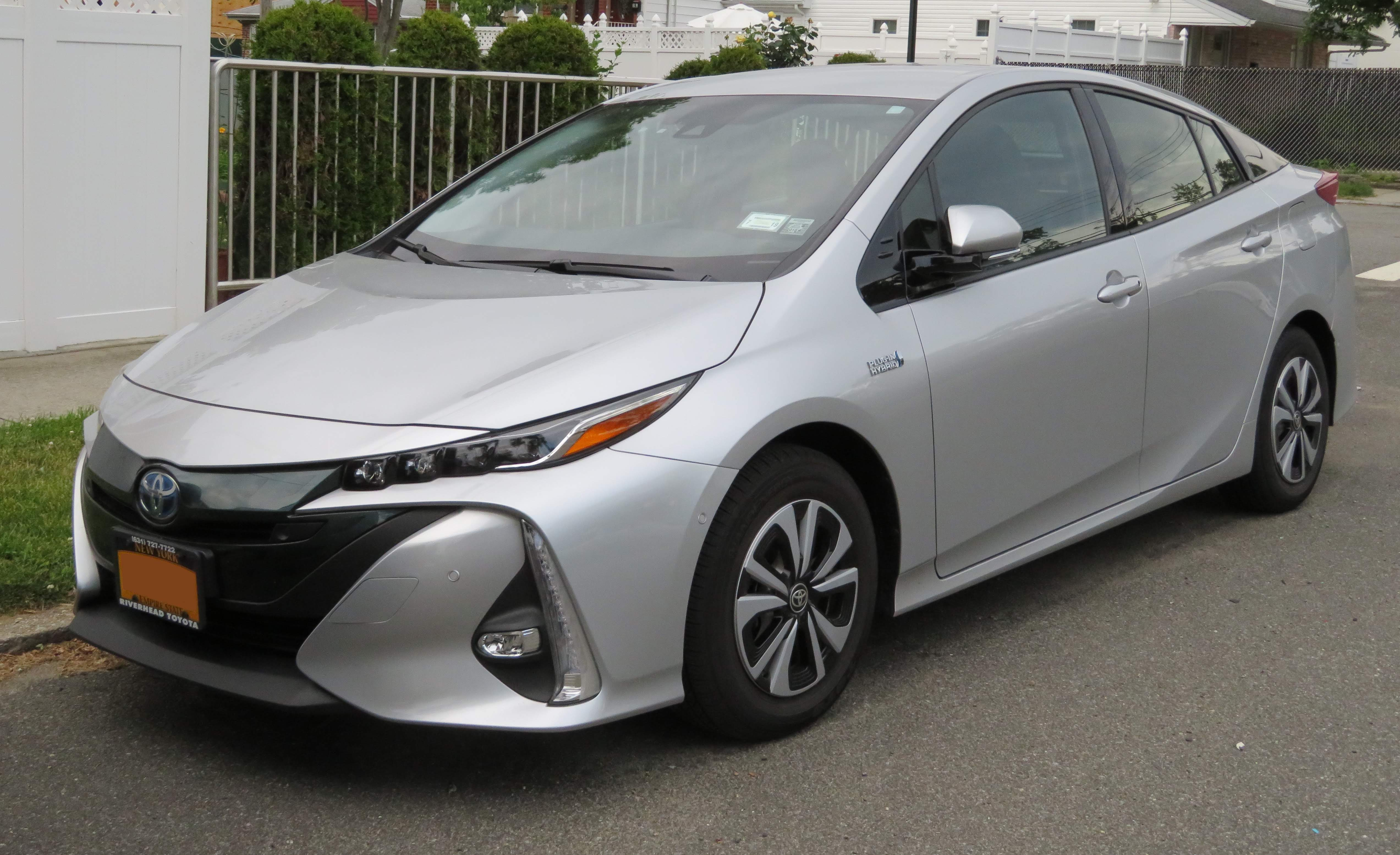
- 2017 Toyota Prius Prime

Overview
- Also called: Toyota Prius Prime (North America, South Korea, and New Zealand)
- Production: November 2016 – 2022
- Model years: 2017–2022
- Assembly: Japan: Toyota, Aichi (Tsutsumi plant)
- Designer: Shunsaku Kodama (2012)

Body and chassis
- Platform: TNGA: GA-C
- Related: Toyota Prius (XW50)

Powertrain
- Engine: 1.8 L 2ZR-FXE I4 (gasoline hybrid)
- Electric motor: Dual motor–generator (MG) system: MG1 (model 1SM): 23 kW (31 hp); MG2 (model 1NM): 53 kW (71 hp)
- Transmission: Planetary gear eCVT
- Hybrid drivetrain: Power-split PHEV (Hybrid Synergy Drive)
- Battery: 8.8 kWh lithium-ion battery
- Range: 1,030 km (640 mi)
- Electric range: 40 km (25 mi) (EPA)
- Plug-in charging: 3.3 kW 100–240 V onboard charger for 1Φ 16 A using SAE J1772 or Type 2 connector

Dimensions
- Wheelbase: 2,700.0 mm (106.3 in)
- Length: 4,645.7 mm (182.9 in)
- Width: 1,760.2 mm (69.3 in)
- Height: 1,470.7 mm (57.9 in)
- Curb weight: 1,526 kg (3,365 lb)

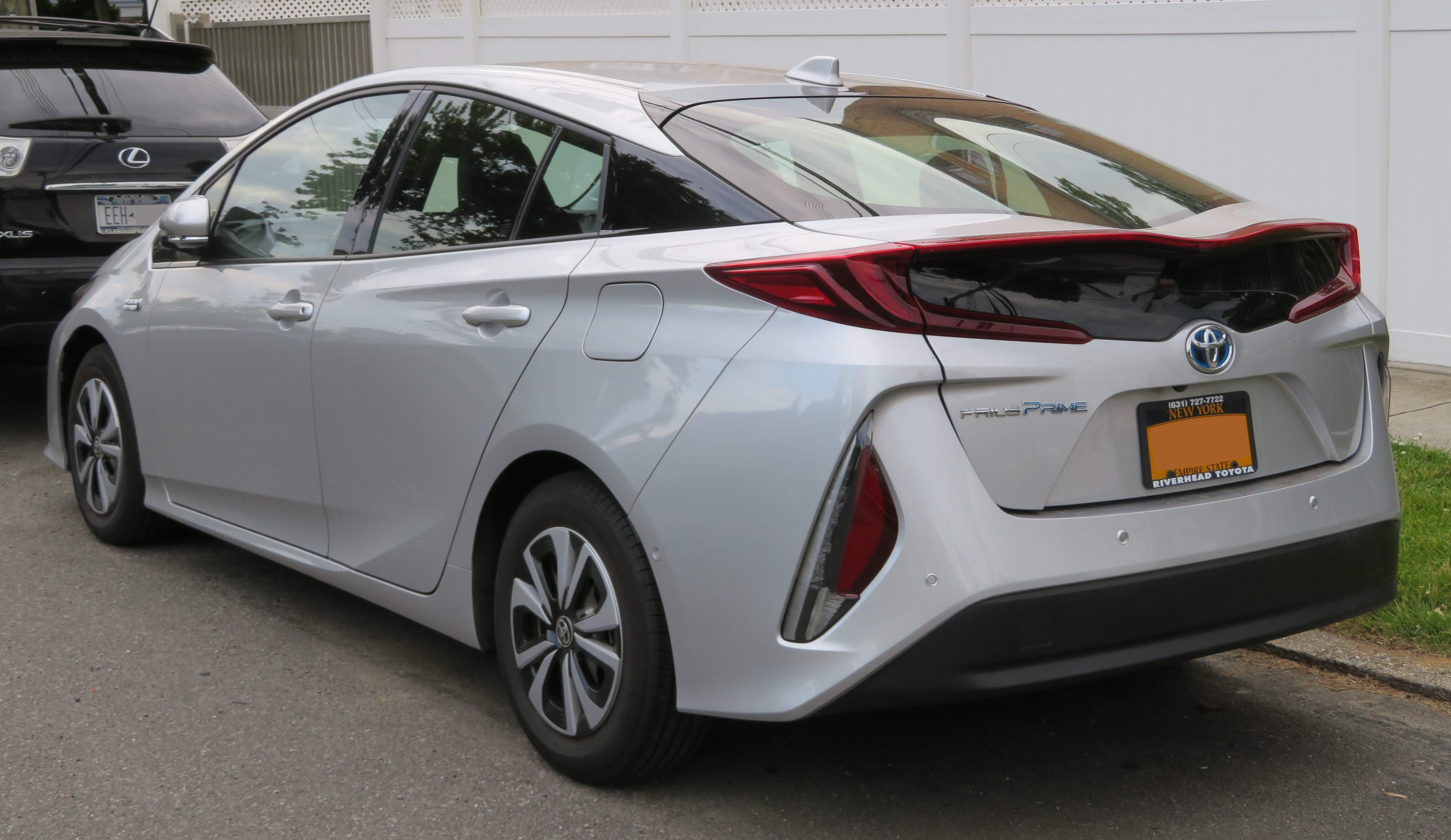
Prius Prime rear view

The second-generation Prius plug-in is called the Prius Prime in the United States, Canada, South Korea and New Zealand and Prius PHV in Japan and Europe. It was first available for sale in late 2016. It has an EPA-rated all-electric range of 40 km (25 mi), over twice the range of the first-generation model. The EPA-rated fuel economy is 133 mpg‑e (25.3 kW⋅h/100 mi) in all-electric mode, 40% more than the first-generation model, and the highest mpg-e rating in EV mode of any EPA-rated vehicle with an internal combustion engine. It is based on the fourth-generation Toyota Prius (model XW50) outfitted with a drive system powered by an 8.8 kWh lithium-ion battery. Retail deliveries of the Prime began in the United States in November 2016, and it was released in the Japanese market in February 2017.

In August 2013, just months after that the first-generation Prius Plug-in Hybrid went on sale, Toyota announced that the company was already working to develop the fourth-generation Prius (XW50). They also announced that unlike the prior generation, where the plug-in battery was added to the existing Prius, the second-generation plug-in would be developed in parallel with the standard Prius model. One of the major issues Toyota wanted to correct with the new-generation plug-in was to add additional all-electric range.

Both the fourth-generation standard Prius and the second-generation plug-in would benefit from advances in battery, electric motor and gasoline engine technologies that would enable significantly improved fuel economy and driving performance, in a more compact package that is lighter in weight and lower in cost. The next Prius models would use improved batteries with higher energy density, smaller electric motors with higher power density, and the gasoline engine would feature thermal efficiency greater than 40% (the third-generation Prius was 38.5%).

The second-generation Prius plug-in hybrid, known as the Toyota Prius Prime in the US, Canada, South Korea and New Zealand, was unveiled at the March 2016 New York International Auto Show. Retail deliveries of the Prius Prime began in the US in November 2016, and, unlike the first-generation model, it was available in all 50 states. Toyota sales target for the US is about 20,000 Prius Prime models annually. The second-generation Prius PHV was released in the Japanese market in February 2017, with a sales target of more than 30,000 units per year.

The second-generation's EPA-estimated all-electric range is 40 km (25 mi), twice the range of the first-generation model. Its EPA rating is 133 mpg‑e (25.3 kW⋅h/100 mi; 15.7 kW⋅h/100 km), the highest mpg-e rating in all-electric mode of any vehicle with an internal combustion engine. The final mpg-e is a 40% improvement over the first-generation model, and higher than the 120 mpg-e that Toyota was targeting. Toyota was also able to make the fuel economy in hybrid mode equal to the regular fourth-generation Prius liftback. Unlike its predecessor, the Prime runs entirely on electricity while in EV mode.

The 2017 through 2019 model years had a four-seat cabin layout with a center console between the rear seats. During the mid-generation refresh for the 2020 model year, Toyota replaced the center console with a seat, allowing 5 passengers to sit in the vehicle.

=== Specifications ===
==== Drivetrain ====
Like the related fourth-generation Toyota Prius, the plug-in version of the Prius is powered by Toyota's Hybrid Synergy Drive (HSD) powertrain with a 1.8 L 2ZR-FXE straight-4, atkinson cycle gasoline engine with port-injection coupled with a dual motor generator drive system linked to a lithium-ion battery pack. The Prius Prime has a 8.8 kWh battery pack that is much larger than the 0.75 kWh pack used in the regular Prius. Unlike the traditional Prius, the plug-in version is capable of using both motor–generators as traction motors while in all-electric mode.

Compared to the first-generation Toyota Prius Plug-in, the improved technology in the second-generation allows the vehicle to achieve a maximum of 68 kW (91 hp) from the electric motor system in EV mode. Those improvements allow the vehicle to run entirely on electricity while in charge-depleting (EV) in nearly all situations, raise the maximum all-electric speed from 100 km/h (62 mph) to 135 km/h (84 mph), and offer acceleration nearly as strong as blended mode to address the concern that the previous-generation car that wouldn't have enough torque for safety if the gasoline engine were entirely kept out of the power flow.

==== Battery and range ====
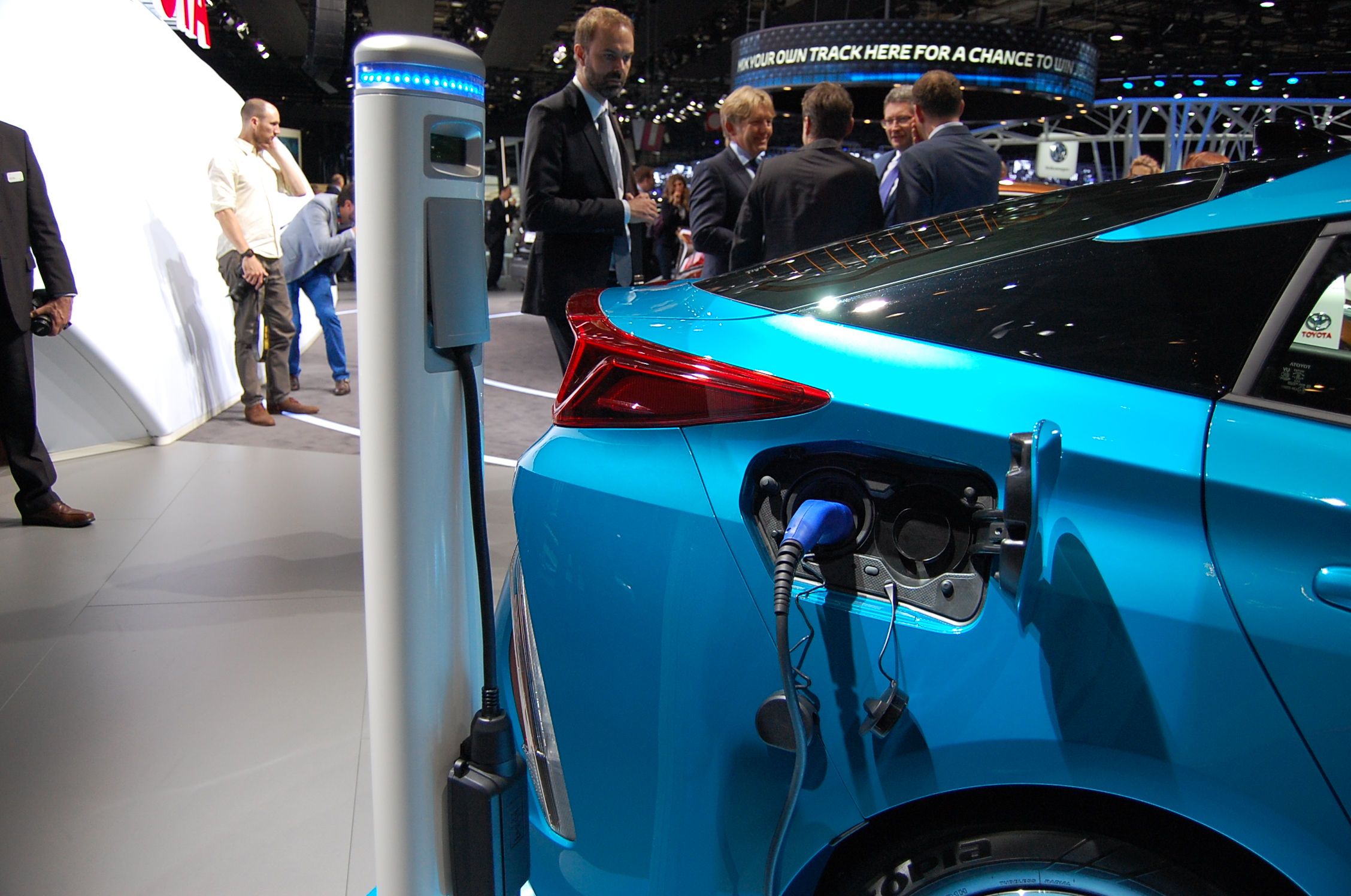
Prius Prime charging port

The second-generation plug-in has an 8.8-kilowatt-hour (32 MJ) lithium-ion battery that delivers an EPA-rated all-electric range of 25 miles (40 km). The all-electric range is more than double that of the first-generation Prius Plug-in Hybrid, but lags behind the Hyundai Ioniq Plug-in, Hyundai Sonata PHEV and the Chevrolet Volt. On one full tank of gasoline and a full electric charge, the total range of the vehicle is 1,030 km (640 miles).

The 120 kg (265 lb) forced-air-cooled battery pack made by Panasonic is located under the back seat and the rear cargo floor. To keep up with the demands of charging the larger pack, the onboard charger was upgraded to 3.3 kW, up from 2.2 kW in the Prius Plug-in. The lithium-ion battery pack can be charged in 5.5 hours at 120 volts, or 2.2 hours at 240 volts.

In Japan, the Prius PHV offers an optional solar roof charging system that adds up to 6.1 km (3.8 miles) of range per day.

==== Fuel economy ====
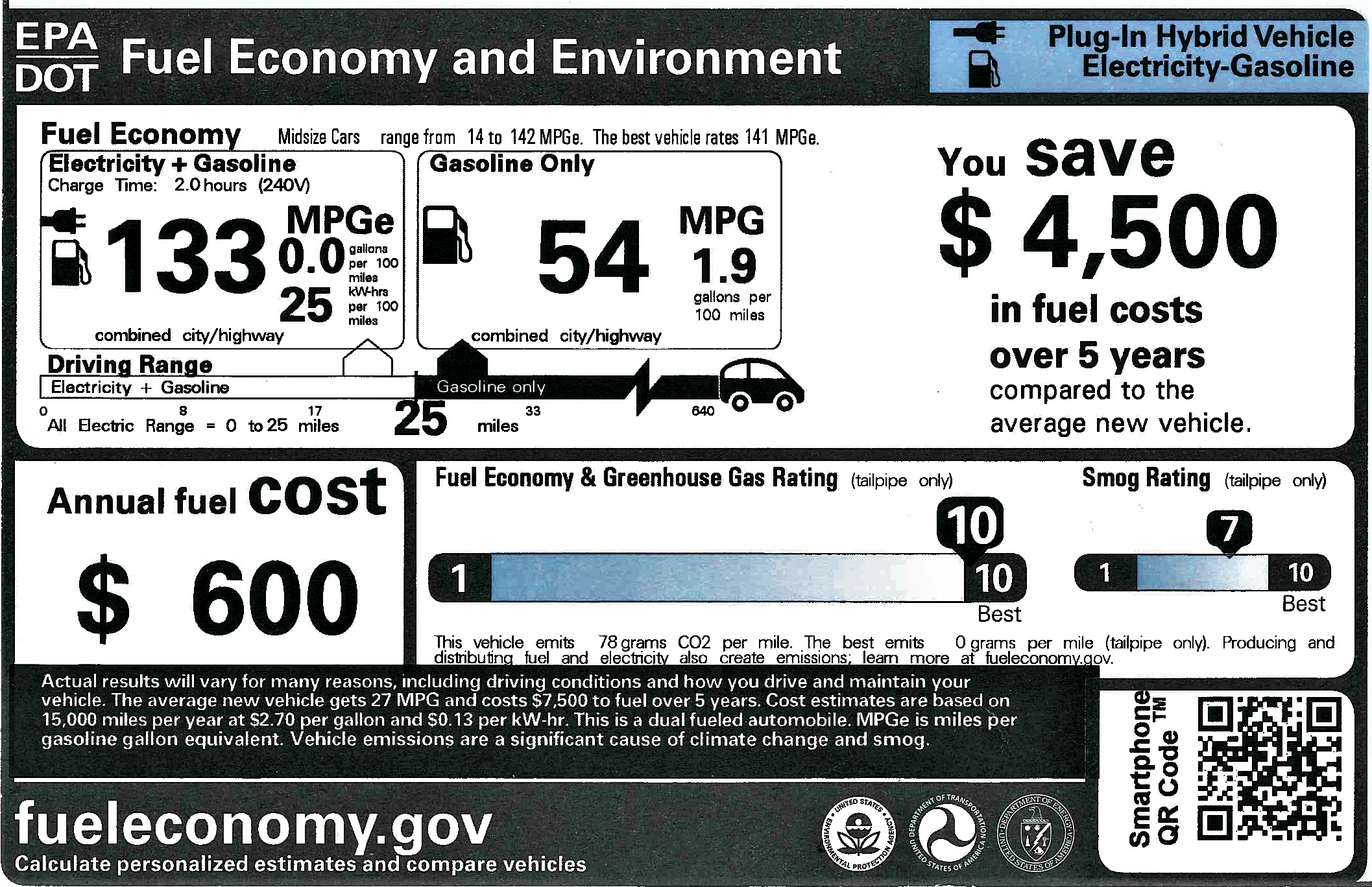
EPA/DOT fuel economy and environment sticker for the 2021 Toyota Prius Prime

The Prius Prime has an EPA fuel economy rating of 133 mpg‑e (25.3 kW⋅h/100 mi) in all-electric mode (EV mode), the highest mpg-e rating of any vehicle with an internal combustion engine, making the Prime the most energy-efficient plug-in hybrid when operating in EV mode. Compared to all-electric cars, only the Hyundai Ioniq Electric and Tesla Model 3 Standard Range have a higher energy efficiency.

Toyota was also able to make the fuel economy in hybrid mode nearly equal to the regular fourth-generation Prius liftback, despite the extra weight of the much larger battery pack. When operating in hybrid mode, the Prius Prime has an EPA-rated combined fuel economy of 4.4 L/100 km (54 mpg_{‑US}; 65 mpg_{‑imp}), 4.3 L/100 km (55 mpg_{‑US}; 66 mpg_{‑imp}) in city driving, and 4.4 L/100 km (53 mpg_{‑US}; 64 mpg_{‑imp}) in highway. Only the Prius Eco has a higher EPA-rated fuel economy rating in hybrid mode.

The high fuel economy is enabled by several weight-saving design changes compared to the regular Prius: the hood is made from aluminum and the rear hatch is made from carbon-fiber-reinforced polymer. Additionally, the rear hatch uses a "dual-wave" curved glass design to help cut drag.

=== GR Sport trim level ===
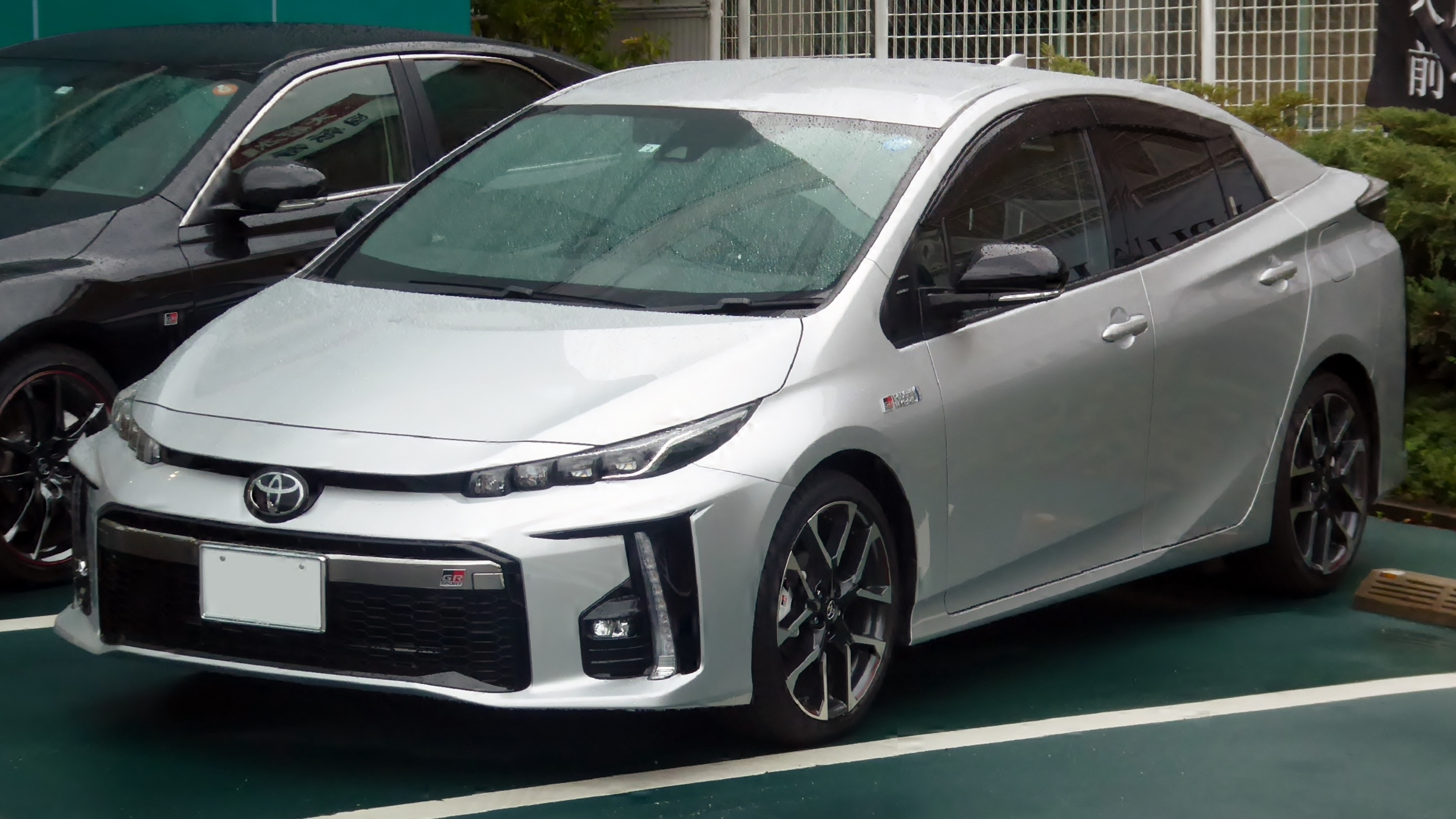
Prius PHV GR Sport

In Japan, a performance oriented GR Sport trim level of the Prius PHV was released on 19 September 2017 with a starting price of ¥3,711,960 (around US$33,000 at 2021 exchange rates). The GR Sport Package includes suspension tuning, additional bracing, a digital tachometer, a different shift knob, aluminium pedals, and a small diameter steering wheel. On the exterior, the Prius PHV GR Sport received a custom front bumper with much larger LED accents and a black grille and a custom rear bumper with extra lights and an F1-style brake light. Additionally, the Prius PHV GR Sport gained side skirts and bigger wheels. The Prius PHV GR Sport retains the plug-in hybrid powertrain of the stock Prius PHV, with no modifications.

=== Mid-generation refresh ===
In 2019, Toyota released a mid-generation refresh for the 2020 model year. The trim levels were renamed from Plus, Premium, and Advanced, to LE, XLE, and Limited, respectively, which puts the trim level structure in line with the rest of Toyota's lineup. Across all trims, SiriusXM satellite radio and Apple CarPlay were added as standard features. In the front of the car, the sun visors added extenders and the placement of the seat heater switches was made more prominent for better usability. The gloss white plastic found in the center console and steering wheel was replaced with gloss black for all trim levels. In the rear cabin, the middle console was replaced by a seat, allowing 5 passengers to sit in the vehicle, and two USB charging ports were added.

== Third generation (XW60; 2023) ==
Third generation (XW60)
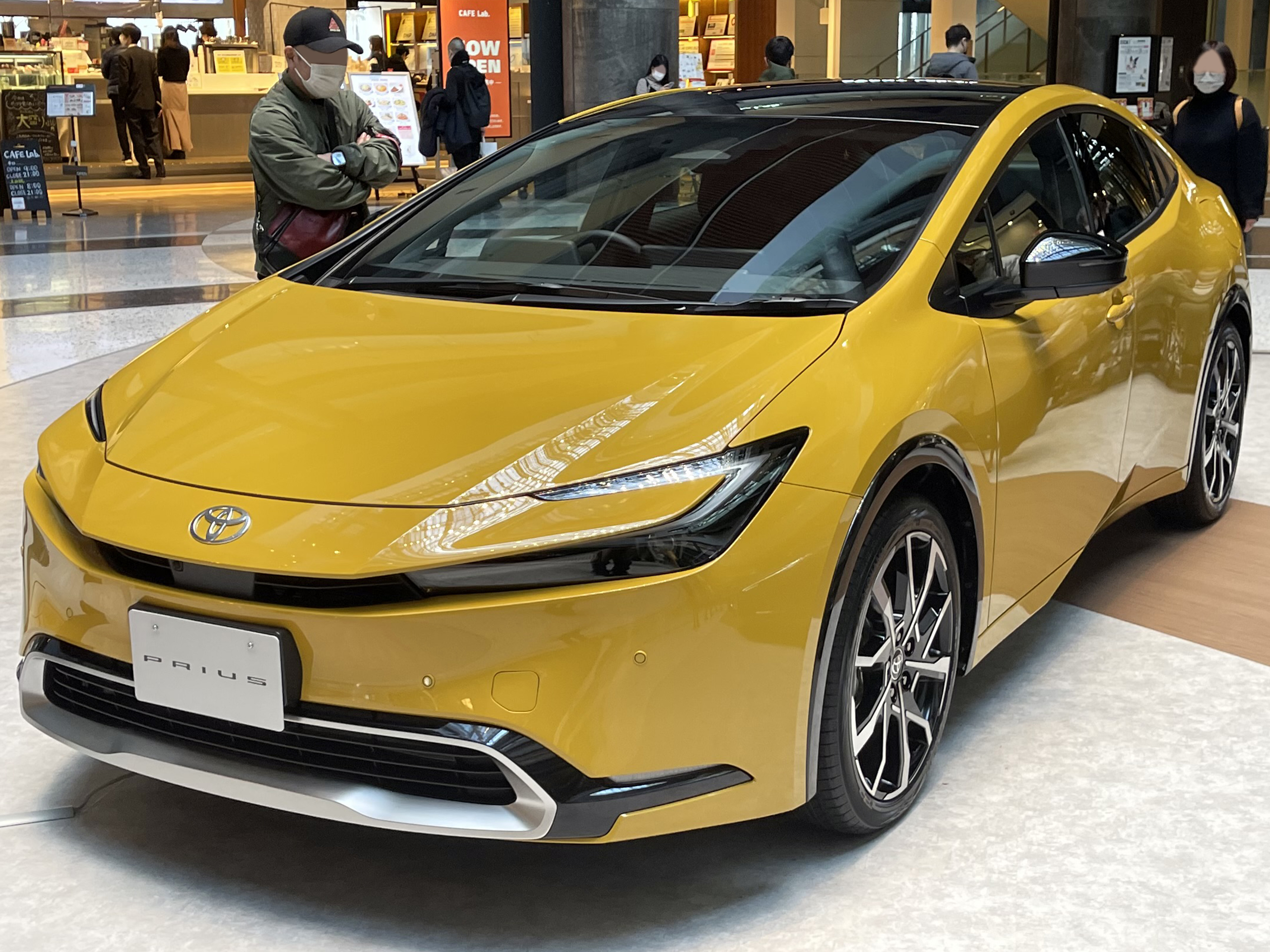

Overview
- Also called: Toyota Prius Prime (North America, 2023–2024)
- Production: March 2023 – present
- Model years: 2023–present
- Assembly: Japan: Toyota, Aichi (Tsutsumi plant)

Body and chassis
- Platform: TNGA: GA-C
- Related: Toyota Prius (XW60); Toyota C-HR (AX20)

Powertrain
- Engine: 2.0 L M20A-FXS I4 (gasoline hybrid)
- Electric motor: Dual motor–generator (MG) system
- Power output: 111 kW (149 hp; 151 PS) (engine); 120 kW (161 hp; 163 PS) (electric motor); 164 kW (220 hp; 223 PS) (combined)
- Transmission: Planetary gear eCVT
- Hybrid drivetrain: Plug-in hybrid
- Battery: 13.6 kWh lithium-ion
- Range: 965 km (600 mi) (EPA)
- Electric range: 87 km (54 mi) (WLTC); 71 km (44 mi) (EPA)
- Plug-in charging: 3.5 kW 100–240 V onboard charger for 1Φ 16 A

Dimensions
- Wheelbase: 2,750 mm (108.3 in)
- Length: 4,600 mm (181.1 in)
- Width: 1,780 mm (70.1 in)
- Height: 1,420–1,430 mm (55.9–56.3 in)
- Curb weight: 1,570–1,620 kg (3,461–3,571 lb)

The third-generation Prius Plug-in Hybrid was unveiled on 16 November 2022 for the 2022 Los Angeles Auto Show. This model is powered by a more powerful 2.0-liter M20A-FXS four-cylinder engine which is combined with the electric motor to generate a combined output of 164 kW (220 hp; 223 PS), an 82% increase over the previous generation and 13% more than the non-plug-in model, and offering a 0 to 97 km/h (0 to 60 mph) time of 6.6 seconds, according to Toyota. Because of this performance increase, in the North American market, Toyota markets the Prius Prime with its sport-oriented trim levels: SE, XSE, and XSE Premium. Unlike the second generation, but similar to the first generation, there is little external visual differentiation between the traditional Prius and the plug-in version.

Now under the back seats, the 13.6 kWh lithium-ion battery pack has a more than 50% greater capacity compared to the previous generation.

The vehicle is equipped with Toyota's updated audio multimedia system that debuted on the XK70 series Tundra and the Toyota Safety Sense (TSS) 3.0 suite of advanced driver-assistance systems. It is the first model to offer the TSS 3.0 system's Traffic Jam Assist function that allows the driver to go hands-free, with the on-board computers handling acceleration, braking, and steering under 40 km/h (25 mph). The XSE Premium trim also offers optional solar panels under its glass roof that charge the battery while the vehicle is parked and provide supplemental power for accessory functions like air conditioning while it is being driven.

=== Markets ===
==== Japan ====
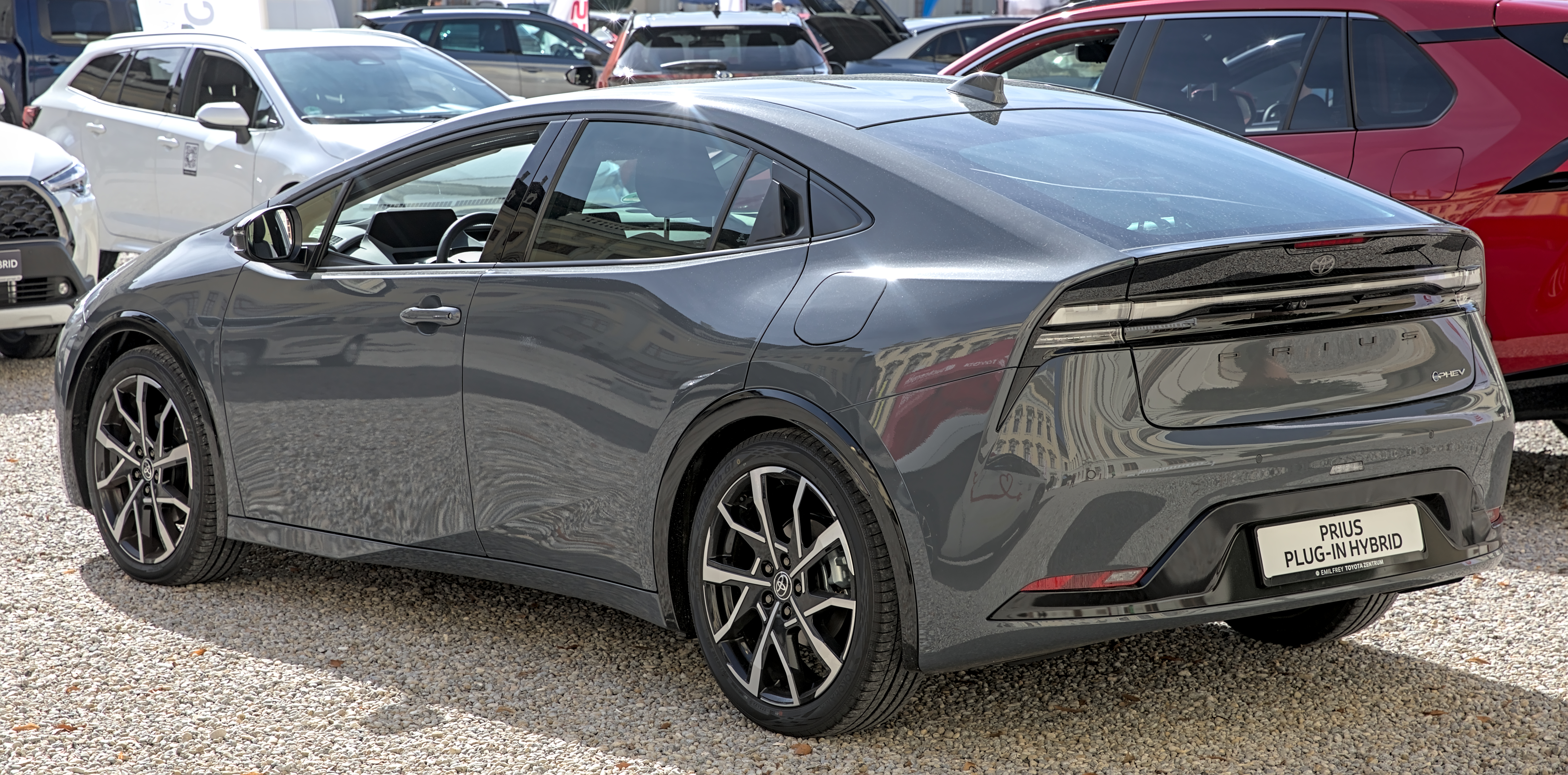
Rear view

In Japan, grade levels offered for the Prius PHEV are the G and Z, the M20A-FXS engine is standard on all trims.

==== North America ====
The North American market Prius Prime is available in three grade levels: SE, XSE, and XSE Premium. All grades are powered with the M20A-FXS engine; unlike the regular Prius, the Prius Prime only comes with FWD as standard on all trims. The manufacturer-estimated electric driving range is 70 km (44 miles) for the SE grade and 65 km (39 miles) for the XSE grades. In 2024, for the 2025 model year, the Prius Prime was renamed Prius Plug-in Hybrid.

==== Europe ====
For the European market, the Prius Plug-in is the only version available.

=== Awards ===
In the US, in January 2024, the Prius Prime (and the regular Prius) was named the 2024 North American Car of the Year.

== Markets and sales ==
First-generation Toyota Prius Plug-in Hybrid sales by top national markets between 2012 and 2017
Country	Total sales	2017	2016	2015	2014	2013	2012
US	65,703	20,936	2,474	4,191	13,264	12,088	12,750
Japan	48,800	~26,700	148	1,344	5,187	4,452	10,970
Netherlands	4,056^{(1)}		4	81	87	2,699	1,184
UK	1,651^{(2)}		71	256	345	509	470
Sweden	1,227^{(1)}		10	132	210	376	499
France	945^{(1)}		33	68	38	393	413
Norway	390^{(1)}		3	23	37	156	171
Canada	1,102	708	0	43	76	212	63
Finland	152^{(3)}		2^{(3)}	11	21	45	73
Spain	137^{(1)}		2	11	15	51	58
Global sales	128,900	~51,000	334^{(1)}	6,507	19,879	21,381	27,279
Notes: (1) CYTD: current year-to-date sales through April 2016. (2) Total registered in the UK at the end of March 2016. (3) Sales in Finland through March 2016.

Toyota's initial global sales goal was to sell more than 60,000 Prius PHV a year, with Japan as the main market and aiming for 40,000 units, two-thirds of the carmaker's global sales goal. During its first year in the market, a total of 27,279 Prius PHVs were sold worldwide, allowing the Prius PHV to rank as the second most sold plug-in electric car for 2012. Sales in 2012 were led by the United States with 12,750 units delivered, followed by Japan with 10,970 units. In 2012, the Prius PHV was the best selling plug-in electric car in Sweden (499 units) and the top selling plug-in hybrid in the UK (470 units), France (413 units), and Norway (171 units). The top selling European market was the Netherlands, with 1,184 units sold during 2012.

Accounting for cumulative sales since its inception, the Prius PHV ranked as the world's third best selling PEV by December 2014. By May 2015, the Prius plug-in fell to fourth place after the Tesla Model S. and by November 2015 it was also surpassed in the global ranking by the Mitsubishi Outlander P-HEV, as the Prius sales declined after the end of its production in June 2015.

As of April 2016, global first-generation Prius PHVs sales totaled 75,400 units since 2012, with the North American market accounting for 56.6% of all sales. The United States led sales with 42,345 units delivered through September 2016, when dealerships run out of stock. By the end of 2016, the Prius plug-in ranked as the world's all-time third top selling plug-in hybrid after the Volt/Ampera family of vehicles, and the Mitsubishi Outlander P-HEV.

The second-generation Prius Prime was released to retail customers in the U.S. in November 2016, and in Japan in February 2017. Toyota expected to sell up to 60,000 units globally a year, with Japan accounting for more than half of those sales. Global cumulative sales of both Prius plug-in generations totaled 128,900 units at the end of 2017. Sales were led by North America with 66,800 units delivered, followed by Japan with 48,800 units sold, and the European market with cumulative sales of 13,100 units. About 200 units were sold in the rest of the world. The European market is led by the Netherlands with 4,134 units registered by the end of November 2015, followed by the UK with 1,580 units registered at the end of December 2015, and Sweden with 1,227 registrations up until April 2016. The U.S. continued as the top selling country market with 65,703 units delivered by the end of 2017. As of December 2019, cumulative sales of both Prius PHV generations totaled 209,000 units worldwide.

=== Canada ===
The Toyota Prius Plug-in was released in the Canadian market in September 2012 at a starting price of CA$35,700. During its first month in the market sold 21 units. The Prius Plug-in is eligible in several provinces for purchase rebates. According to its battery size, the Prius PHV was eligible in British Columbia for a CA$2,500 rebate starting on 1 December 2011. In Quebec the plug-in was eligible for a CA$5,000 rebate beginning on 1 January 2012, and a CA$5,000 rebate in Ontario under its Electric Vehicle Incentive Program. A total of 63 units were sold during 2012, and 212 in 2013. Cumulative sales totaled 1,102 units through December 2017.

In May 2017, Toyota Canada announced availability of the second-generation Prius Prime for the Canadian market. Initially available in both a standard and a Technology package, the model was exclusively available in Quebec (qualifying for a CA$4,000 provincial rebate) in recognition of a 60 percent increase in plug-in vehicle sales in the province during 2016. After selling more than 700 Prius Primes in Quebec, in January 2018 Toyota Canada announced a nationwide release for the Prius Prime and an additional Upgrade trim between the standard and Technology levels. It is eligible for a CA$2,500 rebate from the British Columbia government; a CA$7,100 rebate from the Ontario government was available until the cancellation of the province's cap-and-trade program in July 2018.

=== France ===
Deliveries of the Prius Plug-in Hybrid began in France in September 2012. Pricing started at €37,000 (~ US$48,275) including VAT and before any applicable government incentives. Excluding the environmental bonus, the plug in version is €9,000 (~ US$11,740) more expensive than the conventional hybrid model. The Prius PHV was the top selling plug-in hybrid in France for 2012 with 413 units registered, more than doubling Ampera sales (190). Sales were down to 393 units in 2013, and fell to 38 units in 2014. As of December 2015, registrations totaled 912 units since 2012.

Retail deliveries of the second-generation Prius PHV are scheduled to begin in June 2017. The plug-in hybrid is available only in one trim with pricing starting at €36,900 (~ US$39,200). Due to its CO_{2} emissions (22 g/km), the Prius PHV is not eligible to the government's €6,000 (~ US$6,370) ecological bonus.

=== Japan ===
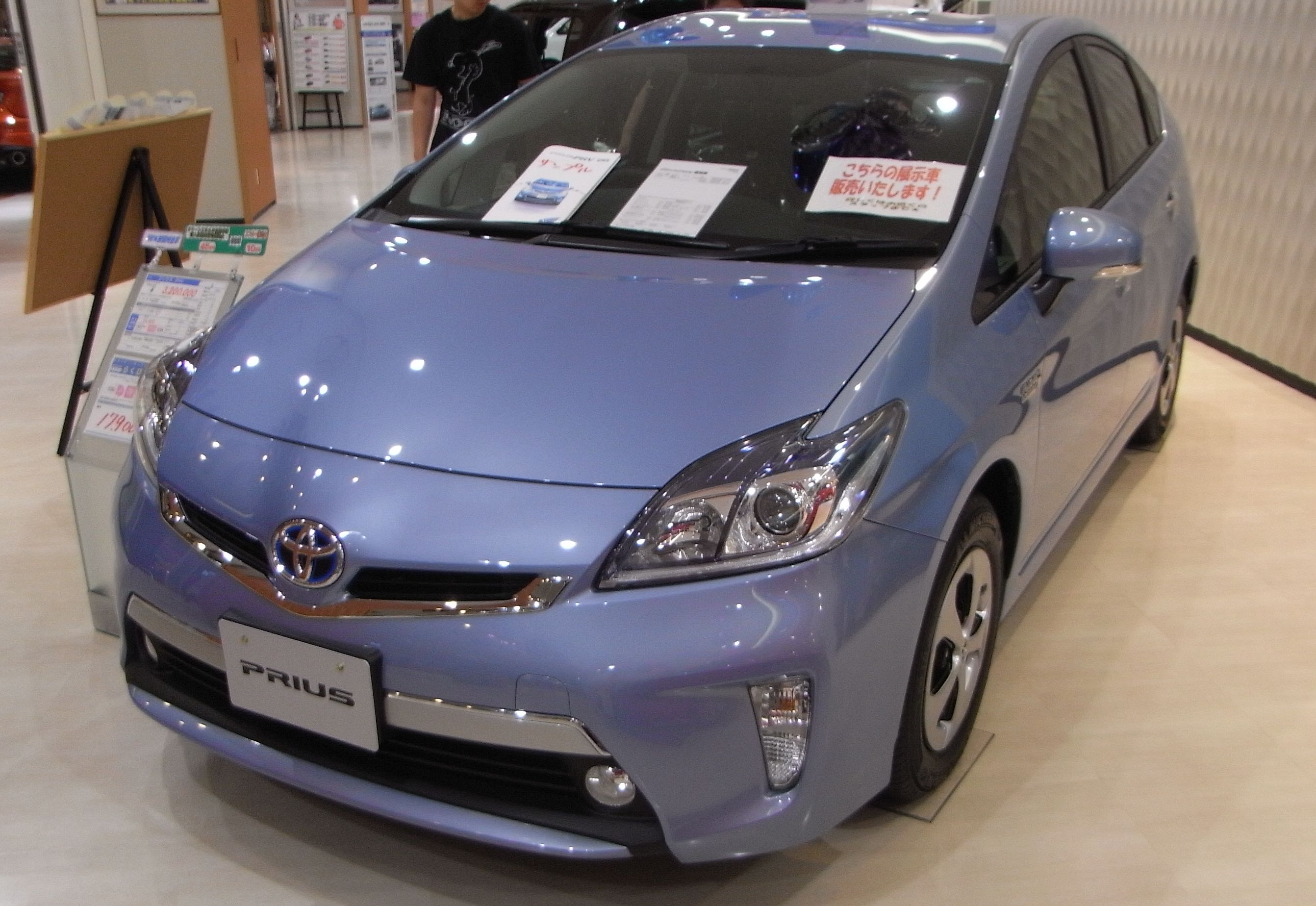
Prius PHV

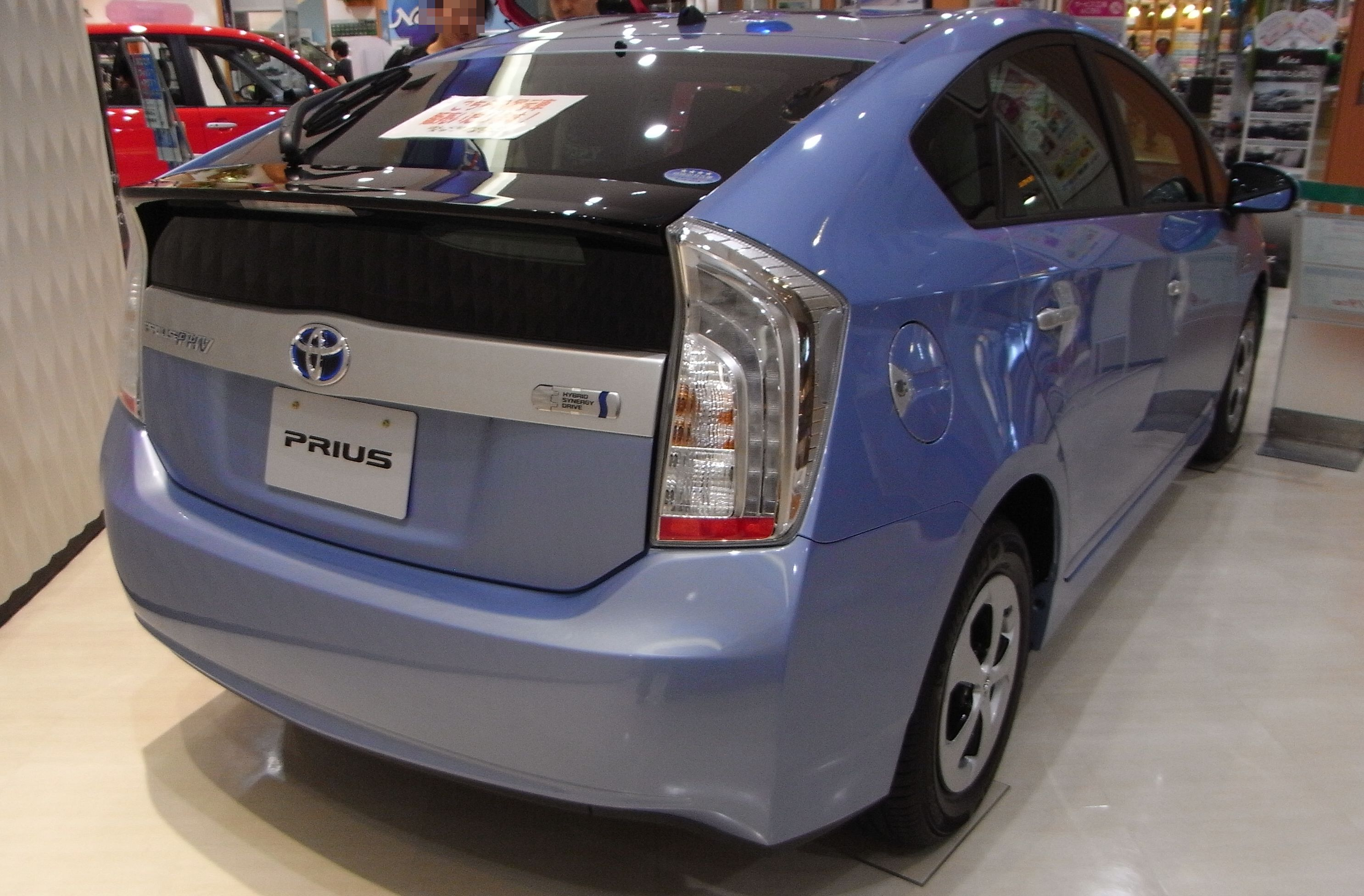
Prius PHV rear view (Japan)

Toyota began taking orders on late November 2011 and the Prius PHV was released on 30 January 2012. The price of the plug-in, including consumption tax, starts at ¥3,200,000 (US$32,930) for the entry-level S trim and goes up to ¥4,200,000 (US$43,223) for the G trim with leather option. Toyota's sales target for the Japanese market was set between 35,000 and 40,000 units per year. A total of 15,400 units had been sold between 2012 and December 2013. An additional 5,187 units were sold in 2014. Cumulative sales totaled about 22,100 first-generation models through January 2017.

In October 2013 Toyota announced upgrades and reduced pricing for the 2014 Prius PHV in the Japanese market. The model is offered in a new two-tone paint scheme, newly designed aluminium alloy wheels, LED illumination for the "PHV" and "Hybrid Synergy Drive" badges. Interior changes include a padded compartment box in the center of the dashboard for keeping the smartphone, and some dark wood grain inserts in the center console and the armrests. In addition, Toyota explained that the 2014 Prius Plug-In Hybrid is manufactured using an improved spot-welding process that results in increased structural rigidity, which reduces noise and vibration, and improve ride quality and steering feel. The Japanese-market 2014 Prius PHV is offered in four trim levels: L, S, G and G Leather Package. The base price was reduced to ¥2,850,000 (US$29,330), and the advanced model starts at ¥3,990,000 (US$41,060).

The second-generation Prius PHV was released in Japan on 15 February 2017. Toyota expected to sell more than 30,000 units a year in Japan. Sales in 2017 totaled about 26,700 units. As of December 2017, cumulative sales of both Prius plug-in generations totaled 48,800 units sold.

=== Netherlands ===
Deliveries began in August 2012. The Prius PHV pricing starts at €38,990 (~ US$52,100) and lease prices start at €599 (~ US$668) per month. The price includes installation of a charging station at home, and owners also benefit from several tax exemptions and enjoy free parking due to car's low emissions.

A total of 1,184 units were sold during 2012, making the Prius PHV the second best selling plug-in electric vehicle in the country after the Opel Ampera (2,693 units), and also making the Netherlands the top selling European market for the Prius PHV during 2012. Sales totaled 2,707 units during 2013, ranking third in the Dutch plug-in electric car segment after the Mitsubishi Outlander P-HEV (8,038) and the Volvo V60 Plug-in Hybrid (6,238). Prius PHV registrations totaled 4,134 units at the end of November 2015.

=== Sweden ===
The Prius PHEV was the top selling plug-in electric car in the country during 2012, with 499 units sold. An additional 376 units were sold in 2013, and ranked as the second most sold PEV that year. A total of 1,085 Prius PHEVs had been registered in Sweden through December 2014, ranking as the third top selling plug-in electric vehicle in the country after the Mitsubishi Outlander P-HEV (2,385) and the Volvo V60 Plug-in Hybrid (1,388). A total of 132 units were registered in 2015, and cumulative registrations totaled 1,217 units through December 2015.

=== United Kingdom ===
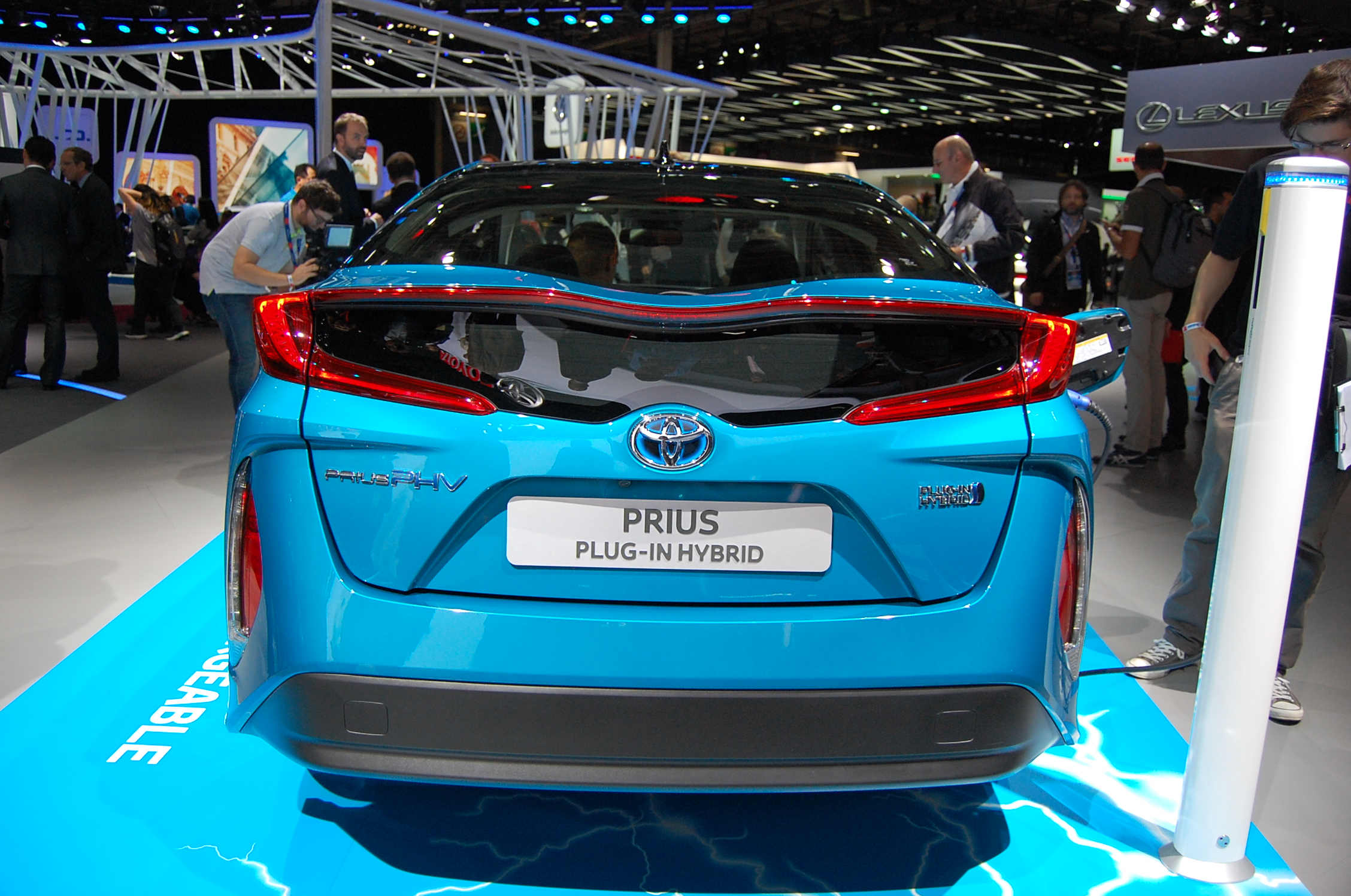
Rear badging of the European Prius PHV

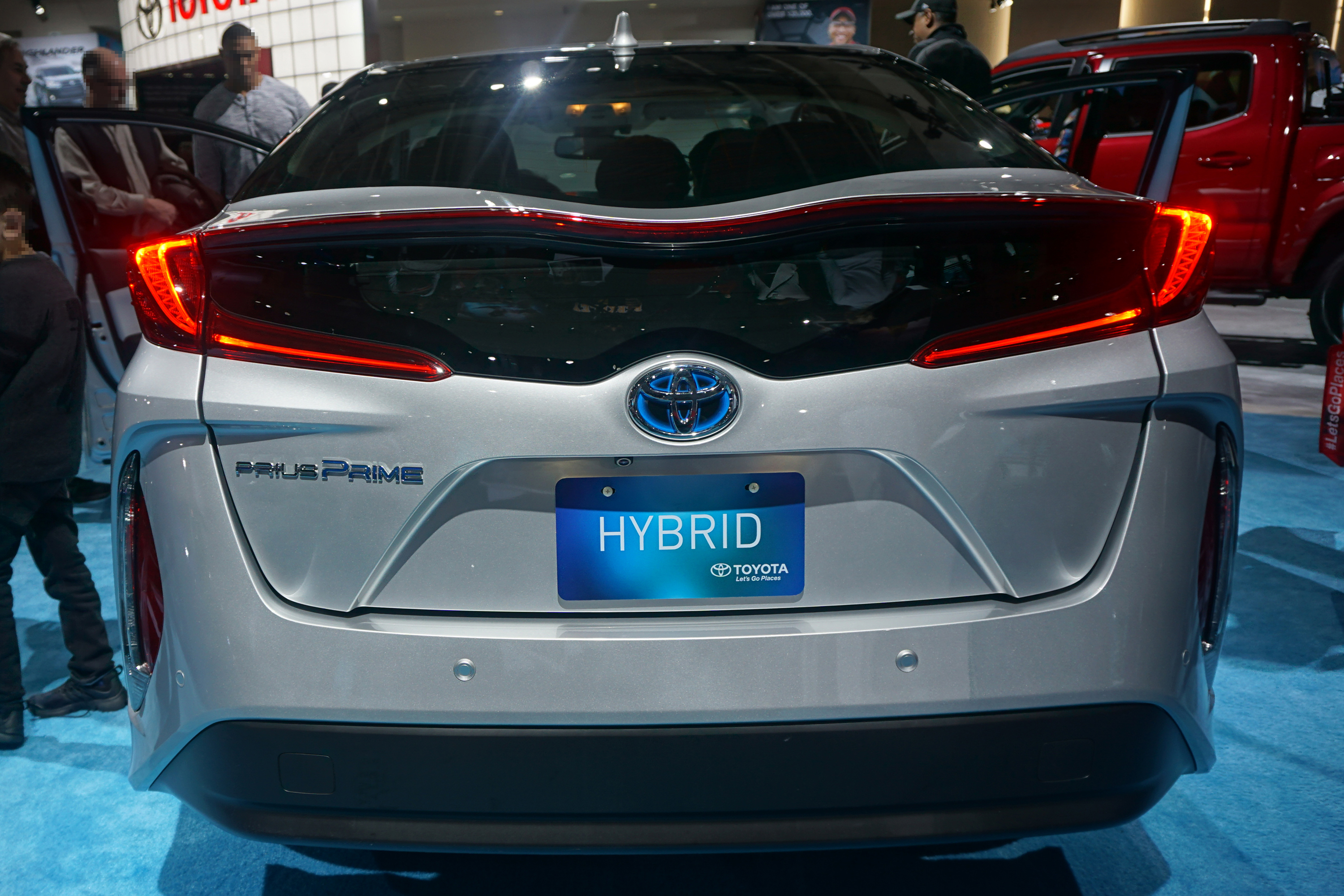
Rear badging of the U.S. Prius Prime

The Prius Plug-in pricing starts at £32,895 (~ US$52,161) before taking into account the government's £5,000 Plug-in Car Grant. After the subsidy is applied, the Prius Plug-in ends up on par with the Nissan Leaf electric car. Deliveries to fleet customers began in August 2012. As of 31 December 2012, a total of 470 units were sold since its introduction to the market in July 2012, allowing the Prius PHV to surpass the Vauxhall Ampera and ranking as the top selling plug-in hybrid in the country. In 2013 the Prius PHV ranked again as the top selling plug-in hybrid with 509 units sold, up 8.5% from 2012. Cumulative sales through December 2013 reached 979 units. As of March 2014, the Prius plug-in ranked second after the Nissan Leaf, then the British market leader, but by December 2014 it fell to fifth place among plug-in electric cars, and second place among plug-in hybrids after the Mitsubishi Outlander P-HEV. A total of 1,580 Prius PHVs were registered in the UK by the end of December 2015.

Retail deliveries of the second-generation Prius PHV are scheduled to begin in March 2017. The plug-in hybrid is available in two trims, Business Edition Plus and Excel, with pricing starting at £31,695 (~ US$39,340) for the Business Edition, and £33,895 (~ US$42,070), both, before any government's incentives. The Prius PHV is eligible for a £2,500 (~ US$3,100) purchase grant.

=== United States ===
The production Prius Plug-in Hybrid was introduced in the U.S. on 16 September 2011, at the Green Drive Expo in Richmond, California. For the 2012 and 2013 model year the sales price in the U.S. started at US$32,000 for the base model and US$39,525 for the advanced trim before any applicable government incentives. All trims had a US$760 delivery fee. In October 2013 Toyota announced a price reduction for the 2014 model year Prius Plug-in, cutting US$2,000 off the base price, and US$4,620 for the advanced version, in order to boost flagging sales. There were no changes in the vehicle content as compared to the 2013 model, and the price reduction took effect in November 2013, when deliveries of the new model year began. The 2017 Prius Prime starts at US$27,100 for the base model and US$33,100 for the advanced trim before any applicable federal government incentives and local rebates. All trims have a mandatory US$850 delivery fee.

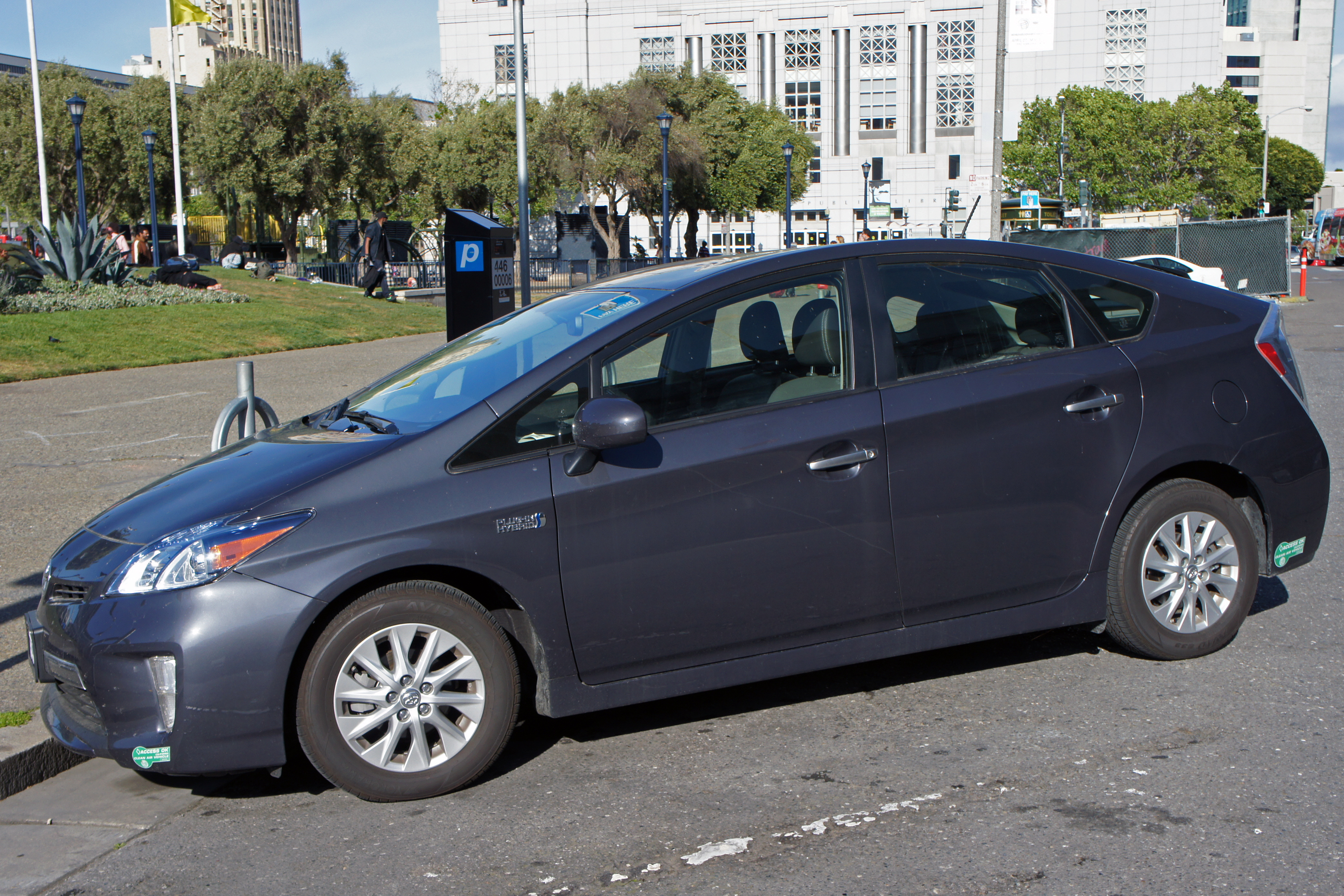
Prius Plug-in Hybrid in San Francisco with California's clean air green sticker for HOV access

Due to its battery size, the first-generation Prius Plug-in qualified for a federal tax credit of US$2,500, and also met eligibility for additional incentives at the state and local level, such as California's US$1,500 rebate. The Prius Plug-in also qualified for California's Enhanced Advanced Technology-Partial Zero-Emissions Vehicle (EAT-PZEV) status, which allowed plug-in owners to have free access to use carpool lanes even when traveling solo. The Prius Prime is eligible for federal tax credit of US$4,500 due to its larger 8.8 kWh battery. Also meets eligibility for additional incentives at the state and local level. The Prime also qualifies for California's clean air green sticker for free access to high-occupancy vehicle lanes.

On 22 April 2011 Toyota introduced its priority registration website for customers interested in ordering the Prius Plug-in Hybrid, even though the purchase price had not been announced at that time. Registration guaranteed first access to Toyota's Online Order System, which began sales in October 2011, but limited to the 14 launch states. Toyota reported that during its first month since the process began, more than 17,000 potential buyers signed up through its reservation website, by mid July 2011, 29,000 potential buyers had registered, and deposits were taken by dealers beginning in November 2011. The plug-in hybrid is available in two trims and five colors.

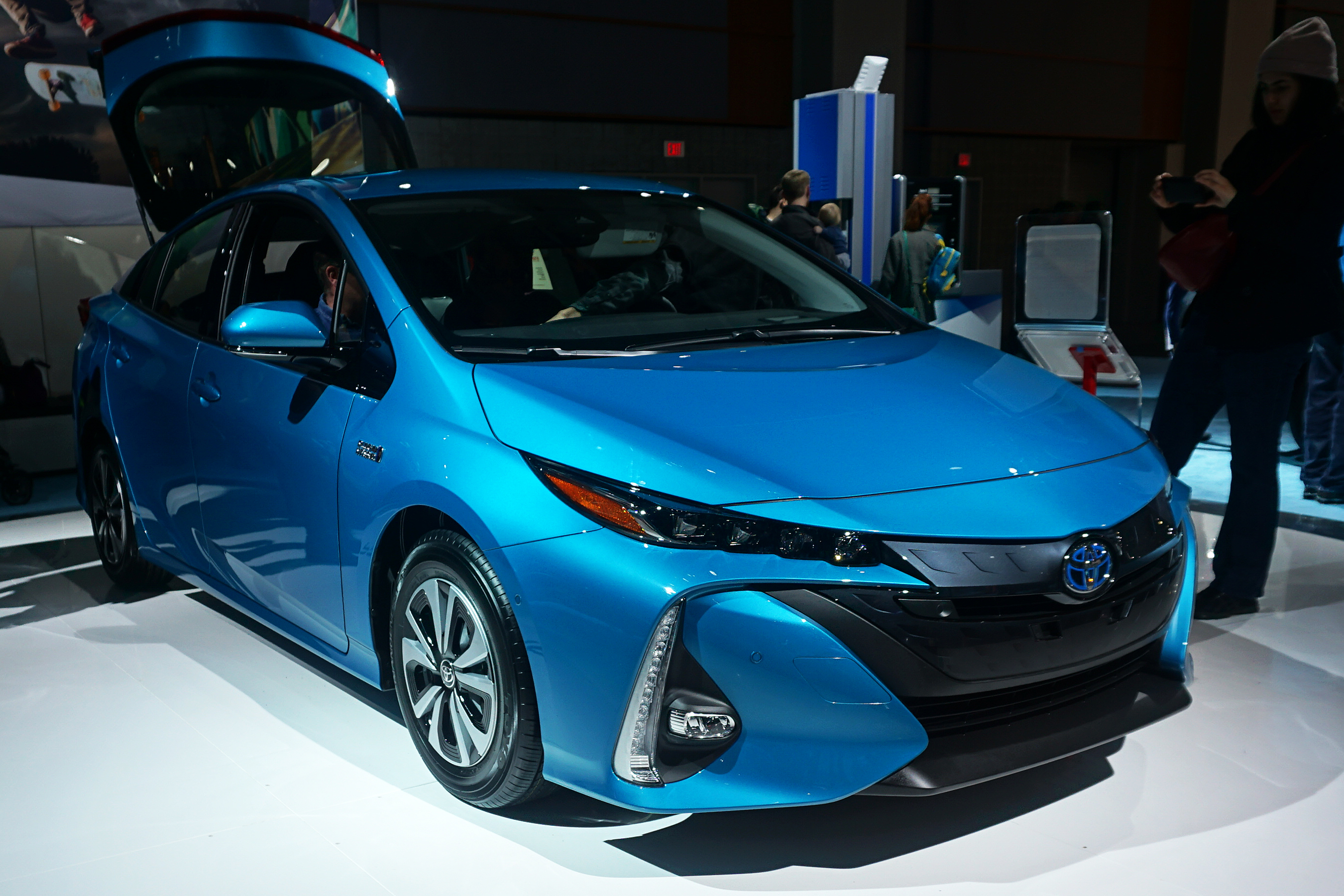
Retail deliveries of the second-generation Prius Prime began in November 2016.

Production began in January 2012, and retail deliveries began in late February 2012. Initial availability was limited, and, as of October 2013, the Prius PHV was offered only in 15 states: Arizona, California, Connecticut, Hawaii, Maine, Maryland, Massachusetts, New Hampshire, New Jersey, New York, Oregon, Rhode Island, Vermont, Virginia and Washington. According to Toyota these are the states where nearly 60% of all Prius models are currently sold in the country. The Prius Plug-in was originally advertised to become available in all remaining states in 2013; however, nationwide availability never materialized and the car was only sold in the original 15 states until its discontinuation in 2015. Toyota announced it expects to sell in the U.S. market around 15,000 units a year initially. Toyota delivered seven plug-ins in February, sold 891 units in March 2012, its first full month on the market, and in April 2012 the Prius PHV was the top selling plug-in electric car for that month.

As of October 2016, cumulative sales of first-generation Prius PHV totaled 42,345 units since 2012, ranking as the second top selling plug-in hybrid car in the U.S. after the Chevrolet Volt. Only 52 units were sold during the first three-quarters of 2016, as Toyota dealerships run out of stock in October due to the earlier end of production. Retail deliveries of the second-generation Prius Prime began in November 2016. A total of 781 units were sold during its first month in the American market, setting a new record monthly sales volume debut for any plug-in electric car released in the U.S. Combined sales of both Prius plug-in generations totaled with 65,703 units sold since inception through December 2017.

== Recognition ==
The Toyota Prius Plug-in was a finalist for the 2010 Green Car Vision Award. The Prius Plug-in won the 2012 Urban Green Vehicle of the Year Award. Shared with the Toyota Prius v, the Prius plug-in was awarded Green Car Report's Best Car to Buy 2012.

== See also ==
- Government incentives for plug-in electric vehicles
- List of modern production plug-in electric vehicles
- Plug-in electric vehicle
