= Mixed-mode chromatography =

Mixed-mode chromatography (MMC), or multimodal chromatography, refers to chromatographic methods that utilize more than one form of interaction between the stationary phase and analytes in order to achieve their separation. What is distinct from conventional single-mode chromatography is that the secondary interactions in MMC cannot be too weak, and thus they also contribute to the retention of the solutes.

== History ==
Before MMC was considered as a chromatographic approach, secondary interactions were generally believed to be the main cause of peak tailing. However, it was discovered afterwards that secondary interactions can be applied for improving separation power. In 1986, Regnier’s group synthesized a stationary phase that had characteristics of anion exchange chromatography (AEX) and hydrophobic interaction chromatography (HIC) on protein separation. In 1998, a new form of MMC, hydrophobic charge induction chromatography (HCIC), was proposed by Burton and Harding. In the same year, conjoint liquid chromatography (CLC), which combines different types of monolithic convective interaction media (CIM) disks in the same housing, was introduced by Štrancar et al. In 1999, Yates’ group [11] loaded strong-cation exchange (SCX) and reversed phase liquid chromatography (RPLC) stationary phases sequentially into a capillary column coupled with tandem mass spectrometry (MS/MS) in the analysis of peptides, which became one of the most efficient technique in proteomics afterwards. In 2009, Geng’s group first achieved online two-dimensional (2D) separation of intact proteins using a single column possessing separation features of weak-cation exchange chromatography (WCX) and HIC (termed as two-dimensional liquid chromatography using a single column, (2D-LC-1C).

== Advantages ==
Higher selectivity: for example, positive, negative and neutral substances could be separated by a reversed phase (RP)/anion-cation exchange (ACE) column in a single run. Higher loading capacity, for example, loading capacity of ACE/ hydrophilic interaction chromatography (HILIC) increased 10-100 times when compared with RPLC, which offered a new selection and idea for developing semi-preparative and preparative chromatography.

One mixed-mode column can replace two or even more single mode columns, which is economic and eco-friendly for employing the stationary phase more sufficiently and reducing the consuming and ‘waste’ of raw materials.

Single mixed-mode column can be applied for on-line two-dimensional (2D) analysis in a sealed system via establishing corresponding chromatographic system or off-line 2D analysis as two columns.

== Classification of MMC ==
MMC can be classified into physical MMC and chemical MMC. In the former method, the stationary phase is constructed of two or more types of packing materials. In the chemical method, just one type of packing material containing two or more functionalities is used.

=== Physical methods ===
The simplest approach is to connect two commercial columns in series, which is termed a “tandem column”. Another approach is “biphasic column”, by packing two stationary phases separately in two ends of the same column. The third approach is to homogenize two or more different types of stationary phases in a single column, which is termed a “hybrid column” or “mixed-bed column”.

=== Chemical methods ===
==== IEC/HIC ====
Since IEC and HIC conditions are the closest ones to physiological conditions which are fit for maintaining biological activity, the combinations of them are widely used in the separation of biological products. IEC/HIC MMC has improved separation power and selectivity on the grounds that it applies both electrostatic and hydrophobic interactions.

==== IEC/RPLC ====
IEC/RP MMC combines the advantages of RPLC and IEC. For example, WAX/RP has increased separation power and degree of freedom in adjusting the separation selectivity when compared with single WAX or RPLC.

==== HILIC/RPLC ====
Liu et al. synthesized a HILIC/RP stationary phase which could show RPLC or HILIC retention by adjusting the organic phase in mobile phase.

==== HILIC/IEC ====
Mant et al. reported that HILIC/CEX offered unique selectivity, stronger separation power and wider range of applications compared to RPLC for peptide separations.

==== SEC/IEC ====
Hydrophobic interactions in protein SEC are relatively weak at low ionic strength, electrostatic effects may contribute significantly to retention, and this allows us to use an SEC column as a weak ion exchanger.
