= Blended mode =

Mode of operation for plug-in hybrid electric vehicles

Blended mode is a charge-depleting mode of operation for plug-in hybrid electric vehicles (PHEVs) in which most of the motive energy is supplied by the battery pack but supplemented by the internal combustion engine (ICE). In contrast, all-electric or battery electric vehicles use only the electricity provided by the battery pack as their sole source of energy in a charge-depleting manner. Both types of advanced technology vehicles use regenerative brakes to recapture kinetic energy that should not be considered a fuel source but rather an efficiency aspect of these types of electric vehicle powertrains not found in traditional internal combustion engine vehicles.

An example of plug-in hybrids that operate in blended mode while charge-depleting is the Toyota Prius Plug-in Hybrid. Because the Prius plug-in operates as a series-parallel hybrid, the U.S. EPA estimated its EV range for blended operation on a combination of electricity (from a fully charged battery pack) and gasoline as 11 mi (18 km) until the battery is depleted.

Blended mode uses both gasoline or diesel and electricity as sources of energy, and as such reduces the amount of liquid fuel used while displacing it with electricity. In such a mode of operation the fuel economy is increased, but the amount of electricity consumed, normally measured in kWh, must also be considered. In the United States such combination is measured through miles per gallon of gasoline equivalent.

Since the electric energy stored on board is substantially less than that of a tank of gas, typically less than 1/4 gallon equivalent, the blended mode range might also be reported as the distance that the available battery capacity can sustain such a mode. Of course, driving conditions and speeds affect the mileage and range just as they do a traditional ICE vehicle's gas mileage. Hybrid vehicles have unlimited range so long as a supply of gas is available and they are able to operate as a gas only vehicle. Most blended mode hybrid vehicles also have some amount of all-electric range, and BEV's using pusher trailers or genset trailers can conversely give those vehicles unlimited range on gas as well as blended mode range.

Some early non-production plug-in hybrid electric vehicle conversions have been based on the version of Hybrid Synergy Drive (HSD) found in the 2004 and 2005 model year Toyota Prius. Early Pba conversions by CalCars have demonstrated 10 miles (16 km) of EV-only and 20 miles (32 km) of double mileage blended mode range. A company planning to offer conversions to consumers named EDrive systems will be using Valence Li-ion batteries and have 35 miles (56 km) of electric range. Both of these systems leave the existing HSD system mostly unchanged and might be applicable to other hybrid powertrain flavors by replacing the stock NiMH with a higher capacity battery pack and a charger to refill them for about $0.03 per mile from standard household outlets. Though the Honda Integrated Motor Assist (IMA) systems does not have low speed electric only abilities blended mode mileage could be greatly enhanced while displacing some of their gas consumption with electricity from external sources. The Advanced Hybrid System 2 (AHS2) could be offered with additional battery capacity and charging capabilities as an option, costing about $3000 if offered by the manufacturer. Though there are no plans to do so, this could prove an opportunity for General Motors and DaimlerChrysler's to overtake others who presently dominate the hybrid market by delivering a markedly more versatile and fuel efficient Hybrid.
