= Charge-depleting =

Mode of vehicle operation dependent on the energy from the battery pack

Charge-depleting or EV mode refers to an operation mode of an electric vehicle's powertrain that is chiefly dependent on the energy storage from the on-board battery pack. Battery electric vehicles operate solely in charge-depleting mode, and most plug-in hybrids operate in this mode at startup and switch to charge-sustaining mode after the battery has reached its minimum state of charge (SOC) threshold, exhausting the vehicle's all-electric range (AER). Although there is no technically mandated minimum all-electric range, future state and/or federal legislation may address this for policy purposes.

Another charge-depleting strategy is called blended mode, in which the engine supplements the battery during medium to heavy loads. Although this strategy does not include a purely all-electric mode, early NREL (National Renewable Energy Laboratory) simulations indicate that similar fuel savings as compared to conventional plug-in hybrid battery discharge and charge strategies. One advantage of a blended mode is that it may afford the vehicle designer the opportunity to use a smaller and less costly battery pack and traction motor.
