= Hybrid Synergy Drive =

Hybrid car drivetrain made by Toyota

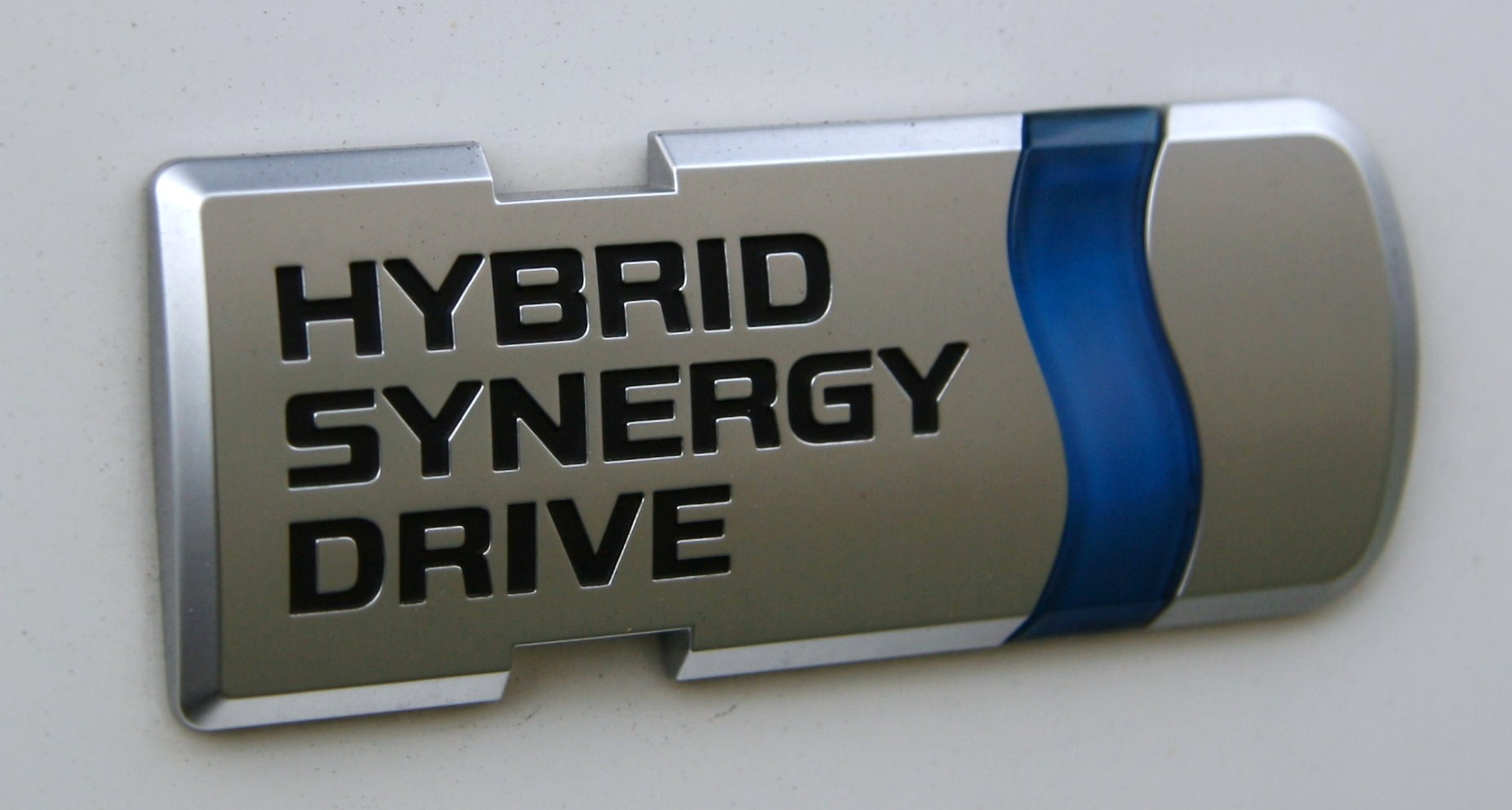
Hybrid Synergy Drive logo from a Toyota Prius

Hybrid Synergy Drive system (HSD), also known as Toyota Hybrid System II, is the brand name of Toyota Motor Corporation for the hybrid car drive train technology used in vehicles with the Toyota and Lexus marques. First introduced on the Prius, the technology is an option on several other Toyota and Lexus vehicles and has been adapted for the electric drive system of the hydrogen-powered Mirai, and for a plug-in hybrid version of the Prius. Previously, Toyota also licensed its HSD technology to Nissan for use in its Nissan Altima Hybrid. Its parts supplier Aisin offers similar hybrid transmissions to other car companies.

HSD technology produces a full hybrid vehicle which allows the car to run on the electric motor only, as opposed to most other brand hybrids which cannot and are considered mild hybrids. The HSD also combines an electric drive and a planetary gearset which performs similarly to a continuously variable transmission. The Synergy Drive is a drive-by-wire system with no direct mechanical connection between the engine and the engine controls: both the gas pedal/accelerator and the gearshift lever in an HSD car merely send electrical signals to a control computer.

Lexus Hybrid Drive logo

HSD is a refinement of the original Toyota Hybrid System (THS) used in the 1997 to 2003 Toyota Prius. The second generation system first appeared on the redesigned Prius in 2004. The name was changed in anticipation of its use in vehicles outside the Toyota brand. It was implemented in the 2006 Camry and Highlander, and would eventually be implemented in the 2010 "third generation" Prius, and the 2012 Prius c. (Lexus; the HSD-derived systems used in Lexus vehicles have been termed Lexus Hybrid Drive.) The Toyota Hybrid System is designed for increased power and efficiency, and also improved "scalability" (adaptability to larger as well as smaller vehicles), wherein the ICE/MG1 and the MG2 have separate reduction paths, and are combined in a "compound" gear which is connected to the final reduction gear train and differential; it was introduced on all-wheel drive and rear-wheel drive Lexus models. By May 2007 Toyota had sold one million hybrids worldwide; two million by the end of August 2009; and passed the 5 million mark in March 2013. As of September 2014, more than 7 million Lexus and Toyota hybrids had been sold worldwide. The United States accounted for 38% of TMC global hybrid sales as of March 2013.

== Principle ==
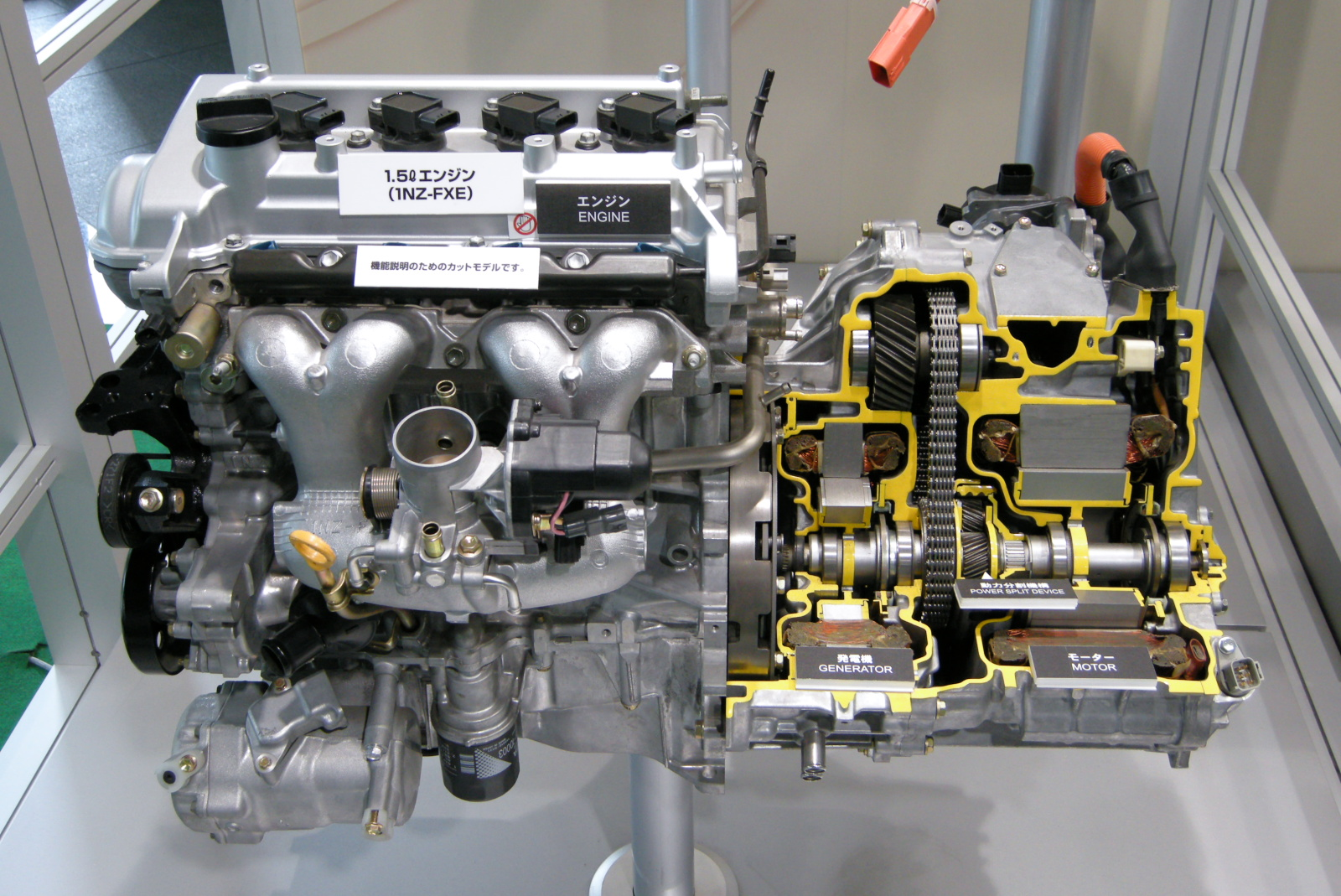
Toyota 1NZ-FXE engine (left) with early HSD, sectioned and highlighted (right). Generation 1/Generation 2, chained, ICE-MG1-MG2 Power Split Device HSD is shown.

Toyota's HSD system replaces a normal geared transmission with an electromechanical system. An internal combustion engine (ICE) delivers power most efficiently over a small speed range, but the wheels need to be driven over the vehicle's full speed range. In a conventional automobile the geared transmission delivers different discrete engine speed-torque power requirements to the wheels. Geared transmissions may be manual, with a clutch, or automatic, with a torque converter, but both allow the engine and the wheels to rotate at different speeds. The driver can adjust the speed and torque delivered by the engine with the accelerator and the transmission mechanically transmits nearly all of the available power to the wheels which rotate at a different rate than the engine, by a factor equal to the gear ratio for the currently selected gear. However, there are a limited number of "gears" or gear ratios that the driver can choose from, typically four to six. This limited gear-ratio set forces the engine crankshaft to rotate at speeds where the ICE is less efficient, i.e., where a liter of fuel produces fewer joules. Optimal engine speed-torque requirements for different vehicle driving and acceleration conditions can be gauged by limiting either tachometer RPM rate or engine noise in comparison with actual speed. When an engine is required to operate efficiently across a broad RPM range, due to its coupling to a geared transmission, manufacturers are limited in their options for improving engine efficiency, reliability, or lifespan, as well as reducing the size or weight of the engine. This is why the engine for an engine-generator is often much smaller, more efficient, more reliable, and longer life than one designed for an automobile or other variable speed application.

However, a continuously variable transmission allows the driver (or the automobile computer) to effectively select the optimal gear ratio required for any desired speed or power. The transmission is not limited to a fixed set of gears. This lack of constraint frees the engine to operate at its optimal brake-specific fuel consumption. An HSD vehicle will typically run the engine at its optimal efficiency whenever power is needed to charge batteries or accelerate the car, shutting down the engine entirely when less power is required.

Like a CVT, an HSD transmission continuously adjusts the effective gear ratio between the engine and the wheels to maintain the engine speed while the wheels increase their rotational speed during acceleration. This is why Toyota describes HSD-equipped vehicles as having an e-CVT (electronic continuously variable transmission) when required to classify the transmission type for standards specification lists or regulatory purposes.

=== Power flows ===
In a conventional car design the separately-excited alternator with integral rectifier (DC generator) and starter (DC motor) are considered accessories that are attached to the internal combustion engine (ICE) which normally drives a transmission to power the wheels propelling the vehicle. A battery is used only to start the car's internal combustion engine and run accessories when the engine is not running. The alternator is used to recharge the battery and run the accessories when the engine is running.

The HSD system replaces the geared transmission, alternator, and starter motor with:

- MG1, an AC motor–generator having a permanent magnet rotor, used as a motor when starting the ICE and as a generator (alternator) when charging the high-voltage battery
- MG2, an AC motor–generator, also having a permanent magnet rotor, used as the primary drive motor and as a generator (alternator) when regeneration power is directed to the high-voltage battery. MG2 is generally the more powerful of the two motor–generators
- Power electronics, including three DC–AC inverters and two DC–DC converters
- Computerized control system and sensors
- HVB, a high-voltage battery sources electrical energy during acceleration and sinks electrical energy during regeneration braking

Through the power splitter, a series-parallel full hybrid's HSD system thus allows for the following intelligent power flows:

- Auxiliary power
  - HVB → DC–DC converter → 12VDC battery
  - 12VDC battery → 12V vehicle electronics
- Engine charge (Recharging and/or heating catalytic converter and/or interior comfort HVAC)
  - ICE → MG1 → HVB
- Battery or EV drive
  - HVB → MG2 → wheels
- Engine & motor drive (Moderate acceleration)
  - ICE → wheels
  - ICE → MG1 → MG2 → wheels
- Engine drive with charge (Highway driving)
  - ICE → wheels
  - ICE → MG1 → HVB
- Engine and motor drive with charge (Heavy power situation such as in steep hills)
  - ICE → wheels
  - ICE → MG1 → HVB
  - ICE → MG1 → MG2 → wheels
- Full power or gradual slowing (Maximum power situations)
  - ICE → wheels
  - ICE → MG1 → MG2 → wheels
  - HVB → MG2 → wheels
- B-mode braking
  - Wheels → MG2 → HVB
  - Wheels → MG1 → ICE (ECU – Electronic Control Unit – uses MG1 to spin ICE which drains battery – allowing more charge from MG2, and also links ICE to wheels causing "engine braking"; ICE RPM increases when charge level of HVB is too much to accept regen electricity from MG2, or increasing effort from driver pushing the brake pedal)
- Regenerative braking
  - wheels → MG2 → HVB
- Hard braking
  - Front disk/rear drum (rear disk in UK) → wheels
  - All disk → wheels (2010 and newer, except 2012–present Prius c, which uses front disk, rear drum).

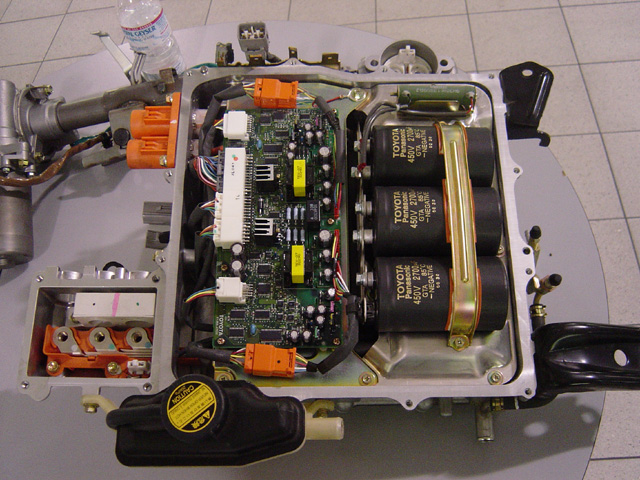
Power electronics from Prius NHW11 "Classic"

==== MG1 and MG2 ====
- MG1 (Primary motor–generator): A motor to start the ICE and a generator to generate electrical power for MG2 and to recharge the high-voltage traction battery, and, through a DC-to-DC converter, to recharge the 12 volt auxiliary battery. By regulating the amount of electrical power generated (by varying MG1's mechanical torque and speed), MG1 effectively controls the transaxle's continuously variable transmission.
- MG2 (Secondary motor–generator): Drives the wheels and regenerates power for the HV battery energy storage while braking the vehicle. MG2 drives the wheels with electrical power generated by the engine-driven MG1 and/or the HVB. During regenerative braking, MG2 acts as a generator, converting kinetic energy into electrical energy, storing this electrical energy in the battery.

=== Transmission ===
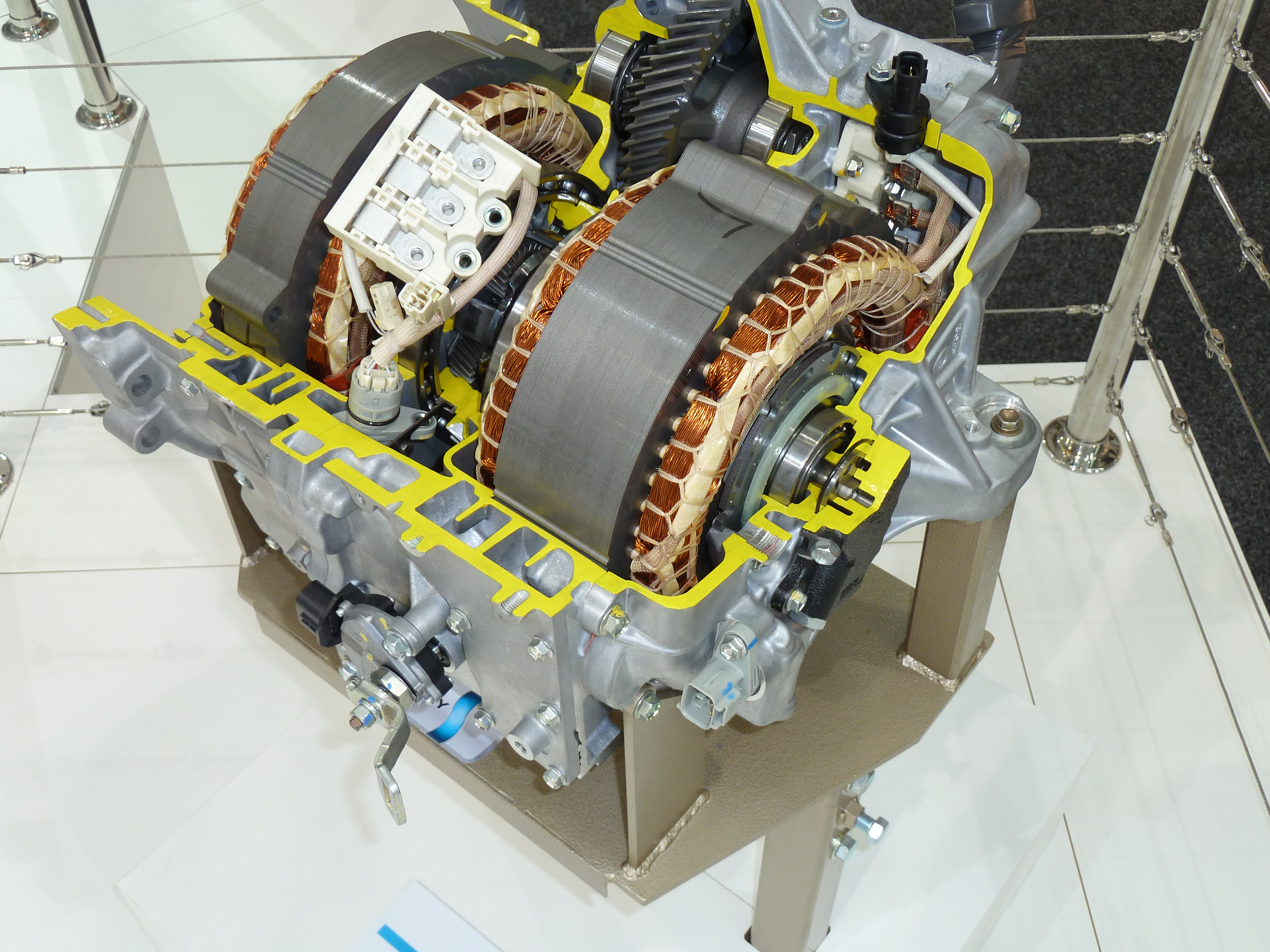
Late Toyota HSD, sectioned and highlighted. Generation 3, chainless, ICE-MG1 Power Split Device/MG2 Motor Speed Reduction Device HSD is shown. This is a P510 transaxle, from a 2012– Prius c; a P410 transaxle, from a 2010–2015 Prius, is similar, but is physically larger; a Generation 4 P610 transaxle from a 2016– Prius is 47mm narrower than a P410 by implementing side-by-side motors rather than end-to-end motors.

The mechanical gearing design of the system allows the mechanical power from the ICE to be split three ways: extra torque at the wheels (under constant rotation speed), extra rotation speed at the wheels (under constant torque), and power for an electric generator. A computer running appropriate programs controls the systems and directs the power flow from the different engine + motor sources. This power split achieves the benefits of a continuously variable transmission (CVT), except that the torque/speed conversion uses an electric motor rather than a direct mechanical gear train connection. An HSD car cannot operate without the computer, power electronics, battery pack, and motor–generators, though in principle it could operate while missing the internal combustion engine. (See: Plug-in hybrid) In practice, HSD equipped cars can be driven a mile or two without gasoline, as an emergency measure to reach a gas station.

An HSD transaxle contains a planetary gear set that adjusts and blends the amount of torque from the engine and motor(s) as it's needed by the front wheels. It is a sophisticated and complicated combination of gearing, electrical motor–generators, and computer-controlled electronic controls. One of the motor–generators, MG2, is connected to the output shaft, and thus couples torque into or out of the drive shafts; feeding electricity into MG2 adds torque at the wheels. The engine end of the drive shaft has a second differential; one leg of this differential is attached to the internal combustion engine and the other leg is attached to a second motor–generator, MG1. The differential relates the rotation speed of the wheels to the rotation speeds of the engine and MG1, with MG1 used to absorb the difference between wheel and engine speed. The differential is an epicyclic gear set (also called a "power split device"); that and the two motor–generators are all contained in a single transaxle housing that is bolted to the engine. Special couplings and sensors monitor rotation speed of each shaft and the total torque on the drive shafts, for feedback to the control computer.

In Generation 1 and Generation 2 HSDs, MG2 is directly connected to the ring gear, that is, a 1:1 ratio, and which offers no torque multiplication, whereas in Generation 3 HSDs, MG2 is connected to the ring gear through a 2.5:1 planetary gear set, and which, consequently, offers a 2.5:1 torque multiplication, this being a primary benefit of the Generation 3 HSD as it provides for a smaller, yet more powerful MG2. However, a secondary benefit is the MG1 will not be driven into overspeed as frequently, and which would otherwise mandate employing the ICE to mitigate this overspeed; this strategy improves HSD performance as well as saving fuel and wear-and-tear on the ICE.

=== High-voltage battery ===
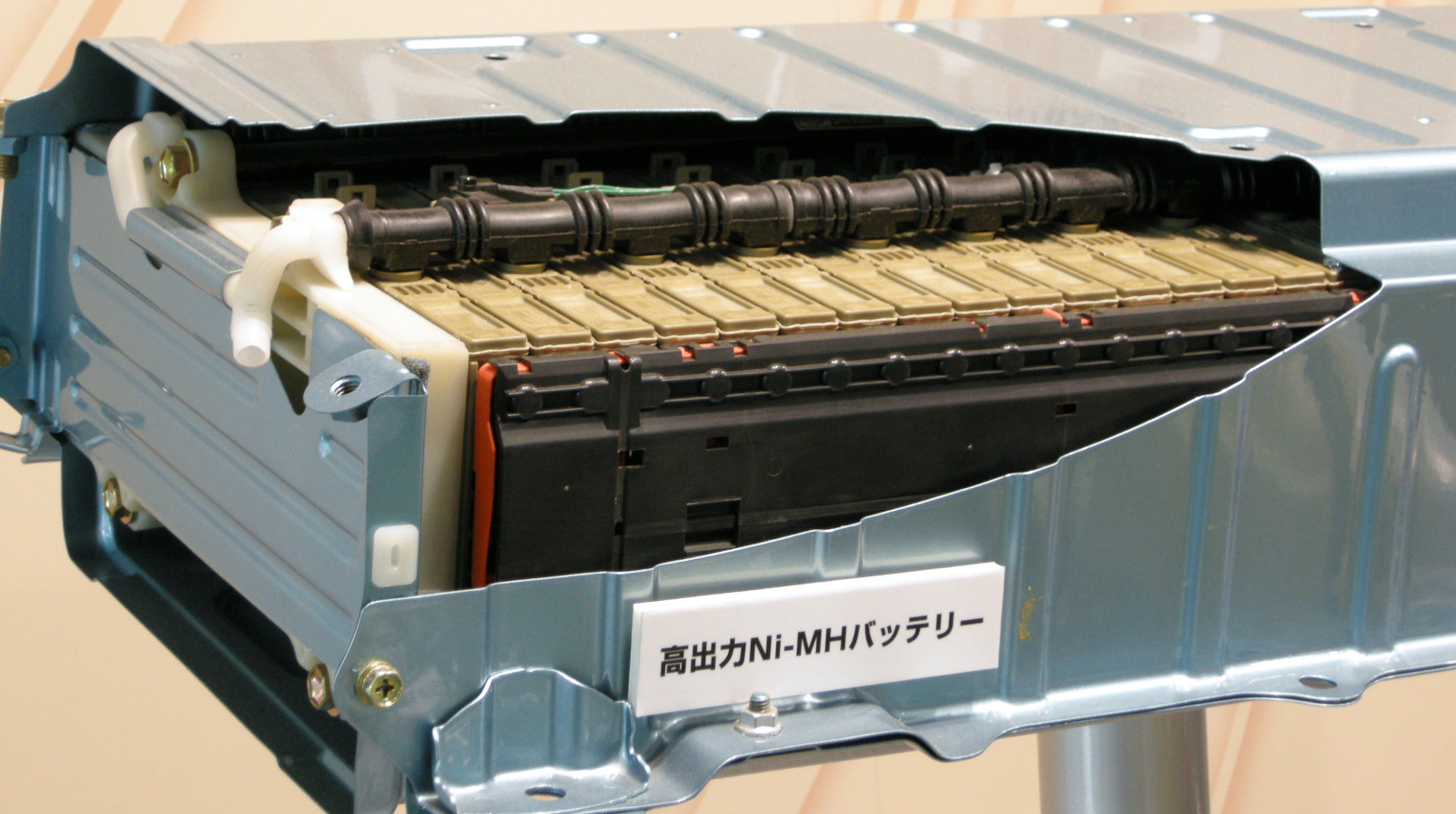
High-voltage nickel–metal hydride (NiMH) battery of second generation Toyota Prius

The HSD system has two principal battery packs, the high-voltage (HV) battery, also known as the traction battery, and a 12 volt lead–acid battery known as the low-voltage (LV) battery, which functions as an auxiliary battery. The LV battery supplies power to the electronics and accessories when the hybrid system is turned off and the high-voltage battery main relay is off.

The traction battery is a sealed nickel–metal hydride (NiMH) or lithium-ion battery pack. The battery pack of the first generation Toyota Prius consisted of 228 cells packaged in 38 modules, while the second generation Prius consisted of 28 Panasonic prismatic nickel metal hydride modules, each containing six 1.2 volt cells, connected in series to produce a nominal voltage of 201.6 volts. The discharge power capability of the second gen Prius pack is about 20 kW at 50% state of charge (SoC). The power capability increases with higher temperatures and decreases at lower temperatures. The Prius has a computer that's solely dedicated to keeping the battery at the optimum temperature and optimum charge level.

Like the second generation Prius, the third generation Prius battery pack is made up of the same type of 1.2 volt cells. It has 28 modules of 6 cells for a total nominal voltage of only 201.6 volts. A boost converter is used to produce 500 volt DC supply voltage for the inverters for MG1 and MG2. The car's electronics only allow 40% of total rated capacity of the battery pack (6.5 ampere-hour) to be used in order to prolong the battery life. As a result, the SoC is allowed to vary only between 40% and 80% of the rated full charge. The battery used in the Highlander Hybrid and the Lexus RX 400h was packaged in a different metal battery casing with 240 cells that deliver high voltage of 288 volts.

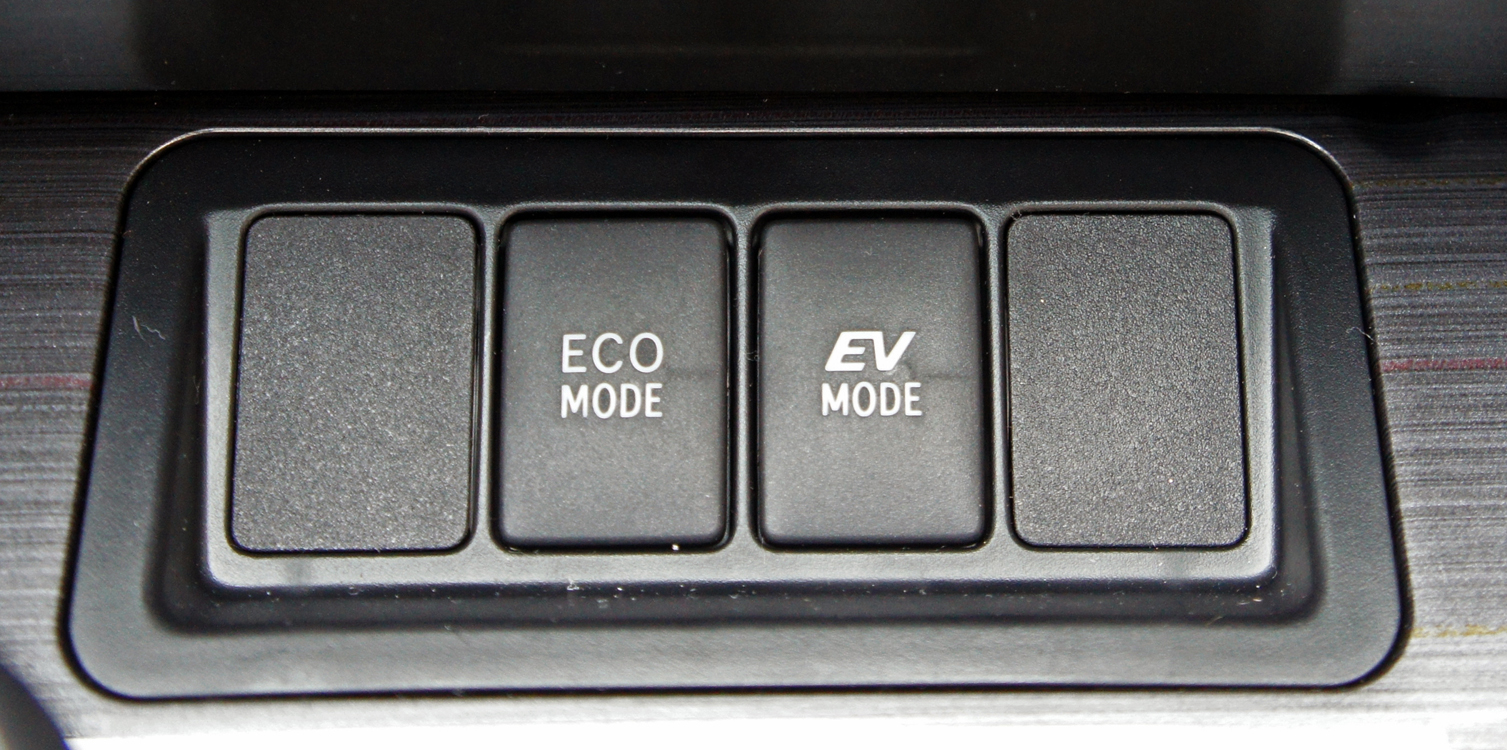
EV mode button in the 2012 Toyota Camry hybrid

A button labelled "EV" maintains electric vehicle mode after being powered on and under most low-load conditions at less than 25 mph (40 km/h) if the traction battery has enough charge. This permits all-electric driving with no fuel consumption for up to 1 mi (1.6 km). However, the HSD software switches to EV mode automatically whenever it can. Only the Toyota Prius Plug-in Hybrid has a longer driving all-electric range in blended operation electric-gasoline of 11 mi (18 km) (EPA rating) until the battery is depleted. The Prius PHEV is outfitted with 4.4 kWh lithium-ion batteries co-developed with Panasonic that weighs 80 kg (180 lb) compared with the nickel–metal hydride battery of the third generation Prius, which has a capacity of only 1.3 kWh, and weighs 42 kg (93 lb). The larger battery pack enables all-electric operation at higher speeds and longer distances than the conventional Prius hybrid.

The following table details the HV battery capacity for several Lexus and Toyota vehicles.

Vehicle	Model year	Battery capacity (kWh)	Battery type	Battery charge limit (kW)	Battery discharge limit (kW)
Lexus CT 200h	2011	1.3	NiMH		
Lexus ES 300h	2013	1.6	NiMH		
Lexus ES 300h	2021	1.6	Li-ion		
Lexus GS 450h	2013	1.9	NiMH		
Lexus IS 300h	2013	1.6	NiMH	-28,5	24
Lexus LC 500h	2018	1.1	Li-ion		
Lexus LS 600h L	2008	1.9	NiMH		
Lexus LS 500h	2018	1.1	Li-ion		
Lexus NX 300h	2015	1.6	NiMH	-27	25,5
Lexus NX 350h	2022	1.7	Li-ion		
Lexus NX 450h+	2022	18.1	Li-ion		
Lexus RX 450h	2014	1.9	NiMH		
Lexus RX 450h	2017	1.9	NiMH		
Lexus RX 350h	2023	1.68	NiMH		
Lexus RX 450h+	2023	18.1	NiMH		
Lexus UX 250h	2019	1.4	NiMH		
Toyota Avalon Hybrid	2013	1.6	NiMH		
Toyota Auris Hybrid	2014	1.3	NiMH	-25	21
Toyota Camry Hybrid	2014	1.6	NiMH	-27	25,5
Toyota Camry Hybrid	2018	1.6 / 1.0	NiMH / Li-ion		
Toyota Camry	2025	1.0	Li-ion		
Toyota C-HR Hybrid	2016	1.3	NiMH	-31,9	21
Toyota Corolla Hybrid	2019	1.4 / 0.75	NiMH / Li-ion	-31,9	21
Toyota Corolla Cross Hybrid	2023	0.9	Li-ion		
Toyota Crown	2023	1.15	NiMH		
Toyota Crown Signia	2025	1.15	NiMH		
Toyota Grand Highlander Hybrid	2024	1.3	NiMH		
Toyota Highlander Hybrid	2014	1.9	NiMH		
Toyota Highlander Hybrid	2020	1.9	NiMH		
Toyota Mirai (FCV)	2015	1.6	NiMH		
Toyota Prius	2010	1.3	NiMH	-25	21
Toyota Prius	2016	1.2 / 0.75	NiMH / Li-ion	-31,9	21
Toyota Prius	2023	1.3 / 1.31	NiMH / Li-ion		
Toyota Prius c	2014	0.9	NiMH		
Toyota Prius v	2014	1.3 / 1.0	NiMH / Li-ion		
Toyota Prius PHV	2014	4.4	Li-ion		
Toyota Prius Prime	2016	8.8	Li-ion	-40	65
Toyota Prius Prime	2024	8.8 / 13.59	Li-ion		
Toyota RAV4 Hybrid	2015	1.6	NiMH	-27	25,5
Toyota RAV4 Hybrid	2019	1.6	NiMH (2020– Li-ion)	-38	24
Toyota RAV4	2026	0.93 / 1.59	NiMH / Li-ion		
Toyota RAV4 Prime	2020	18.1	Li-ion		
Toyota RAV4 PHV	2026	22.7	Li-ion		
Toyota Sienna	2021	1.9	NiMH		
Toyota Yaris Hybrid	2014	0.9	NiMH	-17,5	15
Toyota Yaris Hybrid	2020	0.76	Li-ion	-35	20
Toyota Innova/Kijang Innova Zenix Hybrid	2022	1.31	NiMH		

== Operation ==
The HSD drive works by shunting electrical power between the two motor generators, running off the battery pack, to even out the load on the internal combustion engine. Since a power boost from the electrical motors is available for periods of rapid acceleration, the ICE can be downsized to match only the average load on the car, rather than sized by peak power demands for rapid acceleration. The smaller internal combustion engine can be designed to run more efficiently. Furthermore, during normal operation the engine can be operated at or near its ideal speed and torque level for power, economy, or emissions, with the battery pack absorbing or supplying power as appropriate to balance the demand placed by the driver. During traffic stops the internal combustion engine can even be turned off for even more economy.

The combination of efficient car design, regenerative braking, turning the engine off for traffic stops, significant electrical energy storage and efficient internal combustion engine design give the HSD powered car significant efficiency advantages—particularly in city driving.

=== Phases of operation ===
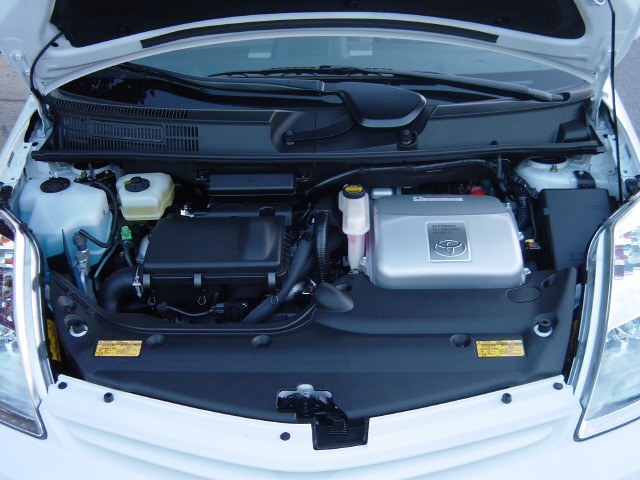
A typical Hybrid Synergy Drive configuration

The HSD operates in distinct phases depending on speed and demanded torque. Here are a few of them:

- Battery charging: The HSD can charge its battery without moving the car, by running the engine and extracting electrical power from MG1. The power gets shunted into the battery, and no torque is supplied to the wheels. The onboard computer does this when required, for example when stopped in traffic or to warm up the engine and catalytic converter after a cold start.
- Engine start: To start the engine, power is applied to MG1 to act as a starter. Because of the size of the motor generators, starting the engine is relatively fast and requires relatively little power from MG1. Additionally, the conventional starter motor sound is not heard. Engine start can occur while stopped or moving.
- Reverse gear (equivalent): There is no reverse gear as in a conventional gearbox: the computer reverses the phase sequence to AC motor–generator MG2, applying negative torque to the wheels. Early models did not supply enough torque for some situations: there have been reports of early Prius owners not being able to back the car up steep hills in San Francisco. The problem has been fixed in recent models. If the battery is low, the system can simultaneously run the engine and draw power from MG1, although this will reduce available reverse torque at the wheels.
- Neutral gear (equivalent): Most jurisdictions require automotive transmissions to have a neutral gear that decouples the engine and transmission. The HSD "neutral gear" is achieved by turning the electric motors off. Under this condition, the planetary gear is stationary (if the vehicle wheels are not turning); if the vehicle wheels are turning, the ring gear will rotate, causing the sun gear to rotate as well (the engine inertia will keep the carrier gear stationary unless the speed is high), while MG1 is free to rotate while the batteries do not charge. The owners manual warns that Neutral gear will eventually drain the battery, resulting in "unnecessary" engine power to recharge batteries; a discharged battery will render the vehicle inoperable.

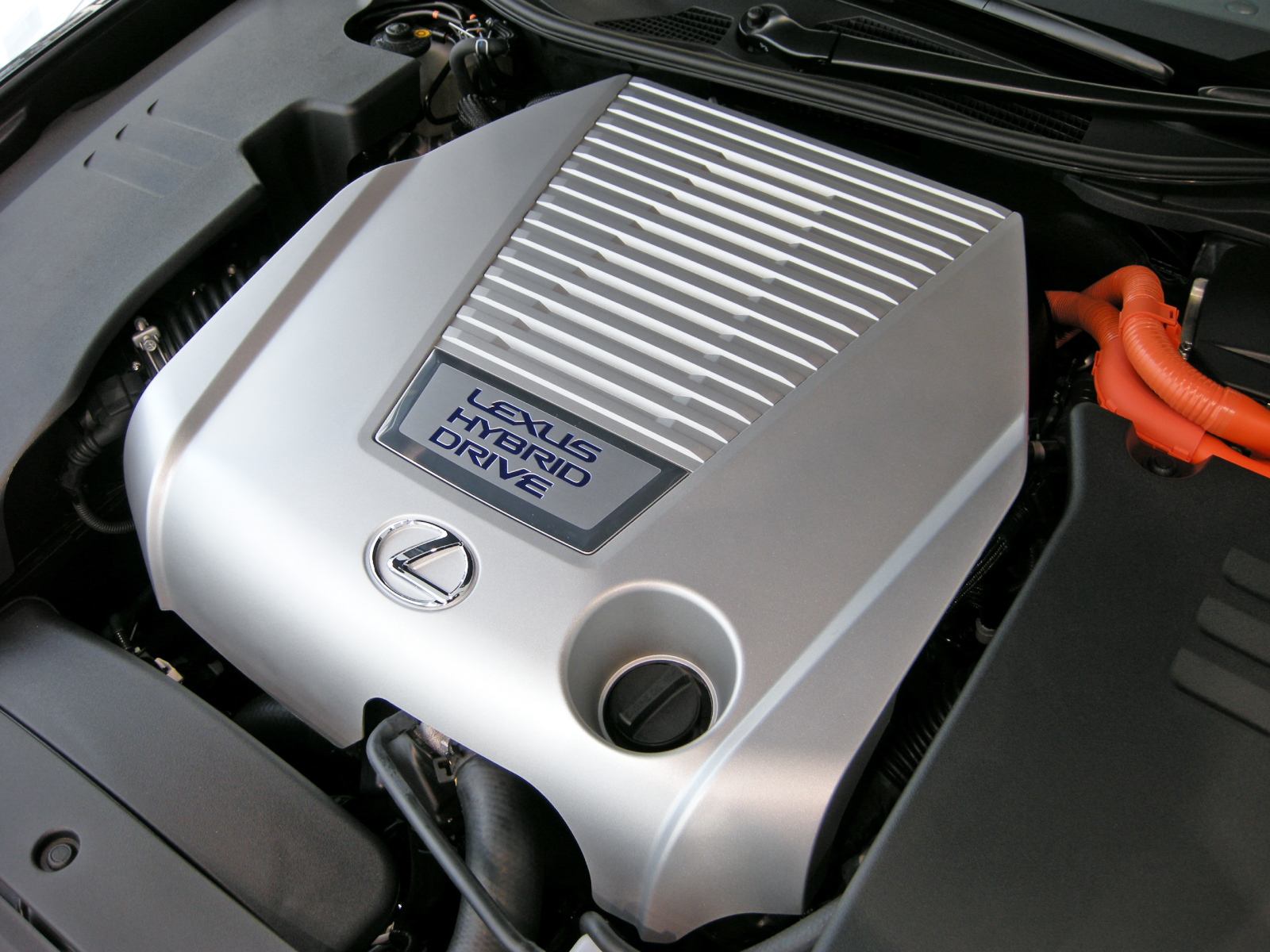
Lexus Hybrid Drive

- EV operation: At slow speeds and moderate torques the HSD can operate without running the internal combustion engine at all: electricity is supplied only to MG2, allowing MG1 to rotate freely (and thus decoupling the engine from the wheels). This is popularly known as "Stealth Mode". Provided that there is enough battery power, the car can be driven in this silent mode for some miles even without gasoline.
- Low gear (equivalent): When accelerating at low speeds in normal operation, the engine turns more rapidly than the wheels but does not develop sufficient torque. The extra engine speed is fed to MG1 acting as a generator. The output of MG1 is fed to MG2, acting as a motor and adding torque at the driveshaft.
- High gear (equivalent): When cruising at high speed, the engine turns more slowly than the wheels but develops more torque than needed. MG2 then runs as a generator to remove the excess engine torque, producing power that is fed to MG1 acting as a motor to increase the wheel speed. In steady state, the engine provides all of the power to propel the car unless the engine is unable to supply it (as during heavy acceleration, or driving up a steep incline at high speed). In this case, the battery supplies the difference. Whenever the required propulsion power changes, the battery quickly balances the power budget, allowing the engine to change power relatively slowly.
- Regenerative braking: By drawing power from MG2 and depositing it into the battery pack, the HSD can simulate the deceleration of normal engine braking while saving the power for future boost. The regenerative brakes in an HSD system absorb a significant amount of the normal braking load, so the conventional brakes on HSD vehicles are undersized compared to brakes on a conventional car of similar mass and last significantly longer.
- Engine braking: The HSD system has a special transmission setting labelled 'B' (for Brake), that takes the place of a conventional automatic transmission's 'L' setting, providing engine braking on hills. This can be manually selected in place of regenerative braking. During braking, when the battery is approaching potentially damaging high charge levels, the electronic control system automatically switches to conventional engine braking, drawing power from MG2 and shunting it to MG1, speeding the engine with throttle closed to absorb energy and decelerate the vehicle.
- Electric boost: The battery pack provides a reservoir of energy that allows the computer to match the demand on the engine to a predetermined optimal load curve, rather than operating at the torque and speed demanded by the driver and road. The computer manages the energy level stored in the battery, so as to have capacity to absorb extra energy where needed or supply extra energy to boost engine power.

=== Performance ===
The Toyota Prius has modest acceleration but has extremely high efficiency for a midsized four-door sedan: usually significantly better than 40 mpg (US) (5.9 L/100 km) is typical of brief city jaunts; 55 mpg (4.3 L/100 km) is not uncommon, especially for extended drives at modest speeds (a longer drive allows the engine to warm up fully). This is approximately twice the fuel efficiency of a similarly equipped four-door sedan with a conventional power train. Not all of the extra efficiency of the Prius is due to the HSD system: the Atkinson cycle engine itself was also designed specifically to minimize engine drag via an offset crankshaft to minimize piston drag during the power stroke, and a unique intake system to prevent drag caused by manifold vacuum ("pumping losses") versus the normal Otto cycle in most engines. Furthermore, the Atkinson cycle recovers more energy per cycle than the Otto because of its longer power stroke. The downside of the Atkinson cycle is much reduced torque, particularly at low speed; but the HSD has enormous low-speed torque available from MG2.

The Highlander Hybrid (also sold as the Kluger in some countries) offers better acceleration performance compared to its non-hybrid version. The hybrid version goes from 0–60 mph in 7.2 seconds, trimming almost a second off the conventional version's time. Net power is 268 hp (200 kW) compared to the conventional 215 hp (160 kW). Top speed for all Highlanders is limited to 112 mph (180 km/h). Typical fuel economy for the Highlander Hybrid rates between 27 and 31 mpg (8.7–7.6 L/100 km). A conventional Highlander is rated by the EPA with 19 city, 25 highway mpg (12.4 and 9.4 L/100 km respectively).

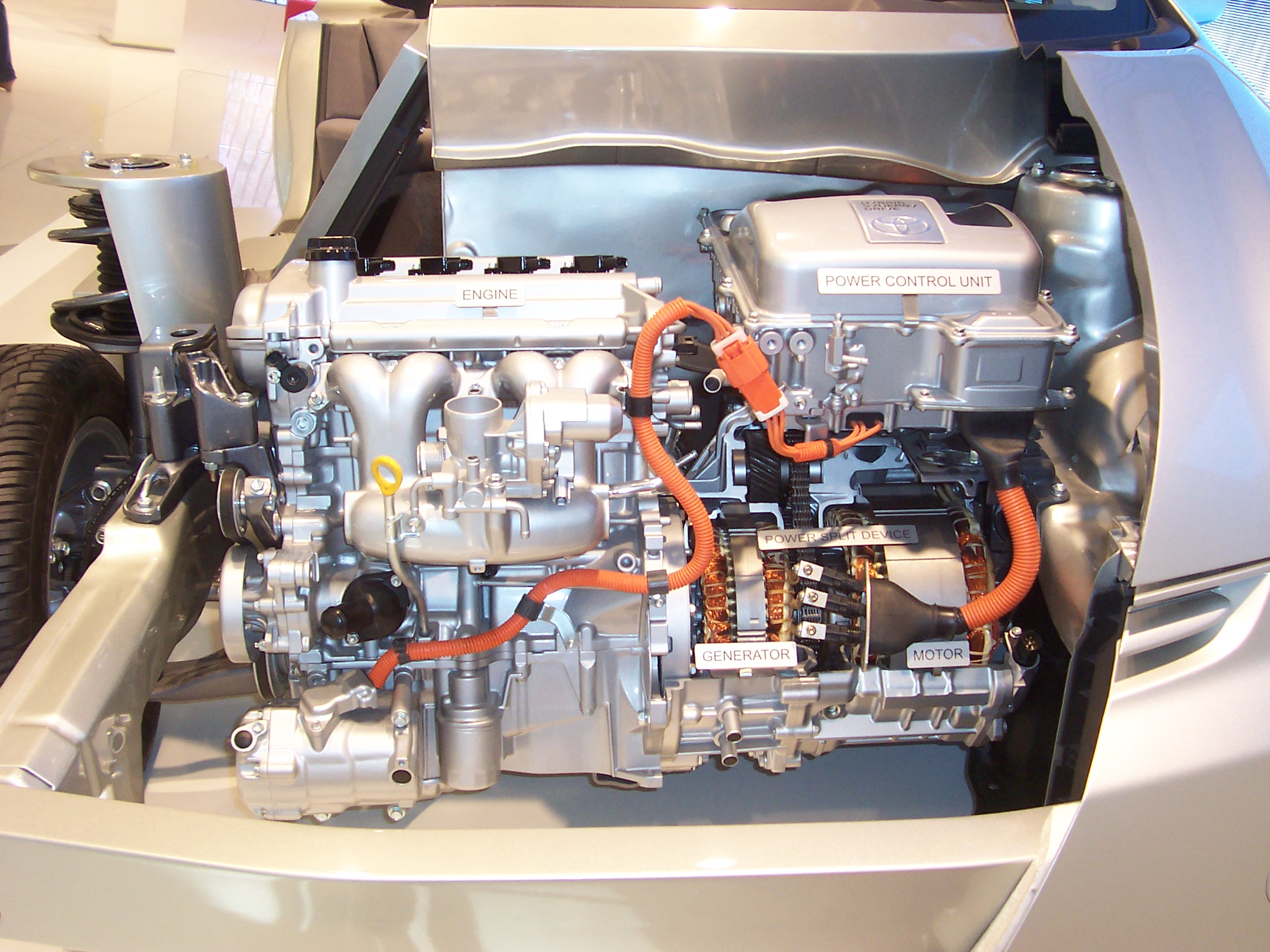
Cutaway display of the HSD Note: Generation 1/Generation 2, chained, ICE-MG1-MG2 Power Split Device HSD is shown

The HSD mileage boost depends on using the gasoline engine as efficiently as possible, which requires:

- extended drives, especially in winter: Heating the internal cabin for the passengers runs counter to the design of the HSD. The HSD is designed to generate as little waste heat as possible. In a conventional car, this waste heat in winter is usually used to heat the internal cabin. In the Prius, running the heater requires the engine to continue running to generate cabin-usable heat. This effect is most noticeable when turning the climate control (heater) off when the car is stopped with the engine running. Normally the HSD control system will shut the engine off as it is not needed, and will not start it again until the generator reaches a maximum speed.
- moderate acceleration: Because hybrid cars can throttle back or completely shut off the engine during moderate, but not rapid, acceleration, they are more sensitive than conventional cars to driving style. Hard acceleration forces the engine into a high-power state while moderate acceleration keeps the engine in a lower power, high efficiency state (augmented by battery boost).
- gradual braking: Regenerative brakes re-use the energy of braking, but cannot absorb energy as fast as conventional brakes. Gradual braking recovers energy for re-use, boosting mileage; hard braking wastes the energy as heat, just as for a conventional car. Use of the "B" (braking) selector on the transmission control is useful on long downhill runs to reduce heat and wear on the conventional brakes, but it does not recover additional energy. Constant use of "B" is discouraged by Toyota as it "may cause decreased fuel economy" compared to driving in "D".

Most HSD systems have batteries that are sized for maximal boost during a single acceleration from zero to the top speed of the vehicle; if there is more demand, the battery can be completely exhausted, so that this extra torque boost is not available. Then the system reverts to just the power available from the engine. This results in a large decline in performance under certain conditions: an early-model Prius can achieve over 90 mph (140 km/h) on a 6 degree upward slope, but after about 2,000 feet (610 m) of altitude climb the battery is exhausted and the car can achieve only 55–60 mph on the same slope. (until the battery is recharged by driving under less demanding circumstances)

== Prius Platform Generations ==
The design of the Toyota Hybrid System / Hybrid Synergy Drive has now had five generations since the original 1997 Japanese-market Toyota Prius. The power train has the same basic features, but there have been a number of significant refinements.

Toyota Hybrid System transmissions
Model	Gen.	Traction motor (MG2)			Engine			Applications
Model	Gen.	Model	Power	Torque	Model	Power	Torque	Applications
Front-wheel drive (transaxle)
P110	G1	1CM	30 kW (40 hp)	305 N⋅m (225 lbf⋅ft)	1NZ-FXE	43 kW (58 hp)	102 N⋅m (75 lbf⋅ft)	Prius NHW10 (1997–2000)
P111	G1	2CM	33 kW (44 hp)	350 N⋅m (260 lbf⋅ft)	1NZ-FXE	53 kW (71 hp)	115 N⋅m (85 lbf⋅ft)	Prius NHW11 (2000–2003)
P112	G2	3CM	50 kW (67 hp)	400 N⋅m (300 lbf⋅ft)	1NZ-FXE	56 kW (75 hp)	110 N⋅m (81 lbf⋅ft)	Prius NHW20 (2003–2009)
P210	G1 (SM)	1EM (Note: Single-motor variant omits MG2 and uses MG1 only)	13 kW (17 hp)	110 N⋅m (81 lbf⋅ft)	2AZ-FXE	96 kW (129 hp)	190 N⋅m (140 lbf⋅ft)	Alphard ATH10W (2003–2008); Estima AHR10W (2001–2006)
P310	G3	1JM	123 kW (165 hp)	333 N⋅m (246 lbf⋅ft)	3MZ-FE	155 kW (208 hp)	288 N⋅m (212 lbf⋅ft)	Harrier / RX400h MHU38 (2005–2009); Highlander / Kluger MHU28W, MHU48 (2005–2013)
P311	G3	2JM	105 kW (141 hp)	270 N⋅m (200 lbf⋅ft)	2AZ-FXE	110 kW (150 hp)	190 N⋅m (140 lbf⋅ft)	Alphard/Vellfire ATH20W (2008–2015); Camry AHV40 (2006–2011); Estima AHR20W (2006–2019); Sai AZK10 / HS250h ANF10 (2009–2018)
P313	G3	4JM	123 kW (165 hp)	335 N⋅m (247 lbf⋅ft)	2GR-FXE	172–183 kW (231–245 hp)	317 N⋅m (234 lbf⋅ft)	Highlander GVU48 (2011–2019); RX 450h GLV10 (2009–2015)
P313	G3	6JM	123 kW (165 hp)	335 N⋅m (247 lbf⋅ft)	2GR-FXS	193 kW (259 hp)	335 N⋅m (247 lbf⋅ft)	RX 450h GLV20 (2015–2022)
P314	G3	2JM	105 kW (141 hp)	270 N⋅m (200 lbf⋅ft)	2AR-FXE	112 kW (150 hp)	206 N⋅m (152 lbf⋅ft)	Alphard/Vellfire AYH30W (2015–2023); Avalon AVX40 (2013–2018); Camry / Daihatsu Altis AVV50 (2011–2017); ES 300h AVV60 (2012–2018); Harrier AVU65 (2013–2020); NX 300h AZ10 (2014–2021); RAV4 AVA44 (2012–2018)
P410	G3	3JM	60 kW (80 hp)	207 N⋅m (153 lbf⋅ft)	2ZR-FXE	73 kW (98 hp)	142 N⋅m (105 lbf⋅ft)	Auris ZWE150, ZWE186H (2010–2018); Prius ZVW30, ZVW35 (2009–2015); CT 200h ZWA10 (2010–2022)
P410	G3	5JM	60 kW (80 hp)	207 N⋅m (153 lbf⋅ft)	2ZR-FXE	73 kW (98 hp)	142 N⋅m (105 lbf⋅ft)	Noah / Voxy / Esquire ZWR80 (2014–2021); Prius+ / α/ V ZVW40W / Daihatsu Mebius (2011–2021)
P510	G3	1LM/ 2LM	45 kW (60 hp)	169 N⋅m (125 lbf⋅ft)	1NZ-FXE / -FXP	54 kW (72 hp)	111 N⋅m (82 lbf⋅ft)	Aqua NHP10 / Prius c NHP10 (2011–2021); Corolla Axio/ Fielder NKE165 (2012–2025); JPN Taxi NTP10 (2017–present); Probox / Succeed / Mazda Familia Van NHP160 (2014–present); Sienta NHP170 (2015–2022); Vitz / Yaris NHP130 (2012–2020)
P610	G4	1NM	53 kW (71 hp)	163 N⋅m (120 lbf⋅ft)	2ZR-FXE	72 kW (97 hp)	142 N⋅m (105 lbf⋅ft)	C-HR ZYX10 (2016–2023); Corolla / Corolla Sport / Corolla Touring ZWE210 (2018–present); Corolla Cross ZVG10 (2020–present); Levin ZWE180, ZWE210 (2015–present); Prius ZVW50 (2015–2022)
P610	G4	1NM + 1SM (Note: Transmission equipped with a one-way clutch to permit dual-motor operation with MG1 and MG2)	+23 kW (31 hp)	+40 N⋅m (30 lbf⋅ft)	2ZR-FXE	72 kW (97 hp)	142 N⋅m (105 lbf⋅ft)	Prius PHV/Prime ZVW55 (2016–2022)
P710	G4	3NM	88 kW (118 hp)	202 N⋅m (149 lbf⋅ft)	A25A-FXS	131 kW (176 hp)	221 N⋅m (163 lbf⋅ft)	Avalon AXXH50 (2018–present); Camry / Daihatsu Altis AXVH70N (2017–2024); Crown AZSH35 (2018–2022); Harrier AXUH80 (2020–present); RAV4 / Wildlander AXAH50 (2018–2025); RAV4 / Wildlander AXAH60 (2025–present); Venza AXUH85 (2020–2026); ES 300h AXZH10 (2018–2025); ES 300h AXZH20 (2025–present)
P711	G4	3NM	88 kW (118 hp)	202 N⋅m (149 lbf⋅ft)	M20A-FXS	107 kW (143 hp)	188 N⋅m (139 lbf⋅ft)	C-HR MAXH10 (2016–2023); Corolla MZEH12 (2018–present); UX 250h MZAH10 (2018–2024)
P810	G4	5NM	134 kW (180 hp)	270 N⋅m (200 lbf⋅ft)	A25A-FXS	130–140 kW (170–190 hp)	221–243 N⋅m (163–179 lbf⋅ft)	Alphard / Vellfire AAHH40 (2023–present); Crown Kluger / Highlander / Kluger AXUH70 (2019–present); Grand Highlander AASH10 (2023–present); Harrier PHEV AXUP85 (2022–present); RAV4 PHV/Prime / Wildlander AXAP54 / Suzuki Across (2020–2025); RAV4 PHV / Wildlander AXAP64 / Suzuki Across (2025–present); Sienna / Granvia AXHL40 (2020–present); LM 350h AAWH10 (2023–present); NX 450h+ / 350h AAZH20, AALH16 (2021–present)
P810-I	G4	5NM	134 kW (180 hp)	270 N⋅m (200 lbf⋅ft)	2GR-FXS	193 kW (259 hp)	335 N⋅m (247 lbf⋅ft)	Century SUV GRG75 (2023–present); TX 550h+ GYU15 (2023–present)
P910	G4	1NM	59 kW (79 hp)	141 N⋅m (104 lbf⋅ft)	M15A-FXE	67 kW (90 hp)	120 N⋅m (89 lbf⋅ft)	Aqua MXPK10 (2021–present); Sienta MXPL10 (2022–present); Urban Cruiser Hyryder / Maruti Suzuki Grand Vitara (2022–present); Yaris MXPH10 / Mazda2 Hybrid (2020–present); Yaris Cross MXPJ10 (2020–present)
PA10	G5	1VM	70 kW (94 hp)	185 N⋅m (136 lbf⋅ft)	2ZR-FXE	72 kW (97 hp)	142 N⋅m (105 lbf⋅ft)	C-HR ZYX20 (2023–present); Corolla / Corolla Sport / Corolla Touring / Levin ZWE210, Suzuki Swace (2023–present); Corolla Cross ZVG10 (2023–present); Noah / Voxy ZWR90, Suzuki Landy (2023–present); Prius ZVW60 (2023–present)
PB10	G5	1VM	83 kW (111 hp)	206 N⋅m (152 lbf⋅ft)	M20A-FXS	112 kW (150 hp)	188 N⋅m (139 lbf⋅ft)	C-HR MAXH20 (2023–present); Corolla / Corolla Touring / Levin GT MZEH10, Suzuki Swace (2023–present); Corolla Cross / Frontlander MXGH10 (2023–present); Innova MAGH10, Suzuki Invicto (2022–present); Prius MXWH60 (2023–present); UX 300h MZAH10 (2023–present)
PB11	G5	1VM	100 kW (130 hp)	208 N⋅m (153 lbf⋅ft)	A25A-FXS	137 kW (184 hp)	221 N⋅m (163 lbf⋅ft)	Camry HEV AXVH80 (2023–present)
PB12	G5	1VM	120 kW (160 hp)	208 N⋅m (153 lbf⋅ft)	M20A-FXS	111 kW (149 hp)	188 N⋅m (139 lbf⋅ft)	C-HR PHEV MAXH21 (2023–present); Prius PHEV/Prime MXWH61 (2023–present)
Rear-wheel drive
L110 / L110F	G3 (RWD)	1 km	147–165 kW (197–221 hp)	275–300 N⋅m (203–221 lbf⋅ft)	2UR-FSE	280–290 kW (380–390 hp)	510–520 N⋅m (380–380 lbf⋅ft)	Century UWG60 (2018–present); LS 600h UVF46 (2006–2017)
L110 / L110F	G3 (RWD)	1 km	147–165 kW (197–221 hp)	275–300 N⋅m (203–221 lbf⋅ft)	2GR-FSE	217 kW (291 hp)	368 N⋅m (271 lbf⋅ft)	GS 450h GWS191 (2005–2011)
L110 / L110F	G3 (RWD)	1 km	147–165 kW (197–221 hp)	275–300 N⋅m (203–221 lbf⋅ft)	2GR-FXE	217 kW (291 hp)	356 N⋅m (263 lbf⋅ft)	Crown GWS204 (2008–2012)
L210 / L210F	G3 (RWD)	1 km	105 kW (141 hp)	300 N⋅m (220 lbf⋅ft)	A25A-FXS	135 kW (181 hp)	221 N⋅m (163 lbf⋅ft)	Crown AZSH20 (2018–2022)
L210 / L210F	G3 (RWD)	1 km	105 kW (141 hp)	300 N⋅m (220 lbf⋅ft)	2AR-FSE	131 kW (176 hp)	221 N⋅m (163 lbf⋅ft)	Crown AWS210 (2012–2018); IS 300h AVE30 (2013–present); RC 300h AVC10 (2014–2025)
L210 / L210F	G3 (RWD)	1 km	105 kW (141 hp)	300 N⋅m (220 lbf⋅ft)	2GR-FXE	217 kW (291 hp)	356 N⋅m (263 lbf⋅ft)	GS 300h AWL10 (2014–2020)
L310 / L310F	G4 (RWD)	2NM	132 kW (177 hp)	300 N⋅m (220 lbf⋅ft)	8GR-FXS	220 kW (300 hp)	356 N⋅m (263 lbf⋅ft)	Crown GWS224 (2018–2022); LC 500h GWZ100 (2017–present); LS 500h GVF50 (2017–present)

=== Generation 1 (Toyota Hybrid System) ===
Schematic diagram of the First- and Second-Generation Toyota Hybrid System transaxle (P110/ P111/ P112): S: Central "'sun" gear; P: Planetary gear carrier; R: Outer ring gear; 1: Motor–Generator 1; 2: Motor–Generator 2; E: Internal Combustion Engine

The system was called the Toyota Hybrid System (THS) when it was introduced with the Prius in 1997. The hybrid transaxle, designated P110, includes two electric motors (MG1 and MG2) and a planetary gearset, which Toyota calls the "Power Split Device" (PSD); mechanical power from the internal combustion engine (E) can be directed either to the wheels or to MG1, acting as a generator.

Electrical power flows between MG1, MG2, and a storage battery through an inverter. Although MG1 typically operates as a generator (alternator), it also serves as the starter motor for the internal combustion engine. MG2 usually acts as a motor, either by itself at low speeds or to assist the internal combustion engine, but MG2 also can act as a generator, for instance, during deceleration for regenerative braking.

Schematically, MG1 is connected to the central sun gear (S), the internal combustion engine is connected to the planetary gear carrier (P) and not to any individual gear, and MG2 is connected to the ring gear (R). The wheels are connected to the ring gear through appropriate reduction gearing and a differential, not illustrated in the diagram.

The Toyota Hybrid System uses a high-voltage battery pack, ranging between 276 and 288 V. There has been a continuous, gradual improvement in the specific capacity of the traction battery. The original Prius used shrink-wrapped 1.2 volt D cells, and all subsequent THS/HSD vehicles have used custom 7.2 V battery modules mounted in a carrier.

==== G1 single-motor ====
Schematic diagram of single-motor THS transaxle (P210) with v-belt CVT

In 2001, a modified version of the Generation 1 THS transaxle was released in the Japanese domestic market as the P210 transaxle, fitted to the Estima minivan. The P210 couples the internal combustion engine (E) with the sun gear (S) and couples the starter/generator (MG1) with the planetary gear carrier (P), which is the opposite of the G1 THS scheme. In addition, the single-motor G1 THS omits the traction motor (MG2) and uses a belt-drive continuously variable transmission which can be selectively coupled via rotating clutches to either the planetary gear carrier (P) or the ring gear (R).

An all-wheel drive option for the Estima was released at the same time; the Q410 rear drive unit uses an electric traction motor with no mechanical coupling to the front transaxle.

=== Generation 2 (Toyota Hybrid System-II) ===
THS was followed by THS-II in the 2004 Prius. Starting with THS-II, Toyota also began referring to the system as Hybrid Synergy Drive (HSD). Compared to THS, THS-II offered reduced consumption and better performance with increased power and torque. THS-II uses the same design as THS, combining traction power from an internal combustion engine and an electric motor via a planetary gearset (power split device) which can divert some power to an electrical generator.

Electrically, HSD/THS-II adds a DC to DC converter boosting the potential of the battery to 500 V or more. This allows smaller battery packs to be used, and more powerful motors. Compared to THS, the physical size of the traction motor (MG2) in THS-II remains approximately the same, but the maximum output has increased from 33 to 50 kW (44 to 67 hp) and the maximum torque has increased from 350 to 400 N⋅m (260 to 300 lbf⋅ft). The stator windings are connected in series, which requires a higher potential.

Although not part of the THS/HSD as such, starting with the 2004 Prius, all THS/HSD vehicles have been fitted with an electric air-conditioning compressor, instead of the conventional engine-driven type. This removes the need to continuously run the engine when cabin cooling is required. Two positive temperature coefficient heaters are fitted in the heater core to supplement the heat provided by the engine.

=== Generation 3 (Hybrid Synergy Drive) ===
Schematic diagram of the Third-Generation Hybrid Synergy Drive transaxle (P31x/ P410/ P510); a second planetary gearset has been added

The updated version of HSD first delivered in the model year 2006 RX 400h is similar to THS/THS-II, with the addition of a second planetary gearset, which Toyota calls the Motor Speed Reduction Device (MSRD); it is compounded with the first planetary gearset (PSD) by coupling the two ring gears (R1 and R2) together. The coupled ring gears are still used to drive the front wheels of the vehicle. The traction motor (MG2) uses the MSRD as a reduction gear, making it possible to increase the power density of the motor. Ford has also developed a similar hybrid system, introduced in the Ford Escape Hybrid.

Toyota CEO Katsuaki Watanabe said in a 16 February 2007 interview that Toyota was "aiming at reducing, by half, both the size and cost of the third-generation HSD system". The new system will feature lithium-ion batteries in later years. Lithium-ion batteries have a higher energy capacity-to-weight ratio compared to NiMH, but operate at higher temperatures, and are subject to thermal instability if not properly manufactured and controlled, raising safety concerns.

==== G3 all-wheel drive with hybrid transaxle ====
In 2005, vehicles such as the Lexus RX 400h and Toyota Highlander Hybrid added four-wheel drive operation by adding a third electric motor ("MGR") on the rear axle. In this system, the rear axle is purely electrically powered, and there is no mechanical link between the engine and the rear wheels. This also permits regenerative braking on the rear wheels.

==== G3 rear-wheel drive (Lexus Hybrid Drive) ====
Schematic diagram of rear-wheel Lexus Hybrid Drive transmission (L110/ L110F)

In 2006 and 2007, a further development of the HSD drivetrain, under the Lexus Hybrid Drive name, was fitted to the Lexus GS 450h / LS 600h sedans as the L110 transmission. Previous versions of HSD/THS were fitted to transaxles used with front-wheel drive platforms; Lexus Hybrid Drive applied the two-motor HSD concept to a longitudinal transmission for rear-wheel drive vehicles. This system uses two clutches (or brakes, on R2 and S3) to switch the second motor's gear ratio to the wheels between a ratio of 3.9 and 1.9, for low and high speed driving regimes respectively. This decreases the power flowing from MG1 to MG2 (or vice versa) during higher speeds. The electrical path is only about 70% efficient, thus decreasing its power flow while increasing the overall performance of the transmission. The second planetary gearset is extended with a second carrier and sun gear to a ravigneaux-type gear with four shafts, two of which can be held still alternatively by a brake/clutch.

The GS 450h and LS 600h systems utilized rear-wheel drive and all-wheel drive drivetrains, respectively, and were designed to be more powerful than non-hybrid versions of the same model lines, while providing comparable engine class efficiency.

Schematic diagram of updated rear-wheel Hybrid Synergy Drive transmission (L210/ L210F)

A simplified version was released in 2012 with the fourteenth generation Crown (S210); the L210 transmission omits the two clutches but retains the second planetary gearset (MSRD) applied to the output of MG2, in common with other Generation 3 transaxles. However, compared to the G3 transaxles, instead of coupling the two ring gears, the L210 couples the PSD ring gear (R1) to the MSRD planetary gear carrier (P2), and grounds the ring gear of the MSRD (R2) instead of the planetary gear carrier.

=== Generation 4 ===
Schematic diagram of Fourth-Generation Hybrid Synergy Drive transaxle (P610/ P71x/ P810/ P910)

On 13 October 2015, Toyota announced details of the Fourth Generation Hybrid Synergy Drive which was introduced for the 2016 model year. The overall design returns to a single planetary gearset similar to THS/THS-II; parallel reduction gears on the Fourth Generation transaxles replace the Motor Speed Reduction Device, which is a second planetary gear set found in the Third Generation transaxles. The transaxle and traction motor have been redesigned, delivering a reduction in size and combined weight. The traction motor itself is considerably more compact and gains a better power-to-weight ratio. Notably there is a 20 percent reduction in mechanical losses due to friction compared to the previous model. The 2012– Prius c retains the P510 transaxle. The P610 transaxle employs helical gears rather than the straight-cut spur gears employed in the earlier transaxles, and which run more smoothly and quietly, while also accommodating higher mechanical loads.

==== G4 all-wheel drive with hybrid transaxle ====
With the Fourth Generation HSD, Toyota is also offering a four-wheel drive option, dubbed "E-Four", similar to the 2005 RX400h and Highlander Hybrid, in which an electric traction motor is added to the rear, but is not mechanically coupled to the internal combustion engine or front inverter. In fact, the "E-Four" system has its own rear inverter, although this inverter draws power from the same hybrid battery as the front inverter. "E-Four" began being offered in Prius models in the United States in the 2019 model year. "E-Four" is an integral part of the RAV4 Hybrid models offered in the United States, and all such RAV4 Hybrids are "E-Four" only.

==== G4 rear-wheel drive (Multistage THS-II) ====
Fourth Generation L310 / L310F Hybrid Synergy Drive transmission for rear-wheel drive vehicles

The L310 transmission for rear-wheel drive applications succeeded the prior L110 transmission in premium vehicles. Compared to the L110 and L210, the L310 couples MG2 to the ring gear of the PSD (R1). In addition L310 adds a third planetary gearset, compounded with the second (MSRD) by coupling the planetary gear carrier of the second planetary gearset (P2) with the ring gear of the third planetary gearset (R3), and by coupling the ring gear of the second (R2) with the planetary gear carrier of the third (P3).

In addition, several rotating clutches and brakes have been added, including a one-way clutch on the planetary gear carrier of the second planetary gearset (P2). By selectively engaging these, the transmission can simulate ten different gear ratios.

=== Generation 5 ===
The fifth generation Hybrid Synergy Drive started to appear in 2023 (MY23).

The mechanism is similar to the previous generation, but the electric motors have been improved and are now lighter, more compact and more powerful (18bhp).

Some configurations have also switched to using Li-ion batteries (v. NiMH) which also offers a size/weight reduction for better performance.

== List of vehicles with HSD technology ==
The following is a list of vehicles with Hybrid Synergy Drive and related technologies (Toyota Hybrid System):

- Toyota Prius
  - Generation 1: December 1997–October 2003
  - Generation 2: October 2003–late 2009
  - Generation 3: Late 2009–late 2015
  - Generation 4: Late 2015–2022
  - Generation 5: Early 2023–present
- Toyota Estima Hybrid
  - June 2001–December 2005
  - June 2006–October 2019
- Toyota Alphard HEV
  - July 2003 – March 2008
  - September 2011–present
- Lexus RX 400h / Toyota Harrier Hybrid (March 2005–present)
- Toyota Highlander/Kluger Hybrid
  - with THS I: July 2005–September 2008
  - with THS II: October 2008–present
- Lexus GS 450h (March 2006–present)
- Toyota Camry HEV (May 2006–present)
- Lexus LS 500h/LS 600h/LS 600hL (April 2007–2025)
- Toyota A-BAT (concept truck)
- Nissan Altima Hybrid (2007–2011)
- Toyota Crown (April 2008–present)
- Lexus RX 450h (2009–present)
- Toyota Sai (2009–2017)
- Lexus HS 250h (July 2009–March 2018)
- Lexus CT 200h (December 2010–October 2022)
- Toyota Auris (July 2010–2018)
- Toyota Prius V (May 2011–March 2021)
- Toyota Aqua (December 2011–present)
- Toyota Prius Plug-in Hybrid/Prime (January 2012-present)
- Toyota Prius c (March 2012–2021)
- Toyota Yaris HEV (March 2012–present)
- Toyota Yaris Cross HEV (XP210; August 2020–present)
- Toyota Yaris Cross HEV (AC200; June 2023–present)
- Lexus ES 300h (July 2012–December 2025)
- Toyota Avalon Hybrid (November 2012–present)
- Toyota Corolla Axio (August 2013–present)
- Toyota Corolla Fielder (August 2013–present)
- Toyota Crown Majesta (2013–2018)
- Lexus IS 300h (2013–present)
- Lexus GS 300h (2013–present)
- Lexus NX 300h (August 2014–November 2021)
- Toyota RAV4 HEV (2015–present)
- Lexus RC 300h (2015–present)
- Toyota Sienta Hybrid (2015–present)
- Toyota C-HR Hybrid (2016–present)
- Lexus LC 500h (2018)
- Toyota Corolla HEV (June 2018–present)
  - HSD Gen 4: 2018–2022
  - HSD Gen 5: 2023–present
- Lexus UX 250h/260h/300h (December 2018-present)
- Subaru Crosstrek Hybrid
  - 2019–2023
  - 2026–present
- Toyota RAV4 Plug-in Hybrid/Prime (June 2020-present)
- Toyota Corolla Cross HEV (July 2020–present)
- Toyota Sienna Hybrid (September 2020–present)
- Lexus NX 350h/NX 450h+ (December 2021-present)
- Lexus RX 450h+ (October 2022-present)
- Toyota Urban Cruiser Hyryder/Suzuki Grand Vitara Hybrid (2022–present)
- Toyota Innova HEV (2022–present)]
- Toyota Grand Highlander Hybrid (August 2023-present)
- Toyota Crown Signia (June 2024-present)
- Mazda CX-50 Hybrid (2025–present)
- Subaru Forester Hybrid (2025–present)
- Lexus ES 350h (December 2025-present)

== Patent issues ==
Jerry D. Washington Jr. VS. Toyota Motor North America, Inc. and Toyota Motor Corporation

Washington received a patent for an improved system and method for generating power. https://patents.google.com/patent/US7108095B1/en?oq=7108095. In August of 2024, Washington filed 2:2024cv00661 in the U.S. District Court for the Eastern District of Texas. The complaint alleges that the MG2 and MG1 rotors are kinetic energy storage devices, or flywheels, that use gears to increase the MG1 and MG2 rotor speeds before speed-decreasing gears slow the rotors, allowing motor-generator sizing to be smaller. Toyota HSD systems with MSR gearing allow higher max RPMs, dramatically increasing the specific power of both MG1 and MG2.

https://dockets.justia.com/docket/texas/txedce/2:2024cv00661/232218

=== Antonov ===
In the autumn of 2005, the Antonov Automotive Technology BV Plc company sued Toyota, the Lexus brand mother company, over alleged patent infringement relating to key components in the RX 400h's drivetrain and the Toyota Prius hybrid compact car. The case had been pending since April 2005, but settlement negotiations did not bring a mutually acceptable result. Antonov eventually took legal recourse in the German court system, where decisions are usually made relatively swiftly. The patent holder sought to impose a levy on each vehicle sold, which could have made the hybrid SUV less competitive. Toyota fought back by seeking to officially invalidate Antonov's relevant patents.

On 1 September 2006 Antonov announced that the Federal Patent Court in Munich did not uphold the validity of the German part of Antonov's patent (EP0414782) against Toyota. A few days later, a court in Düsseldorf ruled that the Toyota Prius driveline and the Lexus RX 400h driveline do not breach the Antonov hybrid CVT patent.

=== Ford ===
Ford Motor Company independently developed a system with key technologies similar to Toyota's HSD technology in 2004. As a result, Ford licensed 21 patents from Toyota in exchange for patents relating to emissions technology.

=== Paice ===
Paice LLC received a patent for an improved hybrid vehicle with a controllable torque transfer unit (US patent 5343970, Severinsky; Alex J., "Hybrid electric vehicle", issued 1994-09-06) and has additional patents related to hybrid vehicles. In 2010 Toyota agreed to license Paice's patents; terms of the settlement were not disclosed. In the settlement "The parties agree that, although certain Toyota vehicles have been found to be equivalent to a Paice patent, Toyota invented, designed and developed the Prius and Toyota's hybrid technology independent of any inventions of Dr. Severinsky and Paice as part of Toyota's long history of innovation". Paice earlier entered into an agreement with Ford for the license of Paice's patent.

== Comparison with other hybrids ==
Aisin Seiki Co., minority-owned by Toyota, supplies its versions of the HSD transmission system to Ford for use as the HF35 "Powersplit" eCVT in the first-generation Ford Escape hybrid and Ford Fusion Hybrid. An updated version of this transmission was used in the 2013-2020 Ford Fusion Hybrid/Energi and the 2013-2018 Ford C-Max Hybrid/Energi. A further updated version (HF45) is used in the 2020-present Ford Escape Hybrid/Plug-in Hybrid.

Nissan licensed Toyota's HSD for use in the Nissan Altima hybrid, using the same Aisin Seiki T110 transaxle as in the Toyota Camry Hybrid. The 2011 Infiniti M35h uses a different system of one electric motor and two clutches.

In 2010, Toyota and Mazda announced a supply agreement for the hybrid technology used in Toyota's Prius model.

General Motors, DaimlerChrysler's and BMW's Global Hybrid Cooperation is similar in that it combines the power from a single engine and two motors. In 2009, the Presidential Task Force on the Auto Industry said that "GM is at least one generation behind Toyota on advanced, 'green' powertrain development".*(GM was involved in developing the hybrid system and released the PHEV Chevrolet Volt a year later)

In contrast, Honda's Integrated Motor Assist uses a more traditional ICE and transmission where the flywheel is replaced with an electric motor, thereby retaining the complexity of a traditional transmission. AWD versions of Honda vehicles also differ from Toyota variations, with a traditional driveshaft and electronic differential arrangement to power the rear wheels instead of a separate electric motor.

== Aftermarket ==
Some early non-production plug-in hybrid electric vehicle conversions have been based on the version of HSD found in the 2004 and 2005 model year Prius. Early lead–acid battery conversions by CalCars have demonstrated 10 miles (16 km) of ev-only and 20 miles (32 km) of double mileage mixed-mode range. A company planning to offer conversions to consumers named EDrive systems will be using Valence Li-ion batteries and have 35 miles (56 km) of electric range. Both of these systems leave the existing HSD system mostly unchanged and could be similarly applied to other hybrid powertrain flavors by simply replacing the stock NiMH batteries with a higher capacity battery pack and a charger to refill them for about $0.03 per mile from standard household outlets.

== See also ==
- Mild hybrid
- Hybrid car
- Inverter (electrical)
- Insulated Gate Bipolar Transistor
- Variable-frequency drive
- Global Hybrid Cooperation
- Integrated Motor Assist
- List of hybrid vehicles
