= Toyota Prius (XW10) =

Automobile

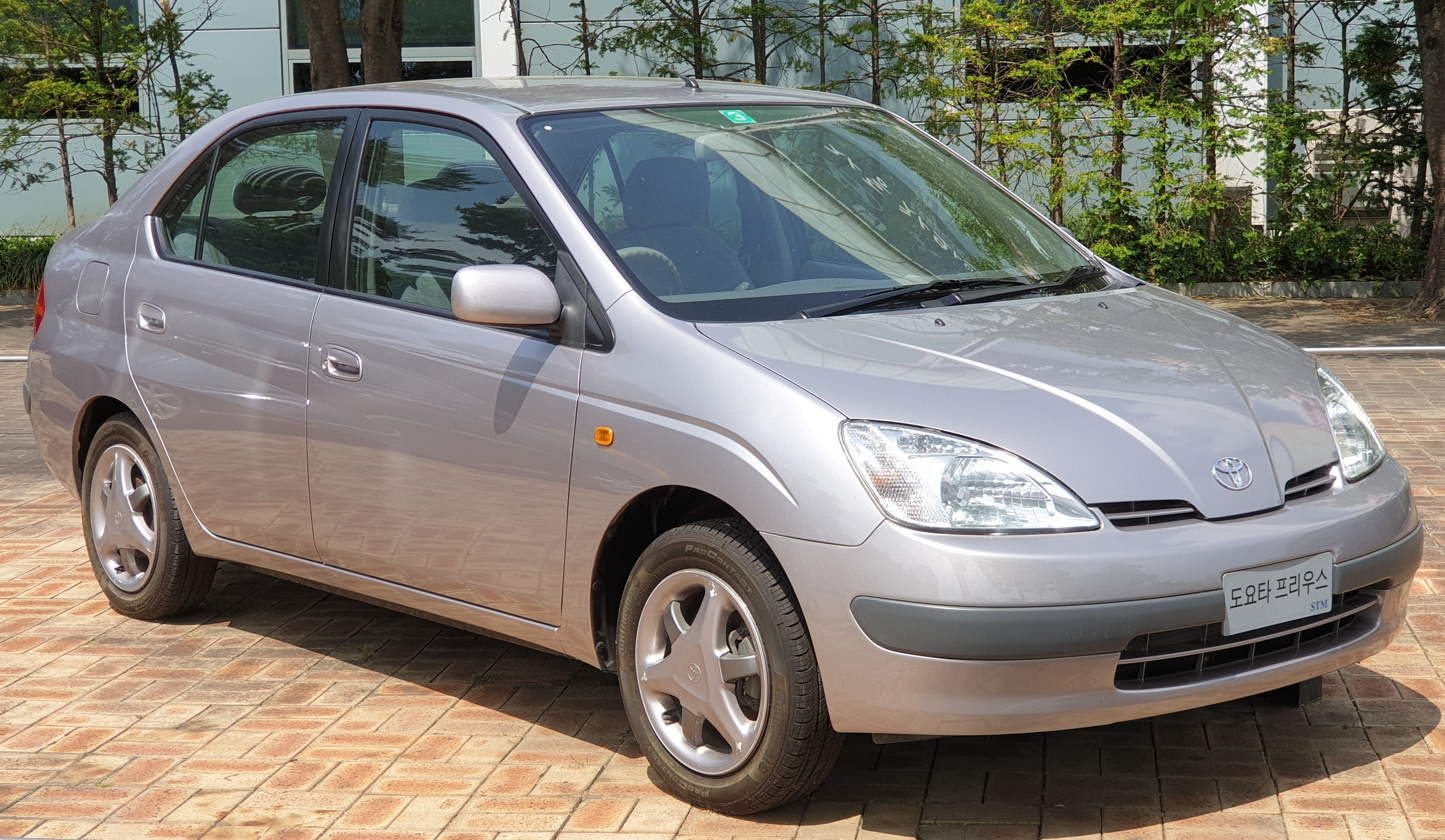

Overview
- Manufacturer: Toyota
- Production: 1997–2001 (NHW10); September 2000–2003 (NHW11)
- Model years: 2001–2003
- Assembly: Toyota, Aichi, Japan (Takaoka Plant, later Motomachi plant)
- Designer: Risuke Kubochi

Body and chassis
- Class: Subcompact car
- Body style: 4-door sedan
- Layout: Front-engine, front-wheel-drive
- Platform: Toyota MC platform

Powertrain
- Engine: NHW10; Toyota Hybrid System; Gasoline: 1.5 L 1NZ-FXE DOHC I4; 13.5:1 compression 43 kW (58 hp) @ 4000 rpm 102 N·m (75 lb·ft) @ 4000 rpm Electric: 288 V motor 30 kW (40 hp) @ 940 rpm 305 N·m (225 lb·ft) @ 0 rpm NHW11; Toyota Hybrid System; Gasoline: 1.5 L 1NZ-FXE DOHC I4 VVT-i; 13.0:1 compression 52 kW (70 hp) @ 4500 rpm 110 N·m (82 lb·ft) @ 4200 rpm Electric: 273.6 V motor 33 kW (44 hp) @ 1040 rpm 350 N·m (258 lb·ft) @ 0 rpm SULEV
- Transmission: 1-speed planetary gear
- Hybrid drivetrain: Power-split Hybrid
- Battery: 1.78 kWh, Ni-MH, 273.6 V, 6.5 Ah

Dimensions
- Wheelbase: 2,550 mm (100.4 in)
- Length: NHW10: 4,275 mm (168.3 in); NHW11: 4,308 mm (169.6 in)
- Width: 1,695 mm (66.7 in)
- Height: NHW10: 1,491 mm (58.7 in); NHW11: 1,463 mm (57.6 in)
- Curb weight: NHW11: 1,254 kg (2,765 lb)

Chronology
- Successor: Toyota Prius (XW20)

The Toyota Prius (XW10) is a subcompact hybrid car that was produced by Toyota between 1997 and 2003 in Japan. The XW10 is divided into the NHW10 and its NHW11 counterpart, both of which represent the first generation of Prius series. The Toyota Prius is the first mass-produced hybrid car, and was released 2 years ahead of other manufacturers. While the NHW10 was available exclusively to Japan, it was subsequently introduced to worldwide markets in September 2000 with the NHW11. Toyota sold about 123,000 first generation Prius. Toyota's XW10 series Prius is notable as the first vehicle based on the Toyota MC platform.

== Overview ==
On 16 January 1992, the Toyota Motor Corporation announced the Earth Charter, a document outlining goals to develop and market low-emission vehicles.

In September 1993, Toyota R&D Executive Vice President Yoshirio Kimbara created G21, a committee to research cars for the 21st century. On 1 February 1994, the first official meeting of the G21 project team took place. The team determined the goal of G21 is to create a car that is resource and environmentally friendly while retaining the benefits of modern cars. The development effort was led by Takehisa Yaegashi, who was tasked with building a car that bridged the gap between electric and gasoline powered vehicles.

In 1994, Toyota executive Takeshi Uchiyamada was given the task of creating a new car that would be both fuel efficient and environmentally friendly. In late 1994, the G21 team designed a concept car with a hybrid engine for the 1995 Tokyo Motor Show. The vehicle was named "Prius," the Latin word for "prior" or "before." It was shown on 27 October 1995. In late 1996, test driving began.

After reviewing over 100 hybrid designs, the engineering team ultimately settled on a continuously variable transmission (CVT) design based largely on a 2000 TRW patent application, but many technical and engineering problems had to be solved within the three years that the team was given to bring the car to the Japanese market, a goal they barely achieved as the first Prius went on sale in December 1997. One major problem was the longevity of the battery, which needed to last between 7 and 10 years. The solution the engineers came up with was to keep the battery pack between 60% and 40% charged, proving to be the "sweet spot" for extending the battery life to roughly that of the other car components. A Toyota spokesperson stated that "Toyota chose this name because the Prius vehicle is the predecessor of cars to come."

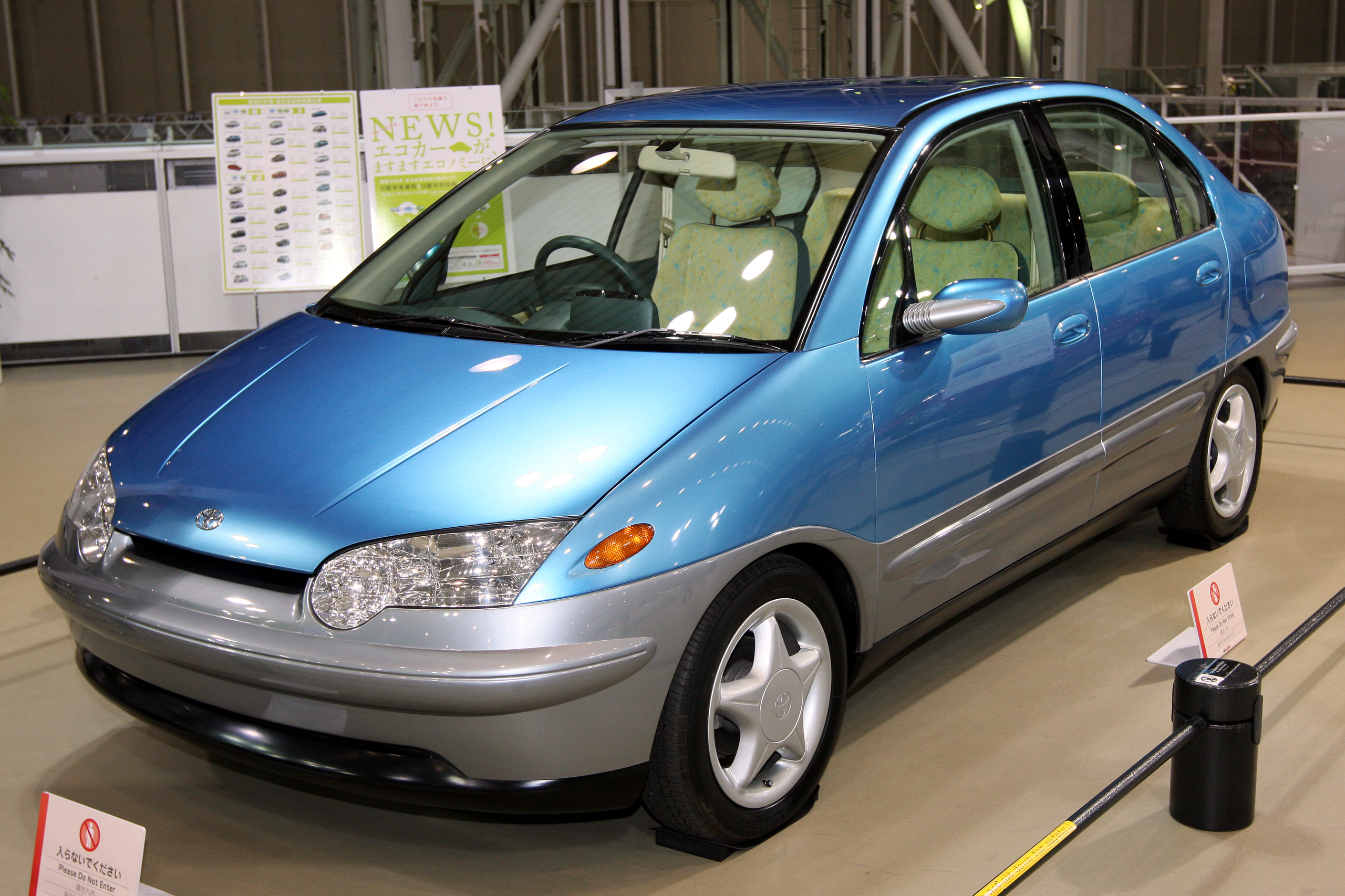
1995 Prius prototype (front)

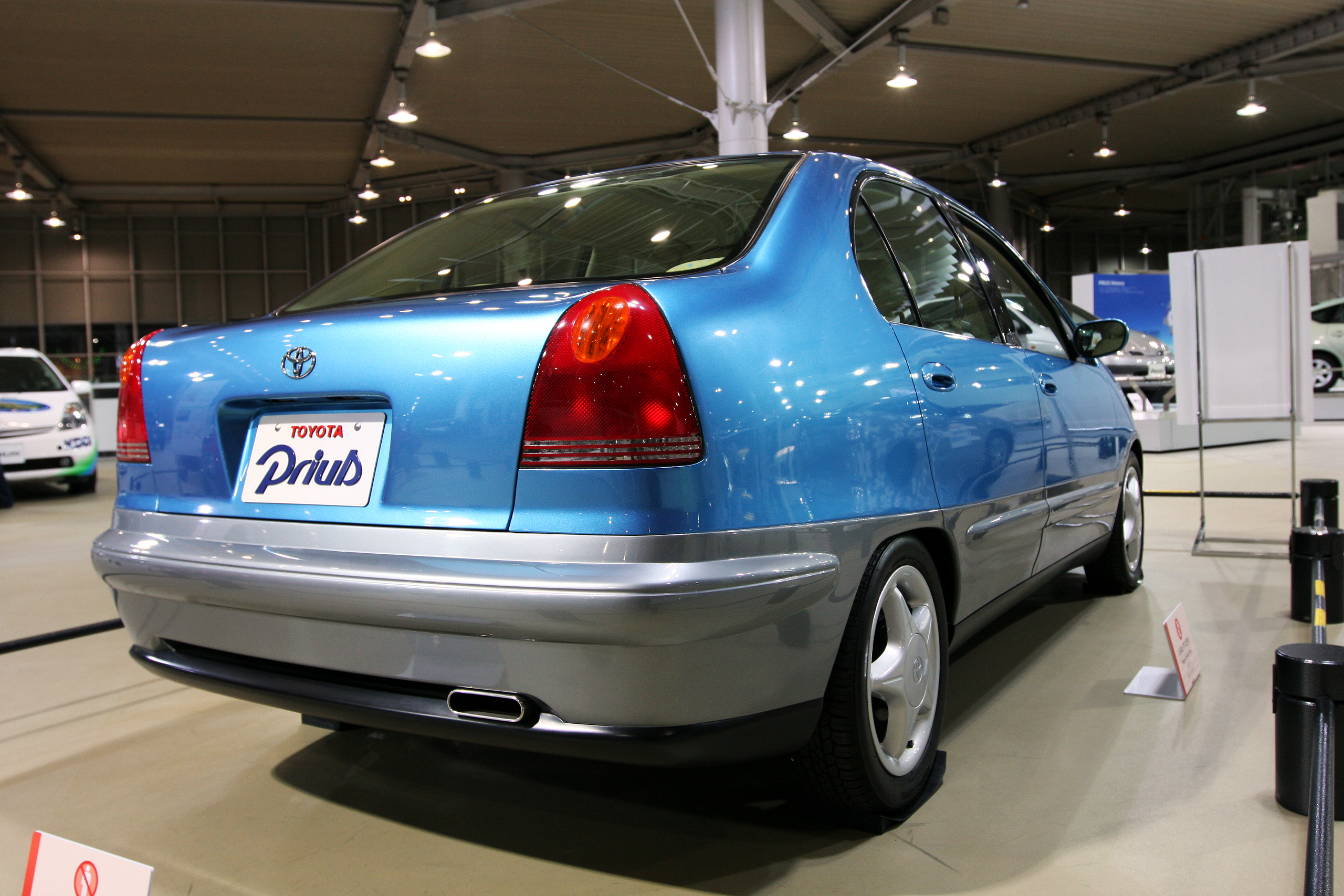
1995 Prius prototype (rear)

== Markets ==
The XW10 was initially manufactured at the Takaoka plant, but would later be moved to the Motomachi plant in Toyota City, Aichi, Japan.

=== Japan ===
The first Prius, model NHW10, went on sale on 10 December 1997. It was available only in Japan, though it has been imported privately to at least the United Kingdom, Australia, and New Zealand. Many of these cars were exported as second-hand vehicles to New Zealand and other countries. In New Zealand, there is report that high voltage battery failures are common among grey imports of the NHW10, which are not supported by official distributors outside Japan.

To handle the voltage between the battery and electric motor, the semiconductor core inverter unit was modeled on heavy-duty transistors used by the Shinkansen bullet train. The first production model NHW10 Toyota Prius was rolled out of Toyota's Takoka factory in Toyota City, Aichi near Nagoya in December 1997, followed by the start of two years of Japan-only sales.

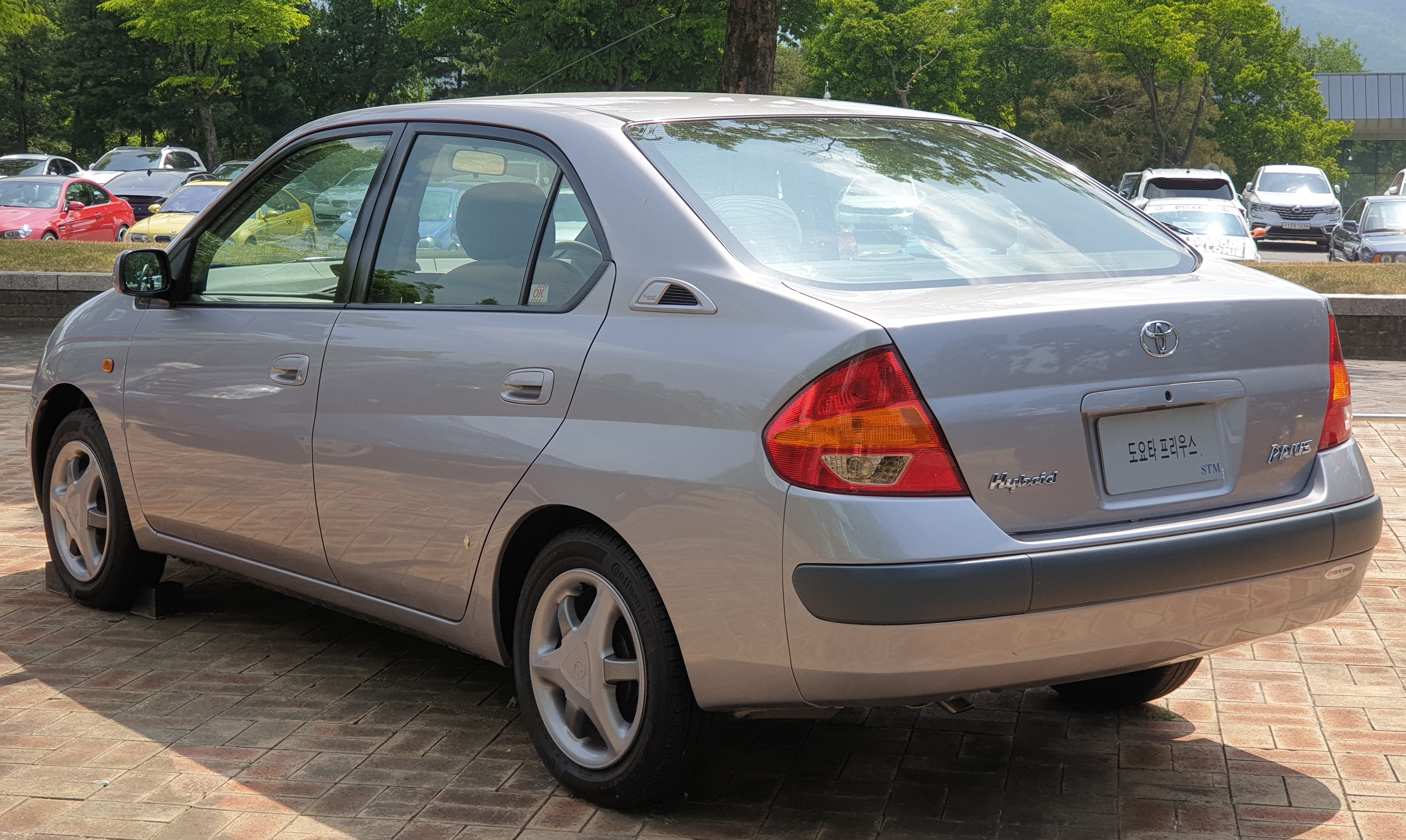
NHW10 Toyota Prius

As uncovered by engineer testing, the NHW10 Prius was vulnerable to reduced performance in hotter climates and at higher altitudes; as a result, early examples featured an instrument-panel indicator warning should the hybrid system be in danger of shutting down. This gauge, designed in the shape of a turtle, was used until 1999.

The first generation Prius, at its launch, became the world's first mass-produced gasoline-electric hybrid car. Japan sales goals were 12,000 units annually, at a price of US$16,929 per vehicle. The vehicle's introduction served as Toyota's launch effort for a new generation of 'green' vehicles aimed at reducing air pollution and increasing fuel efficiency. Toyota initially forecasted that hybrids will account for a third of the world's auto market as early as 2005.

The NHW10 Prius styling originated from California designers, who were selected over competing designs from other Toyota design studios.

=== Other markets ===
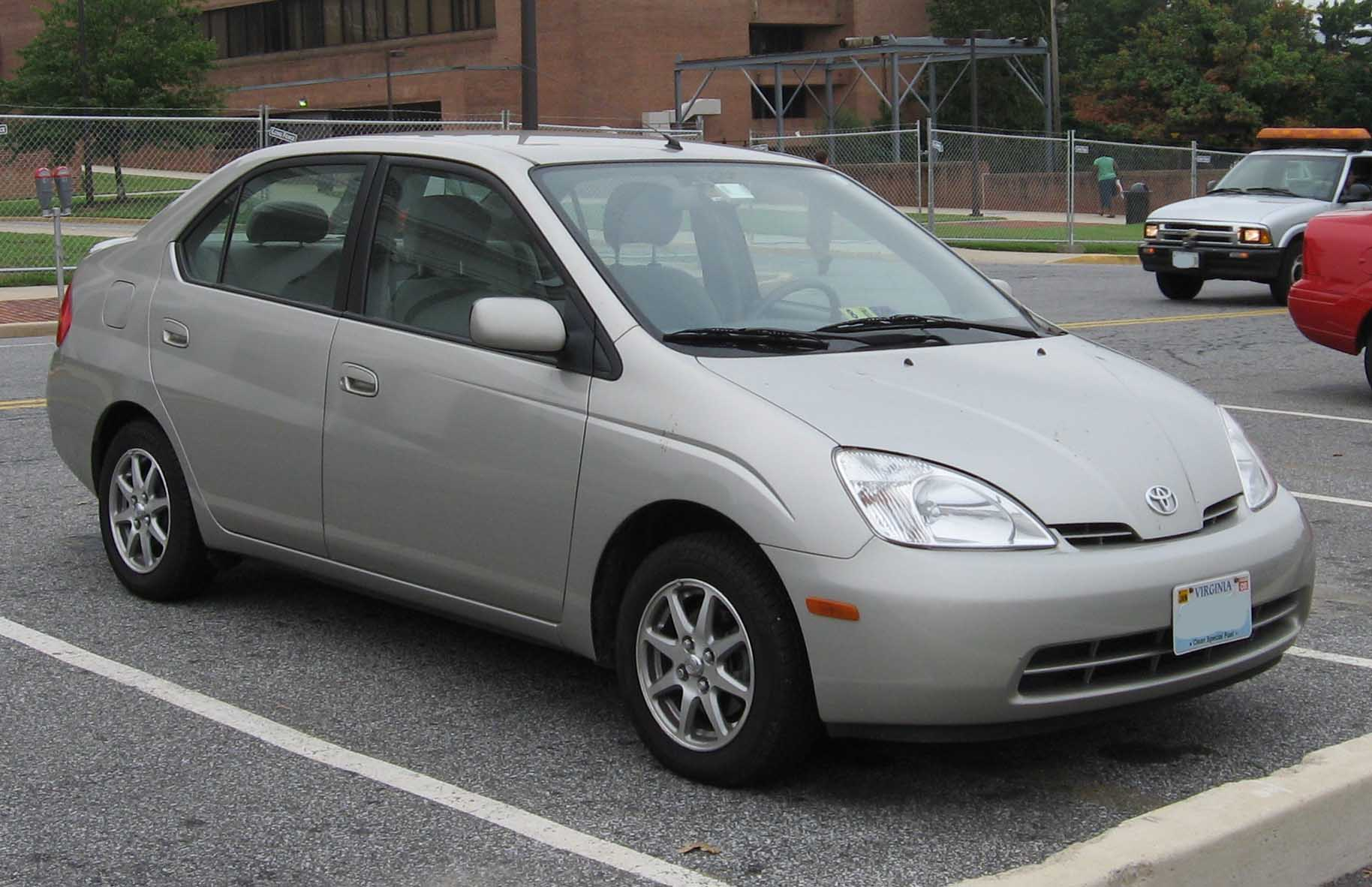
2001–2003 Toyota Prius (NHW11, US)

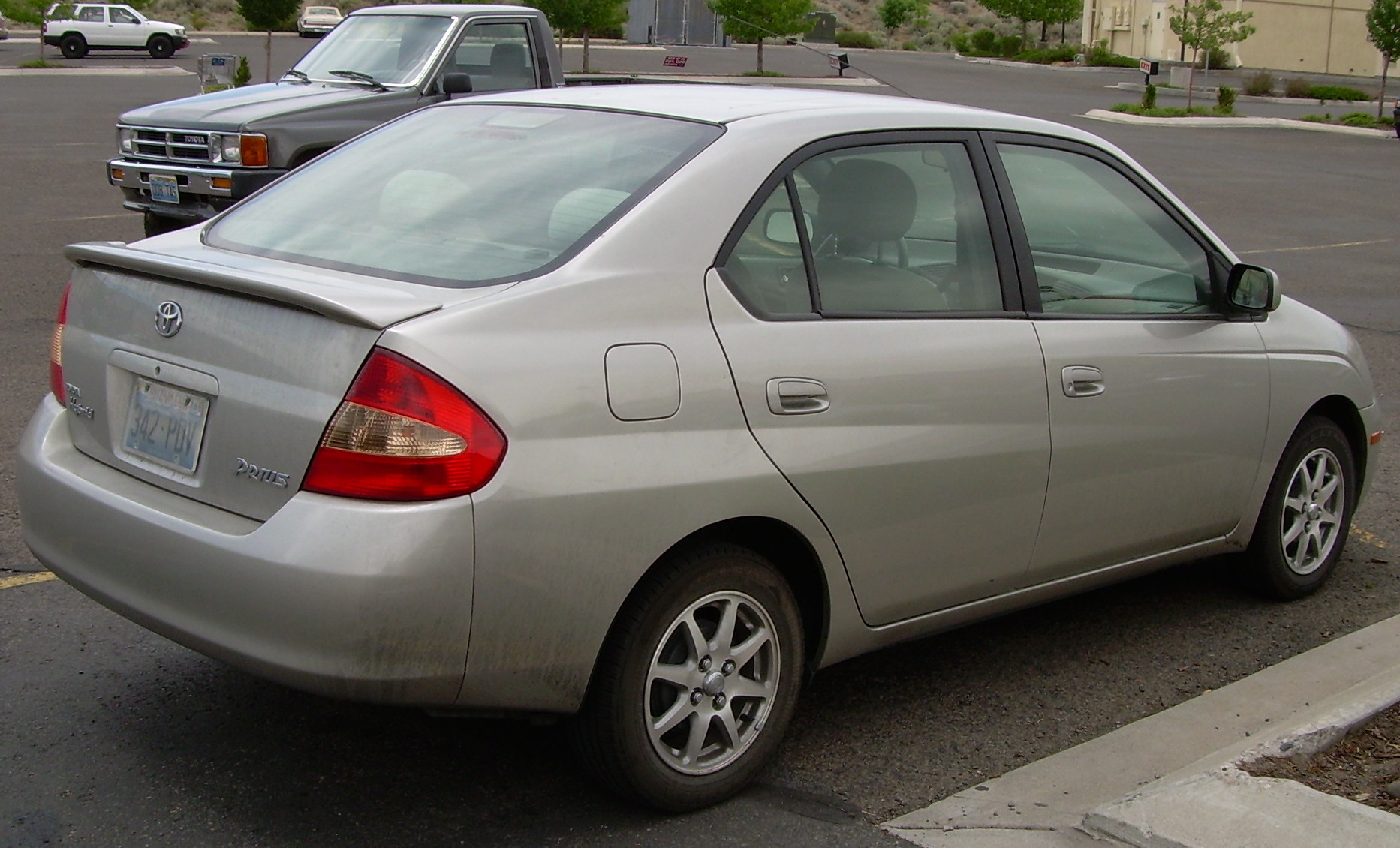
2002 Toyota Prius (NHW11)

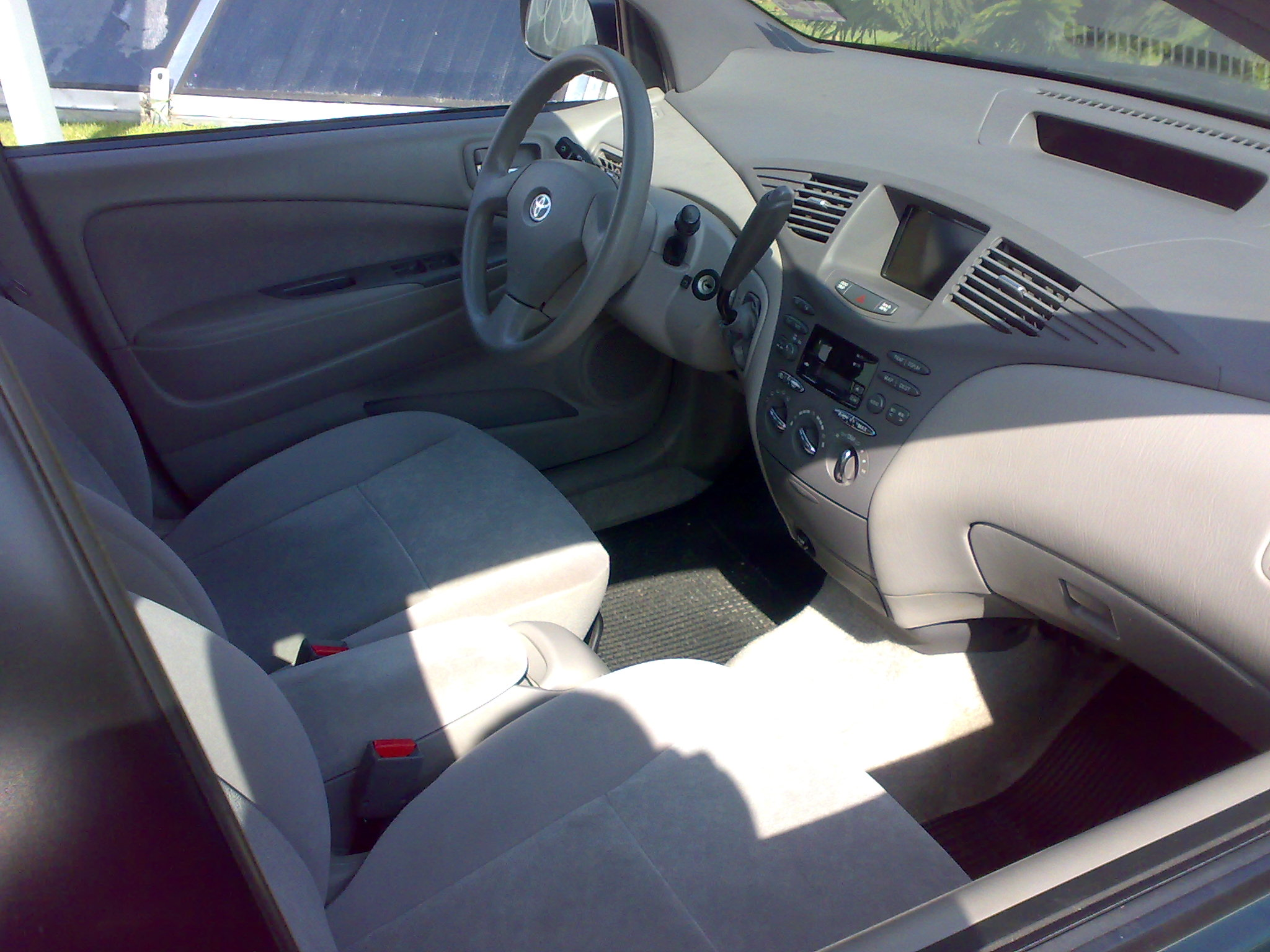
Interior

The 2001–2003 model year Prius for the United States market (NHW11) was powered by a 1.5-liter Atkinson cycle four-cylinder gasoline engine, a permanent magnet AC electric motor, and a nickel-metal hydride (Ni-Mh) battery pack of just 1.78 kWh (Voltage: 273.6 V; Capacity: 6.5 Ah). The gasoline engine developed 70 hp (52 kW) and 82 ft⋅lbf (111 N⋅m) of torque. The electric motor generated a maximum of 44 hp (33 kW) and 258 ft⋅lbf (350 N⋅m) of torque.

The NHW11 Prius became more powerful partly to satisfy the higher speeds and longer distances that North Americans drive. Air conditioning was standard equipment.

The vehicle was the second mass-produced hybrid on the American market, after the two-seat Honda Insight. While the larger Prius could seat five, its battery pack restricted cargo space. The vehicle interior featured a dash-mounted shift lever and a small touchscreen with a hybrid powertrain display. This feature showed the vehicle operation regarding the interplay between gasoline engine, battery pack, and electric motors and could also show a bar-graph of fuel economy results.

In the United States, the NHW11 was the first Prius to be sold. The Prius was marketed between the smaller Echo and the larger Corolla. The published retail price of the car was US$19,995. The California Air Resources Board (CARB) classified the car as a Super Ultra Low Emission Vehicle (SULEV). At one time, Prius owners were eligible for up to a US$2,000 tax deduction from their gross income. In contrast with the prior NHW10 model, Toyota executives claimed that the company broke even financially on sales of the NHW11 Prius.

European sales began in September 2000. The official launch of the Prius in Australia occurred in 2001 after the 2001 Sydney Motor Show, although sales were slow until the NHW20 model arrived.

In 2006, Toyota recalled about 8,500 2001 and 2002 model year Prius vehicles because of an incorrectly manufactured crankshaft position sensor.

In 2009, after being investigated by the California Air Resources Board, Toyota extended a campaign nationwide for owners of MY 2001–2003 Prius for starting problems caused by improper working throttle body that led to electronic control module malfunction.

=== Fuel consumption ===
==== United States ====
In the United States, the Environmental Protection Agency (EPA) test results must be posted on new vehicle windows, and are the only fuel consumption figures that can be advertised. The following are current official EPA figures for the 2001-2003 model years, based on its 2008 restructuring of fuel economy tests:

- 42 mpg_{‑US} (5.6 L/100 km; 50 mpg_{‑imp}) city driving
- 41 mpg_{‑US} (5.7 L/100 km; 49 mpg_{‑imp}) highway driving
- 41 mpg_{‑US} (5.7 L/100 km; 49 mpg_{‑imp}) combined

Original listed figures on new vehicle windows, based on pre-2008 testing procedures, for 2001-2003 model years were:

- 52 mpg_{‑US} (4.5 L/100 km; 62 mpg_{‑imp}) city driving
- 45 mpg_{‑US} (5.2 L/100 km; 54 mpg_{‑imp}) highway driving
- 48 mpg_{‑US} (4.9 L/100 km; 58 mpg_{‑imp}) combined

=== Awards ===
- 1997–98 Car of the Year Japan
- 2003 Scientific American names Toyota Motor Corporation as "Business Leader of the Year" ("Scientific American 50"; December, 2003) for its singular accomplishment in the commercialization of affordable hybrid cars.
