= Nissan Patrol =

Series of full-size SUVs by Nissan

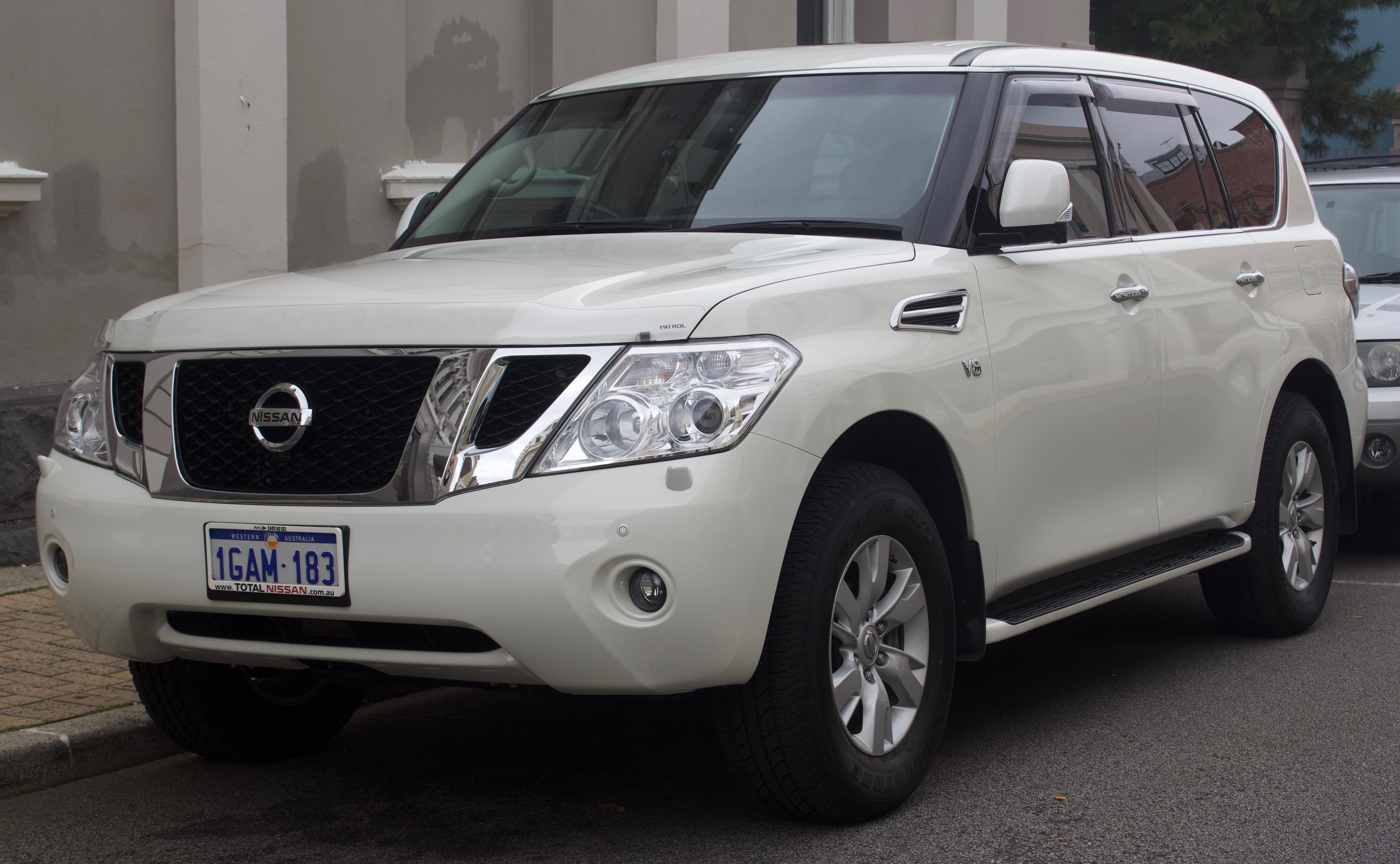

Overview
- Manufacturer: Nissan
- Also called: Datsun Patrol (until 1984); Nissan Safari (Japan, 1980–2007); Nissan Armada (North America, 2016–present)
- Production: 1951–present

Body and chassis
- Class: Off-road vehicle; Full-size SUV
- Layout: Front-engine, four-wheel-drive (1951–present); Front-engine, rear-wheel-drive (1980–present)
- Chassis: Body-on-frame

The Nissan Patrol (Japanese: 日産・パトロール, Hepburn: Nissan Patorōru) is a series of off-road vehicles and full-size SUVs manufactured by Nissan in Japan since 1951 and sold throughout the world. It is Nissan's longest running series of models.

The Patrol has been available as either a short-wheelbase (SWB) three-door or a long-wheelbase (LWB) five-door chassis since 1951. The LWB version has been offered in pickup truck and cab chassis variants. Between 1988 and 1994, Ford Australia marketed the Patrol as the Ford Maverick. In some European countries, such as Spain, Ebro marketed the Patrol as the Ebro Patrol. In 1980 in Japan, it was rebadged and alternately sold at Nissan Prince Store locations as the Nissan Safari.

The Patrol has traditionally competed with the Toyota Land Cruiser in most world markets and is available in Australia, Central and South America, South Africa, parts of Southeast Asia, and Western Europe, as well as Iran and the Middle East. For the 2011 model year, it was made available in North America as the upscale Infiniti QX56 (later renamed as Infiniti QX80), the first time that a Patrol-based vehicle had been sold in North America since 1969, and for the 2017 model year, it would be offered in that market as the Nissan Armada.

== First generation (4W60; 1951) ==
First generation
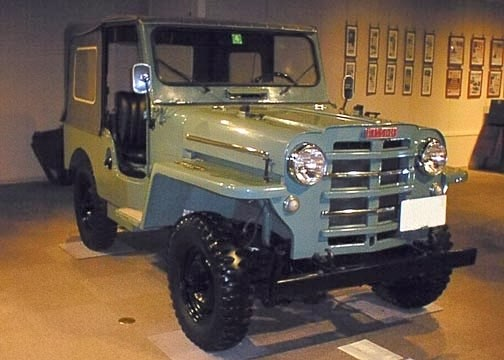

Overview
- Model code: 4W60
- Also called: Nissan Jeep
- Production: 1951–1960
- Assembly: Japan: Hiratsuka; Brazil: São Bernardo do Campo (Varam Motores: CKD)

Body and chassis
- Class: Full-size off-road vehicle
- Body style: 3-door wagon/van; 2-door pickup; fire truck
- Layout: Front-engine, four-wheel-drive
- Related: Willys CJ-3B

Powertrain
- Engine: Petrol: 3.7 L NAK I6; 3.7 L NB I6; 4.0 L NC I6; 4.0 L P I6 (petrol)
- Transmission: 4-speed manual

Dimensions
- Wheelbase: 2,200 mm (86.6 in)
- Length: 3,650 mm (143.7 in)
- Width: 1,740 mm (68.5 in)
- Height: 1,720 mm (67.7 in)
- Curb weight: 1,500 kg (3,306.9 lb)

In September 1951, the 4W60 was introduced exclusively to Japanese Nissan dealerships. The overall styling was similar to the Willys Jeep. The 4W60 used the 75 PS (55 kW) 3.7 L Nissan NAK engine from the Nissan 290 bus, but with part-time four-wheel drive and a four-speed manual transmission. The grille had a pressed-steel Nissan badge. A 4W70 Carrier-based wagon was available.

The 4W61 was introduced in August 1955; it changed the grille (with some chrome bars), a one-piece windshield that sits further back when folded, chrome strips on the hood, and unequally sized seats (passenger's side is wider than the driver's). The other big change was the engine. The 4W61 was powered by the new 3.7 L Nissan NB engine, producing 92 PS (68 kW), and later was powered by the 105 PS (77 kW) 4.0 L Nissan NC engine. The grille badge was chrome and red and said "NISSAN".

In October 1958, the 4W65 Patrol replaced the 4W61. The 4W65 changed the grille, which now had all chrome bars and redesigned front fenders and hood. A "NISSAN" badge was on the grille and "Patrol" badges were added on the sides of the hood. An eight-seater hardtop wagon, the WG4W65, was added. The short-lived 4W66 Patrol was introduced in December 1956, powered by the 125 PS (92 kW) 4.0 L P engine. The 4W66 was discontinued in June 1960. A wagon version of the 4W66 was called the Carrier, from 1956 to 1959.

=== 4W70 series ===
The Nissan 4W70 Carrier was introduced in 1950 loosely based on the Dodge M37. The 4W70 used the M37's chassis, but the 4W60 Patrol's drivetrain. The grille was narrower and the front fenders changed. The 4W72 was introduced in 1955 (the 4W71 designation was skipped) with changes to the hood, grille, and headlights. Power increased to 78 kW (105 hp) due to the new Nissan NC engine. Modifications again to the hood, fenders, and grille and an increase in power to 145 PS (107 kW) led to the 4W73, introduced in 1959 and powered by the Nissan P engine.

Series	Body styles	Engines (petrol)
4W60 series (later named Nissan Patrol)	SWB: soft top (4W60/61/65/66); SWB: fire truck (F4W61/65/66)	NAK/NB/NC/P
Nissan Carrier 4W70/72/73	Troop carrier, weapon carrier	NC/P

== Second generation (60; 1960) ==
Second generation
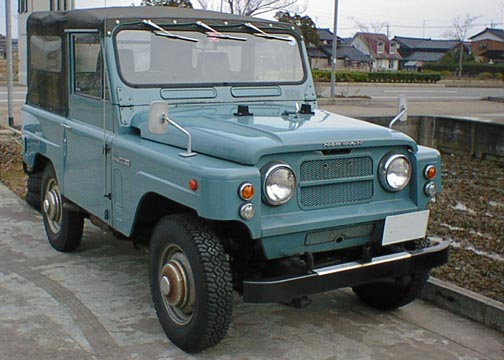

Overview
- Model code: 60
- Also called: Datsun Patrol; Jonga P60 (India)
- Production: 1960–1980
- Assembly: Japan: Hiratsuka; Yokohama; Zama (1960–1980); Philippines: Makati (1961–1983); India: Jabalpur (1965–1999); South Africa: Rosslyn (1965–1983)

Body and chassis
- Class: Full-size off-road vehicle
- Body style: 3-door hardtop; 3-door softtop; 3-door wagon/van; 2-door pickup; fire truck
- Layout: Front-engine, four-wheel-drive

Powertrain
- Engine: Petrol: 4.0 L P I6
- Transmission: 3/4-speed manual

Dimensions
- Wheelbase: 2,200–2,800 mm (86.6–110.2 in)
- Length: 3,650–4,250 mm (143.7–167.3 in)
- Width: 1,740 mm (68.5 in)
- Height: 1,720 mm (67.7 in)

The soft-top Nissan Patrol 60 (two-door; 2,200 mm (86.6 in) wheelbase) and G60 (two-door; 2,500 mm (98.4 in) wheelbase) were introduced in October 1960. Left-hand drive L60/GL60 models were also built, for various export markets.

The fire truck variant was sold under the name "Patrol Fire Truck", and was deployed throughout the Japan, not just in mountain and snow country, thanks to the water-discharging capabilities of its A2-class pump, which took advantage of its large-displacement engine. The Fire Patrol was also available in a Two-wheel drive version that omitted the front wheel drive unit, and was distinguished by the lack of a 4x4 badge, transfer lever, sub-transmission lever, or front axle differential. However, all Fire Patrols were equipped with a PTO lever that connected and disconnected power to the pump.

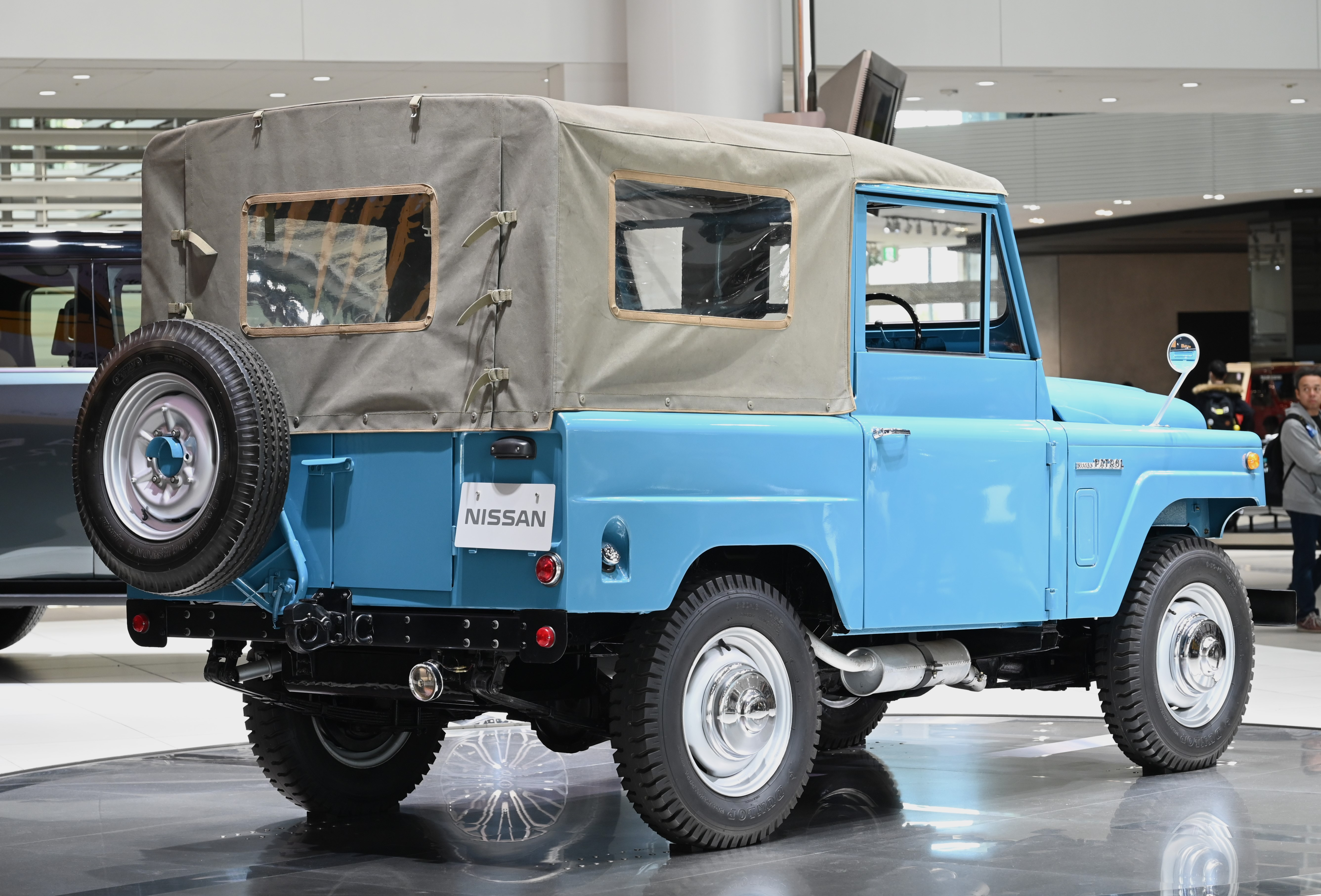
Rear view (1972)

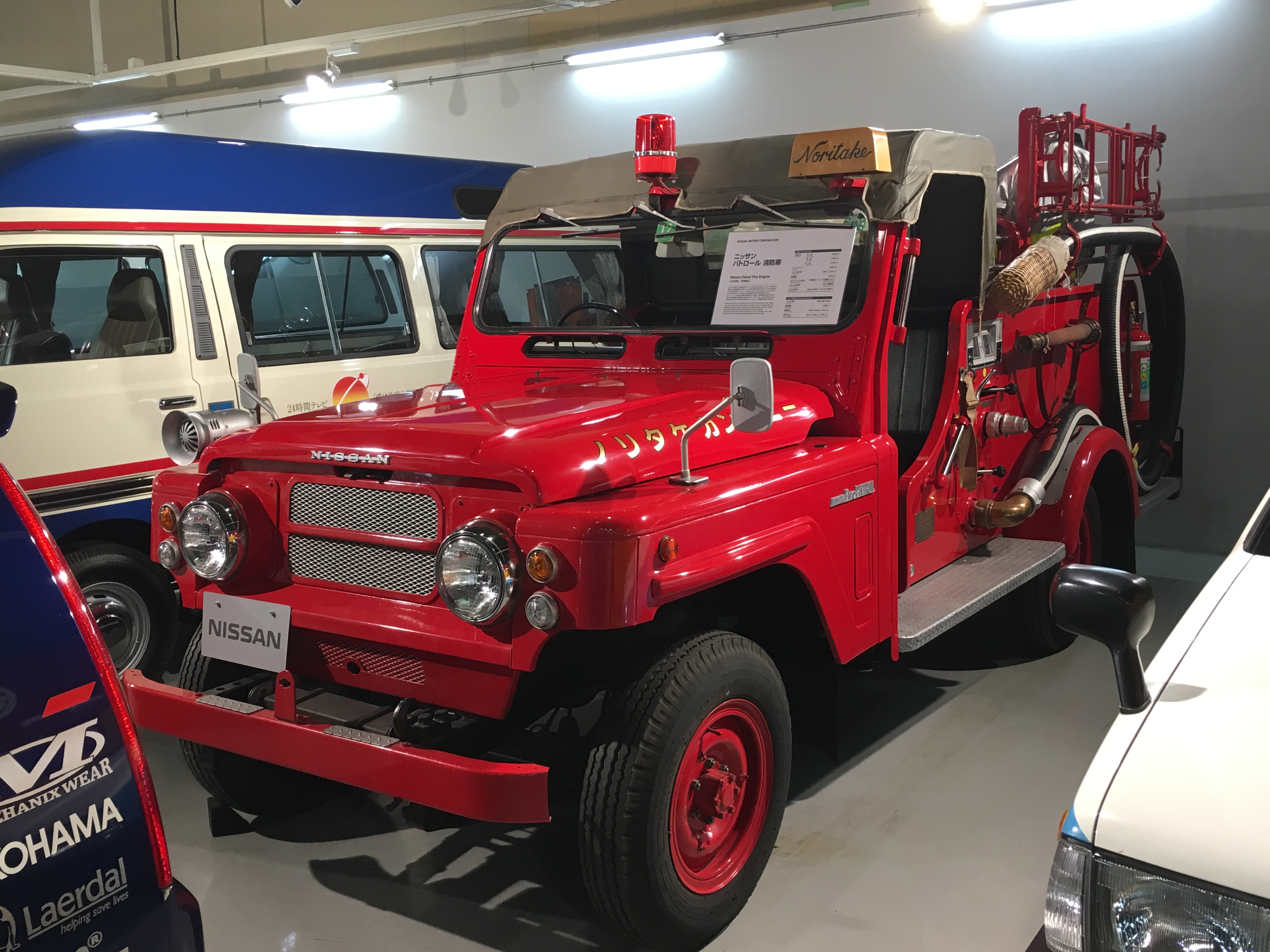
Nissan Patrol Fire Truck

Canadian and American customers could get Patrols from 1962 until 1969. Nissan Patrols were sold through Datsun dealerships, making it the only Nissan-badged vehicle sold in the US until the early 1980s, when the Datsun marque was phased out (barring a small test batch of about 100 Nissan Cedrics that was also exported to the US in the early 60s). An extra-long wheelbase version, the H60, was also available.

The 4WD Nissan Patrol 60 series was produced in short, medium, and long wheelbase versions. It had a manual transmission type-F3B83L at first with three and later with four speeds, and a two-speed transfer case with part-time four-wheel drive. The motor was the P engine, a 3,956 cc (241.4 cu in) inline overhead-valve six-cylinder, featuring bathtub-shaped combustion chambers and a fully balanced seven-bearing crank shaft. With two doors in front and one at the back and four seats (driver and companion in front, two parallel back seats), the extra-long wheelbase version (the H60) was available with eight-passenger capacity.

In 1963, the KG60 (and KGL60) hard-top models were introduced.

Nissan Australia claimed that the 60 series Patrol was the first vehicle to drive across the Simpson Desert in Australia, and built much publicity around the 50th anniversary of the event, including a re-enactment with a similar vehicle ending on 21 July 2012 to publicise the impending release of their new-generation Y62.

Series	Body styles			Engines (petrol)
60 series	60 (SWB)	G60 (LWB)	H60 (Super LWB)	P engine
60 series	60 soft top K60 hard top	WG60 station wagon G60H-A cab/chassis 62ZG60H pickup truck	VH60 van FH60 fire truck	P engine

=== Jonga ===
Beginning around 1969, the Indian Army's Vehicle Factory Jabalpur began assembling the quarter-ton Nissan Patrol as the Jonga, along with the Nissan 4W73. The name as per Indian army records is an acronym for Jabalpur Ordinance aNd Guncarriage Assembly. Both the Nissan vehicles were fitted with the same engines and shared many parts. The Jonga was briefly sold to civilian customers with a 4.0-litre Hino diesel engine in 1996, but demand was low, due to an uncompetitive price, as well as unappealing looks. Less than 200 units were sold. The Jonga served faithfully until the late 1990s, when it was replaced by the lighter Mahindra and Mahindra MM550. Auctioned ex-Army Jongas, stretched and converted to people carriers, still serve in some rural areas of India.

== Third generation (160; 1980) ==
Third generation
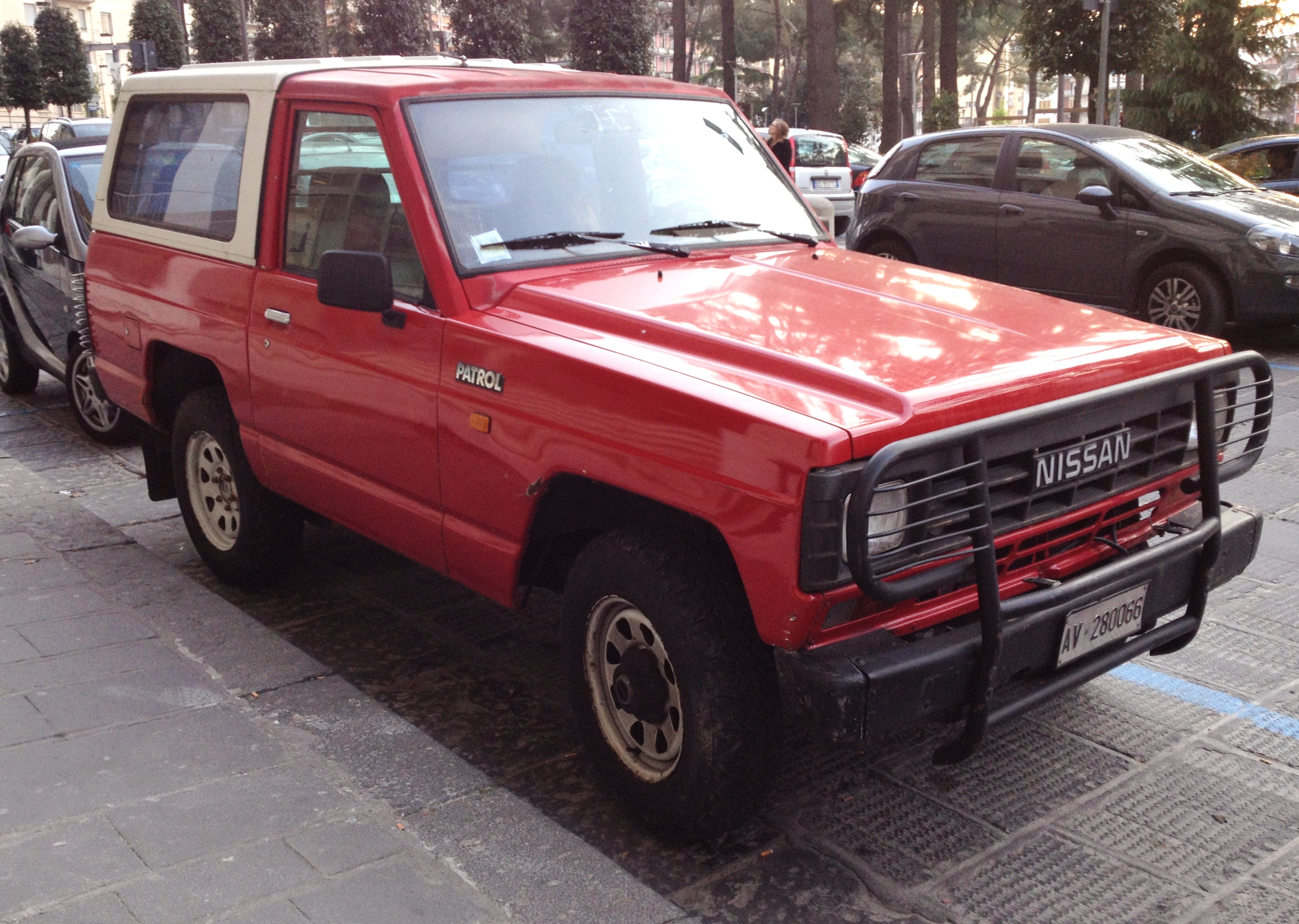

Overview
- Model code: 160
- Also called: Datsun Patrol (1980–1986); Ebro Patrol; Nissan Safari (Japan)
- Production: 1980–1989
- Assembly: Japan: Hiratsuka; Kanda; Zama (1980–1987); Iran: Tehran (Pars Khodro; 1984–2003); Philippines: Makati (1983–1990); Spain: Barcelona (1983–1988); South Africa: Rosslyn (1983–1991)

Body and chassis
- Body style: 3-door hardtop; 3-door softtop; 5-door wagon/van; 2/4-door pickup; fire truck
- Layout: Front-engine, rear-wheel-drive; Front-engine, four-wheel-drive

Powertrain
- Engine: Petrol: 2.4 L Z24 I4; 2.8 L L28/L28E I6; 4.0 L P40 I6; Diesel: 2.7 L Perkins MD27 I4 (Spain); 2.8 L A428/A428II I4 (Spain); 2.8 L A428T turbo I4 (Spain); 3.2 L SD33 I6; 3.3 L SD33T turbo I6
- Transmission: 4/5-speed manual; 3-speed 3N71 automatic

Dimensions
- Wheelbase: SWB: 2,350 mm (92.5 in); LWB: 2,970 mm (116.9 in)
- Length: SWB: 4,105 mm (161.6 in); LWB: 4,690 mm (184.6 in)
- Width: 1,690 mm (66.5 in)
- Height: SWB: 1,840 mm (72.4 in); LWB: 1,805 mm (71.1 in)

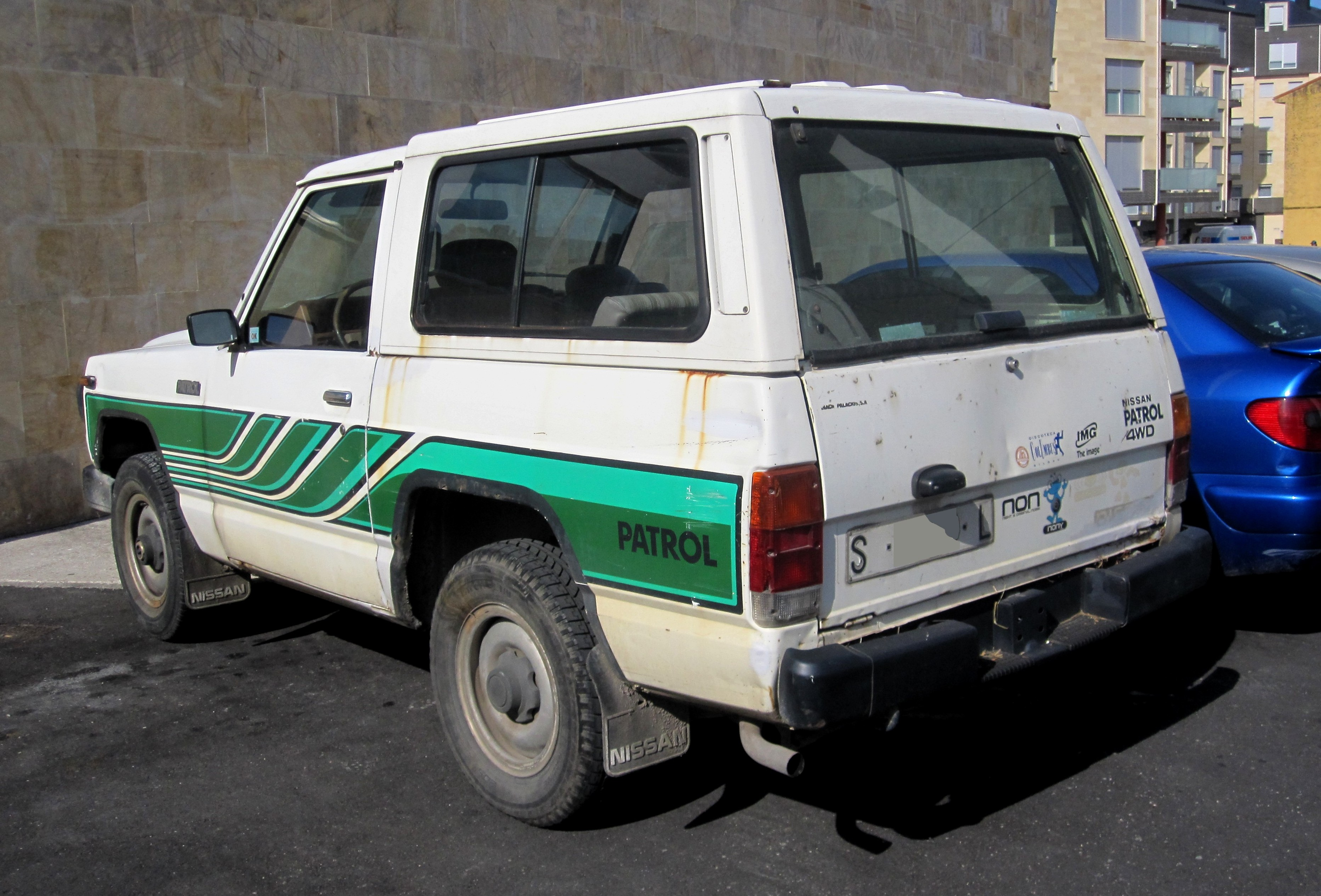
Nissan Patrol (Spain)

The 160 series was introduced in 1980 to replace the 60 series. In Australia and New Zealand, these are sold as the MQ Patrol. In 1980, the available engines were the L28, P40, and SD33. All models were available with a four-speed manual transmission, while a three-speed automatic was optional on long-wheelbase vehicles fitted with the L28 engine. All 160 series Patrols came with a two-speed offset transfer case, which featured a 1:1 high gear and a low gear.

All models had leaf-spring suspension. The SD33 vehicles feature 24-volt electronics. Different trim options and colours were available, with options including vinyl or carpet floors and blue or brown interior trim. Air conditioning and power steering were available on deluxe models.

The front differential in all models was C200. In Australia, the standard rear differential was the H233. Some versions featured limited-slip differentials. A heavy-duty model rear differential was used in some pickup trucks and P40-engined wagons. This was the H260 model differential. In European markets, where less onerous off-road use was expected, the light-duty C200 rear differential was installed in some vehicles.

In 1983, the 160 series was updated and became the 161. In Australasia, the model code went from MQ to MK, but this does not appear on any Nissan literature or service manuals and Nissan parts dealers do not recognise these initials. Updates included a revised front end with rectangular headlights and an upgraded front suspension. The four-speed gearbox was revised and a fifth gear was added for most models. The four-speed was still used in some lower specified units, presumably to run out stock. A high roof ("Super Roof") version of the wagon was added at the same time along with the SD33T turbo-diesel option. With 110 PS (81 kW), the turbodiesel can reach 145 km/h (90 mph).

The naturally aspirated SD33 diesel engine was also updated at this time. Revisions included the use of three piston rings instead of five, piston oil squirters, and a spin-on oil filter instead of a paper cartridge type. In Australia and some other parts of the world, the SD33T-engined Patrols were revised to standard 12-volt electronics. To accommodate the turbodiesel's extra power, these models featured a larger clutch (270 versus 240 mm) and larger oil cooler (five rows versus three) than the naturally aspirated version.

These were the last Patrols to carry the Datsun brand; in line with the rest of the Nissan lineup, the Patrol lost its Datsun branding in 1984 in most markets.

=== Nissan Safari ===
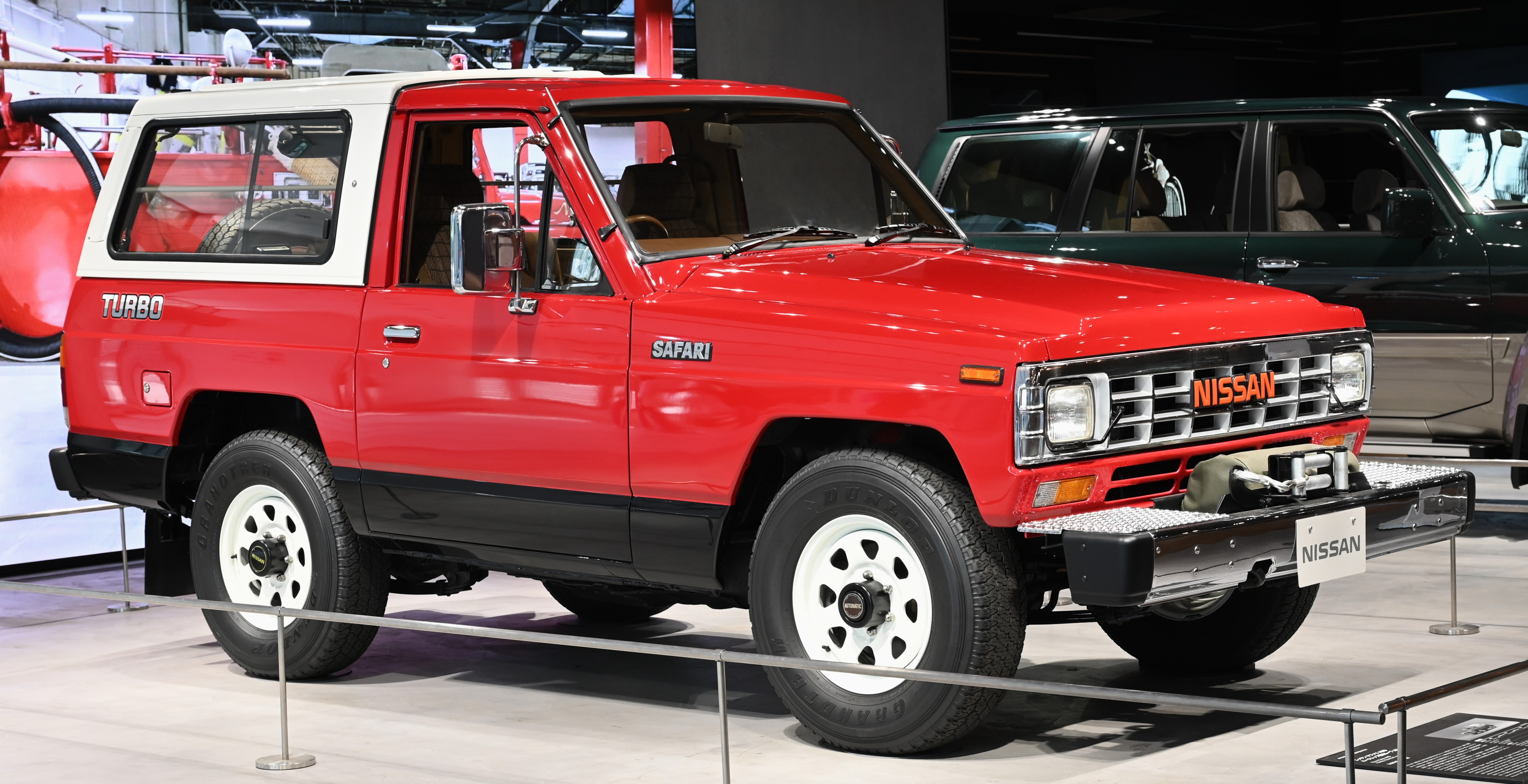
1985 Nissan Safari Hardtop 4WD AD

In 1981, Nissan announced that the Patrol would be renamed Safari in the Japanese market. A new version of its traditional rival, the Toyota Land Cruiser, and new competitors Isuzu Bighorn and Mitsubishi Pajero were also released in the same year.

The first-generation 160 series debuted in June 1980. It was available as a long-wheelbase "Extra Van" with double rear doors, a two-door, short-wheelbase two-seater "Hardtop", and in a "High Roof Hardtop", four-seater version. There were also single or double-cab chassis for fire truck applications.

In the Japanese market, engines available were the inline-six, OHV, 3,246 cc SD33 diesel engine with 95 PS (70 kW) and the 3,956 cc PF40 gasoline engine (for fire engines).

In August 1982 a minor change was made; the NISSAN logo was moved to the center of the front grille. In September 1983, the model underwent some improvements. As on export models, The headlights were changed to rectangular units (except for the fire-fighting cab chassis). The transmission was upgraded to a 5-speed and diesel vehicles were made compliant with the 1982 exhaust gas regulations. At the same time, a vehicle equipped with an SD33T turbo diesel engine with power increased to 120 PS (88 kW) and a high roof with an increased overall height of 140 mm were added to the Extra Van. Accordingly, the model code was changed to the 161 series.

Production of much of the range ended in 1987 with the introduction of the next generation, but the fire truck cab-chassis for the Japanese market, the cab-equipped chassis for the overseas market, and the pickup trucks continued to be produced until 1994.

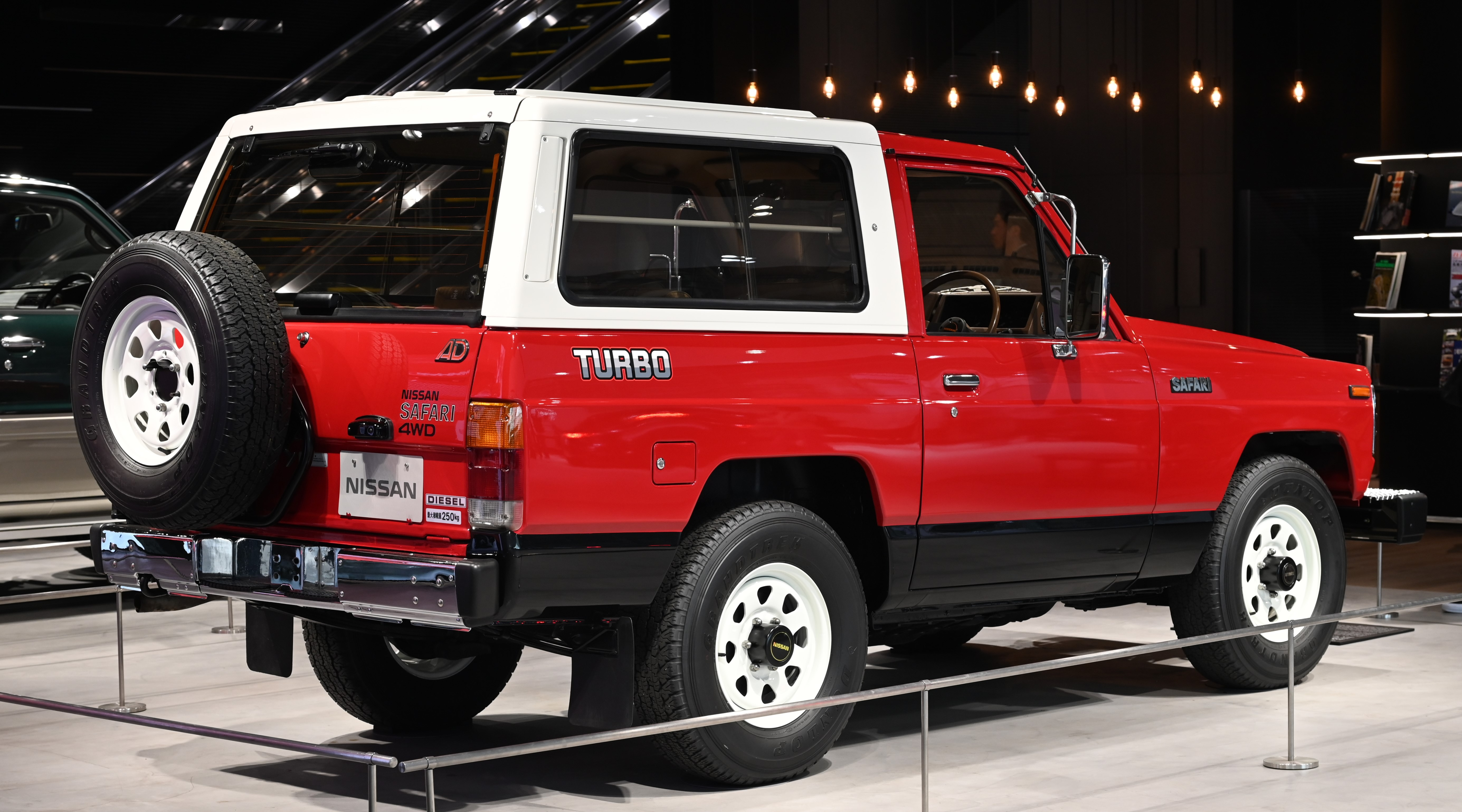
Rear view

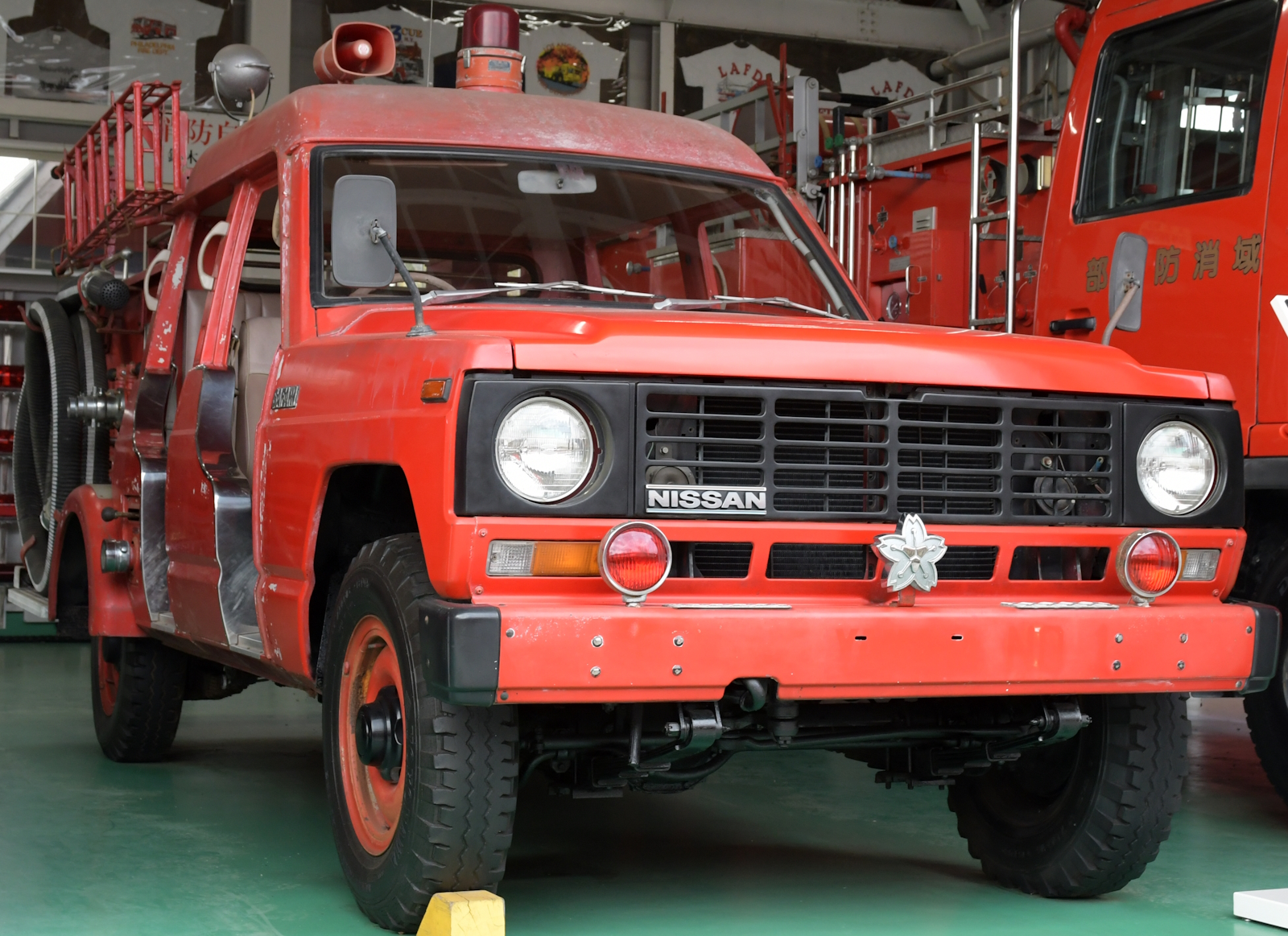
Fire truck（FG160）

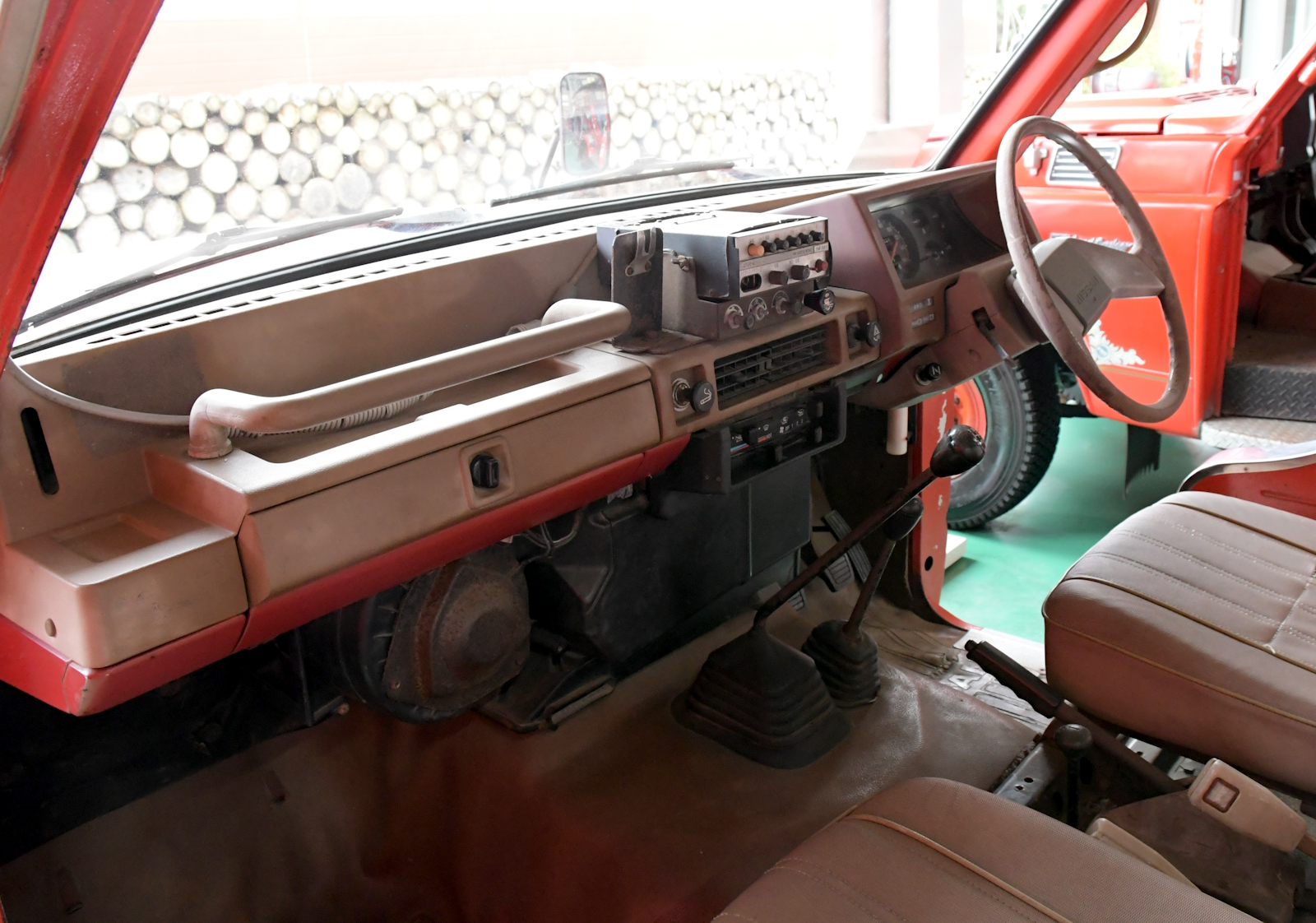
Fire truck interior (FG160）

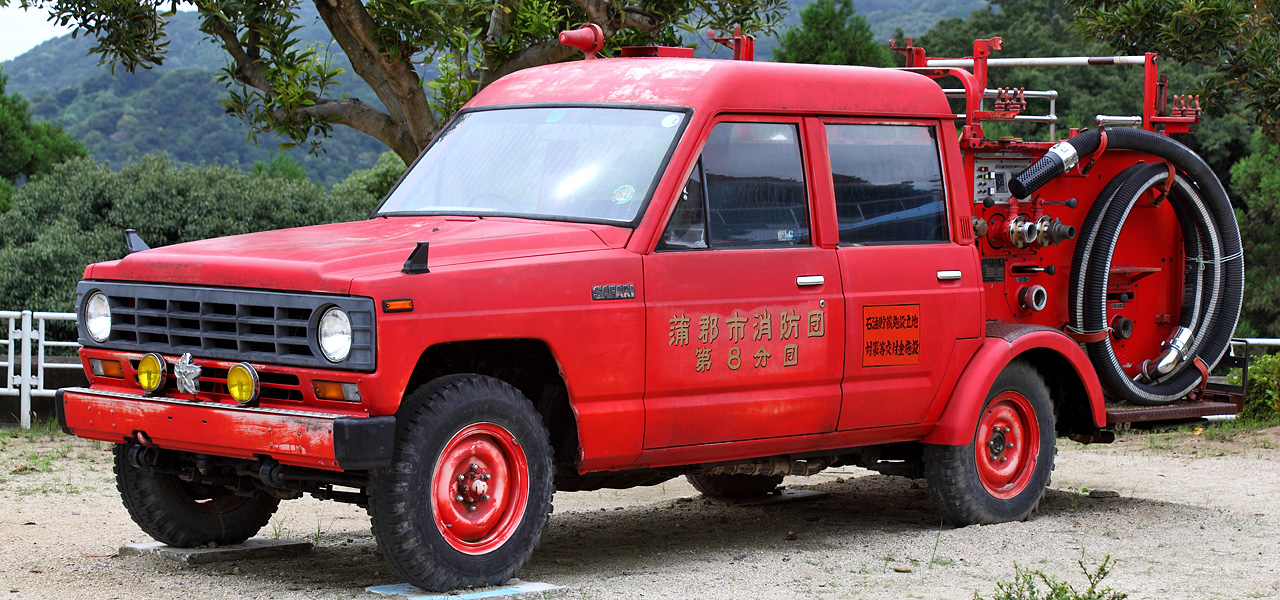
Fire truck (FG161)

=== Spanish production ===
Nissan acquired a 35.85% stake in Motor Ibérica in 1980, which was increased to 54.68% in 1982. In early 1983, the first Spanish-made Nissan Patrol left the plant in Zona Franca, near Barcelona. The first year's production, planned to be 4,000 to 5,000 cars, was earmarked for Spain and Portugal. Exports were to follow during 1984. Nissan Ibérica-built Patrols originally received a Spanish-made Perkins MD27 four-cylinder diesel engine and Spanish transmission to meet local content regulations. Later on, this was replaced by the Nissan-built A428 (also referred to as the A4.28), which was a version of the Perkins MD27 bored out by 2 mm (0.08 in) for a 2.8 L (2,820 cc) displacement. The A428 evolved into the turbocharged A428T and then the A428II. Later yet, the six-cylinder RD28 and the RD28T replaced the old Perkins derivatives in Spanish-made cars.

=== 260 (1986) ===
Third generation
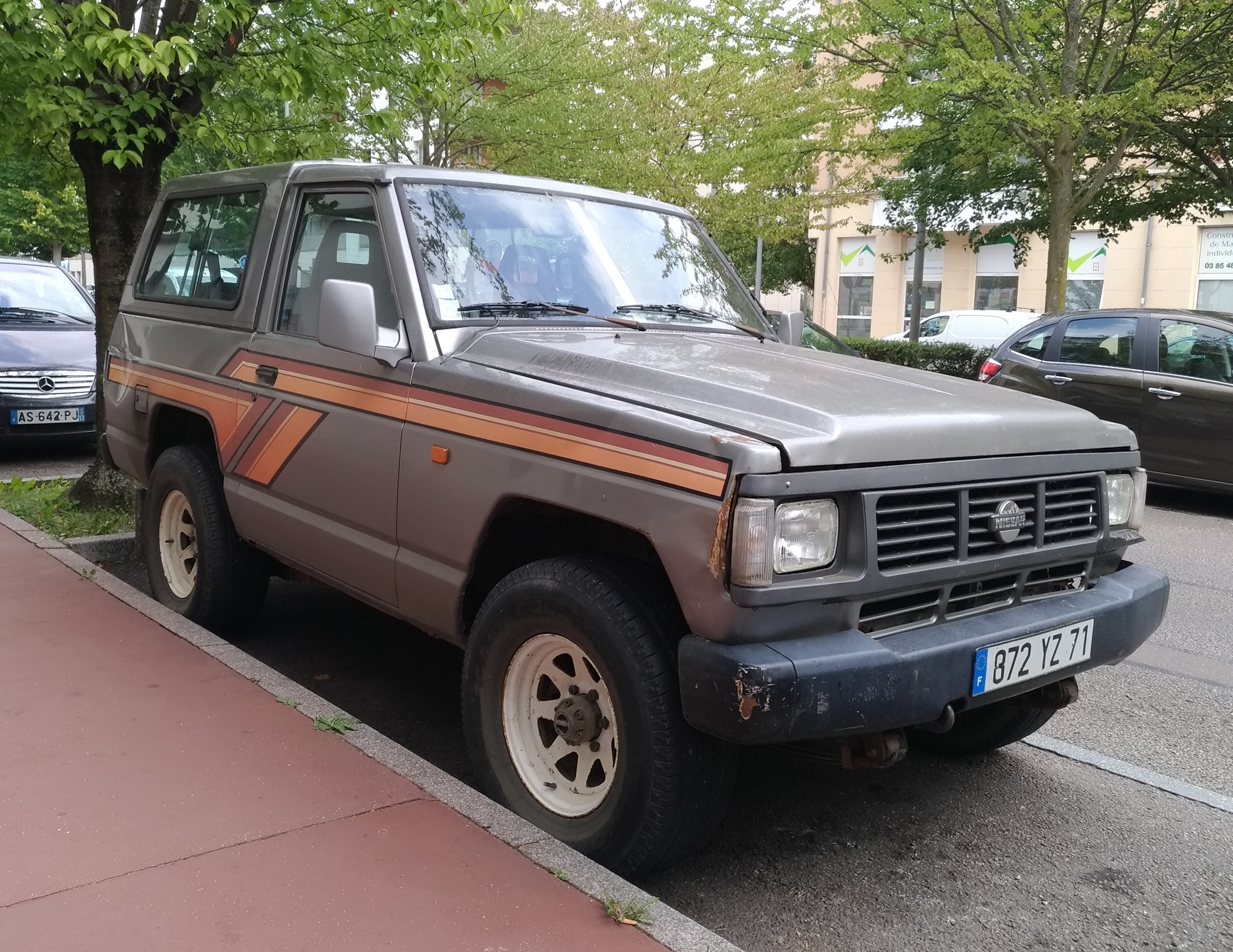

Overview
- Model code: 260
- Also called: Ebro Patrol (Spain, 1986–1993); Sanxing Desert King (China)
- Production: 1986–2002
- Assembly: Spain: Barcelona

Body and chassis
- Class: Full-size off-road vehicle
- Body style: 3-door hardtop; 5-door wagon/van; 2/4-door pickup
- Layout: Front-engine, rear-wheel drive; Front-engine, four-wheel drive

Powertrain
- Engine: Petrol: 2.4 L Z24 I4; 2.8 L L28 I6; Diesel: 2.8 L RD28 I6; 2.8 L RD28T turbo I6; 3.3 L SD33 I6; 3.3 L SD33T turbo I6
- Transmission: 5-speed manual

Dimensions
- Wheelbase: SWB: 2,350 mm (92.5 in); LWB: 2,970 mm (116.9 in)
- Length: SWB: 4,150 mm (163.4 in); LWB: 4,770 mm (187.8 in)
- Width: 1,690 mm (66.5 in)
- Height: SWB: 1,840 mm (72.4 in); LWB: 1,805 mm (71.1 in)

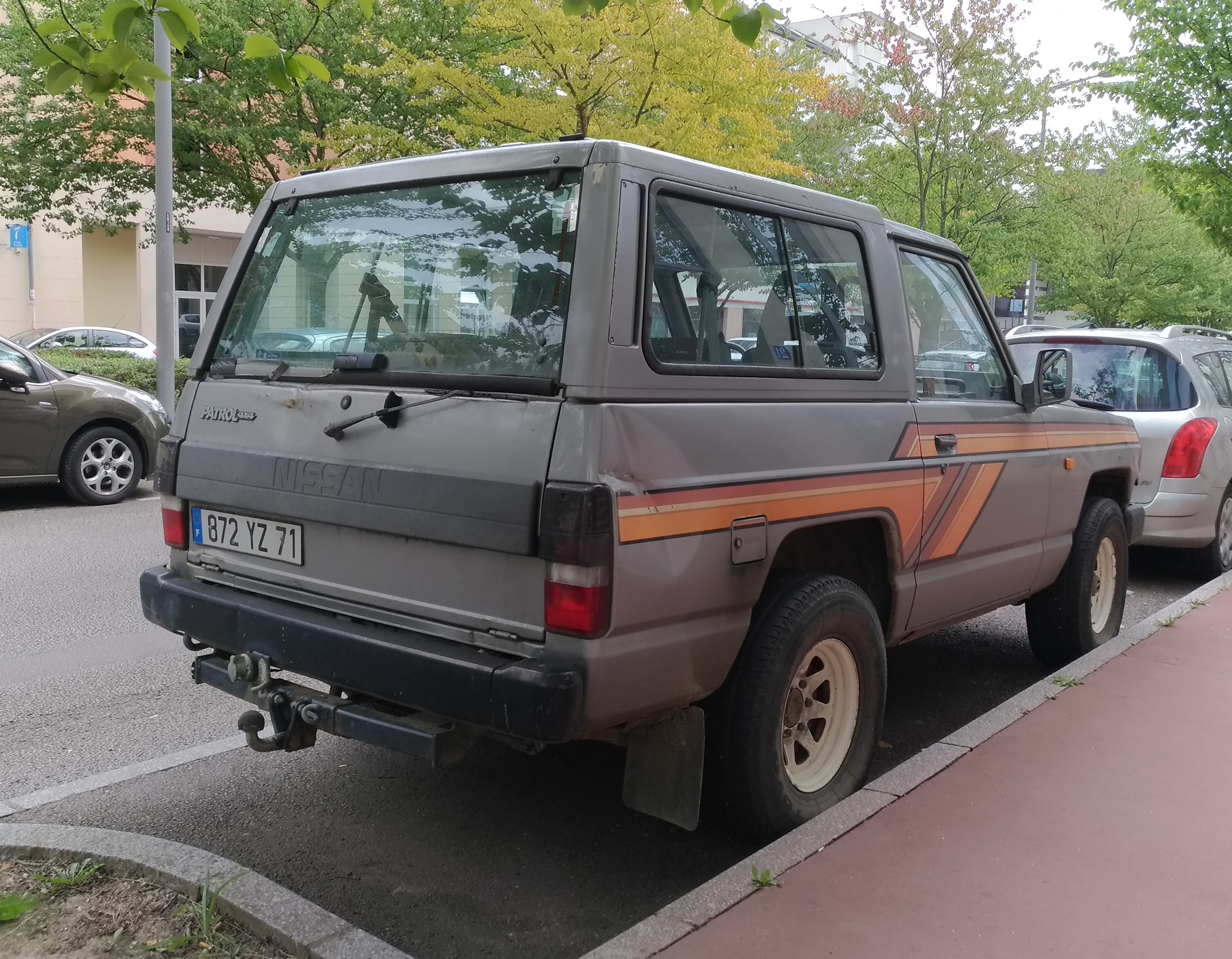
Rear view

The 260 series was a facelifted version of the Spanish-built 160 (easily spotted by the rectangular headlamps) sold in Europe and available in SWB and LWB with L28, SD33, RD28 and RD28T engines. The SD-engined version had a 24-volt electrical system. Nissan helped Nissan Ibérica amortize plant investments. The 260 Patrol later received a facelift with a new grille similar to that of the Y60 series which succeeded this generation elsewhere. Spanish production continued until 1994 for export and until 2002 for the Spanish market.

== Fourth generation (Y60; 1987) ==
Fourth generation
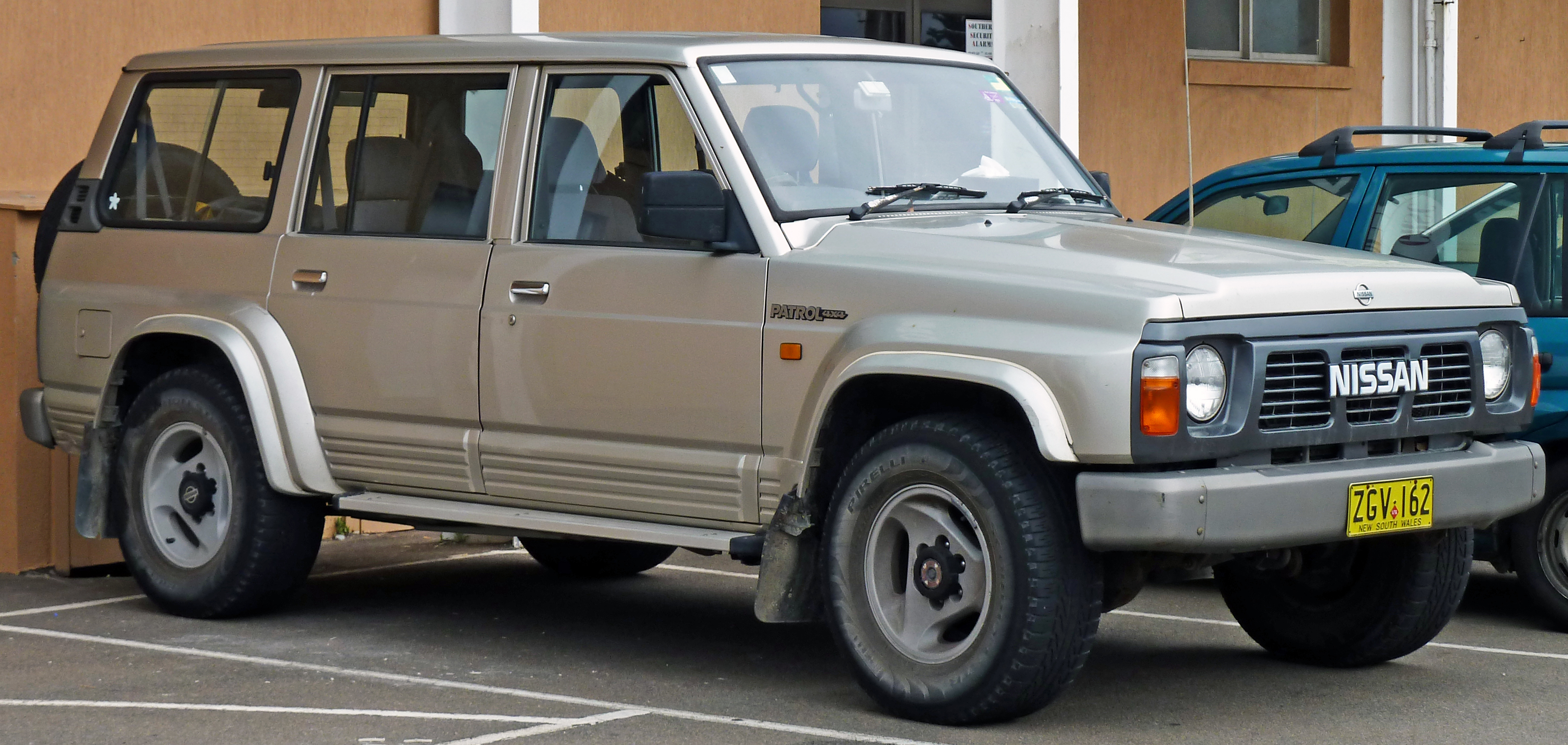

Overview
- Model code: Y60
- Also called: Nissan Safari (Japan); Ford Maverick (Australia); Yunbao YB2030 (China, JV)
- Production: 1987–1997 (Safari); 1989–1998 (Patrol)
- Assembly: Japan: Hiratsuka (1987–2001); Spain: Barcelona (1988–1998)

Body and chassis
- Class: Full-size off road vehicle
- Body style: 3-door wagon; 5-door wagon/van; 2-door cab-chassis; 2-door pickup truck
- Layout: Front-engine, rear-wheel-drive; Front-engine, four-wheel-drive

Powertrain
- Engine: Petrol: 3.0 L RB30S I6; 4.2 L TB42S/TB42E I6; Diesel: 2.8 L RD28T I6 turbo; 4.2 L TD42 I6; 4.2 L TD42T/Ti Turbo I6
- Transmission: 4-speed RE4R03A automatic; 5-speed FS5R50A manual

Dimensions
- Wheelbase: SWB: 2,400 mm (94.5 in); LWB: 2,970 mm (116.9 in)
- Length: SWB: 4,340 mm (170.9 in); LWB: 4,810 mm (189.4 in)
- Width: SWB: 1,800 mm (70.9 in); LWB: 1,930 mm (76.0 in); Pickup: 1,690 mm (66.5 in)
- Height: 1,820 mm (71.7 in) (low roof); 1,995 mm (78.5 in) (high roof)

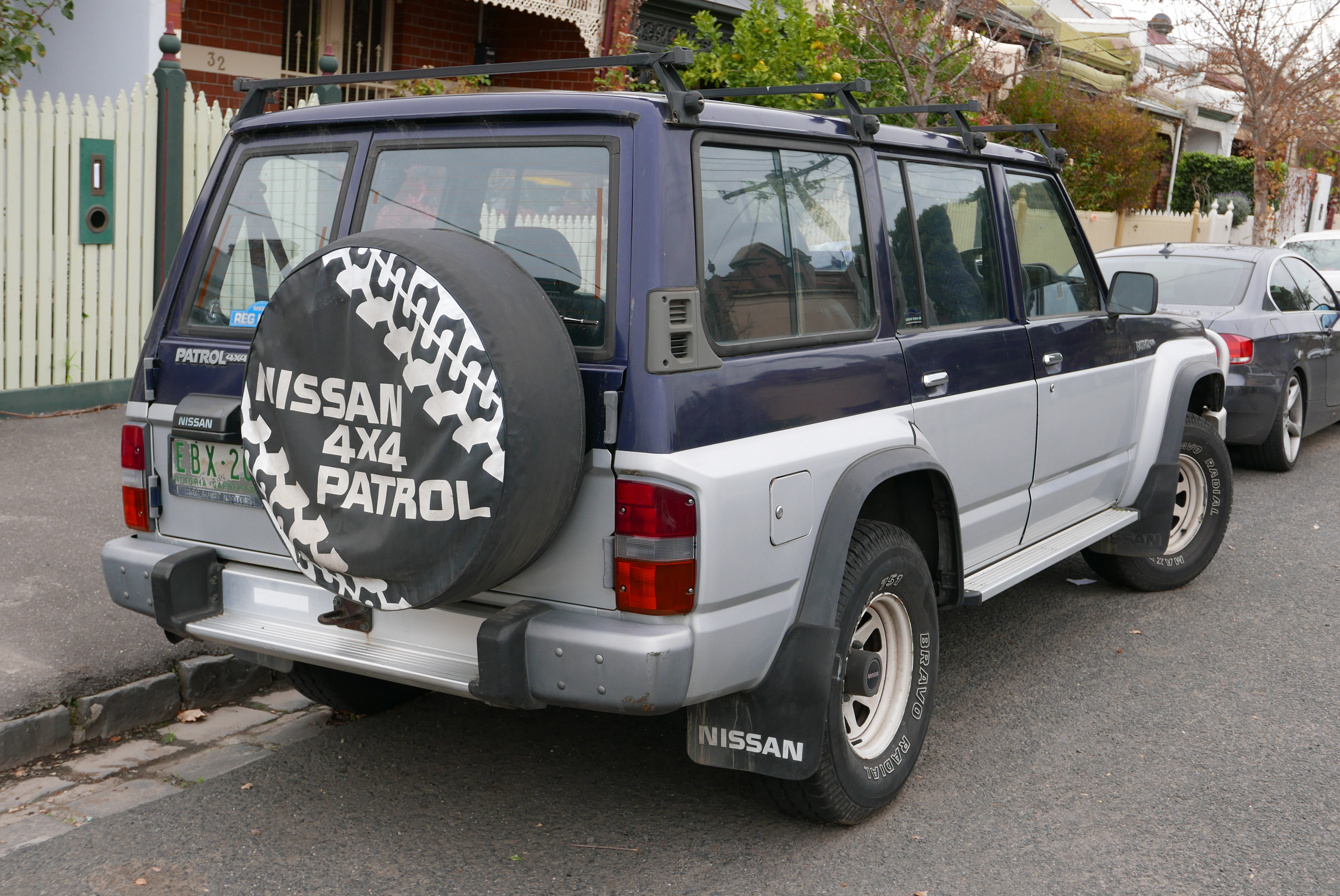
Pre-facelift Nissan Patrol ST

The Y60 was radically different mechanically from its predecessors, as it was the first Patrol with coil-spring suspension, increasing comfort and improving rough-ground handling. All Y60 Patrols had a three-link live axle suspension set-up at the front, with all wagons (SWB, LWB, and SWB LW) adopting a five-link set-up at the rear. The utility model was available with both a leaf-spring rear axle, and from 1994 onwards, a choice of the same coil-spring rear axle as the wagons. Sway bars were included on both front and rear coil-spring live axles. Power steering was standard. Some wagon models had front and rear disc brakes, while the utility retained rear drum brakes. The introduction of a synchromesh on reverse gear was another improvement.

The alternative model codes of GR and GQ were applied to right-hand and left-hand drive models, respectively.

Most models had a rear limited-slip differential and some variants had a vacuum or electric solenoid-operated manual rear differential lock. A rear sway bar release mechanism appeared on some models. Some Y60s had a power take-off-driven front-mounted winch, with an in-cab control lever to the right of the gearstick.

The Patrol was also branded as Safari in Japan, depending on which Japanese dealership was offering it – Safari at Nissan Prince Shop and Patrol at Nissan Bluebird Shop. The Safari was available with an optional 24V electrical system, instead of the standard 12V. This was the first series that placed the exterior dimensions in the higher tax bracket for the wider exterior measurement as defined in Japanese Government dimension regulations and the larger engines added a higher road tax obligation for Japanese owners.

Initially, the TD42 and TB42 were available with a five-speed manual, the four-speed automatic was added in 1988. The RD28T and the RB30 offered only a five-speed manual.

In Japan, the 7-seater Safari was added in 1991. It was only offered in 5-speed manual. The TB42E which had previously been used in export models, was introduced to the Japan. The TD42 type was replaced with the turbocharged TD42-T type.

Trim levels in Australia included:

- DX with manual mirrors, no central locking, vinyl interior, optional AC, manual locking hubs
- RX (from 1995) with electric mirrors, central locking, carpet interior, AC, manual locking hubs
- ST with electric windows, electric mirrors, central locking, carpet interior, AC, automatic locking hubs
- Ti (from late 1989) was equipped with an electronic fuel-injected engine, electric windows, electric mirrors, central locking, velour and carpet interior, rear AC, seven-speaker sound system, alloy three-spoke wheels, and automatic locking hubs. It had a high roof design with sunroof until 1991. Leather and woodgrain trim was made standard in 1992 with the Series 2.

Several dealer-fitted accessories were available, including sunroofs, roof racks, tow bars, driving lights, cargo barriers, and side steps. The TD42 was available with an optional Safari turbocharger at some Australian dealers.

Trim levels in Europe varied by country. These include designations such as SLX, LX, LW, and many others in France. Finnish Patrols came standard with two batteries. LW (1996–1997) featured a lightweight body, reducing the weight by 50 kg (110 lb) and a special smaller body (40 mm [1.6 in]). These were produced only for extreme off-road championships. The engine and chassis remained the same.

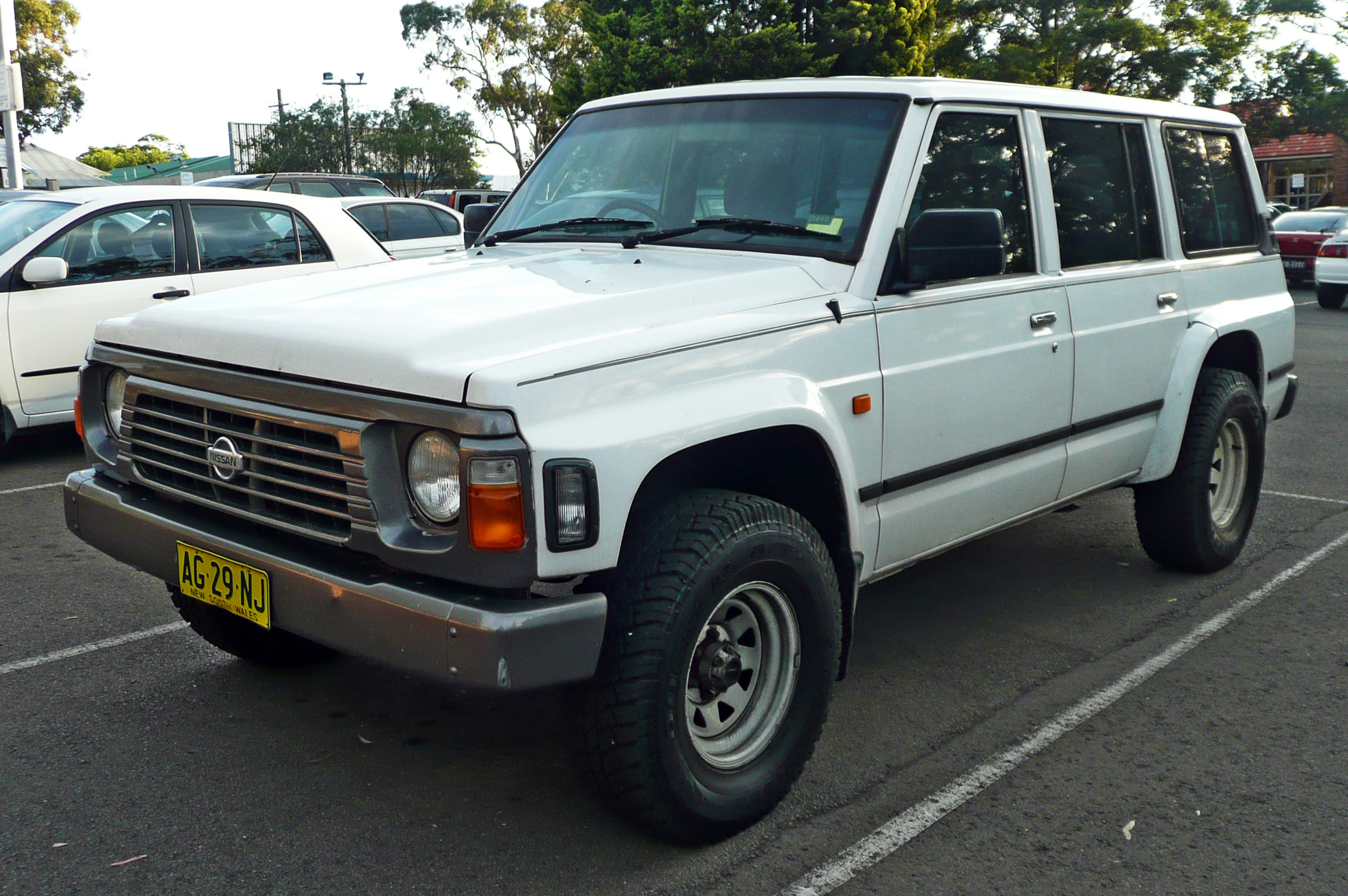

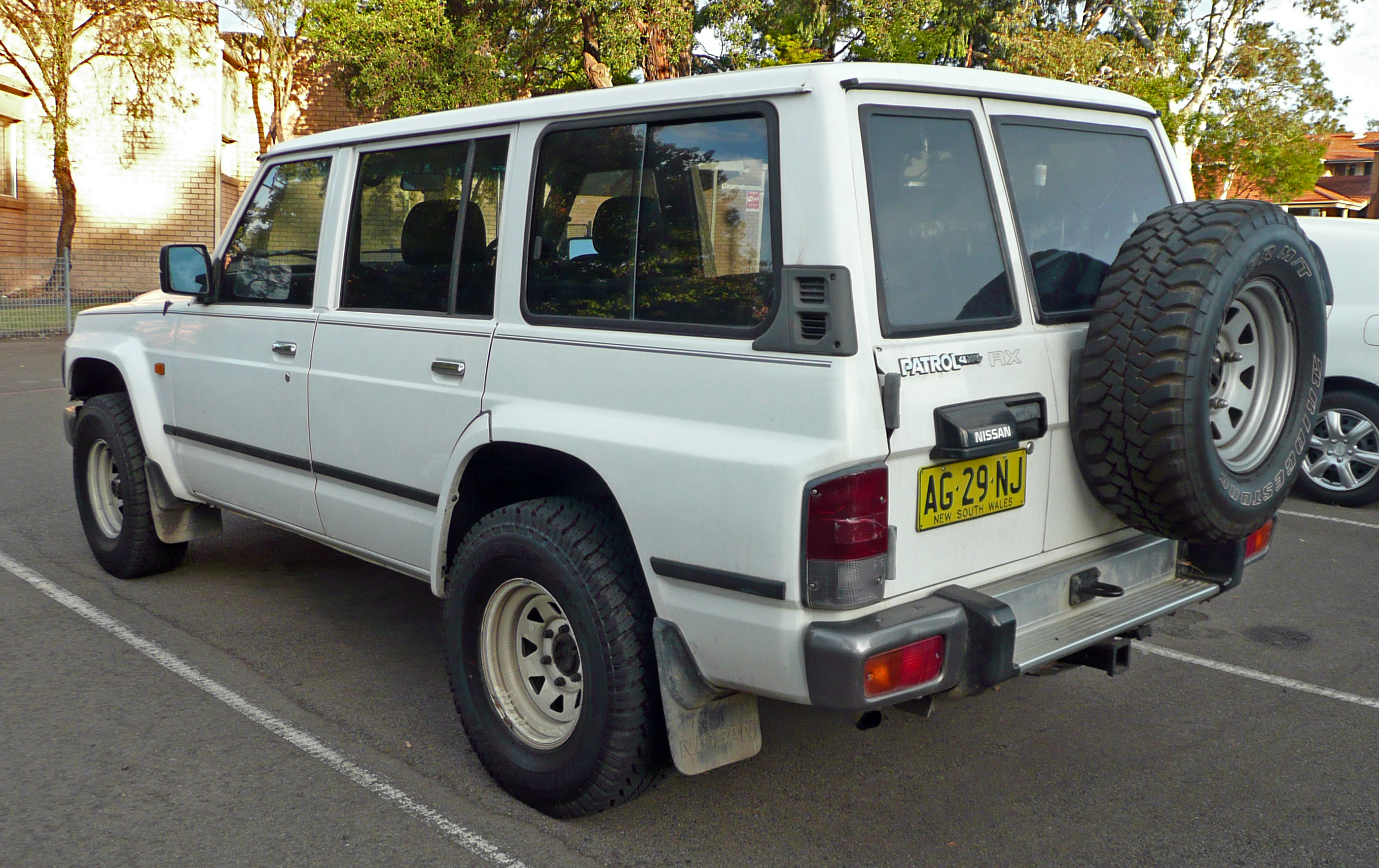
1995–1997 Nissan Patrol (GQ II) RX wagon (Australia)

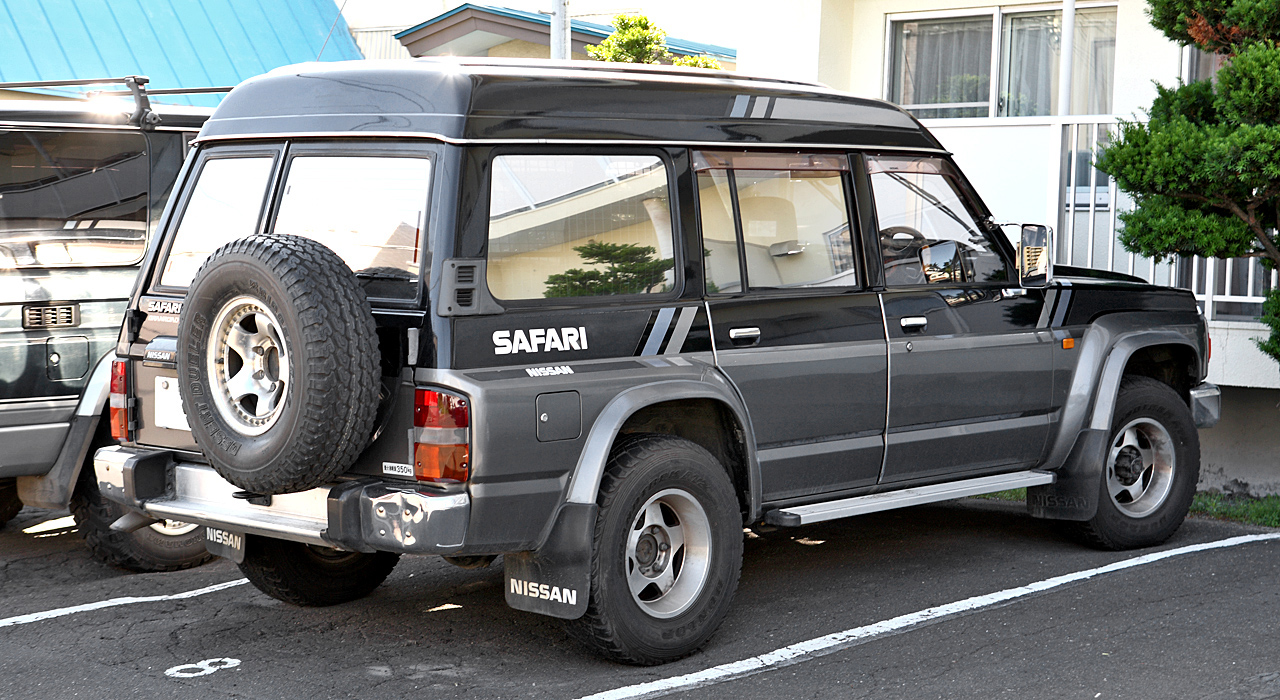
High roof version

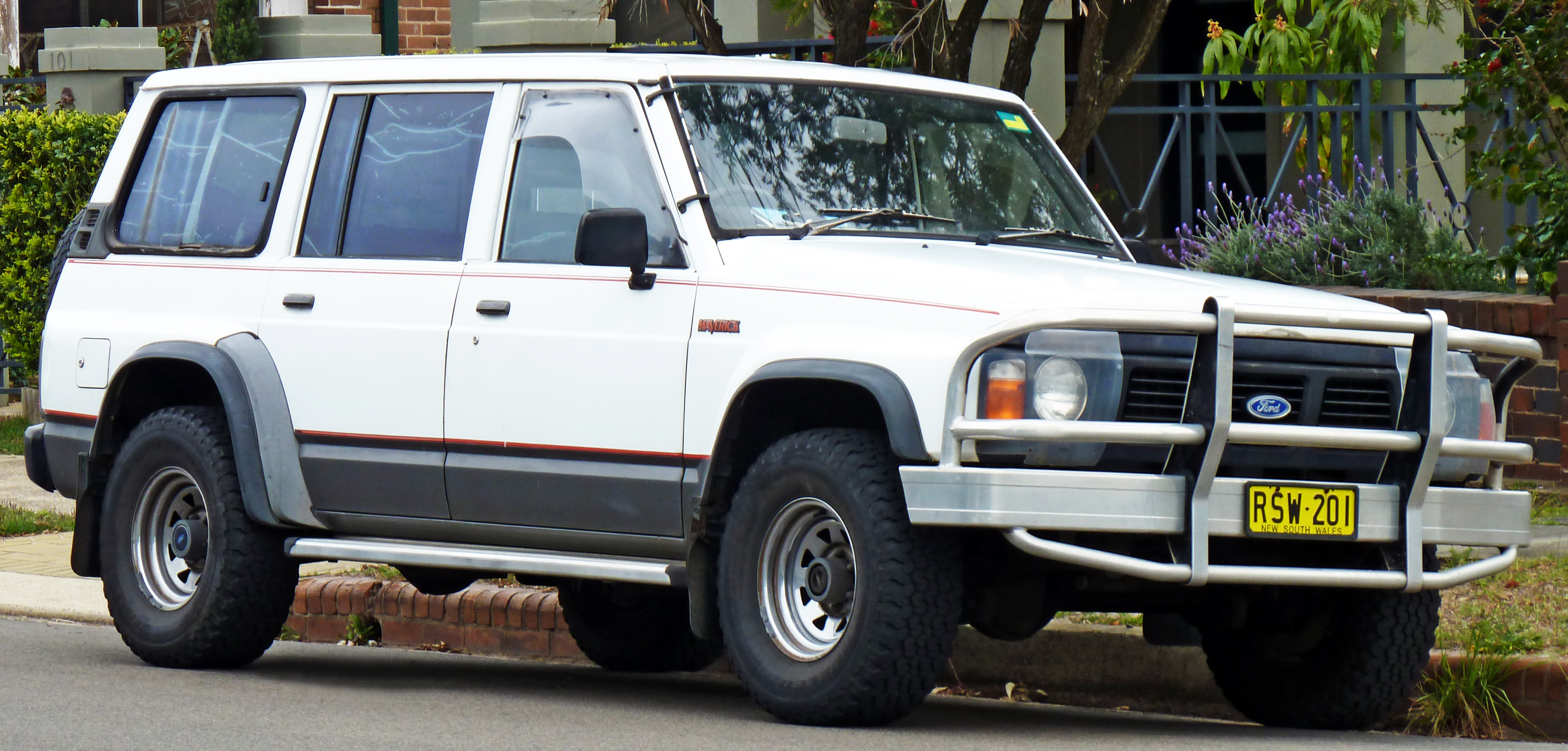
Ford Maverick wagon (Australia)

Two major updates came in Australia, one in 1992 (GQ Series 2), and one in 1995 (minor facelift). The most notable changes in 1992 were the introduction of fuel-injection on the TB42 motor, EGR valve and oil cooler on the RD28T, new seats, new trim, sound deadening, and side intrusion bars. Other 1992 Series 2 refinements included a revised transmission and suspension, and introducing bigger brakes, bigger wheels, and the standardization of limited-slip differentials and auto-freewheeling hubs. This update included new seats, trim, and side intrusion bars.

In 1991, the rear indicators, tail lights, and brake lights were relocated to the bumper from the body to meet Australian Design Rules, but they remained unchanged in European versions. In 1994, another set of indicators was placed on the front quarter panel.

In August 1993, the TD42 was lightened to reduce fuel consumption and increase maximum engine speed. This had the side effect of weakening the engine. The original engine can be identified by its silver rocker cover, whereas the lightened engine featured a black rocker cover. The RD28T got some extra changes, moving the vacuum pump from behind the alternator to the top of the engine. Driver-side airbags appeared in some European models.

Changes in 1994 featured a minor facelift, with a redesigned front grille and the RX model entering Australia. Known weaknesses included vibrations from the front end (largely fixed under warranty), cracking hinges on the rear door (due to the spare tyre's weight), and rust on rear window frames. The RD28T and TB42 engines suffered from head gasket issues when driven with a heavy foot. European five-speed gearboxes suffered from bearing failures in fifth gear at high mileages. However, the TD42 was highly reliable, as long as it received proper cooling. Patrols are known for their strong axles and good limited-slip differential (when so equipped).

All wagons had a 100-litre main fuel tank with the utility having a 100-litre tank and the option of a 100-litre second tank.

=== Nissan Safari Adieu ===
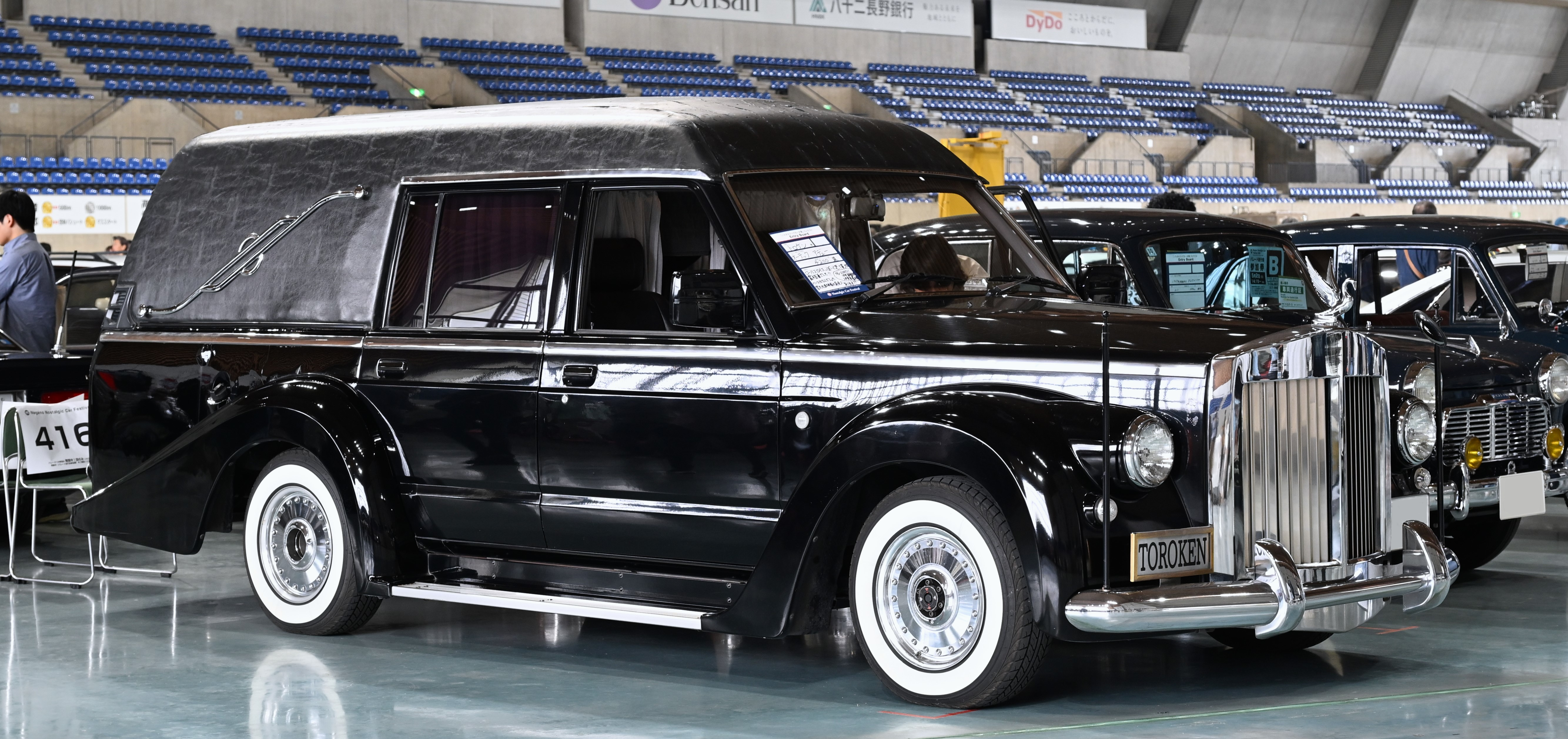

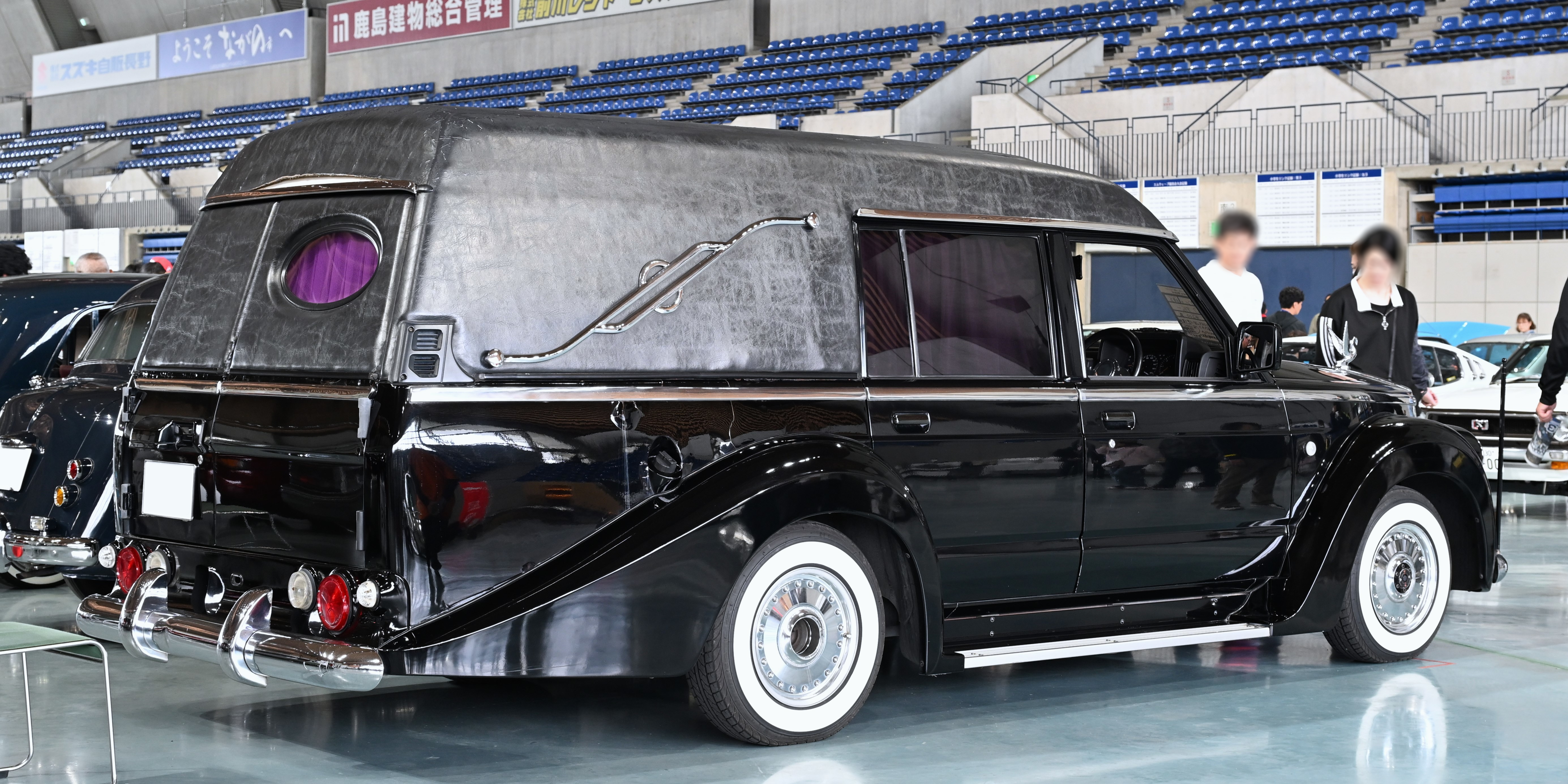
Nissan Safari Autech Adieu

An aftermarket modified version of the Safari, the Autech Adieu, made its debut in 1995 for Japan only, and manufactured by Autech. Based on the high roof Grand Road and King Road, it is equipped with modifications intended for use as a hearse during funeral processions.

=== Engine specifications ===
Engine code	Displacement	Bore x stroke	Power	Torque	Compression ratio	Design	Features
RB30S	2962 cc	86 x 85mm	100 kW (136 PS) at 4800 rpm	224 Nm at 3000 rpm	9.0:1	Inline-six SOHC, petrol	Aluminum crossflow cylinder head
TB42S	4169 cc	96 x 96mm	125 kW (170 PS) at 4200 rpm	325 Nm at 2800 rpm	8.3:1	Inline-six Pushrod, petrol	Crossflow cylinder head, high camshaft
TB42E	4169 cc	96 x 96mm	135 kW (184 PS) at 4400 rpm	320 Nm at 3200 rpm	8.3:1	Inline-six Pushrod, petrol	Crossflow cylinder head, high camshaft
RD28T	2826 cc	85 x 83mm	92 kW (125 PS) at 4400 rpm	255 Nm at 2000 rpm	21.2:1	Inline-six SOHC, diesel	Turbocharged
TD42	4169 cc	96 x 96mm	85 kW (116 PS) at 4000 rpm	264 Nm at 2000 rpm	22.7:1	Inline-six pushrod, diesel	Crossflow cylinder head, high camshaft

== Fifth generation (Y61; 1997) ==
Fifth generation
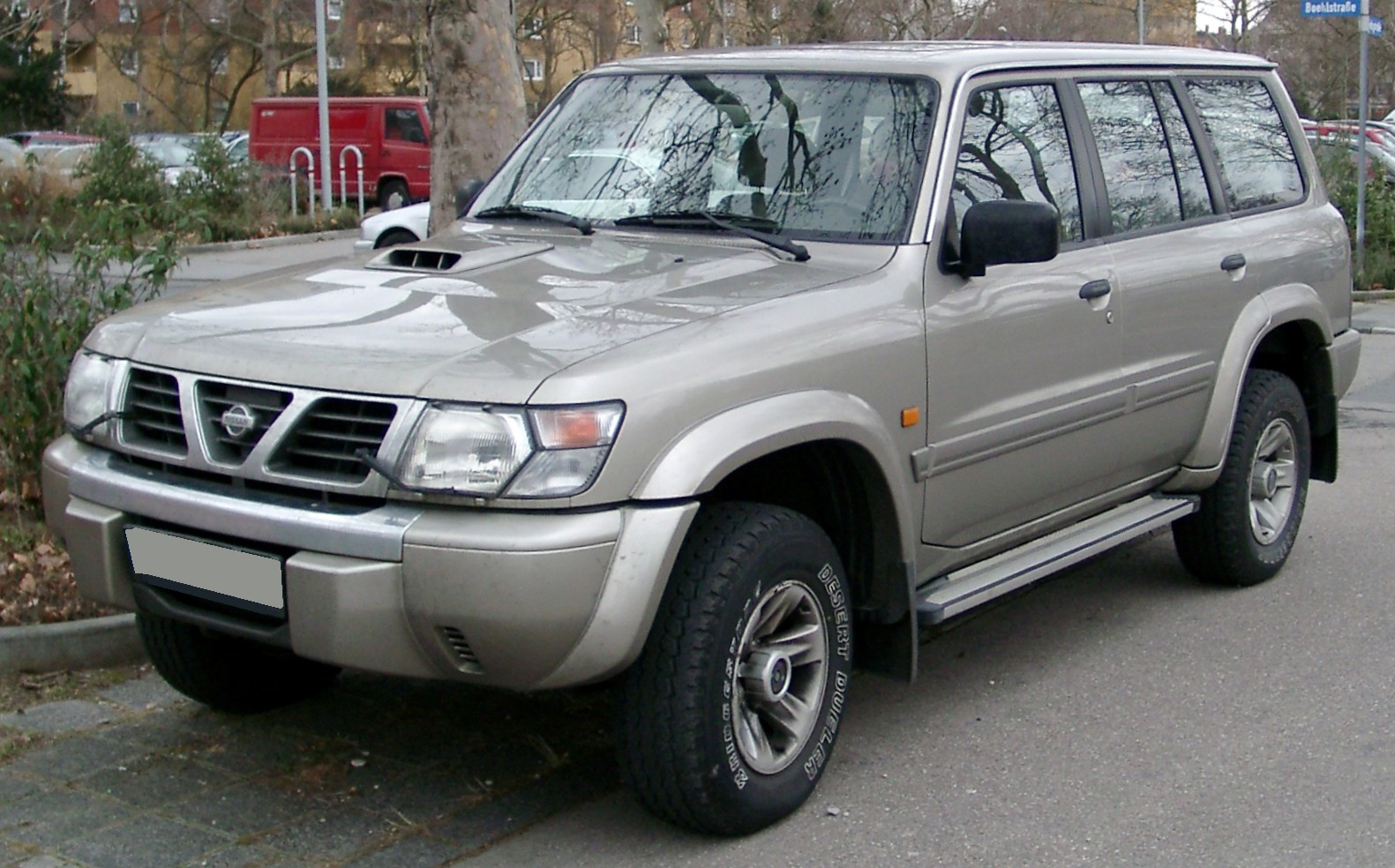

Overview
- Model code: Y61
- Also called: Nissan Safari (Japan)
- Production: October 1997–April 2024
- Assembly: Japan: Nissan Shatai (1997–2024); Kanda; Morocco: Tanger (2009–2024); Pakistan: Karachi (2005–2012); South Africa: Rosslyn (2001–2024); Spain: Barcelona (1998–2009); Philippines: Santa Rosa City (2000–2018)
- Designer: Masato Takahashi (1994); Junichi Sakai (facelift: 2003)

Body and chassis
- Class: Full-size off-road vehicle
- Body style: 3-door wagon; 5-door wagon; 2-door pickup; 4-door pickup
- Layout: Front-engine, rear-wheel drive; Front-engine, four-wheel drive

Powertrain
- Engine: Petrol: 4.2 L TB42S I6; 4.5 L TB45E/TB45S I6; 4.8 L TB48DE I6; Diesel: 2.8 L RD28ETi1 turbo I6; 3.0 L ZD30DDTi turbo I4; 4.2 L TD422 I6; 4.2 L TD42T3 turbo I6
- Transmission: 4-speed RE4R03A automatic; 5-speed RE5R05A automatic (TB48DE only); 5-speed FS5R30A manual; 5-speed FS5R50B manual

Dimensions
- Wheelbase: SWB: 2,400 mm (94.5 in); LWB: 2,970 mm (116.9 in)
- Length: SWB: 4,440 mm (174.8 in); LWB: 4,885–5,050 mm (192.3–198.8 in)
- Width: 1,840–1,930 mm (72.4–76.0 in)
- Height: 1,855 mm (73.0 in)
- Curb weight: 2,473 kg (5,452 lb)

Y61 models first appeared in December 1997, available in 4.5- and 4.8-litre petrol, 2.8-, 3.0-, and 4.2-litre turbo-diesel and 4.2-litre turbo-diesel intercooler variants. The alternative model codes of GR and GU were applied to left- and right-hand drive models, respectively.

The drivetrain was changed in this model, including larger CVs and less synchros in the manual gearboxes. The differential housings were widened to fall inline with the new body shape, but centres remained the same (H233 and H260). Some petrol wagons received a coil version of the H260 differential.

Comfort levels were increased over GQ, especially in the seating and NVH areas.

=== GU IV onwards ===
For the 2005 model year a significant facelift model was released, with new headlights, box flares on each guard and larger tail lights. The troubles that plagued the ZD30 diesel around the variable turbo geometry were resolved by this refresh.

That same year, Nissan stopped selling the Safari in Japan due to poor sales. Nissan also made a two-door pickup version of the Y61 series available as cab chassis and with a style side tray in some markets. The Pickup entered production at the Nissan Shatai plant in April 2011. Although a new generation Patrol/Safari was launched, this Y61 series was kept in production until 2024 for users who required a more rugged, simpler vehicle.

Its TB48DE engine is popular among tuning enthusiasts in the Middle East, particularly in the United Arab Emirates. The engine's robust cast-iron block and aftermarket support have made it a popular platform for turbocharged performance builds, with specialized racing examples producing more than 750 kW (1,000 hp).

As of 2014, Nissan discontinued the fifth generation model worldwide, except for South Africa, the Middle East, Paraguay, Haiti, Philippines, Nepal, Bolivia, Sri Lanka, and some African and Eastern European countries where the 4x4 competed against the Toyota Land Cruiser (J70). In Australia, the Y61 was sold until 2016, alongside the Y62.

Several special edition trims have been also been released in respective regions where the Y61 was and are currently being sold, of which some of them are The Presidential edition and 4XPRO edition (Philippines), The Legend edition (Philippines, South Africa and Australia), The 'Special' Super Safari edition (Middle East), The Falcon edition (Middle East), Gazelle, Gazelle Storm, Gazelle X editions and Al Ostoura (Middle East).

The Y61 was still being produced for and used by United Nations agencies across different countries as well as some military branches and government sectors. They are mainly being used as security escorts vehicles, chief personnel carriers and off pavement patrol units. Production finally ended in 2024, and the model listing has been removed from official Nissan websites as of 2024.

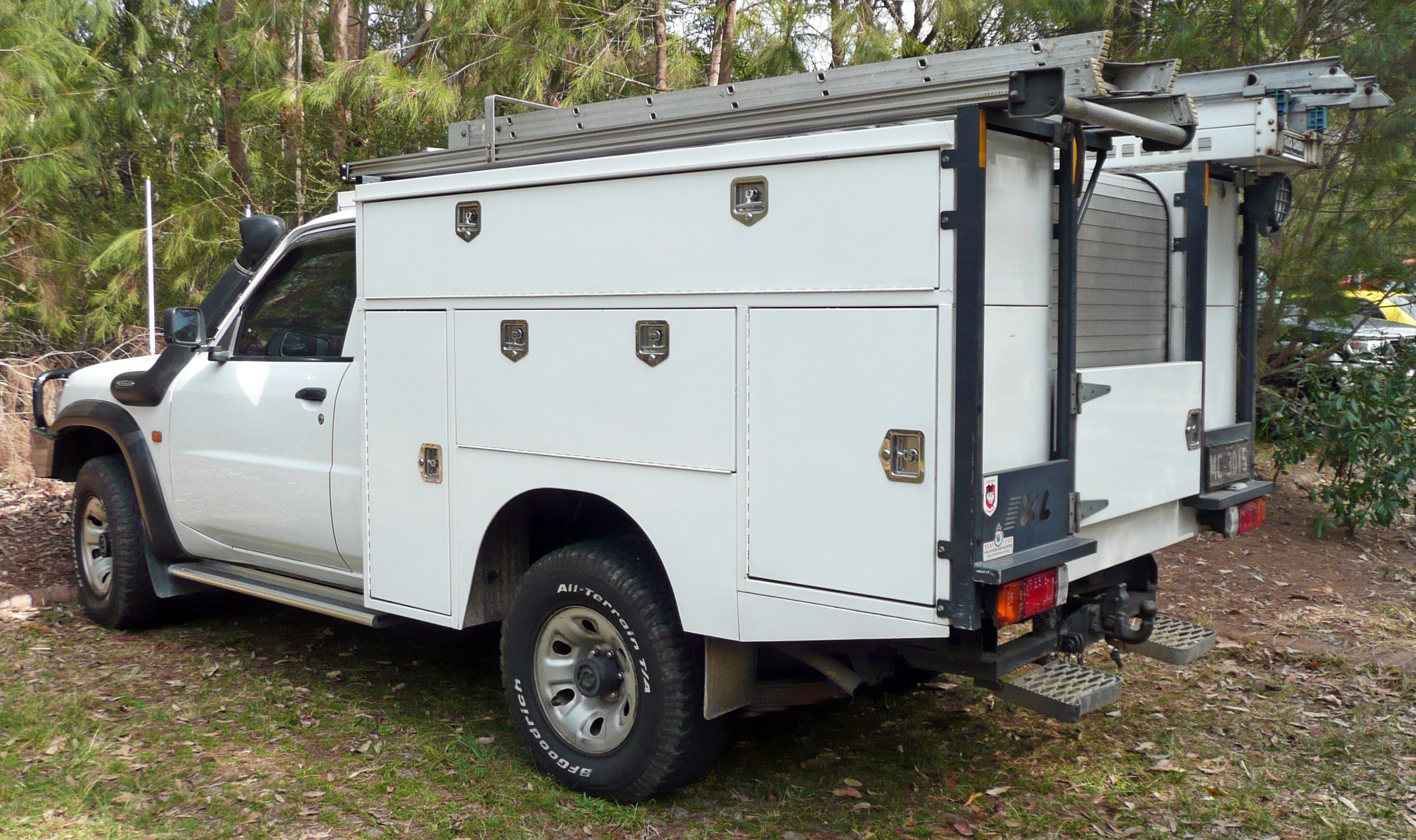
Cab chassis

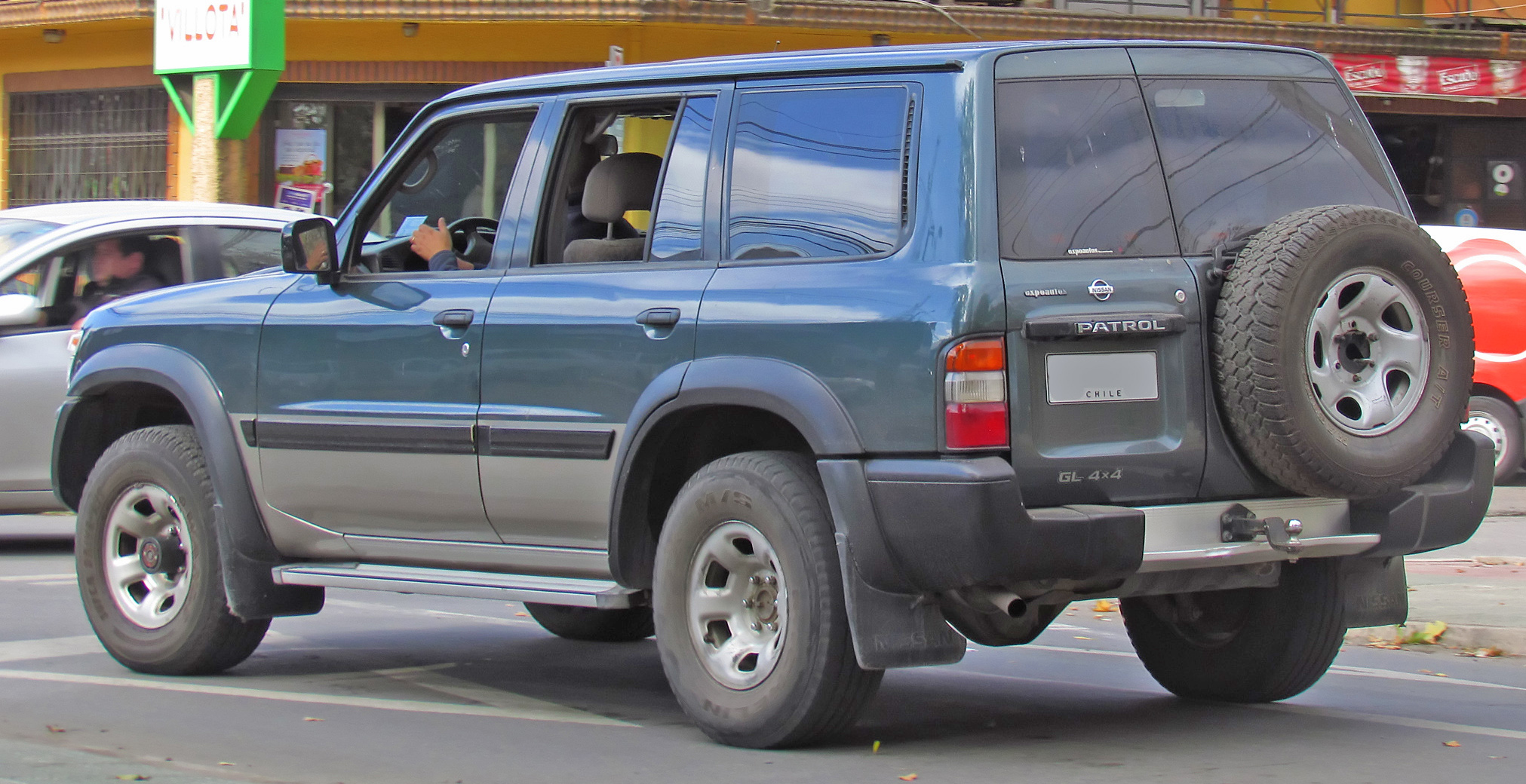
5-door SUV

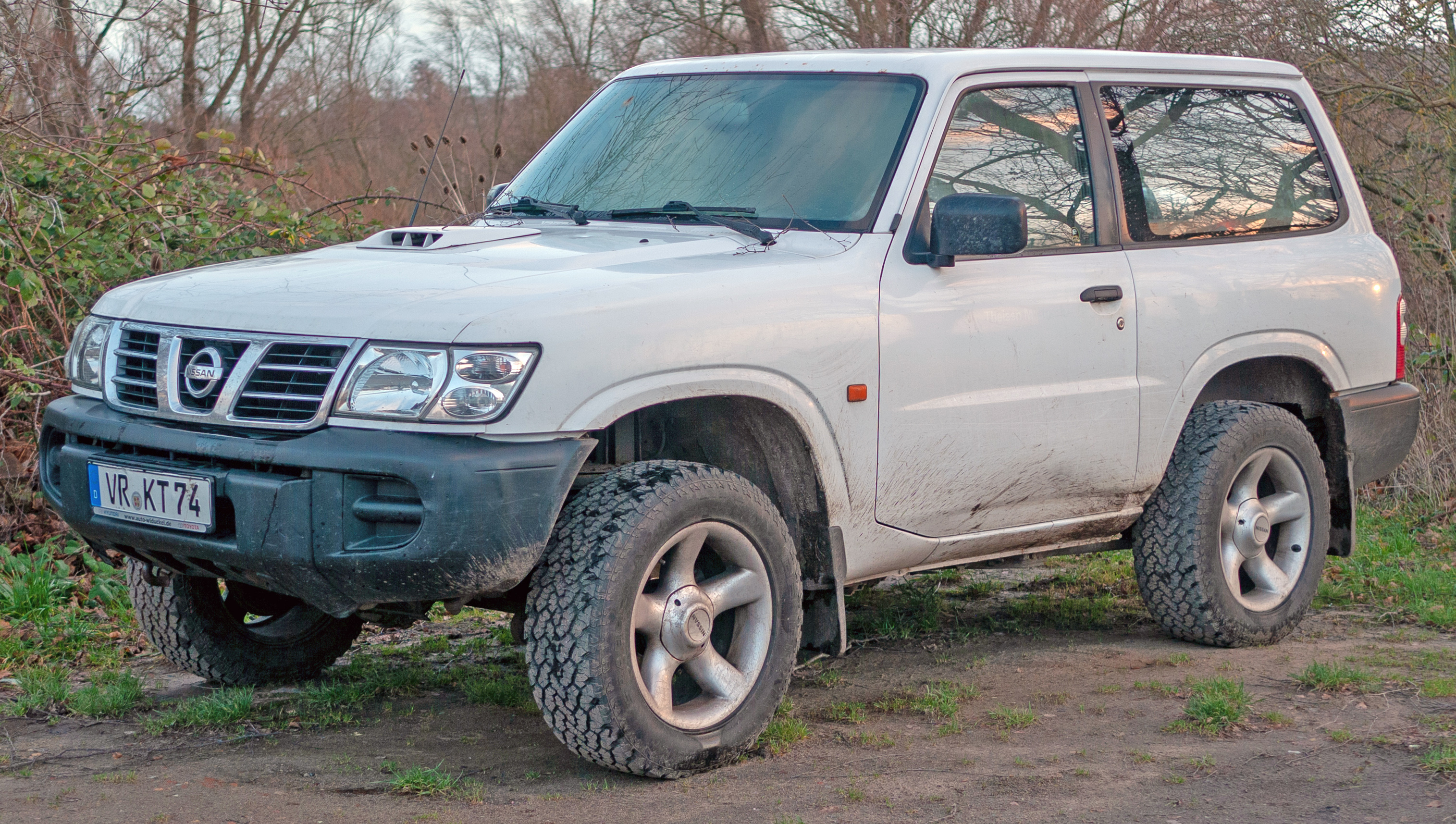
3-door SUV (first facelift)

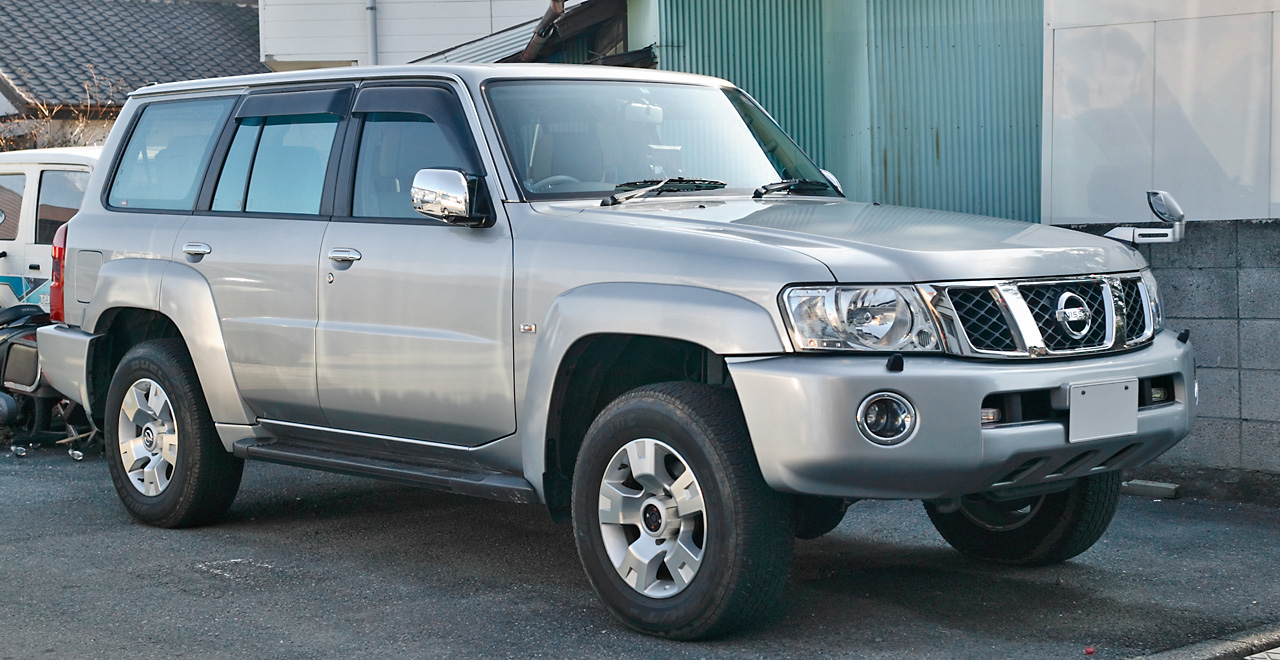
5-door SUV (second facelift)

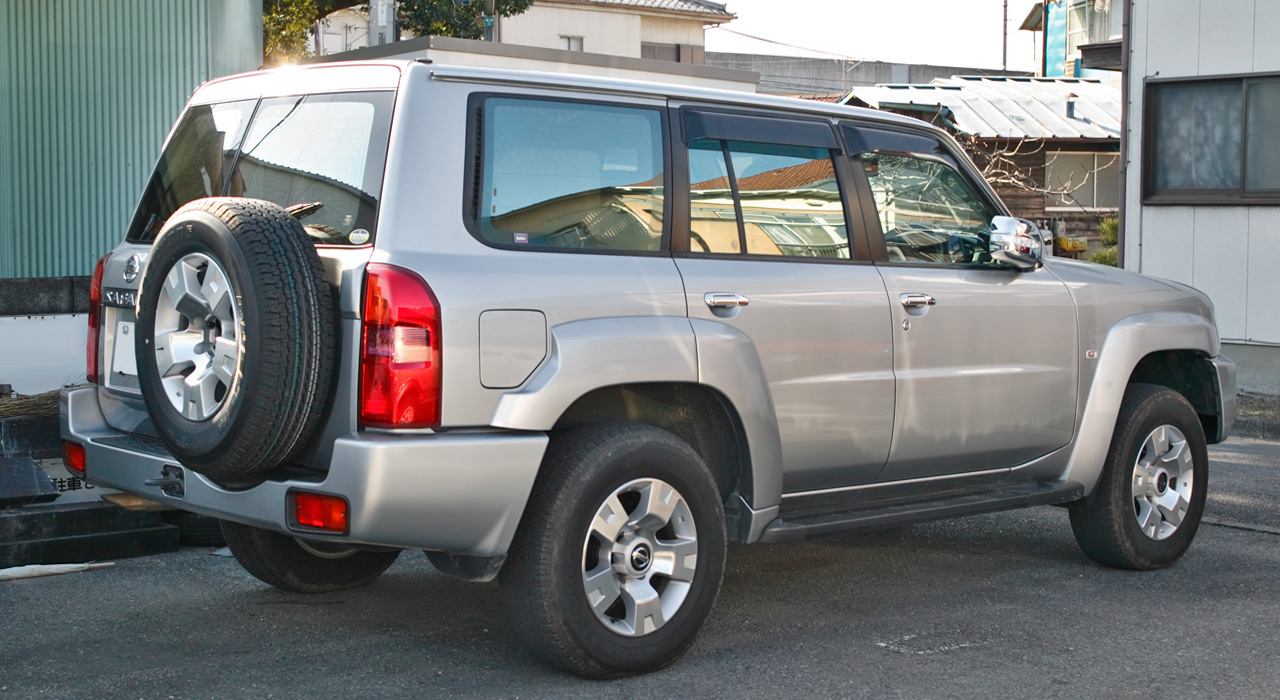
Nissan Safari (second facelift)

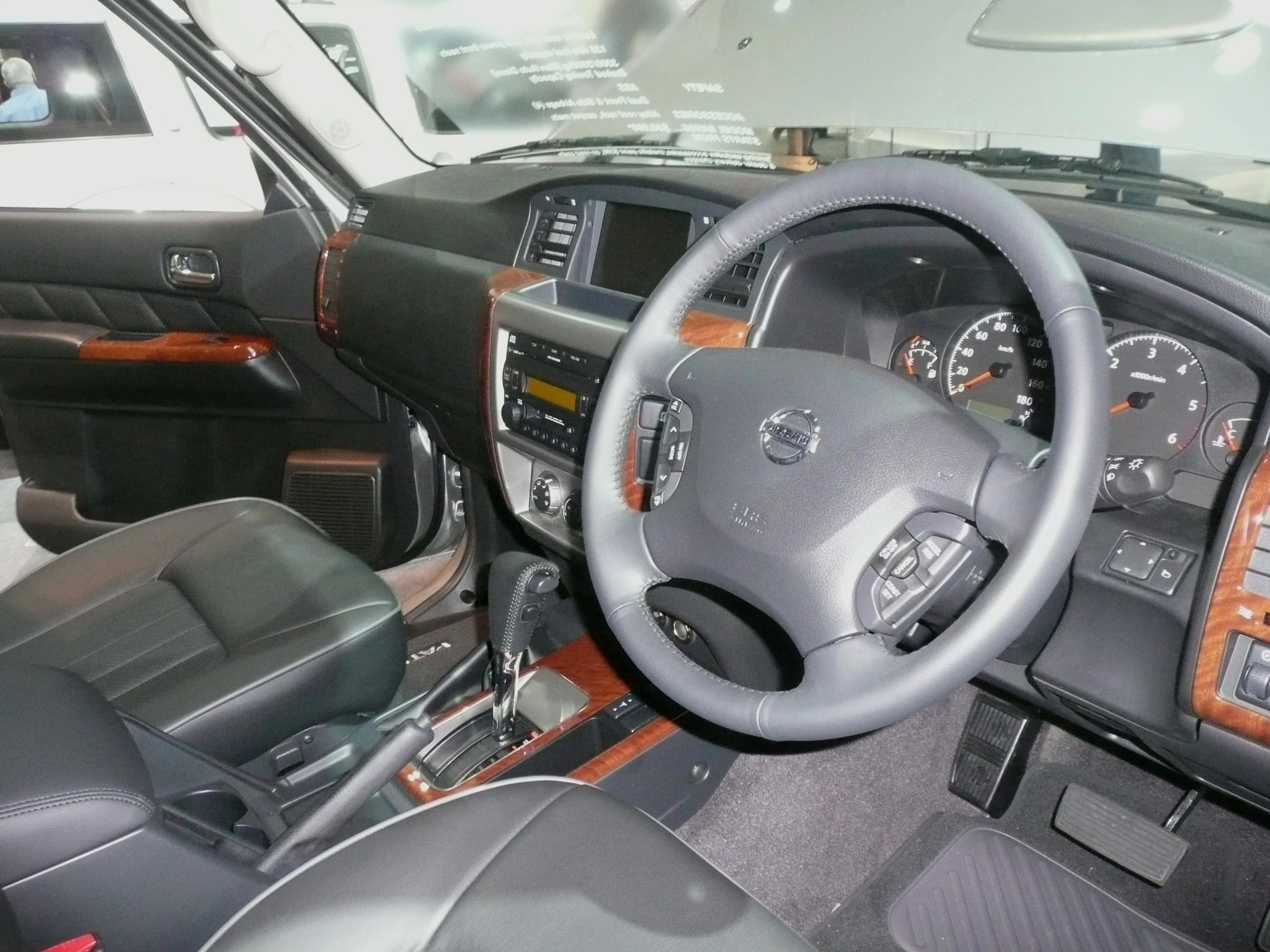
Interior

=== Safety ===
ANCAP test results* Nissan Patrol variants with dual frontal airbags (2010)
Test	Score
Overall	3 /5 stars
Frontal offset	5.60/16
Side impact	16/16
Pole	Not Assessed
Seat belt reminders	0/3
Whiplash protection	Not Assessed
Pedestrian protection	Poor
Electronic stability control	Not Available

ANCAP test results* Nissan Patrol Y61 series with 3 litre diesel engine (2011)
Test	Score
Overall	3 /5 stars
Frontal offset	6.17/16
Side impact	16/16
Pole	Not Assessed
Seat belt reminders	0/3
Whiplash protection	Not Assessed
Pedestrian protection	Marginal
Electronic stability control	Standard

== Sixth generation (Y62; 2010) ==
Sixth generation
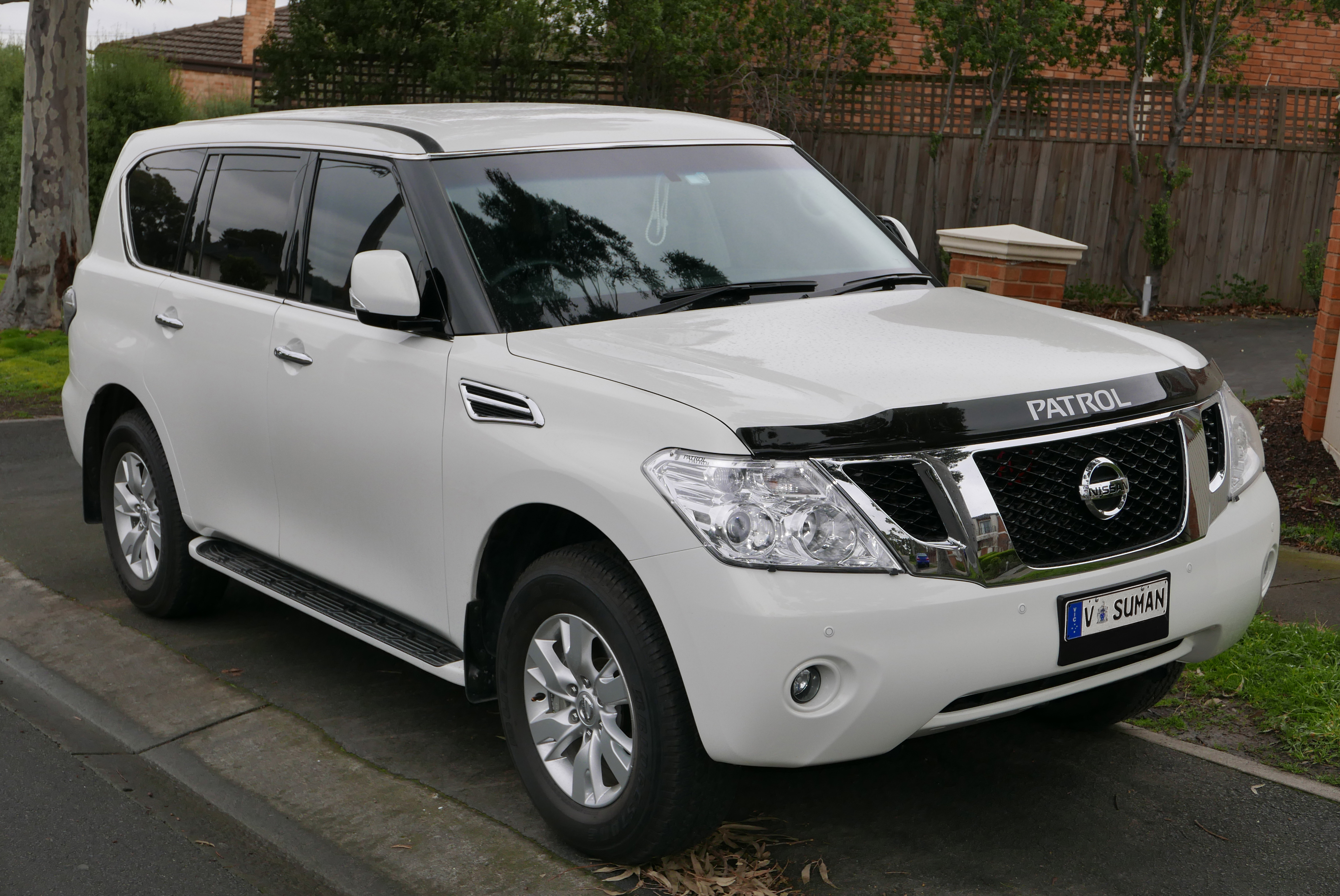
- Pre-facelift

Overview
- Model code: Y62
- Also called: Nissan Armada (2016–2024)
- Production: January 2010 – August 2026
- Assembly: Japan: Kanda; Nigeria: Lagos (2014–2024); Russia: Saint-Petersburg, (SKD, 2012–2014)
- Designer: Taiji Toyota (2007)

Body and chassis
- Class: Full-size SUV
- Body style: 5-door SUV
- Layout: Front-engine, rear-wheel drive; Front-engine, four-wheel drive
- Platform: Y62
- Related: Infiniti QX56/QX80; Nissan Armada (Y62); Nissan Terra; Nissan Navara (D23)

Powertrain
- Engine: Petrol: 4.0 L VQ40DE V6; 5.6 L VK56DE/VK56VD V8
- Transmission: 5-speed automatic; 7-speed RE7R01B automatic; 6-Speed manual (2010–16)

Dimensions
- Wheelbase: 3,075 mm (121.1 in)
- Length: 5,165 mm (203.3 in)
- Width: 1,995 mm (78.5 in)
- Height: 1,940 mm (76.4 in)
- Curb weight: 2,695–2,795 kg (5,941–6,162 lb)

The all-new, sixth generation, Y62 series Nissan Patrol was launched on 13 February 2010 in Abu Dhabi. A luxury version (Z62) was sold as the Infiniti QX56 from 2010 (the first time that a Patrol-based vehicle had been sold in North America since the 60 series in 1969), which was later renamed the Infiniti QX80 in 2013 for the 2014 model year. Despite being built by Nissan Shatai in Japan, the Y62 was an export-only product not sold in Japan due to its massive size, although many Japanese reverse-exported the model to Japan as grey import vehicles, due to the popularity of reverse-exporting Japanese-made export-only models. Most Y62 Patrols in Japan are LHD US-spec Armadas, while few of them are from the Middle East and Oceania, mostly registered as Commercial Vehicles (1-Number Plate), while some rare models are registered as 3-Number Luxury Vehicles. The Y62 was introduced in North America under the Armada nameplate in 2016, for the 2017 model year. It was presented as a replacement for the Titan-based first generation Nissan Armada (WA60).

As of 2017, the Y62 is powered by either a 205 kW (275 hp) / 394 N⋅m (291 lb⋅ft) 4.0-litre VQ40DE V6 engine for the entry level XE and SE trims or a more powerful 298 kW (400 hp) / 560 N⋅m (410 lb⋅ft) 5.6-litre VK56VD V8 engine for the upper level trims. The NISMO edition uses a tuned version of the 5.6-litre V8 producing an additional 21 kW (28 hp). Prior to the introduction of the 4.0-litre V6, a lower output 236 kW (317 hp) / 526 N⋅m (388 lb⋅ft) 5.6-litre VK56DE V8 was designated for the entry level trims.

As of 2017, all models come with a 7-speed automatic transmission although Nissan previously offered a 5-speed automatic and also a 6-speed manual for the entry level trim. A variable 4×4 mode package allows switching between four drive modes: sand, on-road, rock and snow. A Hydraulic Body Motion Control System is available. An electronic-locking rear differential, hill start and hill descent control, as well as lane-departure warning, computer assisted braking and stability control. The Nissan Patrol launched in Australia in early 2013.

The Nissan Patrol is offered in various different trim levels in the Middle East: XE, SE, SE-Platinum City, LE, LE-Titanium, LE-Platinum City and NISMO Edition. In Australia the Ti and Ti-L trim levels are offered, in 2023 the Warrior trim was launched, an off-roading focused trim based on Ti and modified by Premcar.

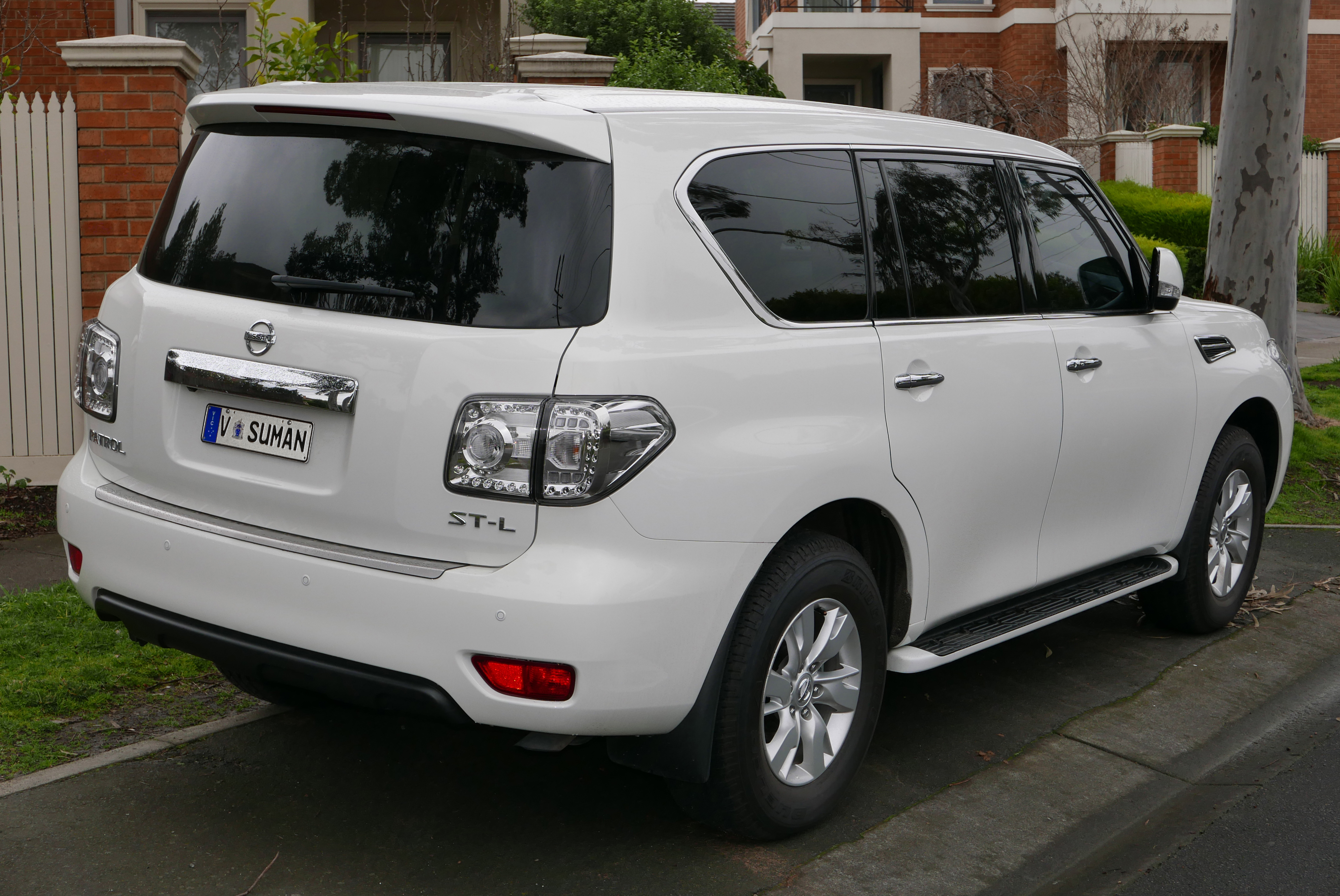
Rear view (pre-facelift)

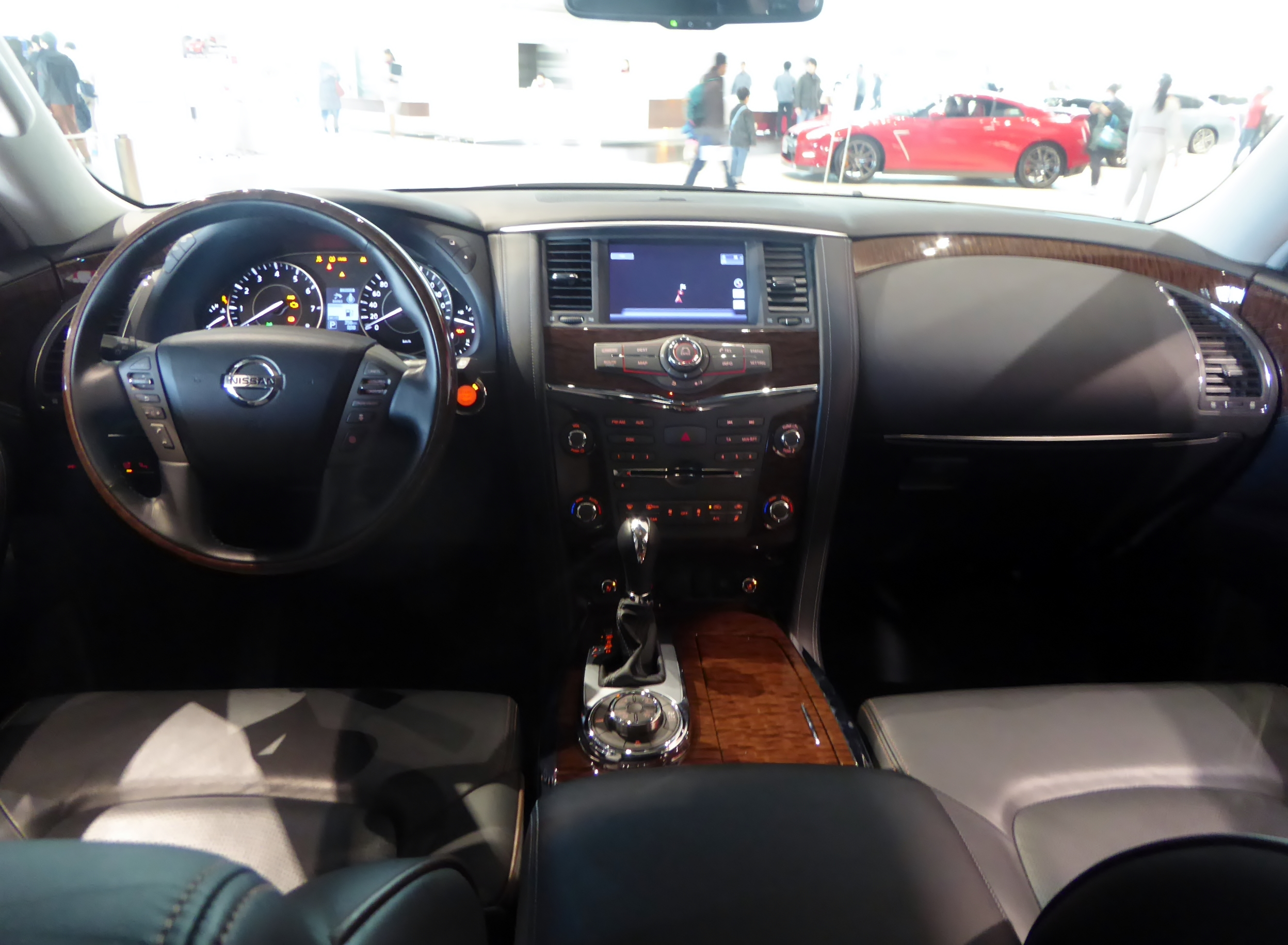
Interior

=== Facelift ===
In June 2014, a minor facelift arrived, with revised tail lights with red elements present, globe housings and built-in LED headlights. A new tan interior was added and new sets of wheels.

Nissan introduced a limited-run Patrol Black Special Edition in 200 units. These cars offer several enhancements such as red seats, chrome detailing and a black matte exterior paint scheme.

The Patrol received a more significant, second facelift in 2019. Changes include a new front bumper featuring a deeper apron and a traditional round housing. The vehicle will be equipped with Nissan's Intelligent Mobility driver-assistance features like lane keeping assist, forward collision warning, automatic emergency braking for front and rear, rear cross traffic alert, and blind spot monitoring.

In December 2021, the 70th Anniversary was launched in the Middle East. It features a honeycomb grille and the interior gets a 12.3-inch infotainment screen with wireless Apple CarPlay and Android Auto connectivity along with new 10.1-inch rear entertainment screens.

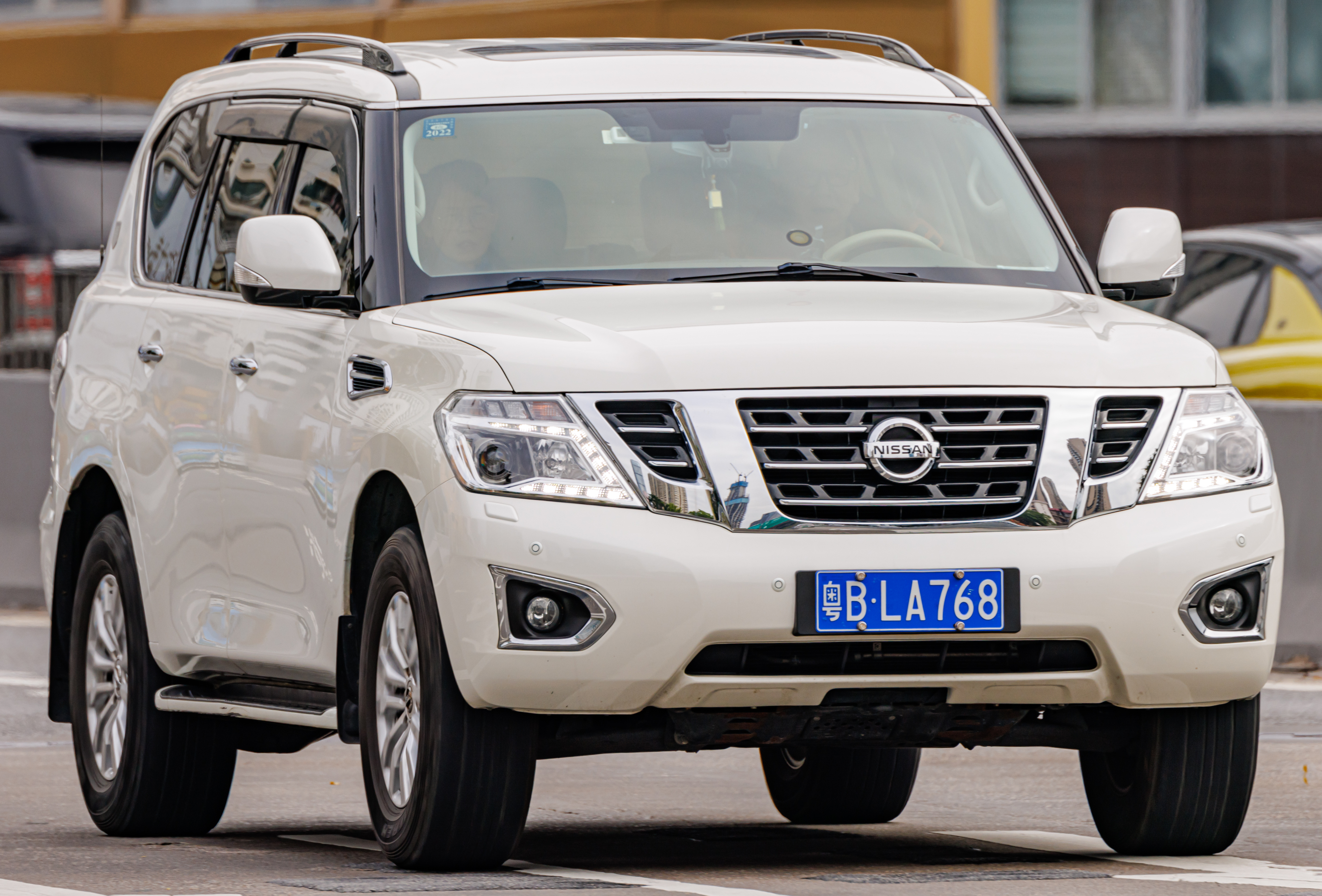
First facelift

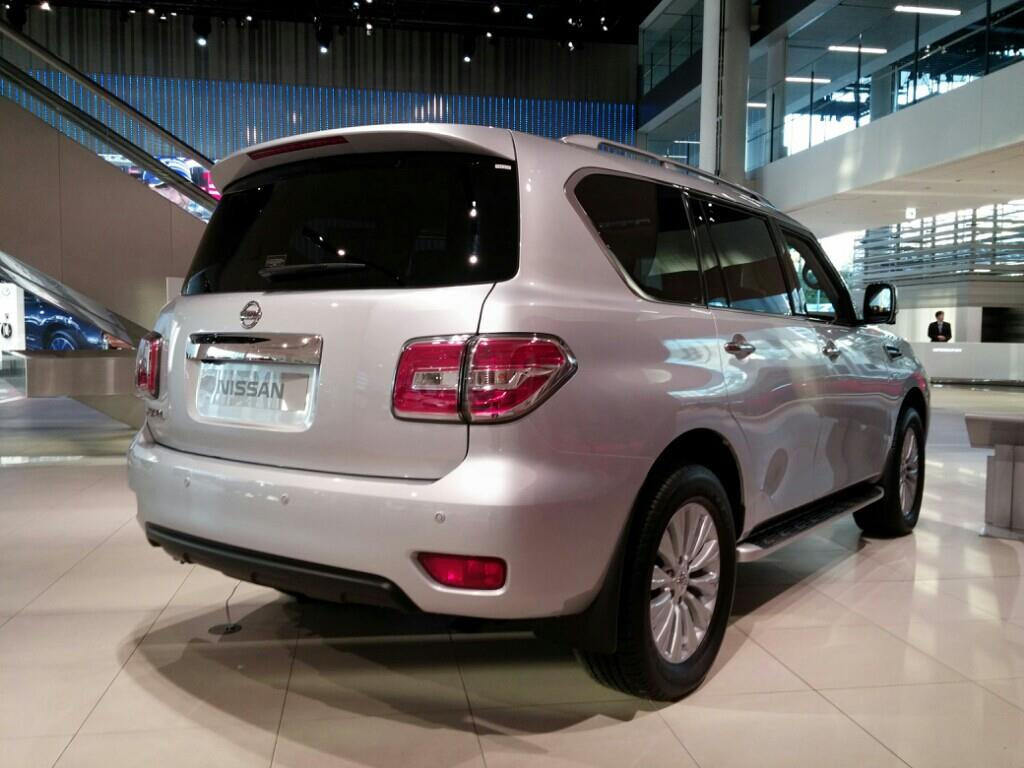
Rear view (first facelift)

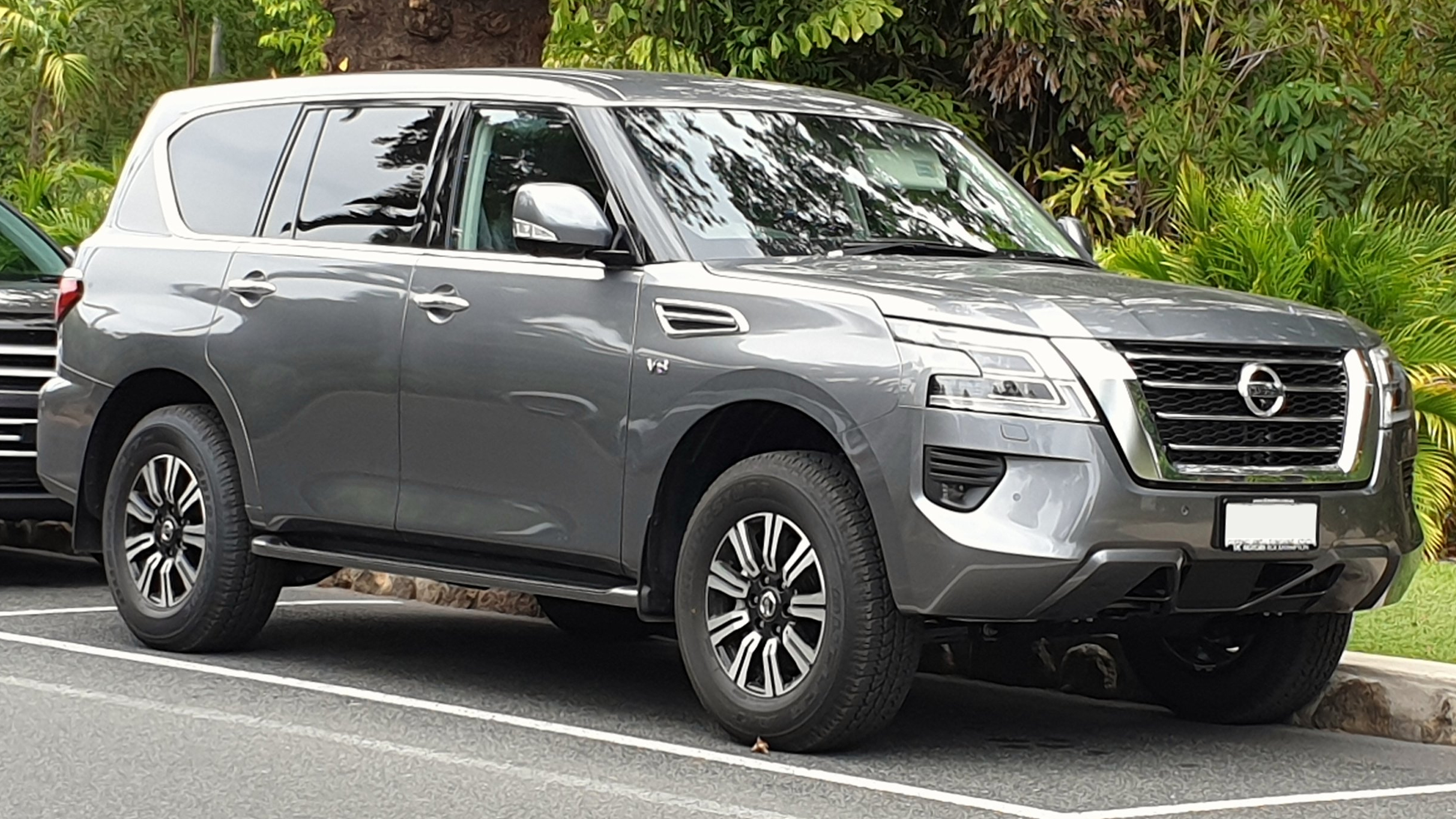
Second facelift

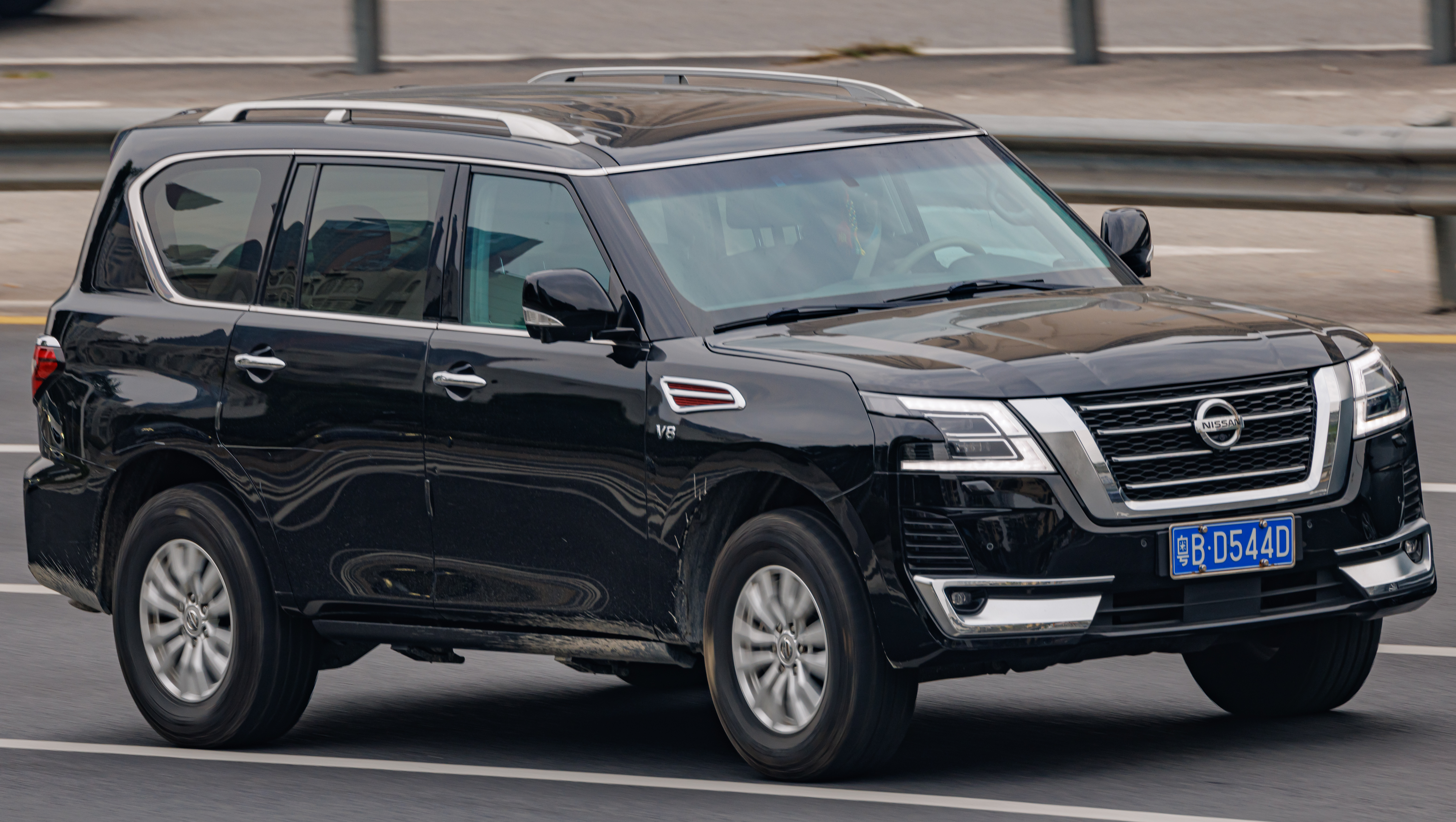
Second facelift (China)

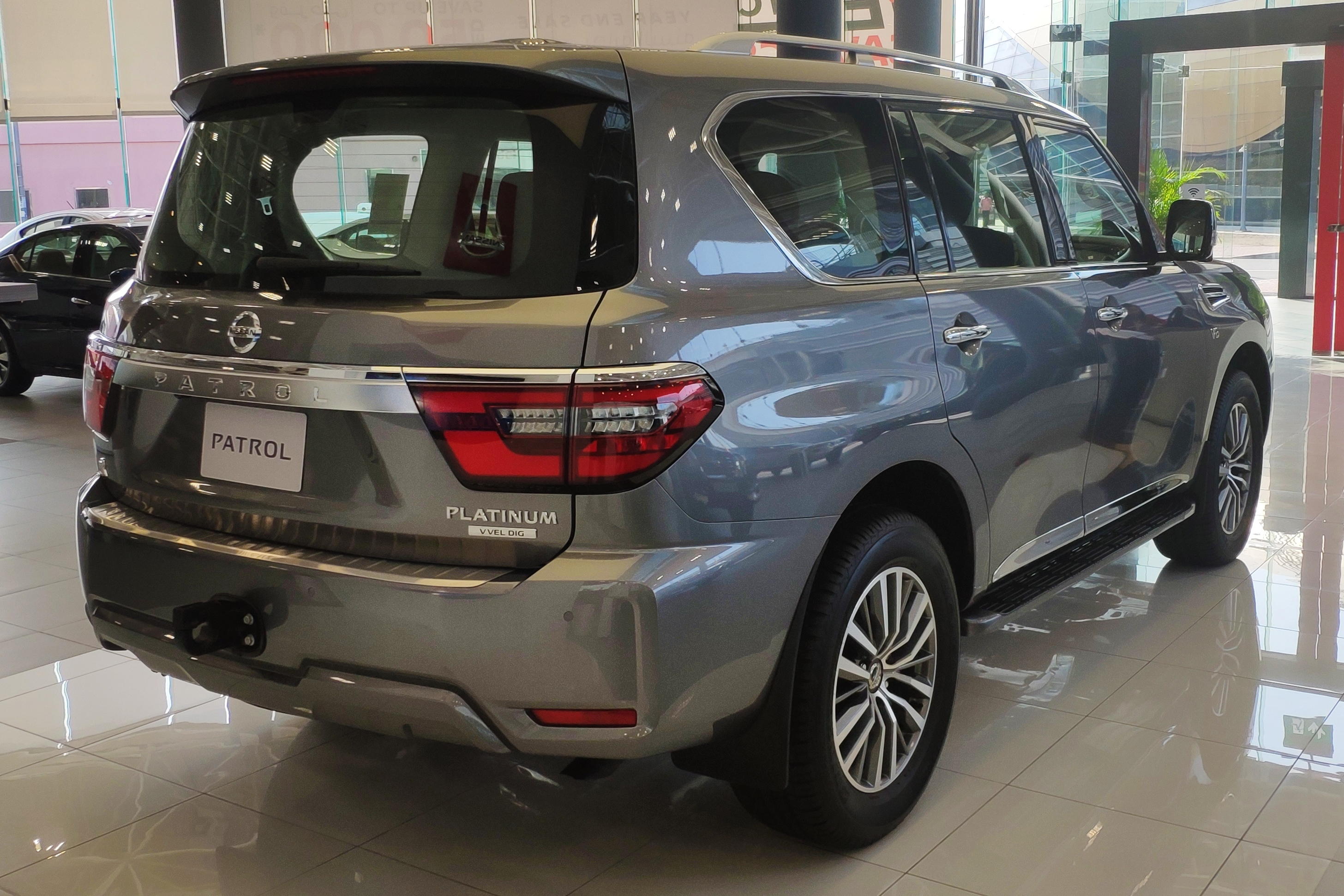
Rear view (second facelift)

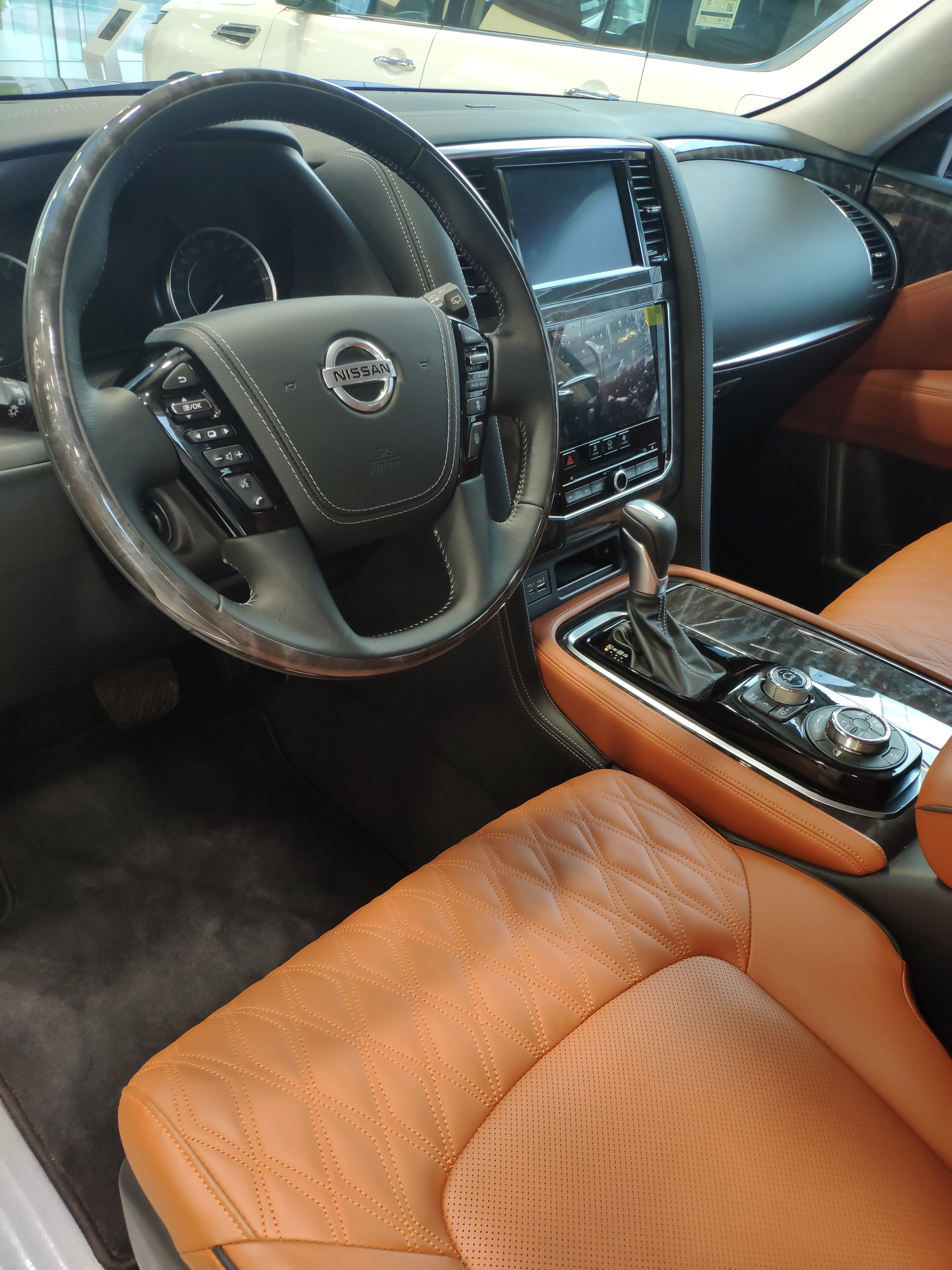
Interior (second facelift)

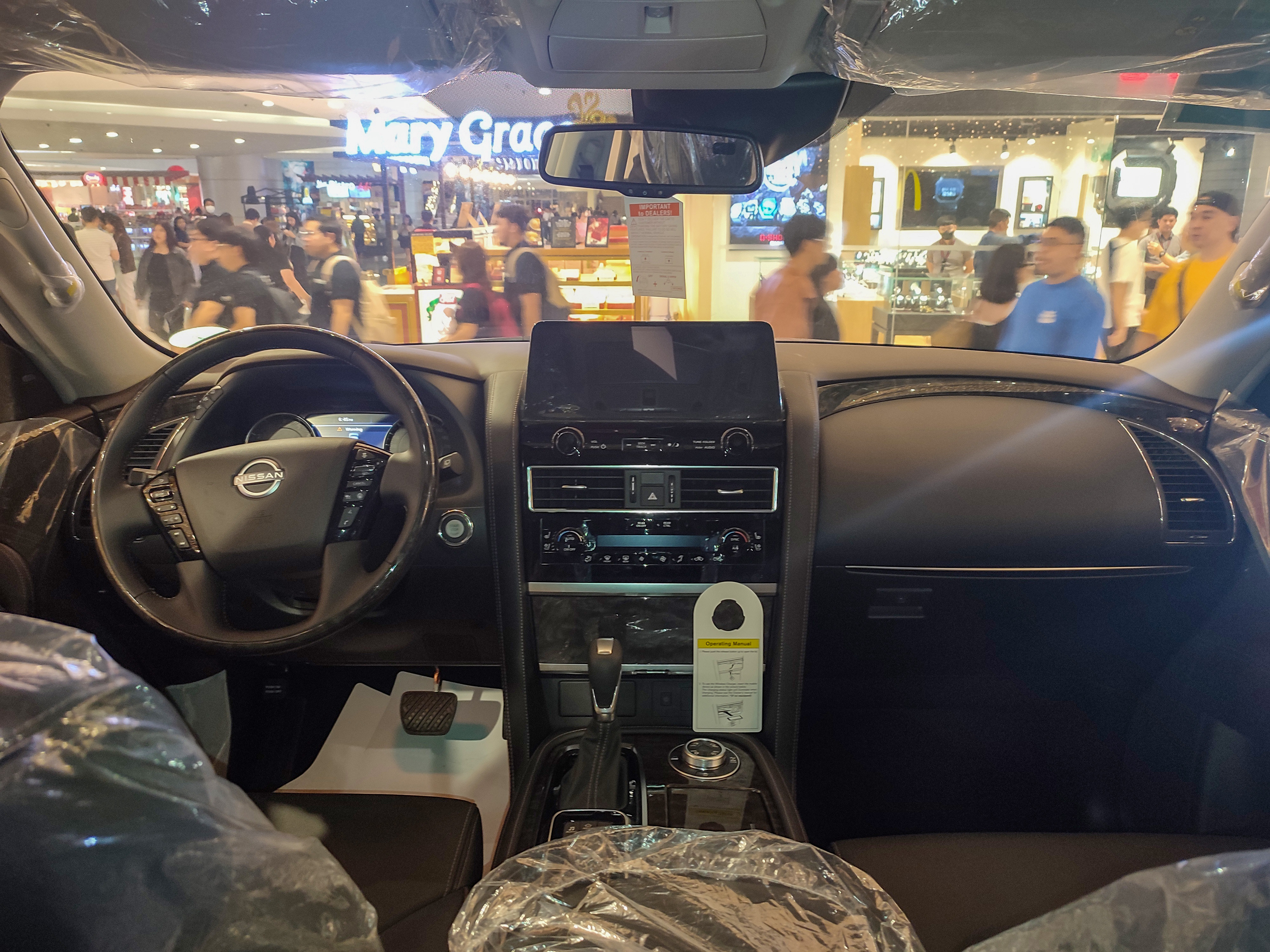
Interior (70th Anniversary)

=== Patrol Desert Edition ===
The Desert Edition comes with the 300 kW (400 hp) 5.6-litre (5552cc) engine, manually-adjusted cloth seats, navigation and regular suspension instead of the hydraulic body-control system.

=== Patrol Nismo ===
On launching the Nismo brand in the Middle East, the Nissan Patrol Nismo was introduced at the launch event in Dubai along with the GT-R Nismo and 370Z Nismo. Unlike the standard Patrol, the Nismo version comes with (5.6-litre) V8 with 319 kW (428 hp) engine tuned by Nissan's Takumi craftsmen. The suspensions is upgraded with Bilstein shocks and fitted with 22-inch forged-alloy wheels.

The facelifted Patrol Nismo was revealed on 31 March 2021.

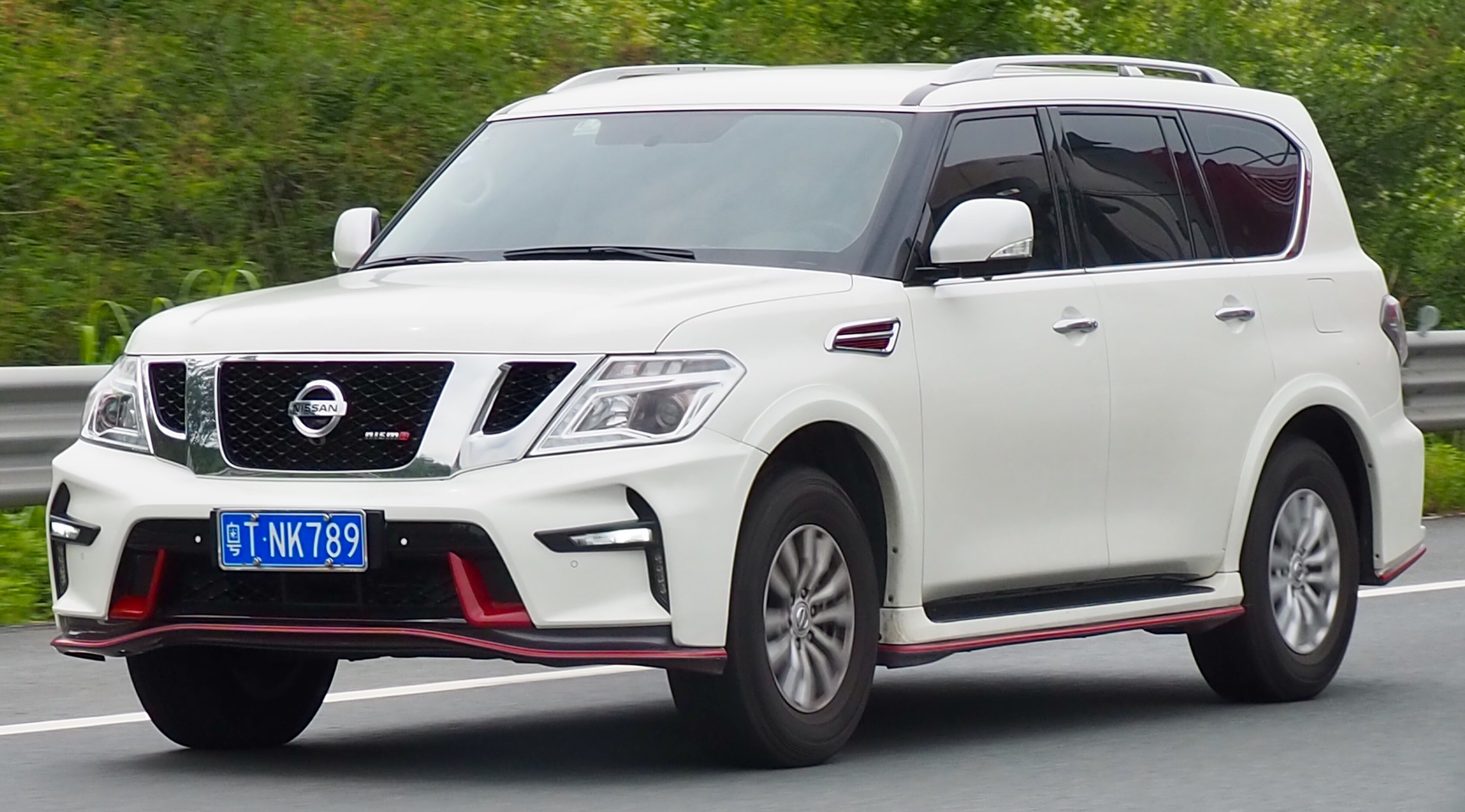
2018 Nissan Patrol Nismo (front)

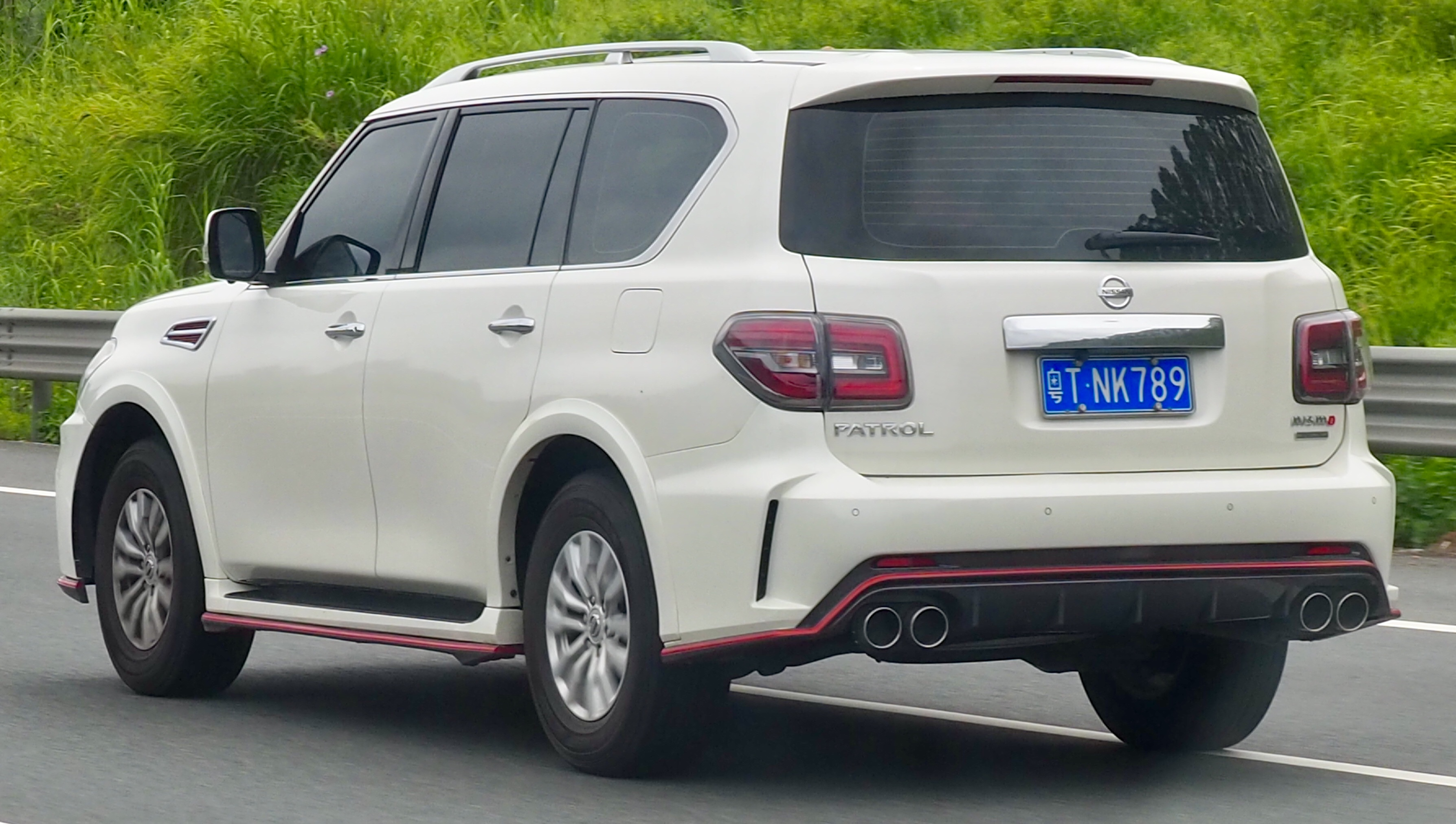
2018 Nissan Patrol Nismo (rear)

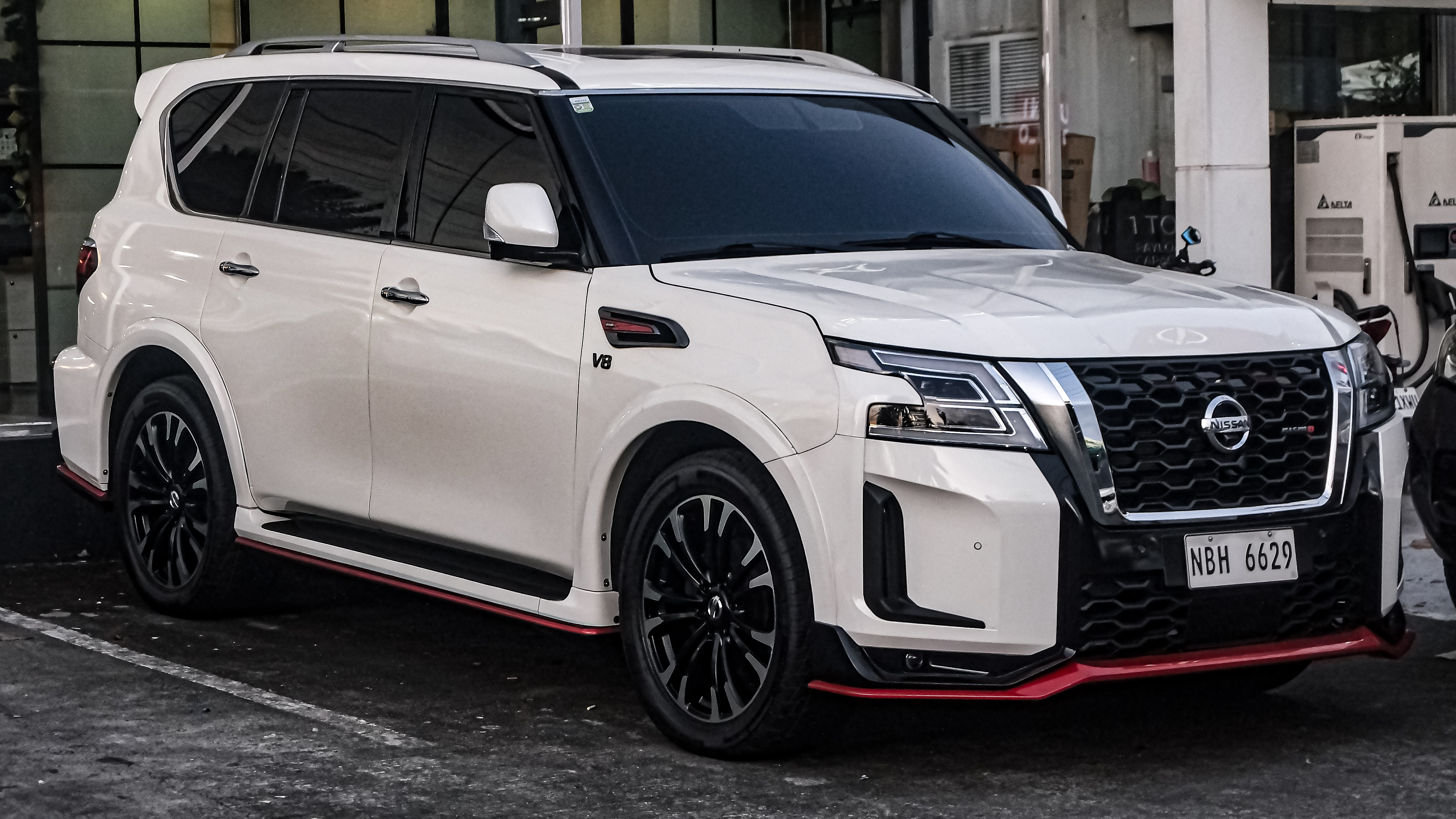
2021 Nissan Patrol Nismo (facelift)

== Seventh generation (Y63; 2024) ==
Seventh generation
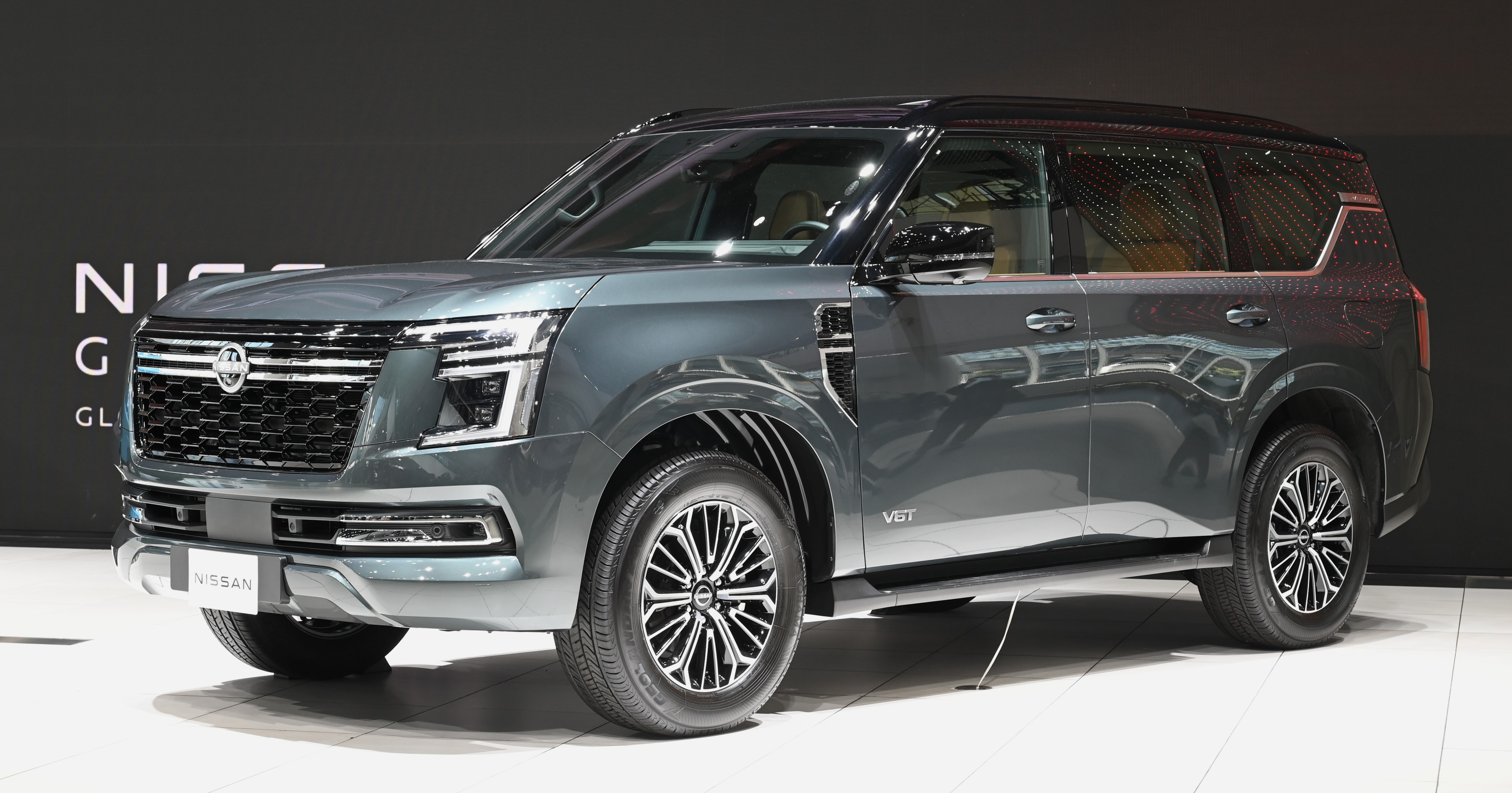

Overview
- Model code: Y63
- Also called: Nissan Armada (North America)
- Production: October 2024–present
- Assembly: Japan: Kanda (Nissan Shatai Kyushu Plant)
- Designer: Ken Lee

Body and chassis
- Class: Full-size SUV
- Body style: 5-door SUV
- Related: Infiniti QX80 (Z63)

Powertrain
- Engine: Petrol: 3.5 L VR35DDTT twin-turbo V6; 3.8 L VQ38DD V6
- Power output: 313–369 kW (425–502 PS) (VR35DDTT); 232 kW (316 PS) (VQ38DD)
- Transmission: 9-speed automatic

Dimensions
- Wheelbase: 3,075 mm (121.1 in)
- Length: 5,350 mm (210.6 in)
- Width: 2,030 mm (79.9 in)
- Height: 1,945–1,955 mm (76.6–77.0 in)
- Curb weight: 2,680–2,813 kg (5,908–6,202 lb)

The Y63 series Patrol was unveiled in Abu Dhabi on 3 September 2024. It went on sale in the Middle East on 1 November 2024.

The model showcases C-shaped LED headlights framing a large 3D chrome grille, rugged bumpers, and a distinctive upward kick at the D-pillar leading to a floating roofline. It measures approximately 5,200 mm (204.7 in) long, 2,025 mm (79.7 in) wide, and 1,940 mm (76.4 in) tall, with up to 22-inch wheels, 275 mm (10.8 in) ground clearance, and options like panoramic sunroofs and roof rails across trims. Rear design includes full-width LED light bars and squared-off tailgates.

Inside, the cabin offers premium leatherette or leather upholstery in colors like black, tan, or beige, with spacious seating for up to eight and a 30% wider third row. Dual 14.3-inch screens form a 28.6-inch dashboard display for digital gauges and infotainment, plus rear passenger screens, a 7-inch head-up display, and Google Built-In connectivity. Advanced touches include infrared climate control sensors, ergonomic controls, and modular trunk space with power liftgates.

The base powertrain is a 3.8-liter naturally aspirated V6 engine producing 236 kW (316 hp) and 386 N⋅m (285 lb⋅ft) of torque, paired with a 9-speed automatic transmission and 4WD. Higher trims use a 3.5-liter twin-turbo V6 delivering 317 kW (425 hp) and 700 N⋅m (516 lb⋅ft), also with a 9-speed AT and 4WD, achieving 0-100 km/h in 6.7 seconds. There are trim levels offered for the Middle Eastern market includes XE, SE, SE Titanium, SE Platinum City, LE, LE Titanium and LE Platinum City.

On 14 June 2025, the Pro-4X trim was added in the Middle East, which was carried over from the Armada in the North American market.

On 28 October 2025, at the Japan Mobility Show, Nissan confirmed the Patrol would make its return to the Japanese market in fiscal year 2027 after a 20-year hiatus. Despite being built in Japan, the Y62 Patrol was an export-only product; the Y63 will thus be the first Patrol sold in Japan since the Y61 Safari was discontinued in 2007. Following the discontinuation of the GT-R, it will serve as the flagship model in the Japanese Nissan range.

Nissan announced that it will release this generation for the Australian market in November 2026. It has a 3,700 kg (8,157 lb) braked towing capacity, 200 kg (441 lb) more than the previous generation.

The Nissan Patrol 75th Anniversary Edition was launched on 1 October 2026, it is a limited-edition based on the Platinum V6 Twin Turbo grade, exclusively for the GCC region to mark 75 years of the nameplate, with an initial production run of 1,951 units.

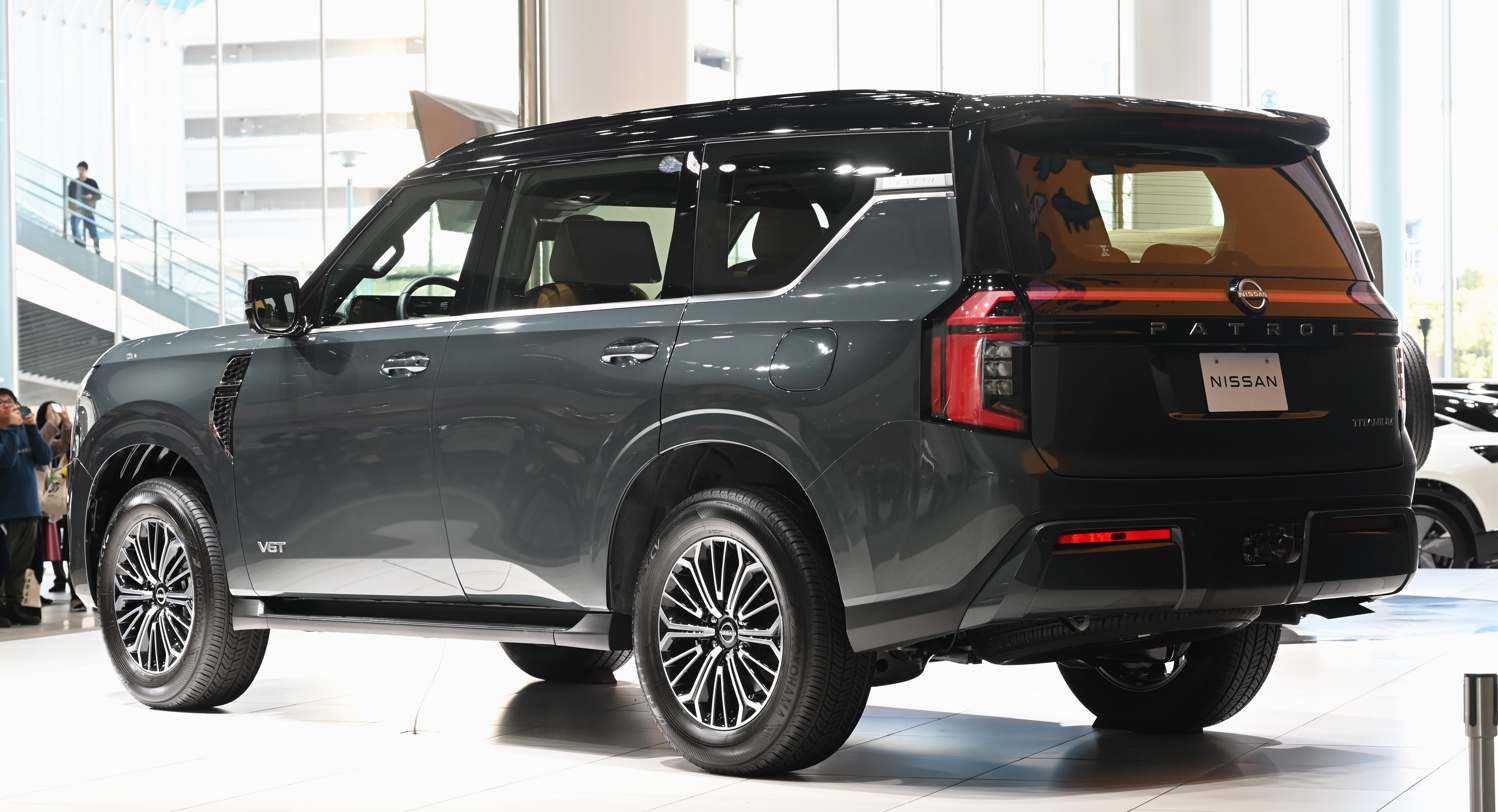
Rear View

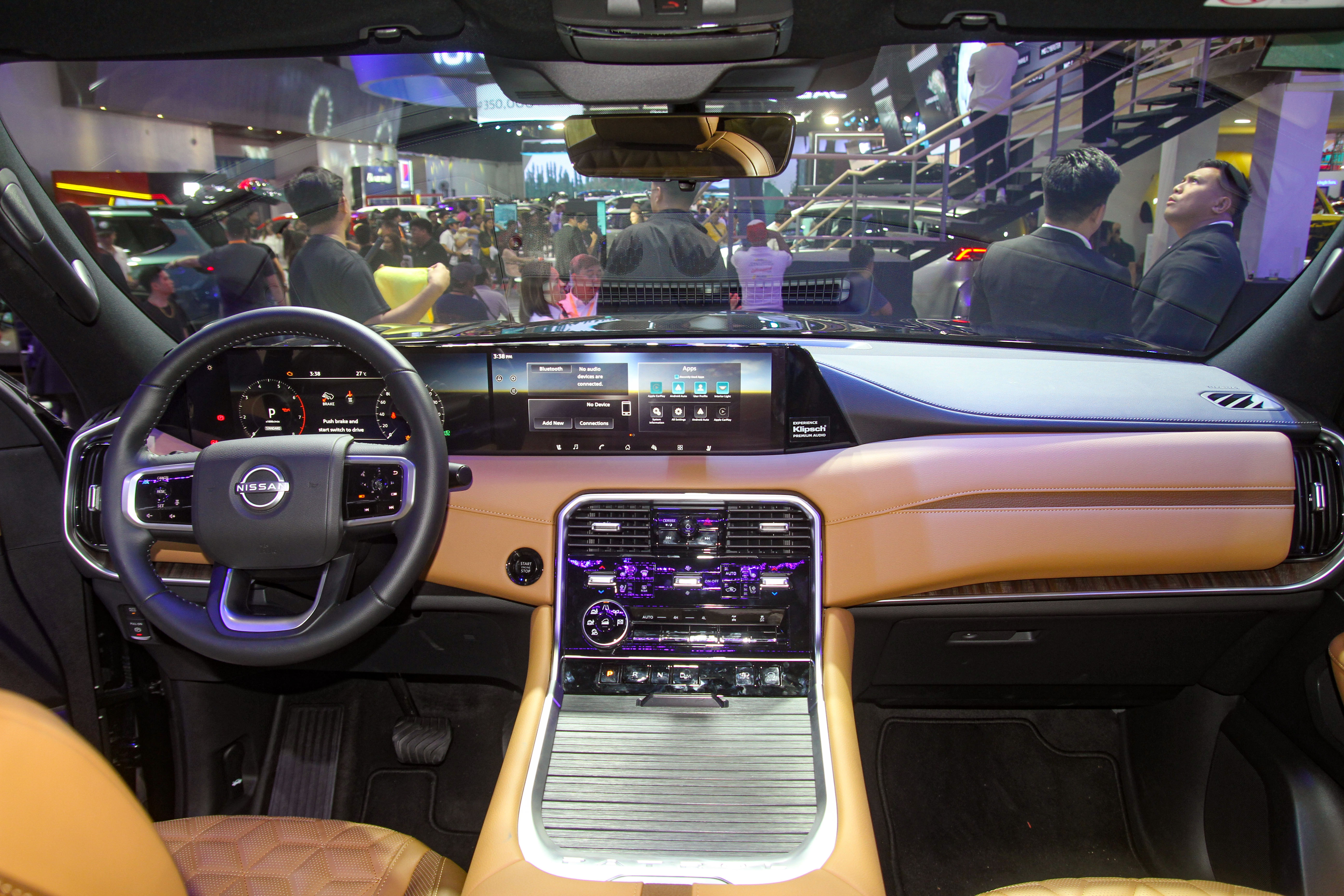
Interior

=== Patrol Nismo ===
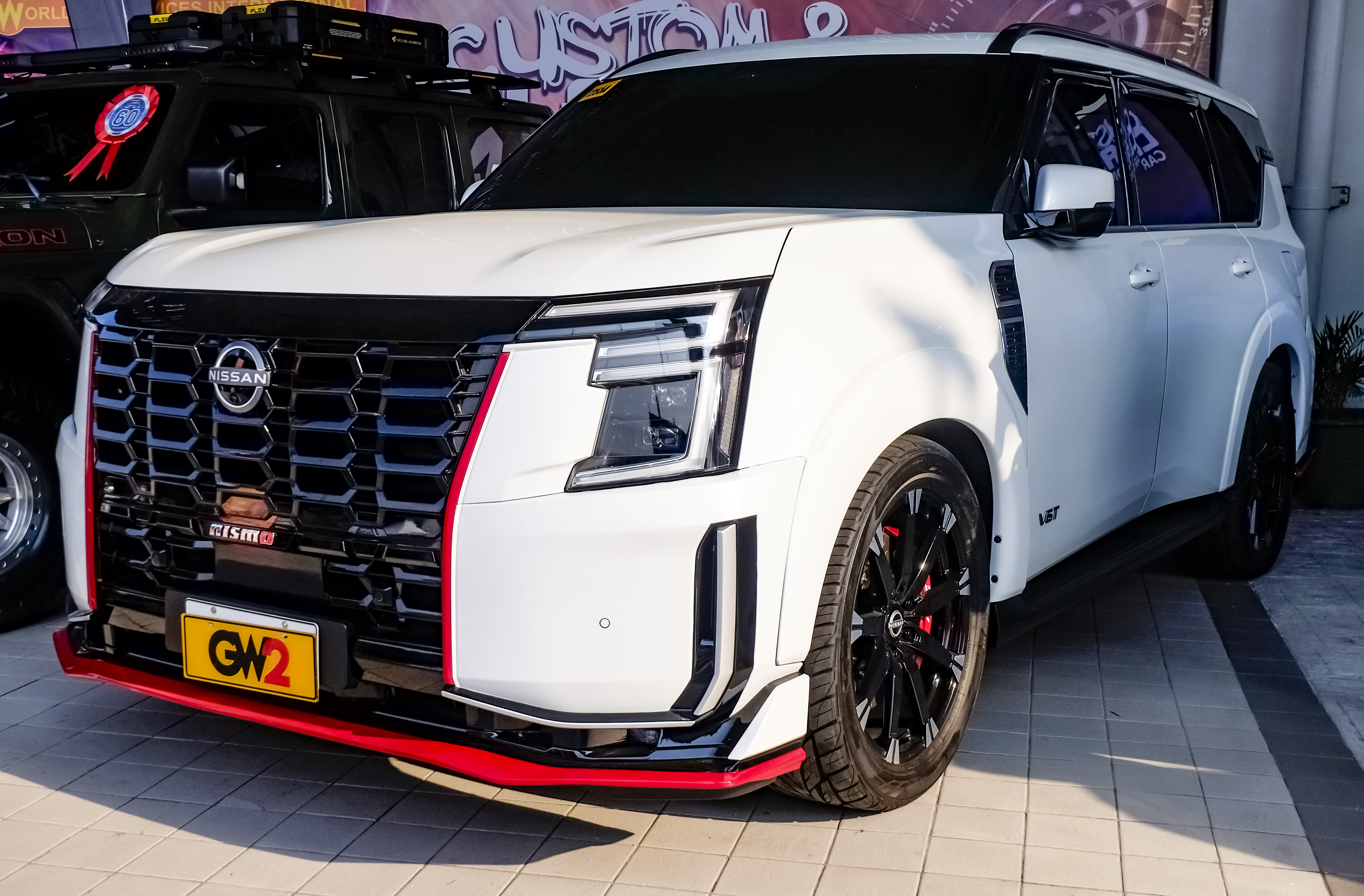
Nissan Patrol Nismo

The Patrol Nismo was unveiled in the Middle East alongside the Z Nismo on 24 June 2025.

The Nismo variant includes a unique front grille with air curtains for improved airflow, a front spoiler that splits air horizontally, and red accents throughout for a sporty aesthetic. This version outputs 369 kW (495 hp) and 700 N⋅m (516 lb⋅ft) of torque. It measures 90 mm (3.5 in) longer and 40 mm (1.6 in) wider than the standard Y63 Patrol, with additions like NISMO over fenders, side vents, a larger rear spoiler, Formula E-inspired rear fog lamp, 22-inch forged Rays wheels, and red-painted brake calipers.

The cabin mirrors the standard Patrol but adopts a black-and-red theme with leather upholstery, red stitching on seats, doors, console, and dashboard, plus red seat belts and a red start/stop button. Race-style aluminum pedals, NISMO branding on seats and headrests, and features like a connected screen panel, four-zone climate control, wireless charging, and Klipsch premium audio enhance the sporty luxury.

== Sales ==
Calendar year	UAE	Australia
2004		
2005		
2006		
2007		
2008		
2009		
2010		
2011		
2012		
2013		
2014	12,260	1,859
2015	30,439	1,875
2016	24,346	2,003
2017	21,772	916
2018	22,626	1,259
2019	16,590	1,951
2020	15,670	2,820
2021		3,333
2022		5,724
2023		7,812
2024	16,399	8,293
2025	16,769	6,263
