= QX =

QX or qx may refer to:

== Arts and media ==
- QX (magazine), Scandinavia
- QX (British magazine), England
- CFQX-FM, a Canadian country music radio station

== Business ==
- QX Metals
- Quality of Experience
- Horizon Air (IATA airline designator: QX)

== Computing ==
- Epson QX-10 and QX-16, microcomputers
- QX/V32c, QX/4232 and QX/4232bis, a series of modems made by Microcom
- Alternative name for the IBM Quantum Experience

== Science ==
- q_{x}, the probability of death of a person aged x years, before reaching the age x + 1; see life table § The mathematics
- QX, a disease of oysters caused by the Marteilia parasite
- Duponol QX, otherwise known as Sodium dodecyl sulfate

== Vehicles ==
- Q-type Queens car (New York City Subway car)
- Infiniti QX, a luxury sports utility vehicle
- Nissan Maxima (UK: QX), a large car built in the 1990s

== Other uses ==
- QX, part of the Q3A Panel house series of prefabricated buildings
- QX1, QX2, etc., a series of music sequencers made by Yamaha
- ⟨q͡χ⟩, symbol for the voiceless uvular affricate in the International Phonetic Alphabet
- ⟨qx’⟩, a trigraph representing /qχʼ/ in the Taa language
