= NGP =

NGP may refer to:

- NGP VAN
- Nagpur, a city in Maharashtra, India.
  - Nagpur Junction railway station (station code: NGP) in Nagpur
- Cessna NGP, next generation propeller aircraft
- National General Pictures, a distribution and film production company
- Natural growth promoter, feed additives for farm animals
- Naval Air Station Corpus Christi
- Neo Geo Pocket, a handheld video game system produced by SNK
- Neighbouring group participation, a chemistry principle
- Nevada Geothermal Power Inc., a renewable energy developer
- Next Generation Portable, codename of the handheld game console PlayStation Vita
- "Next Generation Platform", expected to replace Scratch (programming language) at the end of 2026
