= Infiniti QX80 =

Full-size luxury SUV

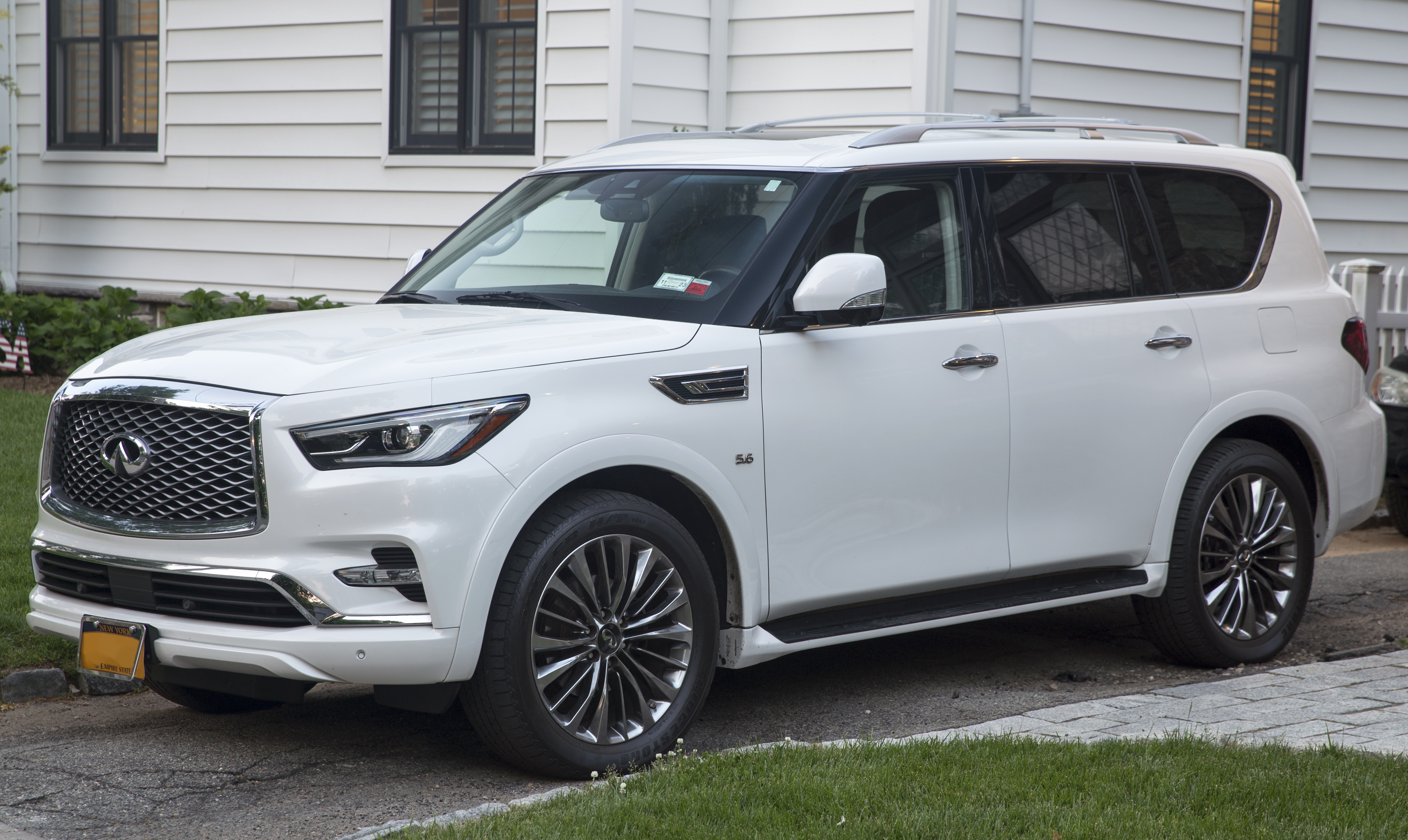
- 2019 Infiniti QX80 (US)

Overview
- Manufacturer: Nissan
- Also called: Infiniti QX56 (2004–2013)
- Production: 2004–present

Body and chassis
- Class: Full-size luxury SUV
- Body style: 5-door SUV
- Layout: Front-engine, rear-wheel-drive Front-engine, four-wheel-drive
- Chassis: Body-on-frame

Chronology
- Predecessor: Infiniti QX4

The Infiniti QX80 (formerly called the Infiniti QX56 until 2013) is a full-size luxury SUV marketed by Nissan's luxury division Infiniti since the 2004 model year. The first-generation QX56 was built in the United States and is based on the first-generation Armada. The second-generation model was released in 2010 as a model produced in Japan, which used the sixth-generation Patrol (later also marketed as the second-generation Armada since 2016) as the base vehicle instead. Since the 2014 model year in 2013, the vehicle was renamed to the QX80 as Infiniti renamed their entire product line under a new nomenclature.

== First generation (JA60; 2004) ==
First generation
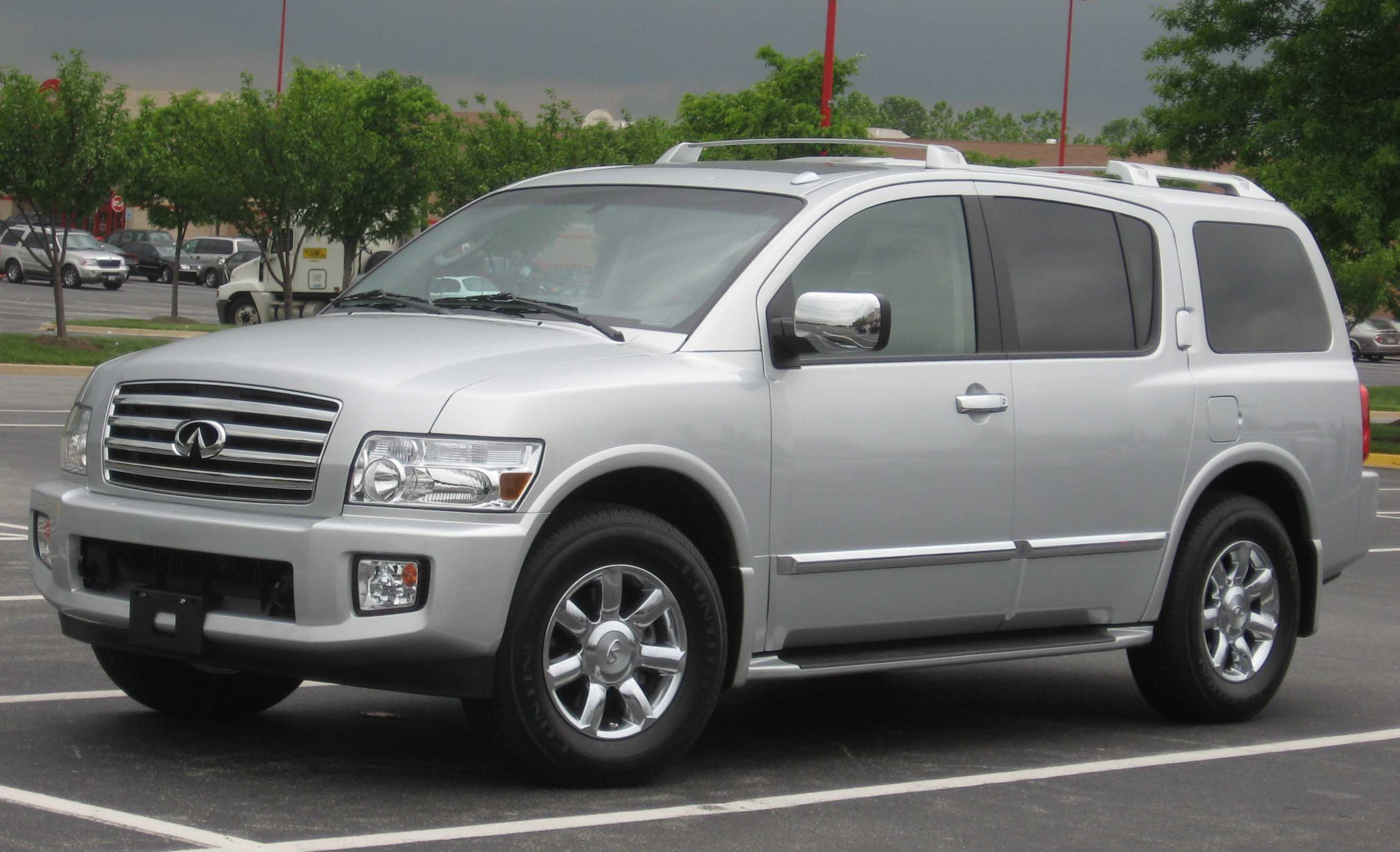

Overview
- Model code: JA60
- Also called: Nissan Armada
- Production: January 2004 – May 2010
- Model years: 2004–2010
- Assembly: United States: Canton, Mississippi (Nissan USA)
- Designer: Masato Takahashi (2001)

Body and chassis
- Platform: Nissan F-Alpha platform
- Related: Nissan Titan (A60); Nissan Pathfinder (R51); Nissan Xterra (N50); Nissan Frontier (D40)

Powertrain
- Engine: Gasoline: 5.6 L V8 VK56DE
- Transmission: 5-speed automatic

Dimensions
- Wheelbase: 3,129 mm (123.2 in)
- Length: 5,255 mm (206.9 in)
- Width: 2,002–2,019 mm (78.8–79.5 in)
- Height: 1,956–1,999 mm (77.0–78.7 in)
- Curb weight: 2,539 kg (5,597 lb)

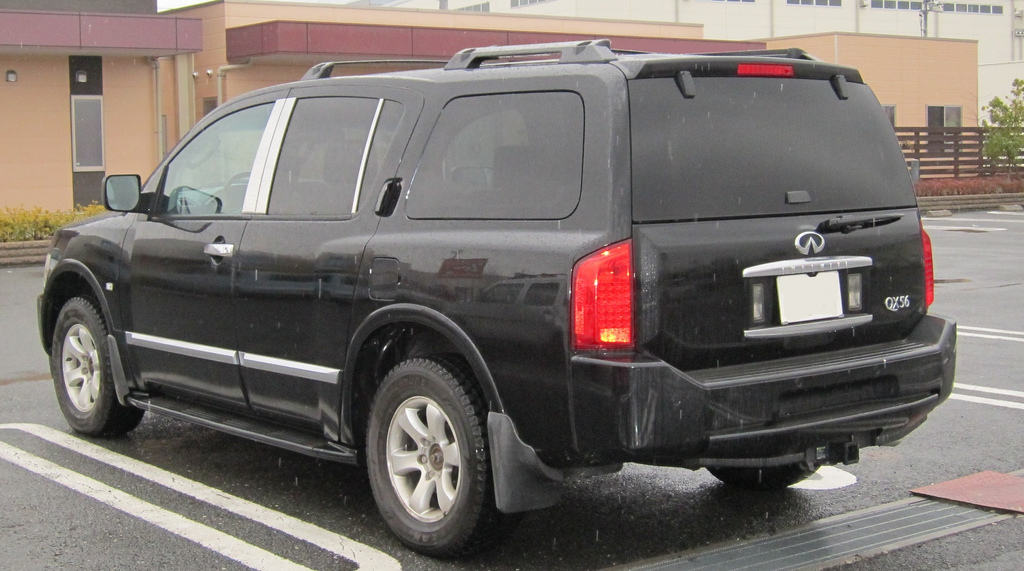
Rear view

The first-generation QX56 (model code JA60) is based on the first-generation Armada, while also sharing the F-Alpha platform with the first-generation Titan. It is the first Infiniti built in the United States. The QX56 was only marketed in the United States, Canada, GCC countries and Russia. Development on the JA60 QX56 began in early 2000 alongside the WA60 Armada. A final design by Masato Takahashi was reached in early 2001, with an August 2001 design freeze for early 2004 start of production.

The rear door handles were installed on the C-pillar as a Nissan design tradition started with the D21 Pathfinder released in 1985 to visually make it appear like a two-door truck with a camper shell, with conventional door handles on the front doors.

The first-generation QX56 was powered by a 5.6-liter VK56DE V8 engine, producing 320 hp (239 kW) at 4,900 rpm and 393 lb⋅ft (533 N⋅m) torque at 3,600 rpm, and a 5-speed automatic transmission with overdrive. As is common with aluminum blocks, each cylinder in the engine was lined with cast iron. The valvetrain was a DOHC design with four valves per cylinder. Infiniti designed the QX56's throttle responsiveness to correspond to specific drivetrain modes: when the driver selects all-wheel drive the throttle becomes less sensitive, presumably to allow easier regulation of acceleration when off-road.

The QX56 had around 9,000 lb (4,082 kg) of towing capacity. Mileage at peak performance drain is 12 miles per US gallon (20 L/100 km; 14 mpg_{‑imp}). It comes in one trim level, with only key options such as: DVD entertainment system, 4WD/2WD, and a bench instead of captain chairs as the second row. Other features which came standard were a ten-speaker Bose system, DVD-based navigation system, leather trim for all seats, dual-climate control, 18-inch chrome alloy wheels, and an adaptive cruise control system. A precrash system was a unique feature in the market as well.

Starting with the 2006 model year, the third-row seats receive a 60/40 split.

Since the demise of the Q45 (which was priced above the QX56) after 2006, the QX56 was the most expensive Infiniti sold in North America and was Infiniti's only full-size vehicle.

In early 2007 for the 2008 model year, the Infiniti QX56 received a minor facelift which included a revised grille, a redesigned interior, a new intelligent key system, more standard equipment, new third-row seats that fold electronically and standard 20-inch chrome wheels. Introduced at the 2007 North American International Auto Show in January 2007, the facelifted model went on sale in April 2007.

After the 2010 model year, the QX56 and Armada no longer share the same body, as the first-generation Armada continued to be produced in the United States until the 2015 model year, while the second-generation QX56 switched to the body used by the Y62 Patrol.

== Second generation (Z62; 2011) ==
Second generation
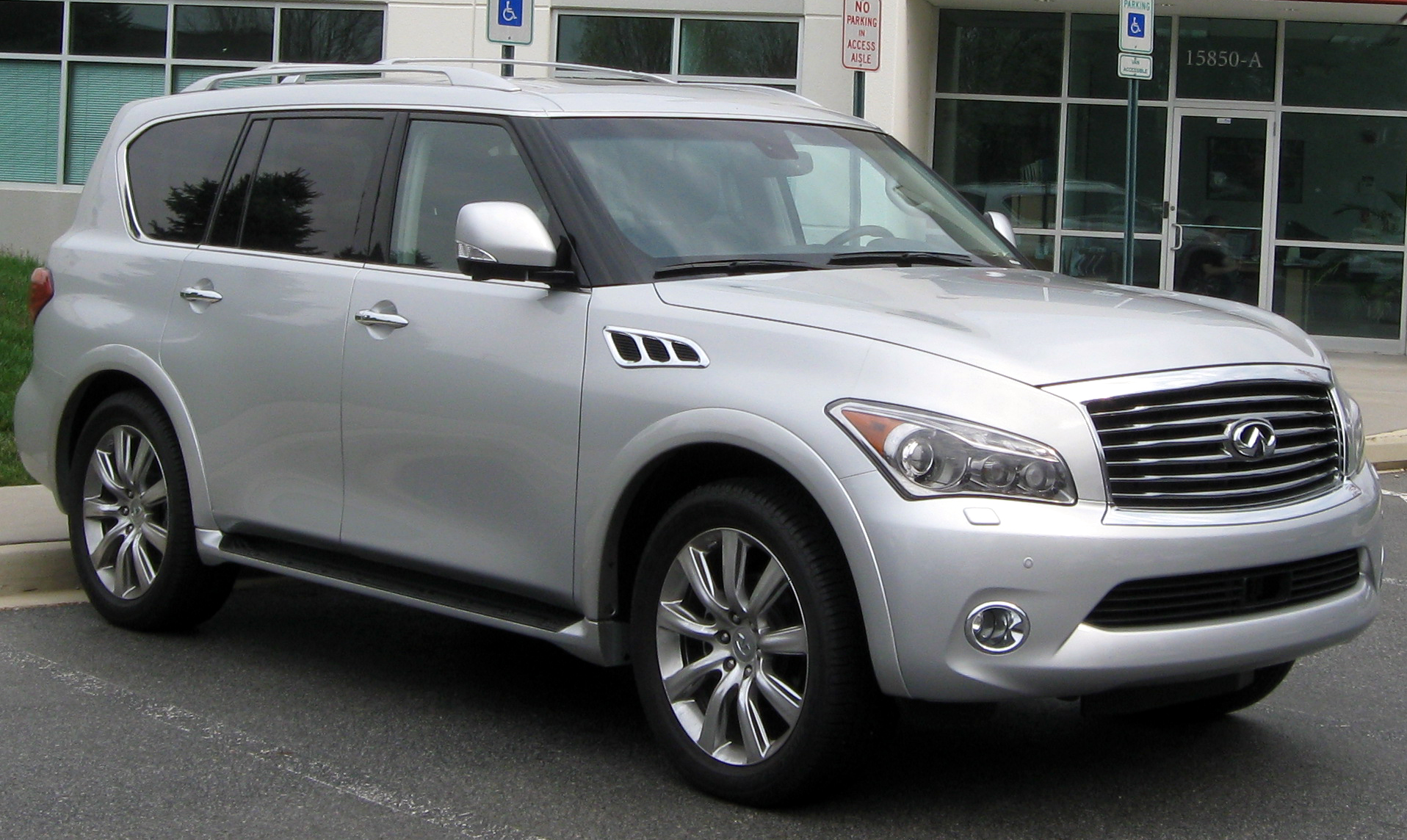
- 2011 Infiniti QX56

Overview
- Model code: Z62
- Production: April 2010 – June 2024
- Model years: 2011–2024
- Assembly: Japan: Kanda (Nissan Shatai Kyushu Plant); Russia: Saint Petersburg (2012–2014)
- Designer: Shinya Momokawa and Akihiro Sugita (2007)

Body and chassis
- Platform: Y62
- Related: Nissan Patrol (Y62); Nissan Armada (Y62); Nissan Titan (A61)

Powertrain
- Engine: Gasoline: 5.6 L VK56VD V8
- Transmission: 7-speed RE7R01B automatic

Dimensions
- Wheelbase: 3,075 mm (121.1 in)
- Length: 5,290 mm (208.3 in)
- Width: 2,047 mm (80.6 in)
- Height: 1,940 mm (76.4 in)
- Curb weight: 2,785 kg (6,140 lb)

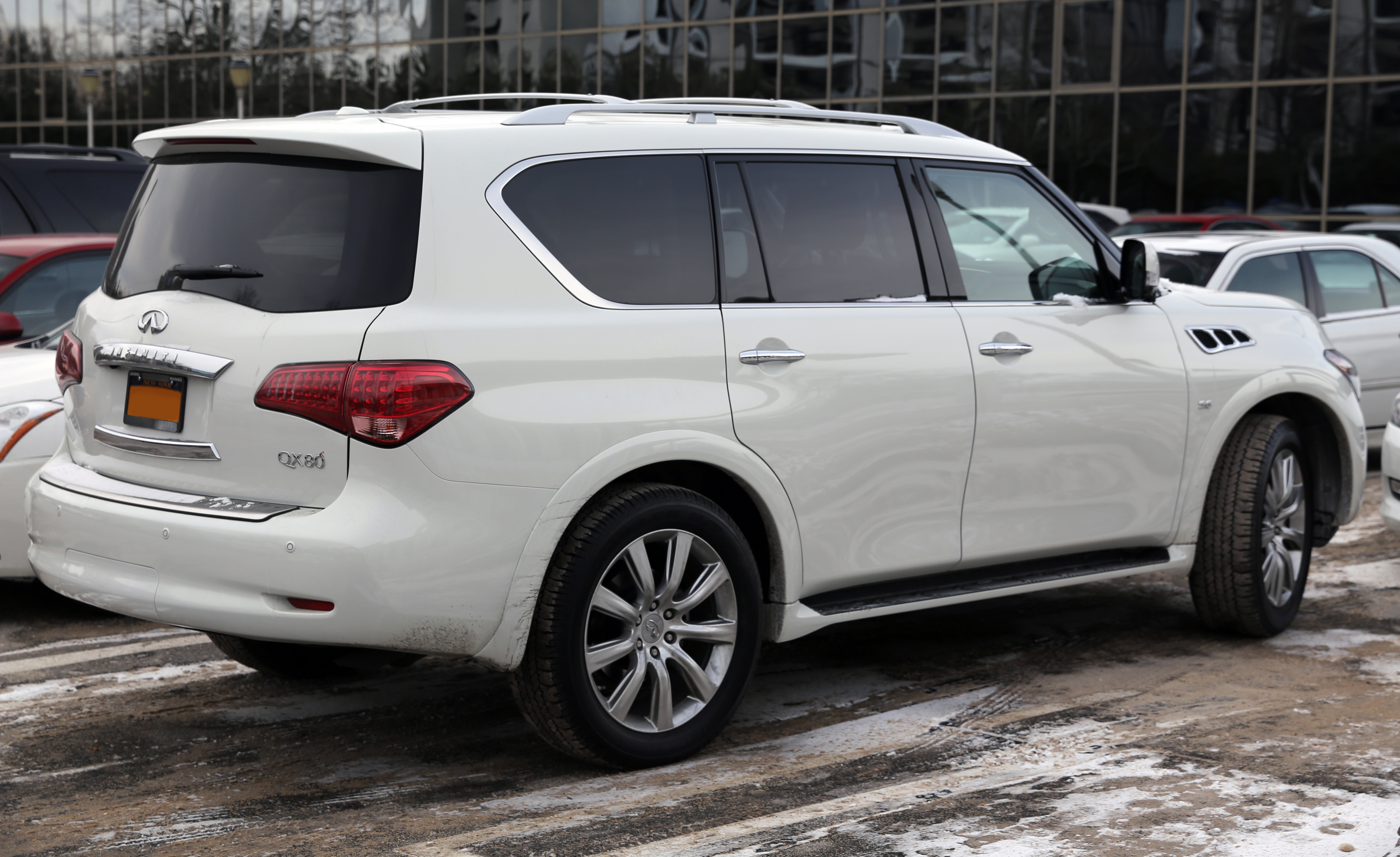
2014 Infiniti QX56 (US)

On 31 March 2010, Infiniti debuted the 2011 QX56 at the New York International Auto Show. No longer sharing a platform with the F-Alpha-based Nissan Armada, the QX56 shares the same body with the Y62 Patrol, which also marked the first time that a Patrol-based vehicle had been sold in North America since 1969.

Development of the Z62 QX56 began in 2006 following the concurrent Y62 Patrol program (since 2003), after Nissan management voted to move QX56 production back to Japan and separate from the Nissan Armada, after the JA60 QX56's production run concluded. By 2007, a styling proposal by Shinya Momokawa and Akihiro Sugita was approved by the board and frozen for production.

Although it was made by Nissan Shatai in Japan, the model was export-only, even if some models were later reverse-exported by Japanese grey importers, alongside many Infiniti-branded models, such as the FX (later QX70), G35 (Q60), and many others. It has been a popular parallel import vehicle for years, alongside the related Y62 Patrol, as its initial version and later facelifts are targeted as grey import vehicles. Japanese tuner Tommykaira also made a tuned version of the QX56, released in Japan in 2013, called 'QX56 PREMIUM'. Many QX56s (and later QX80s) are up for sale in Japan as grey imports in the country.

Compared to its predecessor, the Z62 QX56 is 1.4 inches longer and 1.1 inches wider. Most of the frame's body mass is made from high-tensile steel, but the QX manages to be more rugged with its body-on-frame concept. Both the front and rear feature independent suspension double wishbone suspensions combined with the new Hydraulic Body Motion Control System. The QX comes standard with 20-inch wheels, with 22-inch wheels available. 4WD versions have a four-setting terrain control which includes rock, snow, sand and dirt modes. This generation abandoned the disguised rear door handle design that was installed in the C-pillar.

The QX56 features a new 5.6-liter VK56VD V8 engine with direct injection and VVEL variable valve timing, also found in the Patrol, which is rated at 400 hp (298 kW) and 413 lb⋅ft (560 N⋅m) of torque. The more powerful engine helps give the QX56 an increased towing capacity of up to 8,500 lb (3,856 kg). The engine is paired to a seven-speed sequential-shift automatic transmission with an all-new 4WD system.

The QX56's interior design includes a number of the standard and optional luxury features in the 2010 Infiniti M, such as semi-aniline leather seats; tri-zone climate control; a Bose 2-channel, 13-speaker Premium Audio surround sound stereo system with hard drive memory storage; hard-drive based navigation system; an Around View Monitor system; and Infiniti Intuitive Park Assist, a parking assist feature which uses the around view monitor. Curtain Vent, new for this generation, directs air flow from the air conditioning system from above each side window down towards the floor.

The QX also features the updated Infiniti hard drive based navigation system with an eight-inch VGA display. Infiniti keyless SmartAccess with an "Intelligent Remote" key is standard along with 8 airbags including knee airbags for driver and front passenger as well as second-row side torso airbags, the Adaptive Front-lighting System (AFS) is standard, while the Pre-Collision System (PCS) and lane departure warning system are available options.

=== Corporate renaming (2013) ===
In 2013 for the 2014 model year, Infiniti renamed their entire product line, so the QX56 was rebadged as the QX80.

=== First facelift (2015) ===
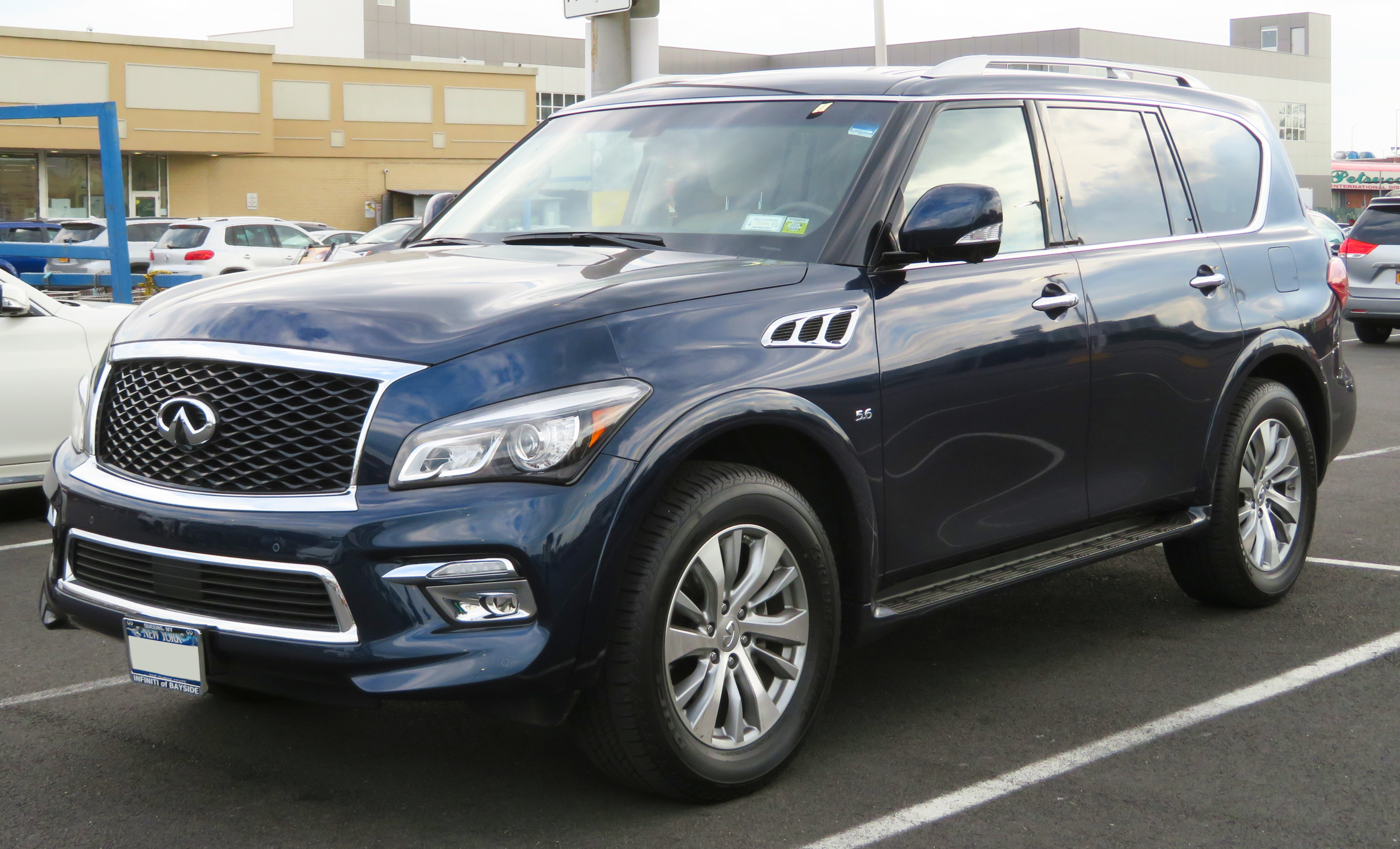

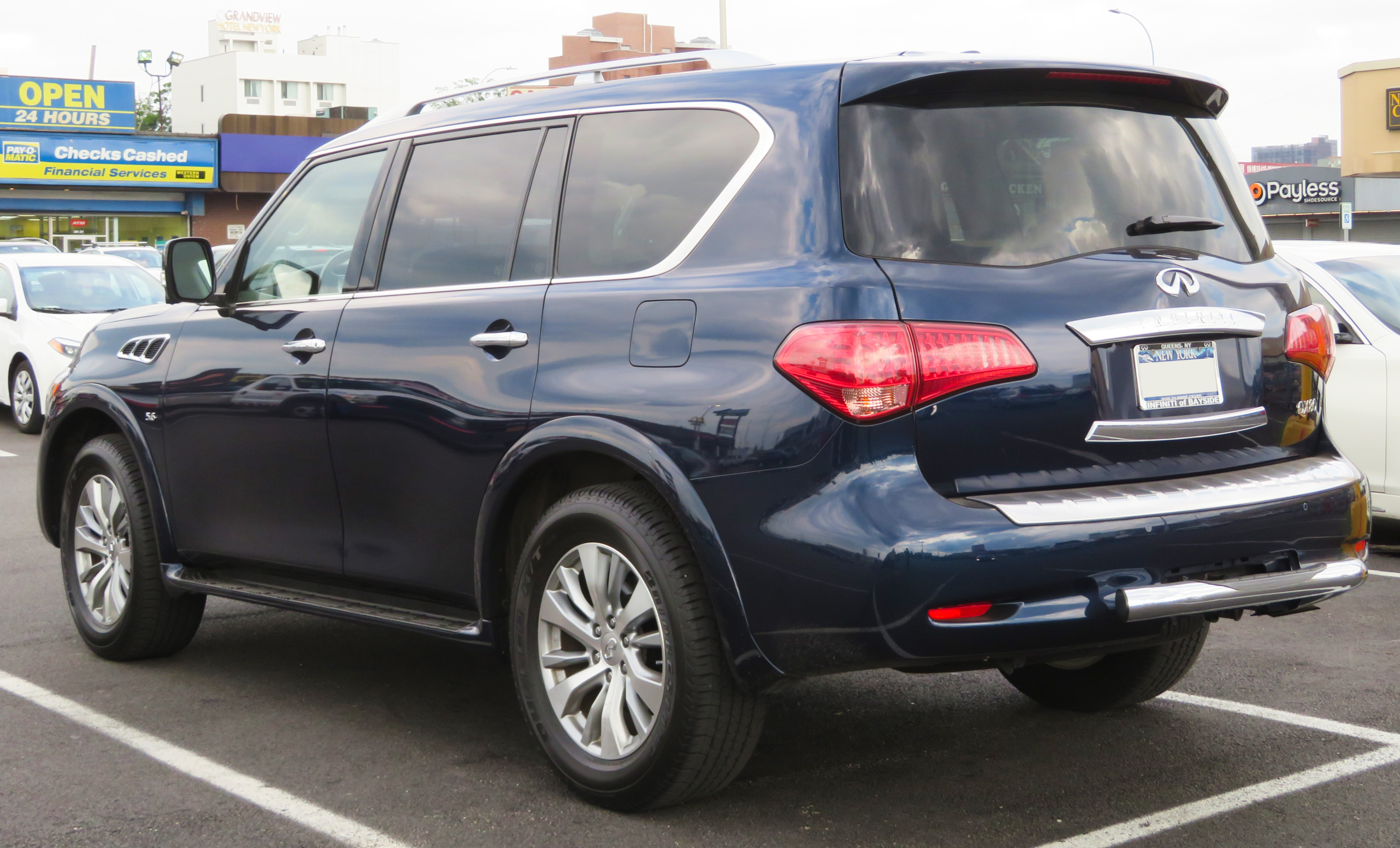
2017 Infiniti QX56 (US)

The 2015 model year QX80 arrived at the 2014 New York International Auto Show with a mid-generational refresh, receiving new headlights and taillights with new front and rear fascias, restyled bi-xenon HID projector headlamps with LED daytime running lights, front LED turn signals (located on front bumper with new LED fog lights), new wheel designs (including a new 22-inch forged-aluminum version), three new exterior colors, and a number of interior refinements. The new flagship trim level for 2015 is the QX80 Limited, which features all the QX80 packages and optional equipment available on other trim levels as standard, as well as standard Intelligent All Wheel Drive (AWD), and restyled LED clear lens taillights instead of the LED red lens taillights. However, the Limited trim level is not available with the second row bench seating which increases the passenger capability from 7 seats to 8 seats. Naoyuki Ohkoshi was responsible for exterior design work on the facelift QX80 in 2012.

As of 2017, the QX80 was available in the United States (including all US territories), Canada, Mexico, China (including Macau and Hong Kong), the GCC (Arab) markets, Russia, Ukraine, Armenia, Georgia, South Korea, Dominican Republic, Guam, Panama, Australia, New Zealand, Indonesia, Malaysia, Singapore, and Vietnam. A RHD version was available in some markets as part of the facelift in late 2014.

In late 2016, the 2017 Armada was released and it switched to the Y62 Patrol body, so the Armada is once again a mechanical twin of the QX80 (formerly QX56) since the 2010 model years.

=== Second facelift (2018) ===
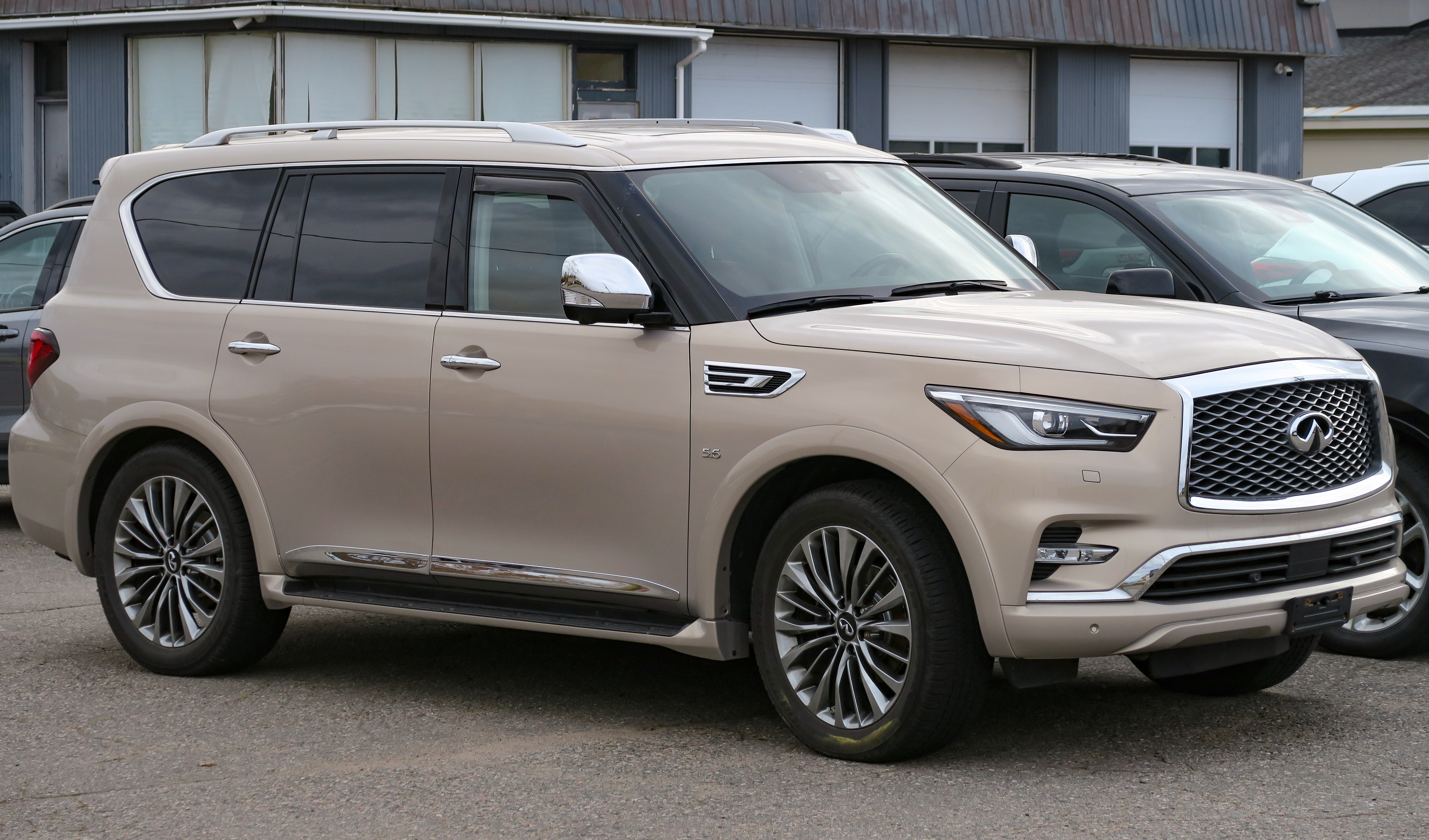

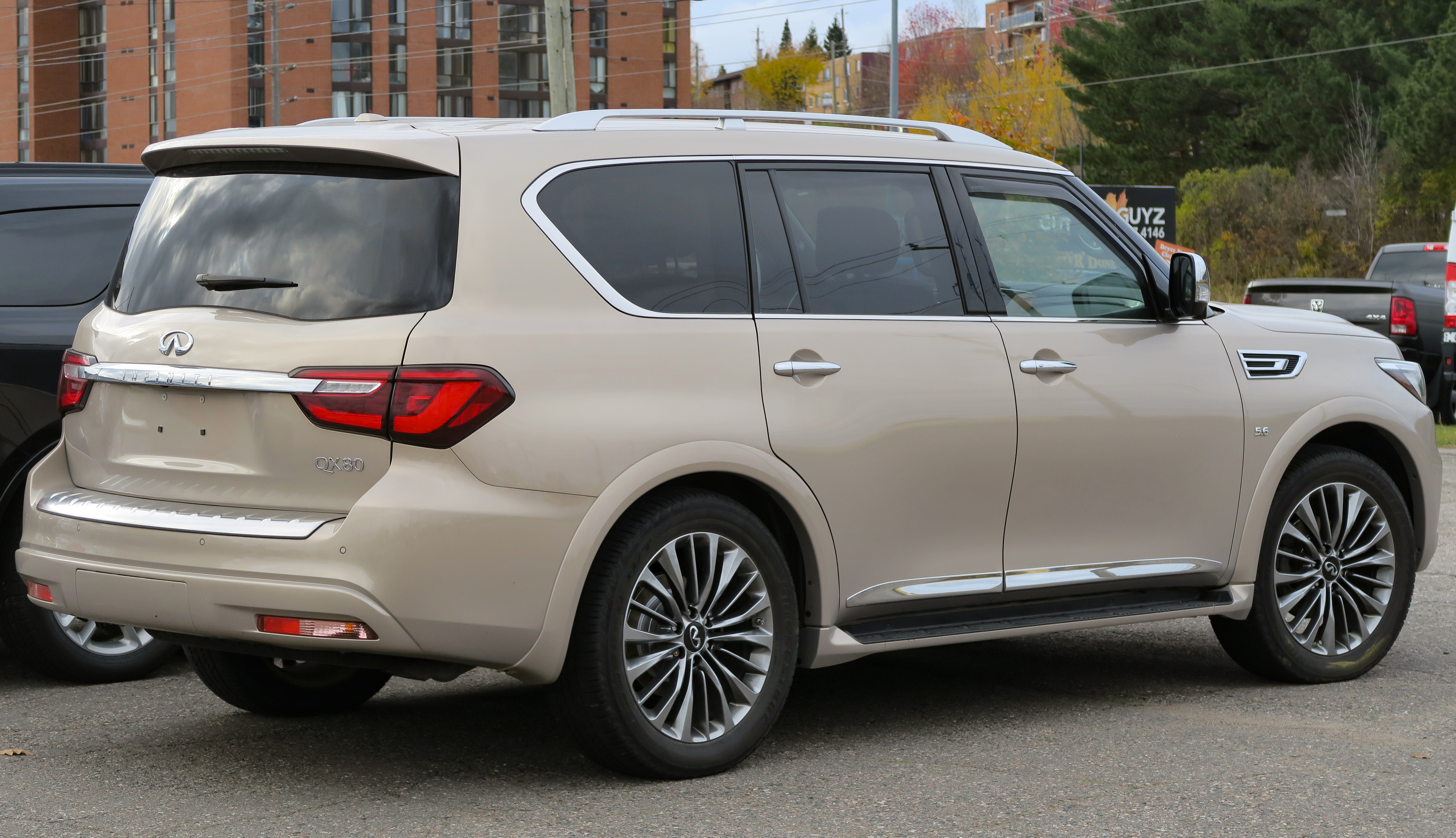
2019 Infiniti QX80 (Canada)

The QX80 Monograph Concept was a design study that previewed a significant second facelift to QX80 for the 2018 model year, launched in December 2017. It retained its 5.6-liter V8 engine and basic architecture. The QX80 Monograph was unveiled at the 2017 New York International Auto Show. The revised QX80 debuted at the Dubai International Motor Show, on 14 November 2017. The facelift has redesigned grille, hood, new LED headlamps, and full LED taillamps with bumper-installed rear turn signal lights.

In August 2021 for the 2022 model year, Infiniti updated the QX80 featuring an all-new infotainment system and a 12.3 touchscreen display, replacing the dated two-screen setup. The QX80 also features new climate control switches, wireless charging, Android Auto and Apple CarPlay with navigation standard is included with the QX80 and Infiniti's InTouch connected services. The interior revision is almost identical to the related Armada with its 2021 refresh.

== Third generation (Z63; 2024) ==
Third generation
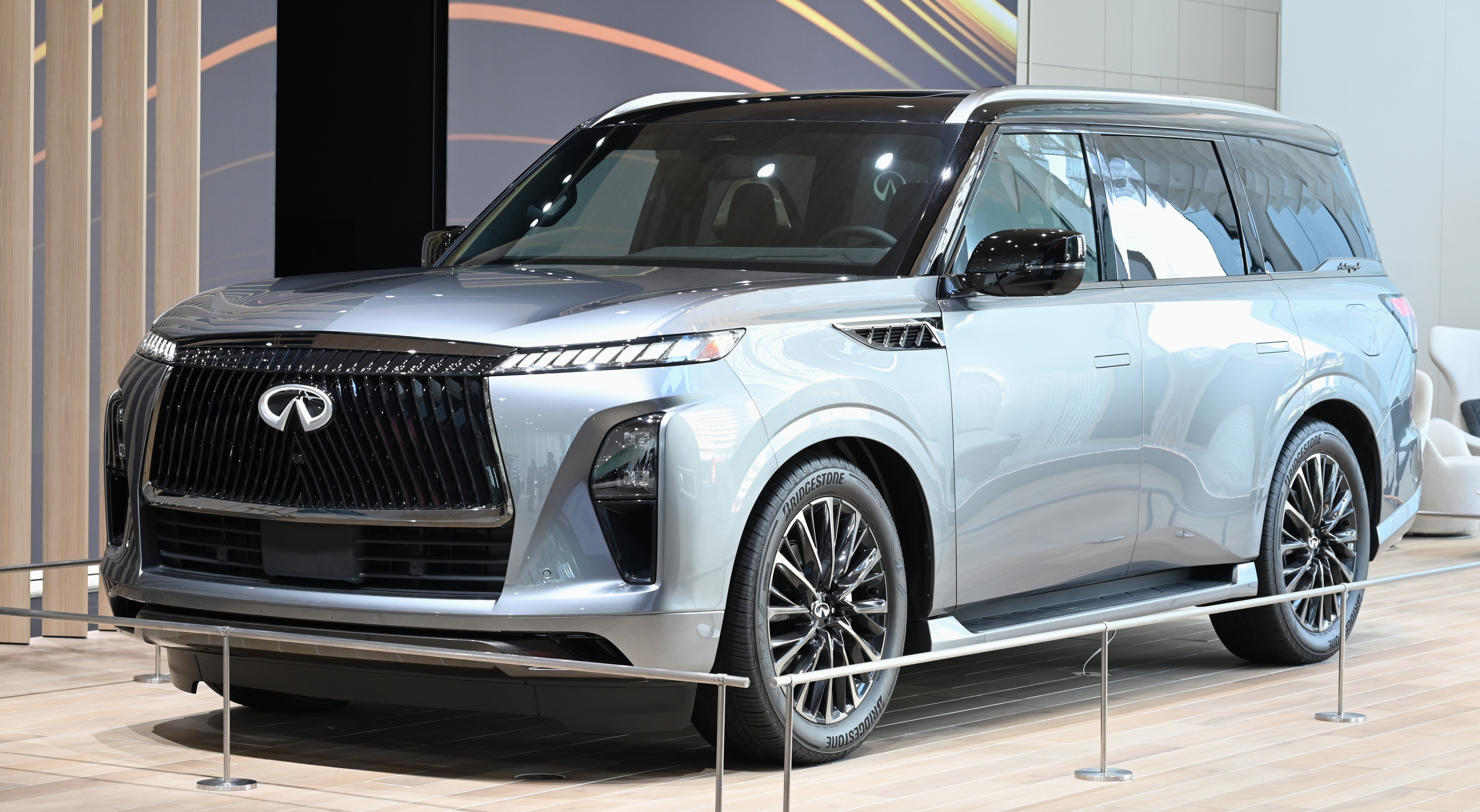
- 2024 Infiniti QX80 Autograph

Overview
- Model code: Z63
- Production: August 2024 – present
- Model years: 2025–present
- Assembly: Japan: Kanda (Nissan Shatai Kyushu Plant)

Body and chassis
- Related: Nissan Patrol/Armada (Y63)

Powertrain
- Engine: Gasoline: 3.5 L VR35DDTT twin-turbo V6
- Power output: 450 hp (336 kW; 456 PS)
- Transmission: 9-speed automatic

Dimensions
- Wheelbase: 3,073 mm (121.0 in)
- Length: 5,364 mm (211.2 in)
- Width: 2,116 mm (83.3 in)
- Height: 1,946 mm (76.6 in)

The Z63 series QX80 was previewed as the QX Monograph Concept on 17 August 2023. The production model was teased on 27 February 2024, and was revealed on 20 March 2024 for the 2025 model year with four trim levels available at launch: Pure, Luxe, Sensory and Autograph.

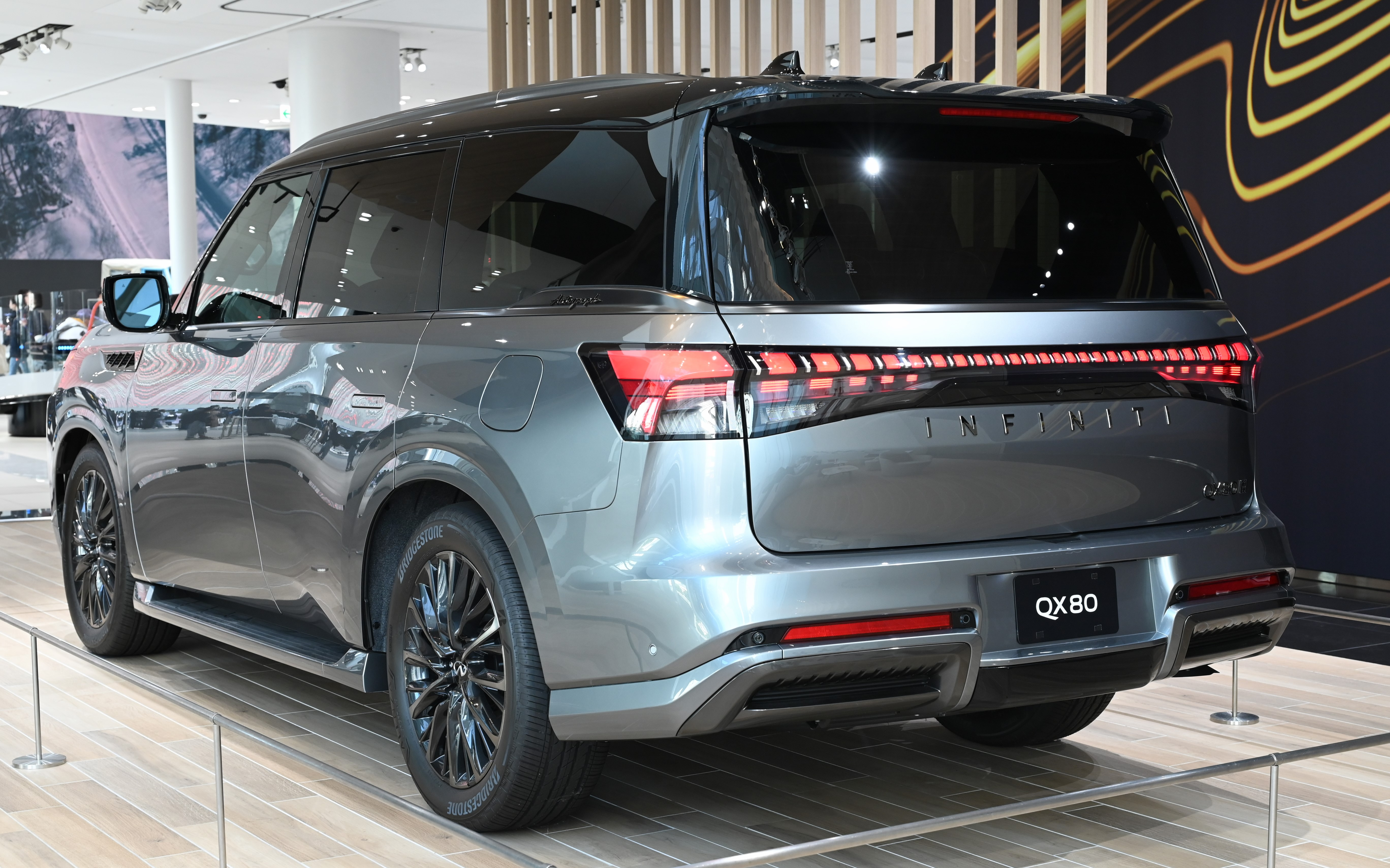
Rear view

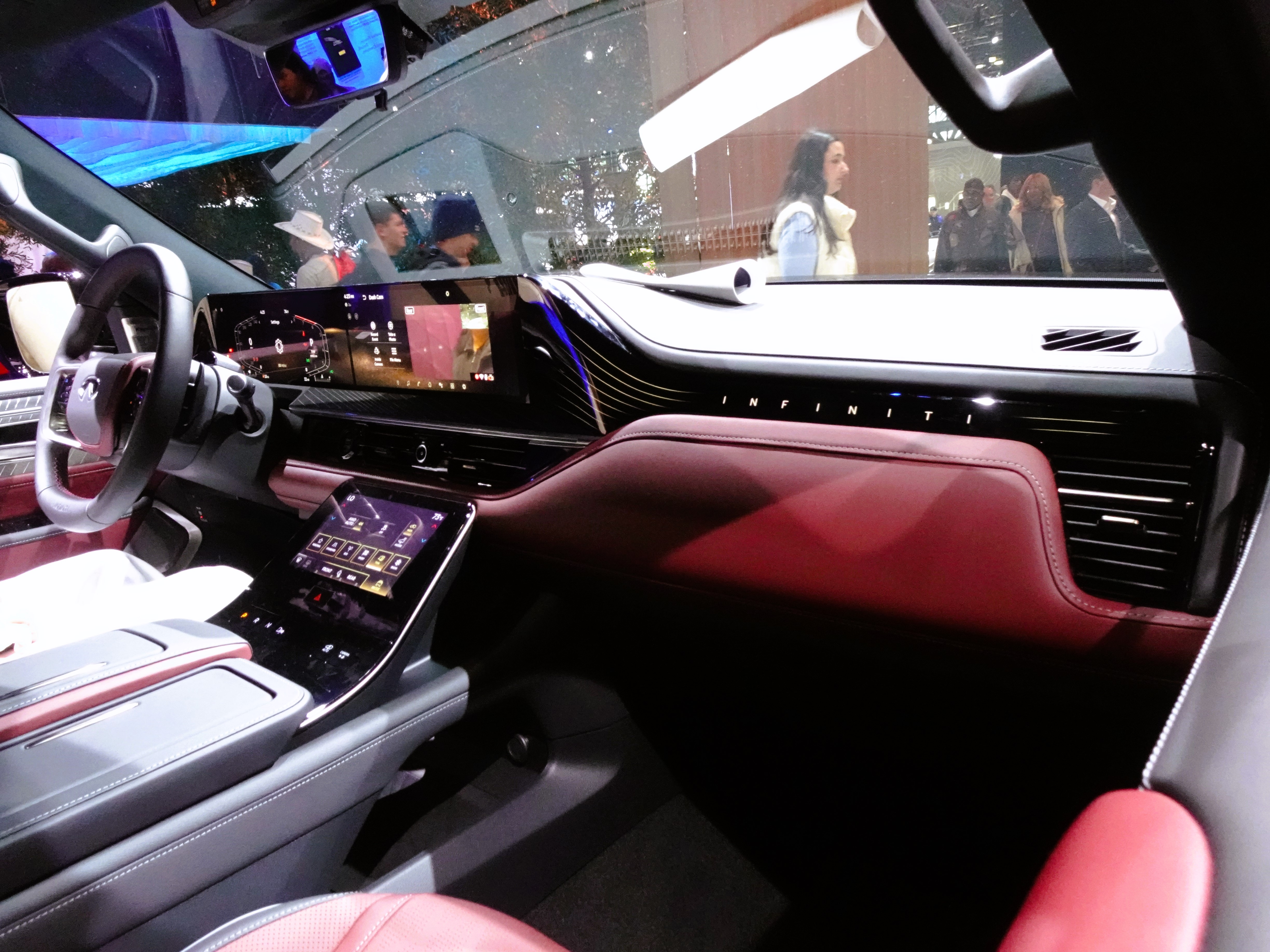
Interior

=== Overview ===
The exterior of the production version is largely inspired by the QX Monograph Concept. The third generation QX80 is the first to use the brand's "Artistry in Motion" design language. There is a signature double arch grille inspired by organic shapes of the bamboo forest, multi-element LED daytime running lights with a bamboo forest motif, an illuminated Infiniti logo with a 3D-effect, flushed door handles, blacked-out door pillars and a full-width LED taillight bar that features over 300 LEDs. The interior has two 14.3-inch displays for the driver's digital instrument cluster and the main Infiniti InTouch infotainment system with Google built-in. Below the infotainment system, is an additional 9-inch touchscreen display (that uses haptic feedback) for the climate controls, front seat cooling and heating functions and the drive mode selection. Massaging seats are also available. The automatic transmission is operated by push buttons instead of traditional gear lever. Other interior features are a 64-color Personalized Ambient Lighting with light pipes on the dashboard and door panels, Biometric Cooling for the second-row seats, colored heads-up display, heated third row seats, Journey Diary functionality which can save photo and video footage from the front and in-car cameras, and a Klipsch audio system with speakers in the front headrests.

The QX80 debuts a world’s first feature called Front Wide View, which provides wide 170-degree camera views on the side of vehicle on both 14.3 in (36 cm) screens allows for around parked vehicles or corners in tight areas.

All QX80 models are powered by a 3.5-liter twin-turbocharged V6 gasoline engine producing 450 hp (336 kW) and 516 lb⋅ft (700 N⋅m) of torque paired with a 9-speed automatic transmission, with the choice between RWD and an Infiniti All-mode 4WD system.

The QX80 was launched in the Middle Eastern markets on 8 November 2024.

Although built in Japan for export, several Z63 QX80s are re-imported back into Japan and sold as grey imports.

=== Safety ===
The 2025 model year QX80 was awarded "Top Safety Pick+" by IIHS. As standard, QX80 includes a list of advanced driving-assistance systems such as Automatic Emergency Braking with Pedestrian Detection, Blind Spot Intervention, Blind Spot Warning, Lane Departure Prevention, Predictive Forward Collision Warning and Rear Cross Traffic Alert.

IIHS scores (2025 model year)
| Small overlap front | Good |
| Moderate overlap front (original test) | Good |
| Moderate overlap front (updated test) | Good |
| Side (updated test) | Good |
| Headlights | Good |
| Front crash prevention: vehicle-to-pedestrian | Superior |
| Front crash prevention: vehicle-to-pedestrian | Superior |
| Seatbelt reminders | Good |

== Sales ==
| Year | U.S. | Canada | China |
|---|---|---|---|
| 2004 | 13,136 | N/A | |
| 2005 | 14,711 | N/A | |
| 2006 | 11,694 | N/A | |
| 2007 | 12,288 | N/A | |
| 2008 | 7,657 | N/A | |
| 2009 | 6,440 | N/A | |
| 2010 | 11,918 | N/A | |
| 2011 | 13,428 | N/A | |
| 2012 | 15,310 | N/A | |
| 2013 | 13,148 | 128 | |
| 2014 | 12,935 | 521 | |
| 2015 | 15,646 | 727 | |
| 2016 | 16,772 | 1,063 | |
| 2017 | 17,881 | 957 | |
| 2018 | 19,207 | 1,129 | |
| 2019 | 19,113 | 935 | |
| 2020 | 16,125 | 740 | |
| 2021 | 12,572 | 847 | |
| 2022 | 7,206 | | |
| 2023 | 12,696 | 841 | 34 |
| 2024 | 10,339 | 946 | 10 |
| 2025 | 13,590 | 1,053 | 42 |
