= Hydraulic Body Motion Control System =

The Hydraulic Body Motion Control System (HBMC) technology was employed initially in the Nissan Patrol, and subsequently the Infiniti QX. The system was invented and developed by Nissan Motors and was tested on the Nissan Patrol in the Middle East. The system helps reduce body lean while turning for a more comfortable ride. Utilizing hydraulic cylinders located at the shock absorbers (connected via cross piping and two accumulators), it adjusts roll stiffness by allowing transfer of fluid between the left and right sides of the vehicle through passive weight transfer during normal driving. It also helps reduce bump shock by setting bounce and roll damping forces separately. In off-road conditions, HBMC activates when it senses that a wheel has dropped.

The hydraulic Body Motion Control System was first available on the new model year 2010 Nissan Patrol, a sport utility vehicle that is sold worldwide, and shares a platform with the Infiniti QX. The system was also introduced in similar form on the 2011 Infiniti QX. An earlier version of the system was installed in the Nissan President and Infiniti Q45 called Full Active Suspension from 1990-2002.

== System overview ==
Two hydraulic systems connected by cross-link hydraulic pipes to the 4-wheel independent suspension's hydraulic cylinders absorb road bumps and help reduce body lean when cornering. This helps minimize fluctuation of view of those on board and provides a more comfortable ride. Unlike other similar systems, this does not need a power source, so there is no trade-off with fuel economy.

== Cornering ==
Fluid from the two outside wheel hydraulic cylinders flows to the accumulator to raise the suspension's roll stiffness. This counteracts centrifugal force, reducing the degree of sinking on the vehicle's outer side and helps to minimize passenger fluctuation of view.

== Rough Road and Off-Road Driving ==
The suspension for each wheel rises or drops according to road conditions, smoothly absorbing the vibrations caused by off-road bumps and holes.

== Vehicles ==
Models that have adopted the Hydraulic Body Motion Control Suspension System to date, listed by model year:

- 2010 Nissan Patrol
- 2011 Infiniti QX
