= Nissan Armada =

Full-size SUV

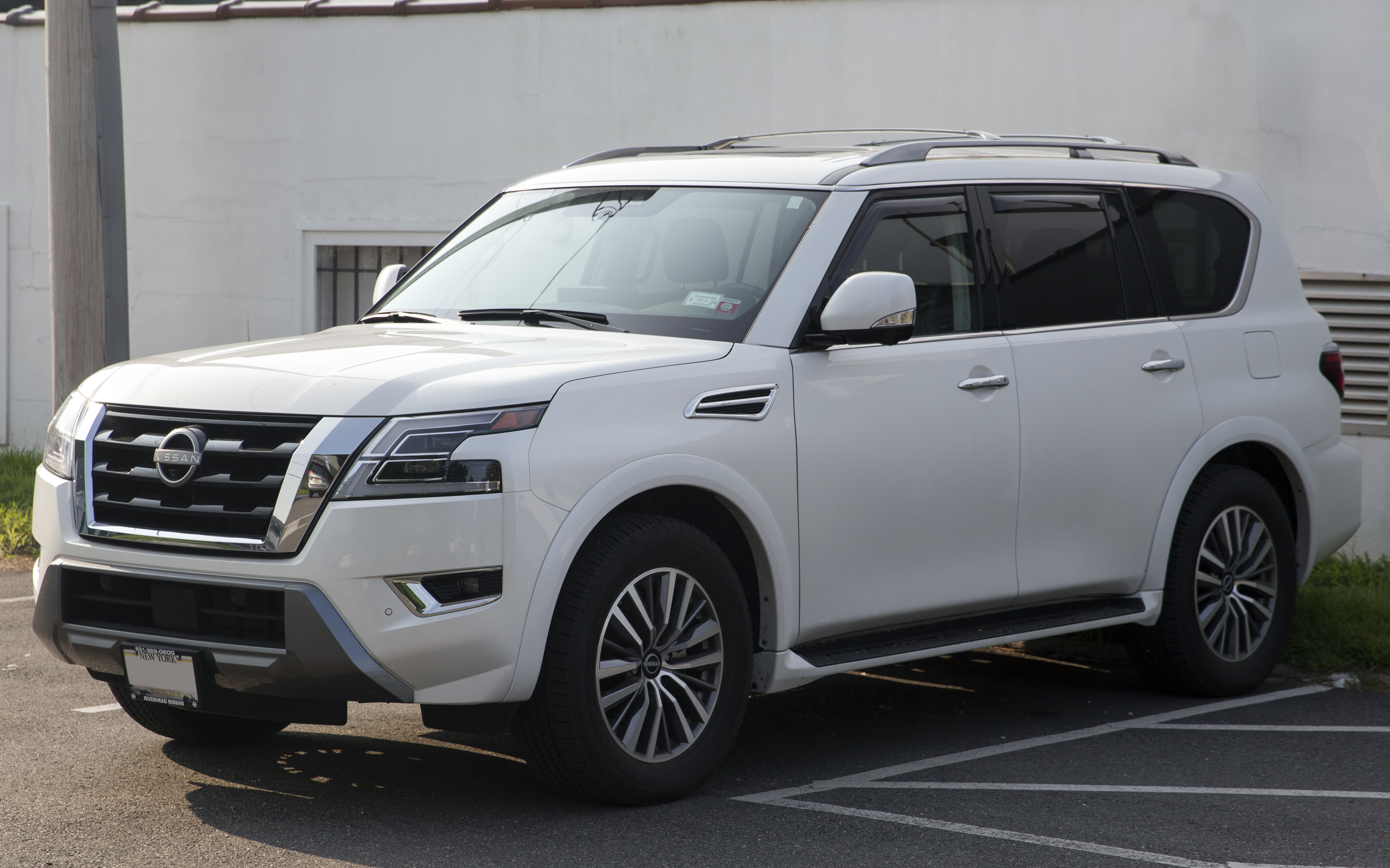
- 2023 Nissan Armada SL (Y62, US)

Overview
- Manufacturer: Nissan
- Also called: Nissan Pathfinder Armada (2003–2004); Nissan Patrol (2016–present)
- Production: 2003–present
- Model years: 2004–present

Body and chassis
- Class: Full-size SUV
- Body style: 5-door SUV
- Layout: Front-engine, rear-wheel-drive or four-wheel-drive
- Chassis: Body-on-frame

The Nissan Armada (originally badged as the Nissan Pathfinder Armada) is a full-size SUV manufactured by Nissan for the North American market, since 2003 for the 2004 model year.

From 2003 to 2015, the first-generation Armada was assembled in Canton, Mississippi based on the Nissan Titan. From mid-2016 onwards, the second-generation Armada is built in Kanda, Kyushu, Japan. It shares the same platform as the Nissan Patrol, with American-specific modifications, and went on sale in mid-2016 as a 2017 model. A luxury version of the Armada has been sold as the Infiniti QX80 (originally QX56).

== First generation (TA60; 2003) ==
First generation
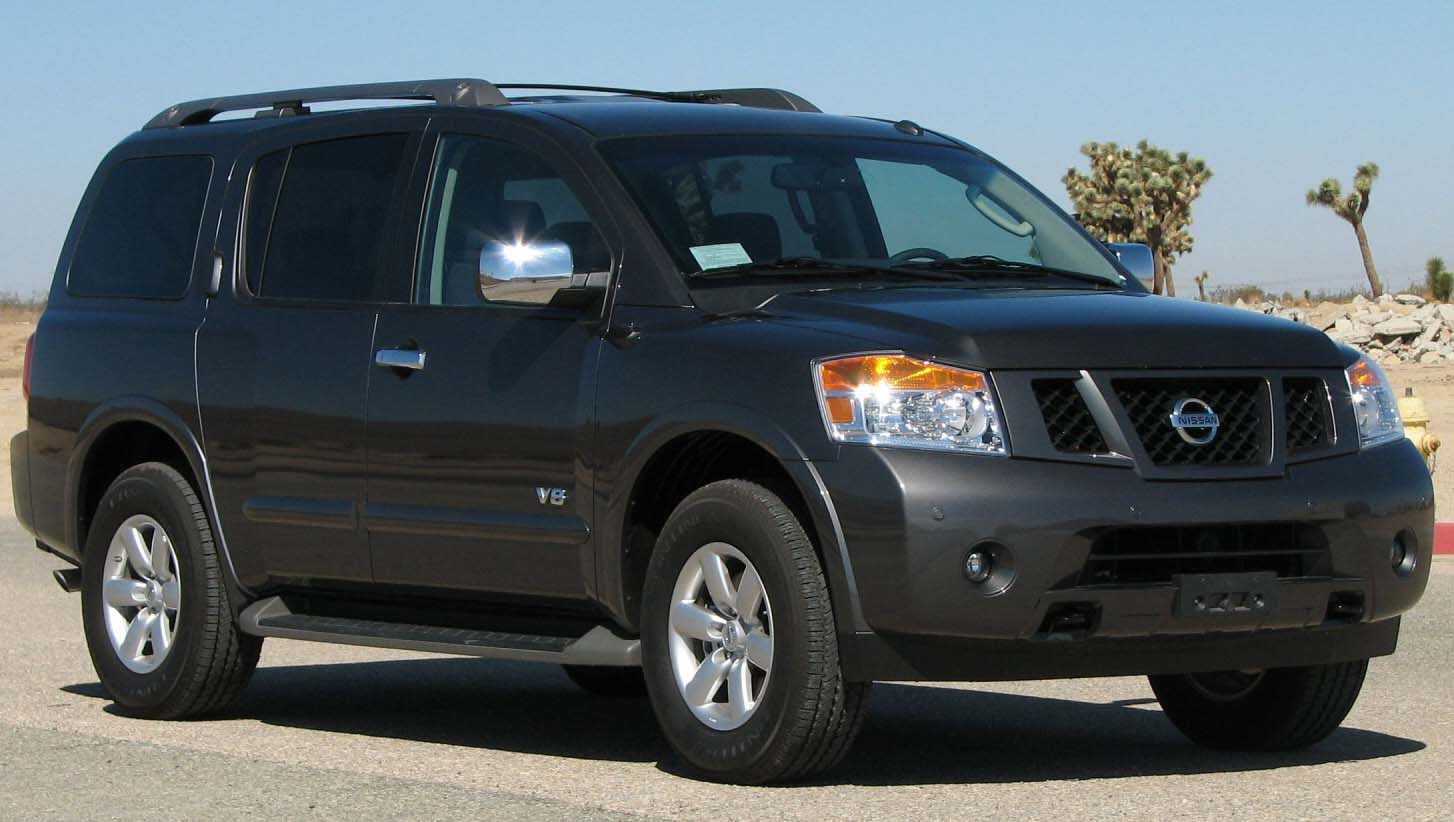
- 2008 Nissan Armada

Overview
- Model code: TA60
- Also called: Nissan Pathfinder Armada (2003–2004); Infiniti QX56 (2004–2010)
- Production: August 2003 – 2015
- Model years: 2004–2015
- Assembly: United States: Canton, Mississippi (Nissan USA)
- Designer: Toshio Yamashita, Diane Allen, Giovanny Arroba (2001)

Body and chassis
- Platform: Nissan F-Alpha platform
- Related: Nissan Titan; Nissan Frontier; Nissan Xterra; Nissan Pathfinder

Powertrain
- Engine: Gasoline: 5.6 L VK56DE V8
- Transmission: 5-speed RE5R05A automatic

Dimensions
- Wheelbase: 123.2 in (3,129 mm)
- Length: 2003–2007: 206.9 in (5,255 mm); 2007–2015: 207.7 in (5,276 mm)
- Width: 2003–2007: 78.8 in (2,002 mm); 2007–2015: 79.3 in (2,014 mm)
- Height: 2003–2007: 78.7 in (1,999 mm); 2007–2015 2WD: 77.2 in (1,961 mm); 2007–2015 4WD: 78.0 in (1,981 mm)

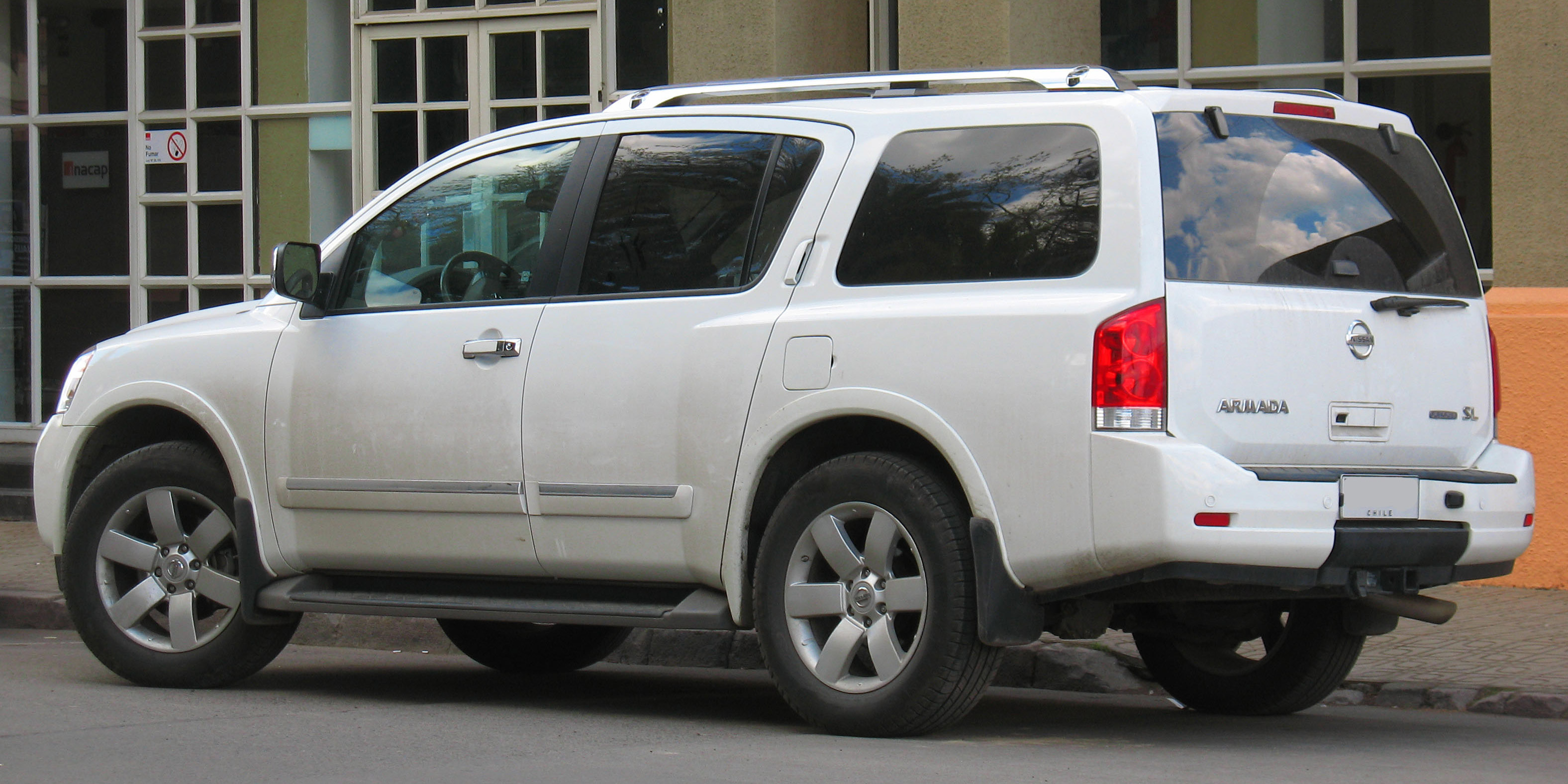
Rear view

The 2004 model Pathfinder Armada was unveiled on April 17, 2003, at the New York International Auto Show. Developed under Carlos Ghosn's NRP (Nissan Revival Plan), development took place from September 1999 to 2003 under lead designers Shiro Nakamura and Diane Allen and chief engineers Yuzo Sakita and Larry Dominique. In January 2001, a final exterior design by Giovanny Arroba had been approved by Sakita, Allen, Nakamura, and Nissan executive management, with the final design freeze being completed in July 2001. It is assigned the platform code TA60.

Prototypes based on the Y61 Patrol were hand-assembled as mules from 2001, with the first TA60-specific prototypes being completed and sent to testing in early 2002. Design patents were filed in 2003, with production starting on August 14, 2003, and going on sale on October 1, 2003.

The Armada had a 5.6 L VK56DE V8 that produced 305 hp (227 kW) and 385 lb⋅ft (522 N⋅m) of torque. This was mated to a 5-speed automatic transmission, and the Armada had a choice of either rear-wheel drive or four-wheel drive. Some Armadas are capable of using E85. It has a towing capacity of up to 9,000 lb (4,000 kg).

The rear door handles are installed on the "C" pillar as part of a Nissan design tradition that started with the 1986 Nissan Pathfinder. When the four-door Pathfinder was introduced, Nissan chose to conceal the door handles as part of the "C" pillar trim to visually make it appear like a two-door truck with a camper shell, with conventional door handles on the front doors.

The switch to the Armada name occurred in September 2004 for the 2005 model year, where it received new badges without "Pathfinder." The 2005 model year also included a backup camera. (Note: The 2005-2015 model years of some first generation Armadas continued to be produced without backup cameras.)

Starting with the 2006 model year, the third-row seats received a 60/40 split.

=== 2008 refresh ===
A facelift was designed through 2005 and introduced in early 2007 for the 2008 model year.

The updated VK56DE V8 engine produces 317 hp (236 kW) and 385 lb⋅ft (522 N⋅m) of torque with an improved towing capacity of up to 9,100 lb (4,128 kg) when equipped with the towing package.

Standard features included an 8-inch infotainment screen system, an updated interior, a new front and rear fascia, new headlamp and fog lamp designs, a twist knob ignition switch for the Intelligent Key System, (Note: The 2008-2015 model years of some first generation Armadas continued to be equipped with traditional ignition switches.) a new one-piece roof rack design, and third-row seats that fold electronically. (Note: The 2008-2015 model years of some first generation Armadas continued to be produced with manual folding third row seats.)

The latest Nissan Armada Platinum edition features a 9.3 GB hard drive for storing music, and a CF (Compact Flash) memory card reader.

For the 2011 model year, the Armada removed the SE and Off-Road trim levels and moved to a tiered system: SV (base trim), SL (middle trim), and Platinum (top trim). Nissan discontinued the use of the Armada platform for the Infiniti QX56 produced in Japan.

The 2013 model year added Bluetooth and satellite radio as standard on all models, Platinum Reserve trim package and an updated steering wheel. Navigation added NavWeather capability, Zagat Survey, Bluetooth audio streaming, one USB port, and a 40 GB disk drive. The Nissan DVD Entertainment System mounted screens in the back of the front head restraints.

The 2015 model year updated interior door panels.

The Nissan Armada (TA60) was sold in the United States (including all US territories), Canada, Mexico, and the Middle East in left-hand-drive only.

== Second generation (Y62; 2017) ==
Second generation
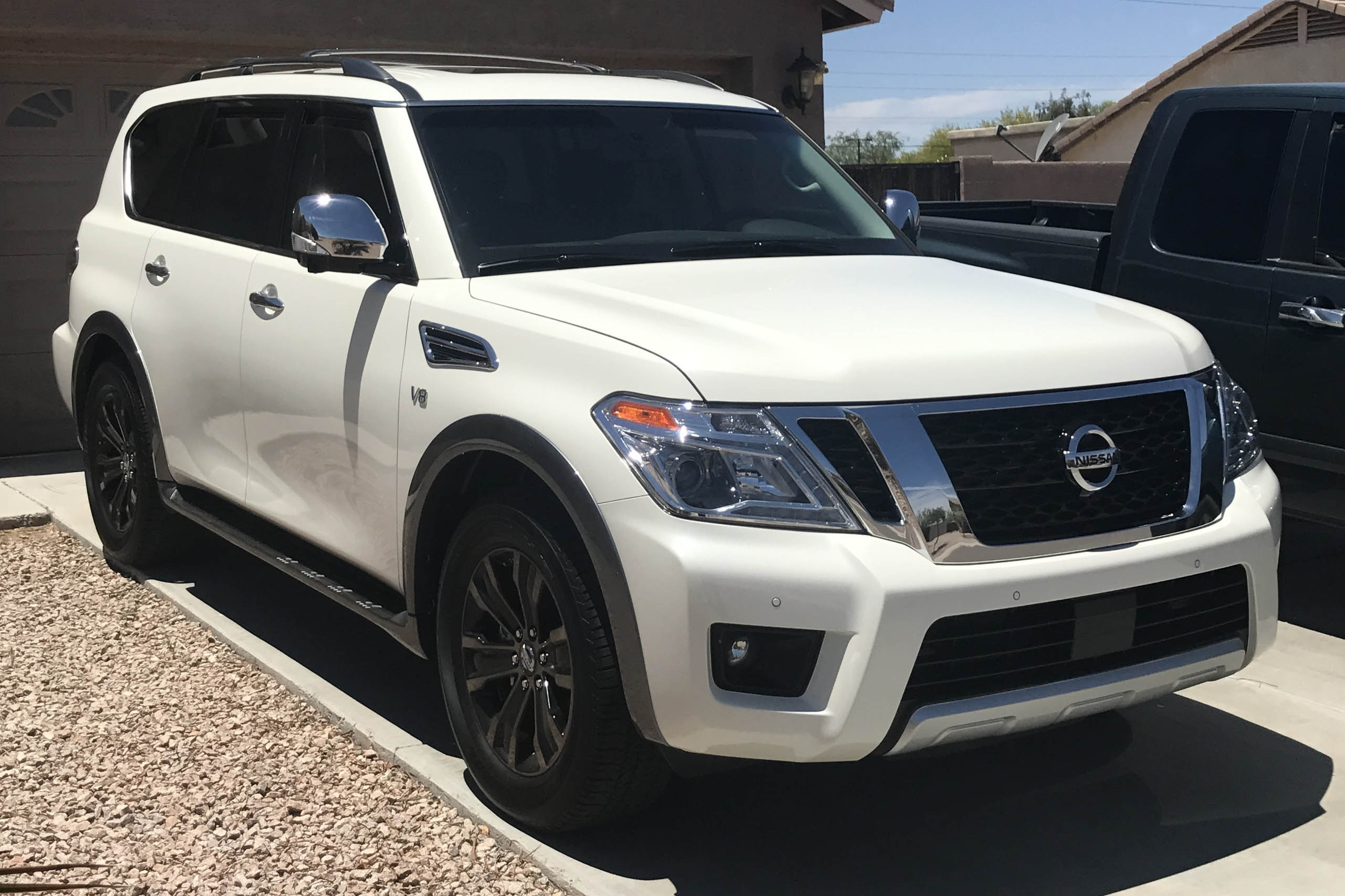
- 2017 Armada Platinum

Overview
- Model code: Y62
- Also called: Nissan Patrol
- Production: June 2016 – November 2024
- Model years: 2017–2024
- Assembly: Japan: Kanda, Fukuoka (Nissan Shatai Plant)
- Designer: Taisuke Nakamura, Shinya Momokawa, Minoru Yoshida, Sugita Akihiro

Body and chassis
- Platform: Y62

Powertrain
- Engine: Gasoline: 5.6 L VK56VD V8
- Transmission: 7-speed RE7R01B automatic

Dimensions
- Wheelbase: 3,075 mm (121.1 in)
- Length: 5,305 mm (208.9 in)
- Width: 2,030 mm (79.9 in)
- Height: 1,925 mm (75.8 in)

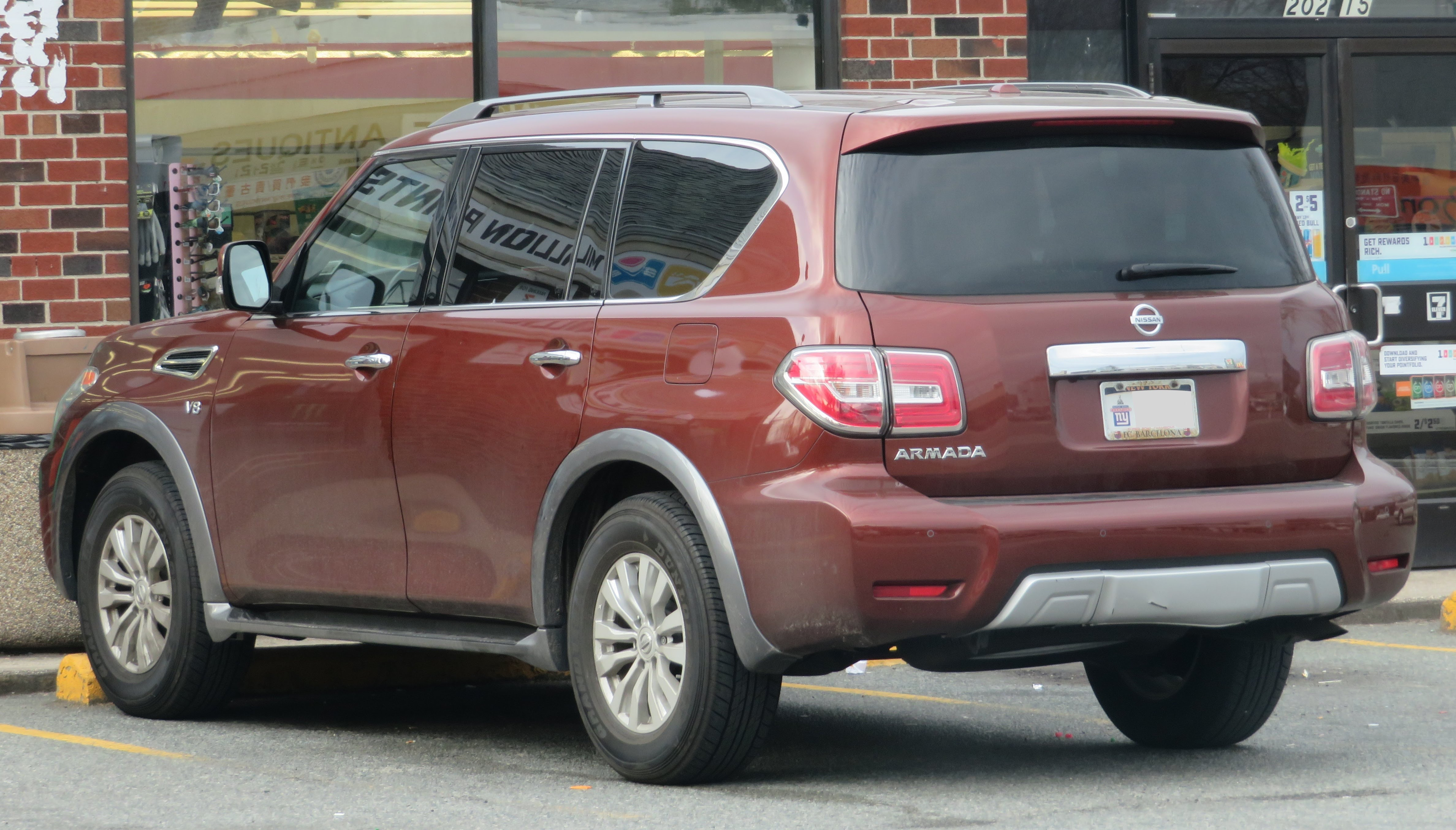
Rear view

Nissan unveiled the second-generation Armada at the 2016 Chicago Auto Show, and it went on sale in August 2016 as a 2017 model. This version is based on the Nissan Patrol (Y62), the platform also used for the Infiniti QX80. Moving the Armada and Patrol to the same global platform, instead of the Armada sharing the platform of the American-built Titan, saves considerable development cost. The Armada grew in length and width, but the wheelbase and height were moderately reduced.

The engine was upgraded to the VK56VD Endurance V8, increasing horsepower from 317 to 390 hp (236 to 291 kW; 321 to 395 PS) at 5200 rpm and torque from 385 to 394 lb⋅ft (522 to 534 N⋅m; 53.2 to 54.5 kg⋅m) at 4000 rpm. In addition to the Endurance V8, a seven-speed transmission was introduced to improve fuel economy and acceleration. The exterior moderately differs from the updated Patrol, which was introduced in early 2014. As with the previous generation, the Armada continued to offer 2WD and 4WD and is available in SV, SL, and Platinum trims. It has been described as a large-sized, low-volume, but high-profit model for Nissan.

=== 2021 refresh ===
An updated version of the Nissan Armada was revealed in December 2020. The front end was redesigned, with a larger grille and C-shaped LED headlights along with two new exterior colors. The taillights were also redesigned and are LED. Inside, the center console was redesigned, with a wider infotainment screen with wireless Apple CarPlay and wired Android Auto along with a wireless smartphone charger standard. Nissan's "Safety Shield 360" became standard. Trim levels and powertrain remained the same with the SV getting leatherette seating with silky carbon trim, SL retaining leather-appointed seating with wood-tone trim and new 20-inch wheels, and the top-of-the-line Platinum getting new quilted leather-appointed seating with birdseye maple wood tone trim, along with new 22-inch wheels. The base S will be available at a later date, although the 5.6 L V8 gained 10 horsepower (7 kW; 10 PS) and 19 pound-feet (26 N⋅m) of torque. A Midnight Edition, which treats the exterior to an under-the-radar, blacked-out color scheme, was also added. The updated Armada went on sale in North America in late January 2021.

For the 2022 model year, one-touch power-folding third row seats were added as standard equipment for the Armada Platinum.

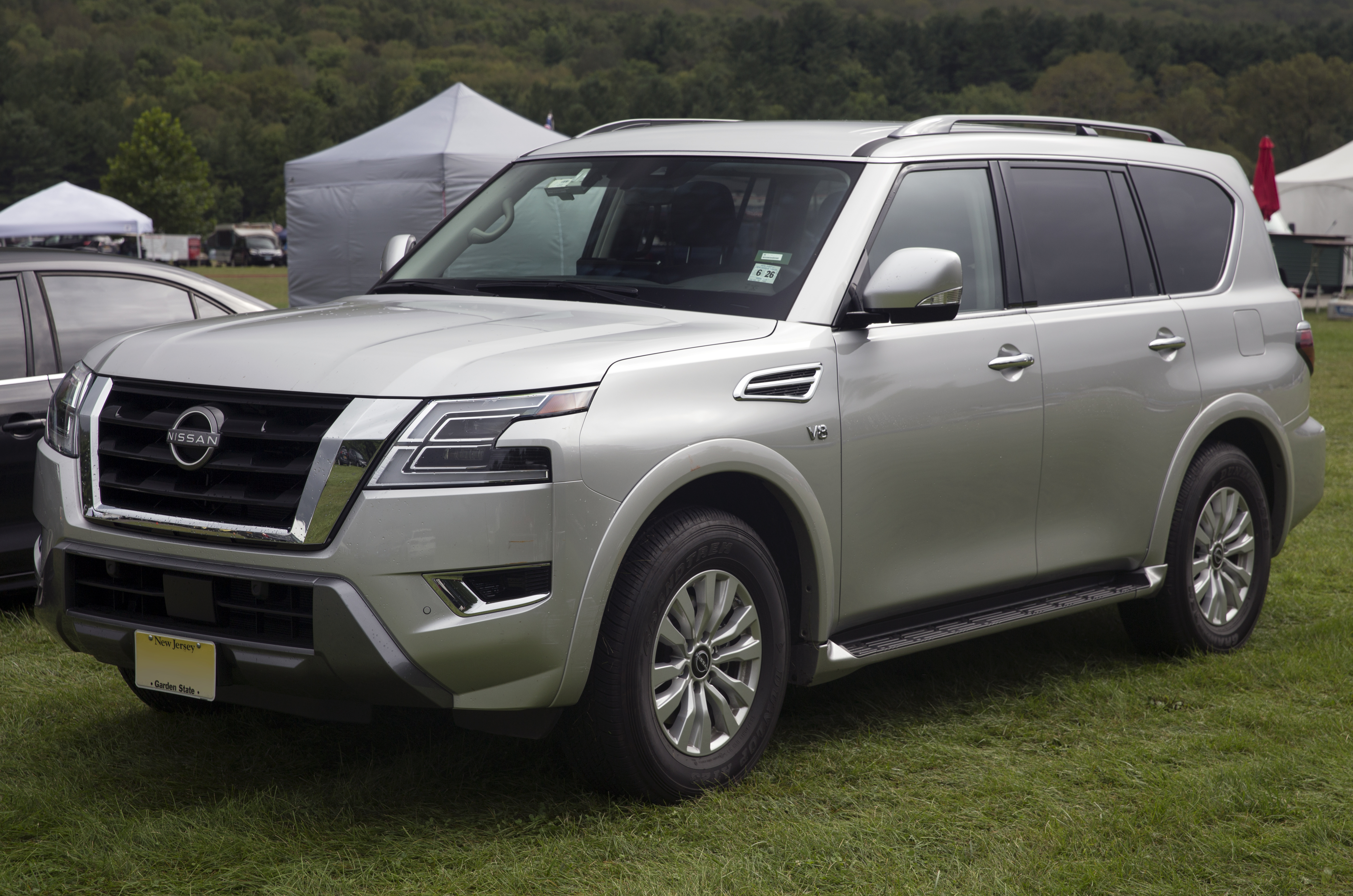
2021 Armada SV (front)

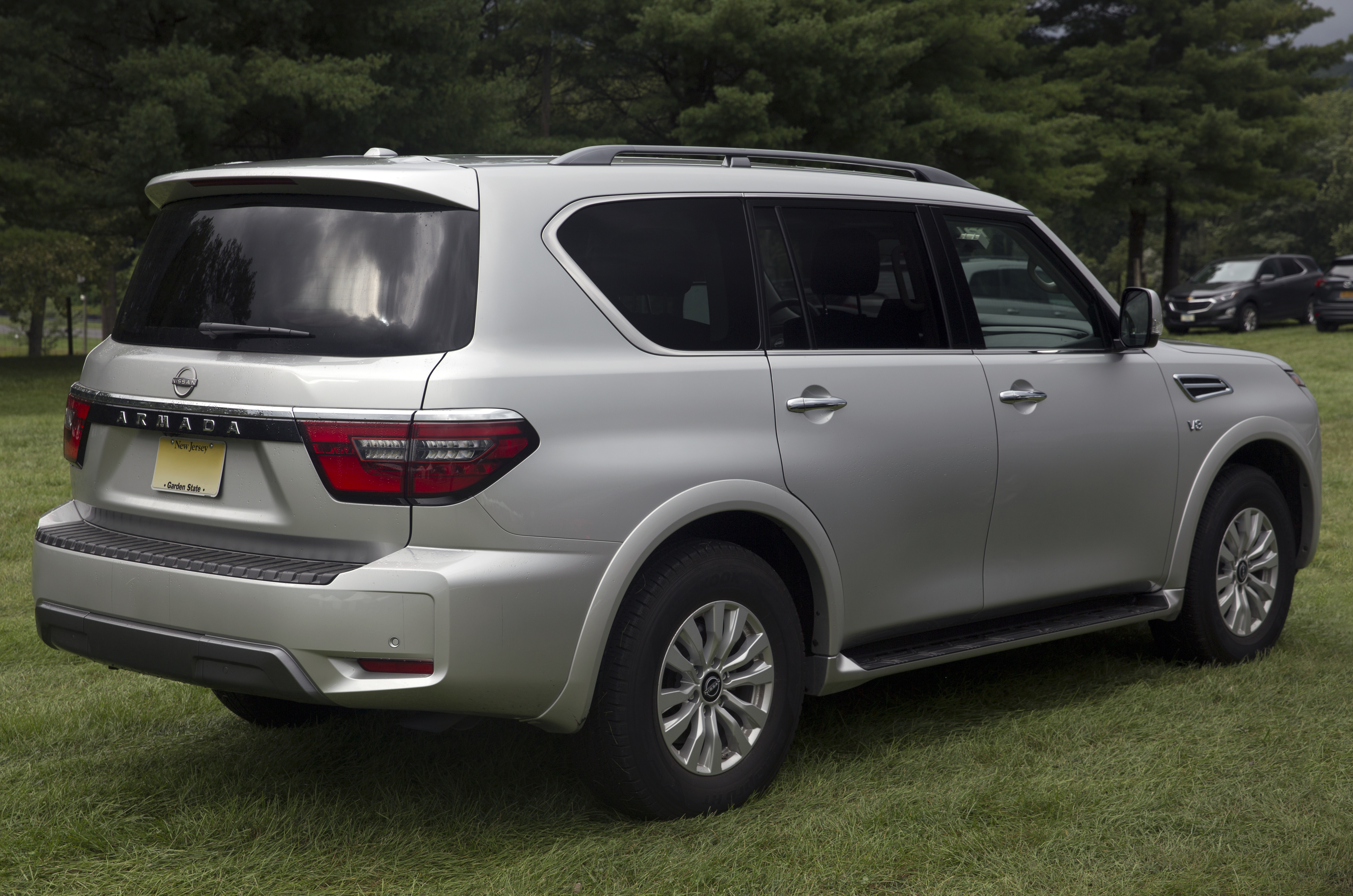
2021 Armada SV (rear)

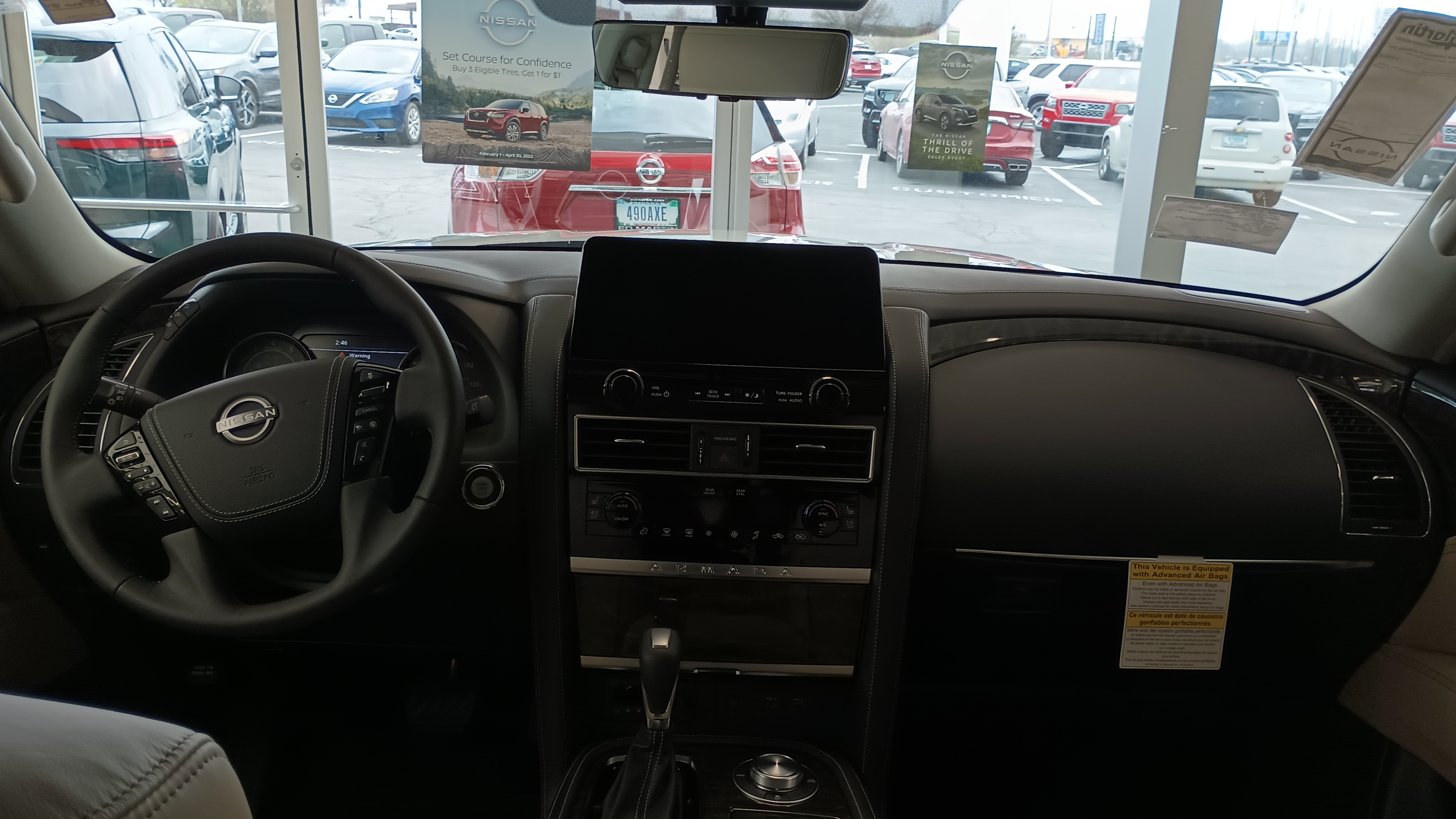
Interior

== Third generation (Y63; 2025) ==
Third generation
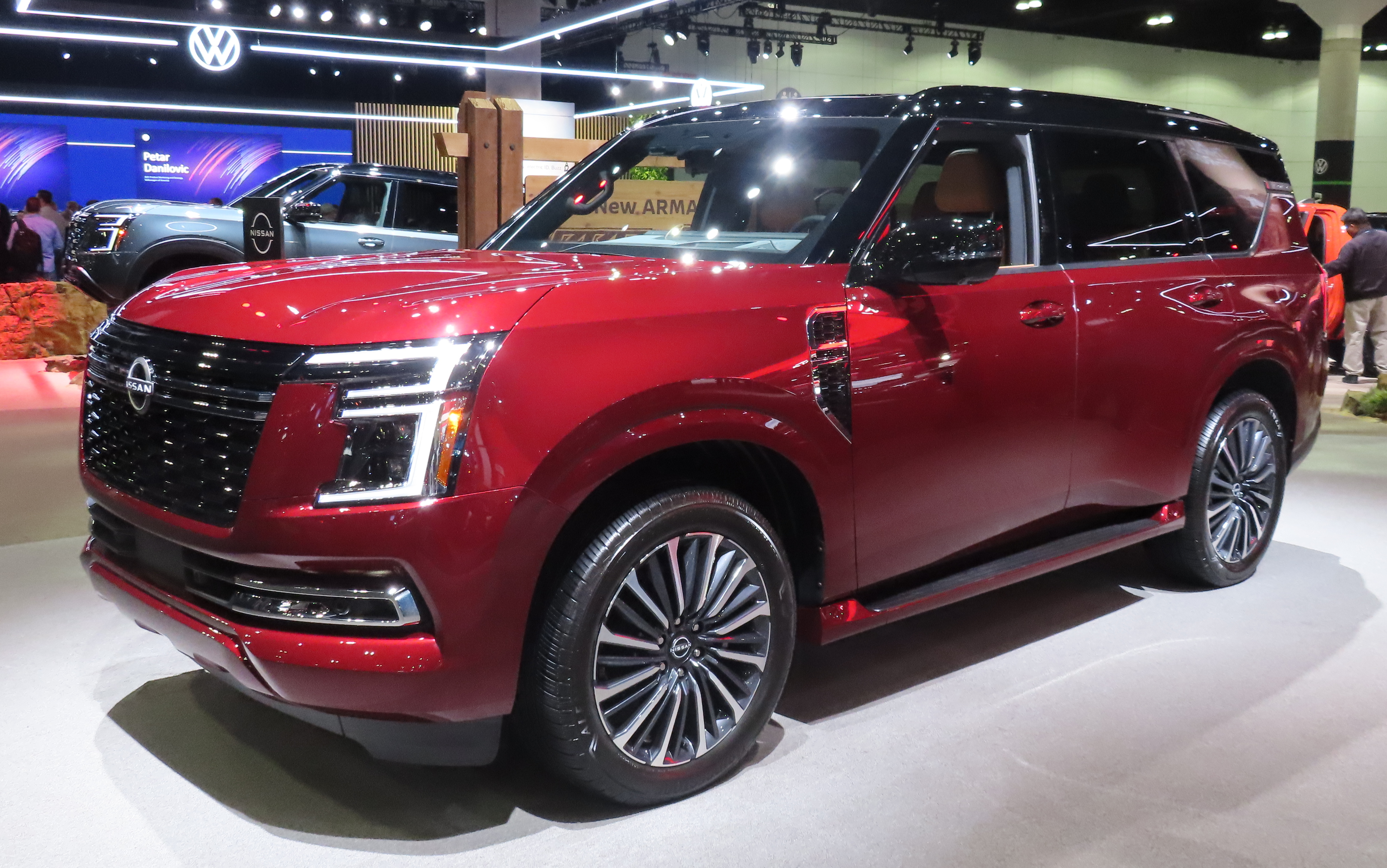
- 2025 Nissan Armada Platinum

Overview
- Model code: Y63
- Also called: Nissan Patrol
- Production: November 2024 – present
- Model years: 2025–present
- Assembly: Japan: Kanda (Nissan Shatai Kyushu Plant)
- Designer: Ken Lee

Body and chassis
- Related: Infiniti QX80 (Z63)

Powertrain
- Engine: Gasoline: 3.5 L VR35DDTT twin-turbo V6
- Power output: 425–460 hp (317–343 kW; 431–466 PS)
- Transmission: 9-speed automatic

Dimensions
- Wheelbase: 3,076 mm (121.1 in)
- Length: 5,324 mm (209.6 in)
- Width: 2,116 mm (83.3 in)
- Height: 1,946–1,981 mm (76.6–78.0 in)
- Curb weight: 2,575–2,772 kg (5,677–6,111 lb)

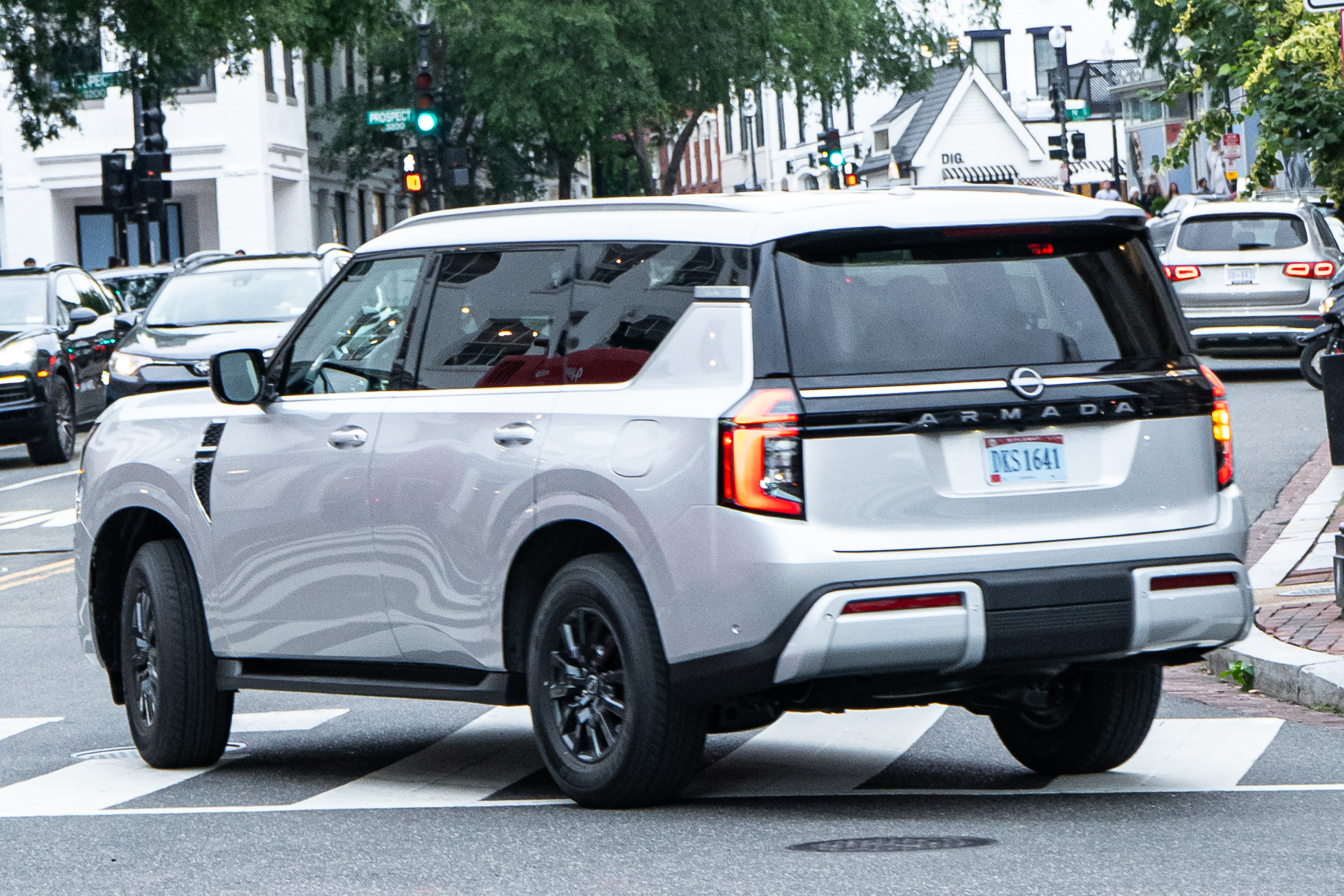
Rear view

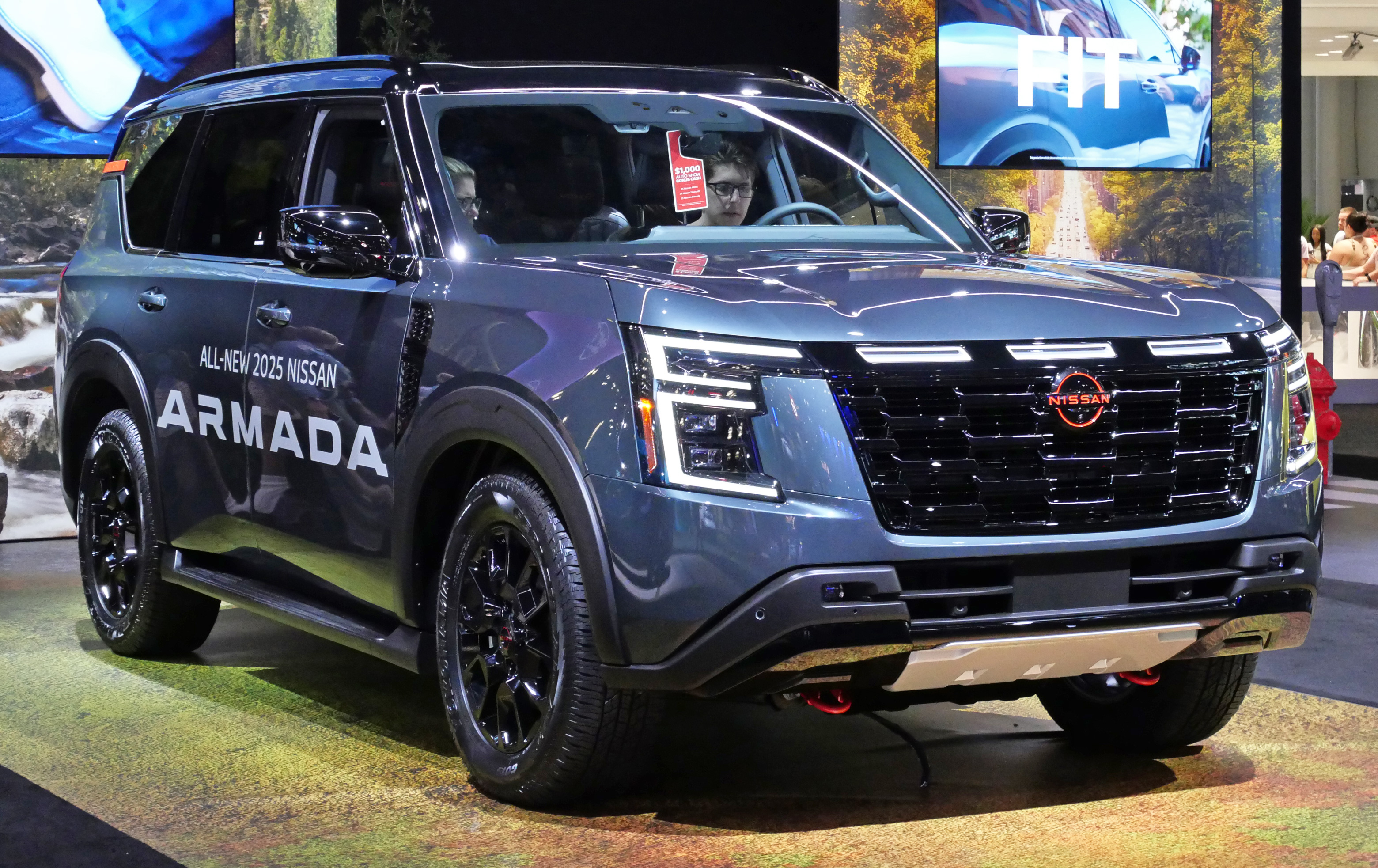

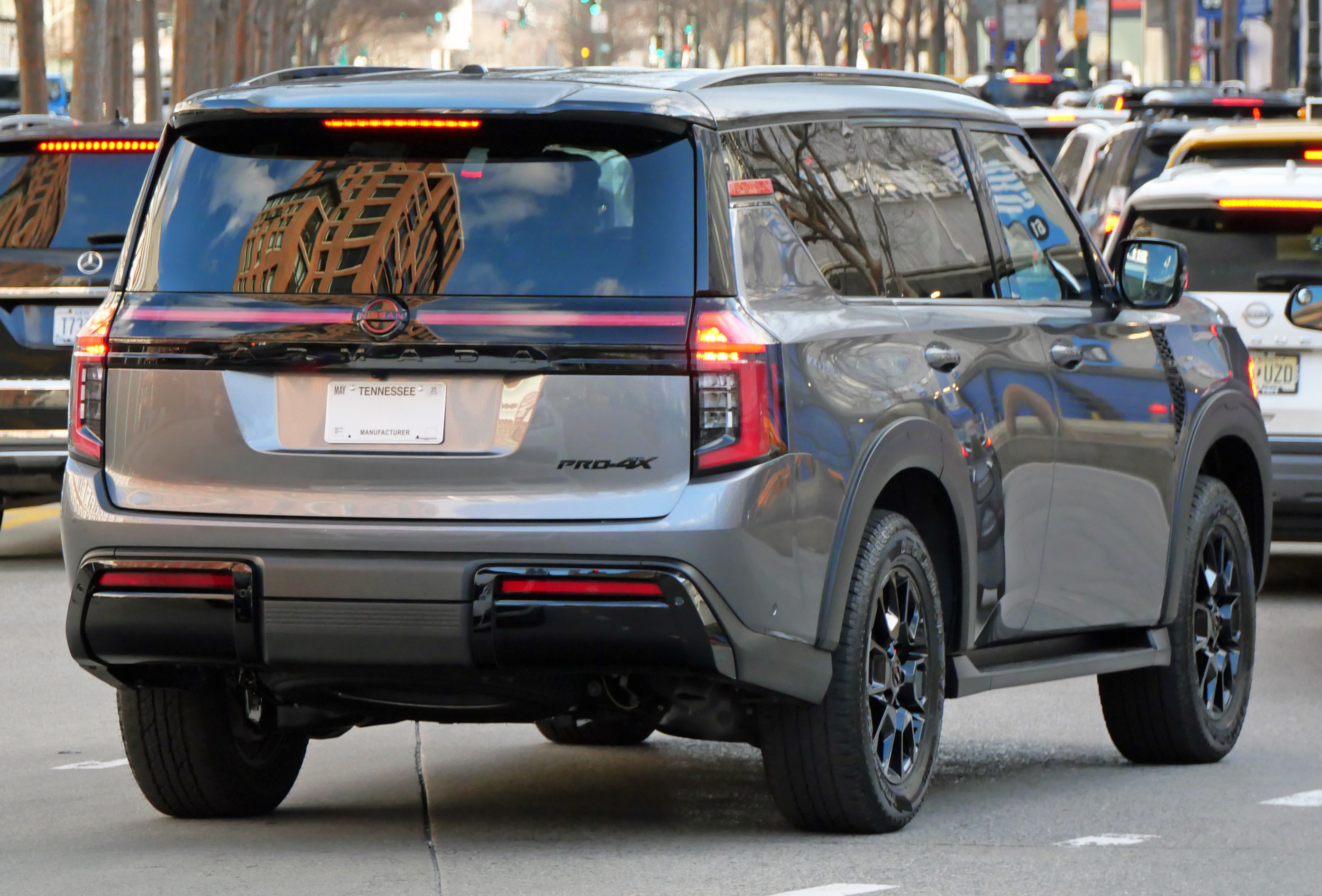
Armada PRO-4X

The third-generation Armada was unveiled on September 3, 2024 and went on sale in December 2024. It is available in five grades: SV, SL, Platinum, Pro-4X, and Platinum Reserve. All trims except the Pro-4X are available in both two-wheel and four-wheel drive models. The Pro-4X is only available with four-wheel drive.

The exterior of the third-generation Armada features optional 22-inch alloy wheels, all-LED exterior lighting with an available full-width LED taillight, functional air curtain built into the front fascia, and the rear wiper is hidden in the rear spoiler.

Inside, there are two 12.3-inch displays for the instrument cluster, the touchscreen infotainment system with larger 14.3-inch displays available on the upper grades, physical push buttons used for the automatic transmission, physical switches used for HVAC system instead of a touchscreen, and a rotary dial for the drive mode selection. Wireless Apple CarPlay and Android Auto are standard across all grades. Other interior features includes a 64-color ambient lighting, Biometric Cooling function for the front and second-row passengers, Google built-in connectivity, Klipsch Premium Audio System and a wireless charging pad.

The Armada is available with ProPilot Assist 2.1 hands-free advanced driver-assistance system, which includes hands-free functionality for highway driving.

All Armada models are powered by a 3.5-liter twin-turbocharged V6 gasoline engine producing 425 hp (317 kW) and 516 lb⋅ft (700 N⋅m) of torque paired a 9-speed automatic transmission, with the option between rear-wheel drive and an Intelligent 4WD system. The vehicle has standard towing capacity of 8,500 lb (3,900 kg) with an integrated Class IV tow hitch. It is also available with an Integrated Trailer Brake Controller a standard Trailer Blind Spot Monitoring.

The third-generation Armada has a maximum cargo capacity of 97.1 cu ft (2,750 L). A power tailgate (SL grade and above) with a motion activated feature (Platinum grade and above) is available.

For the first time in the model's history, the Armada is available with an off-road focused Pro-4X model. The Pro-4X model features 2.1 in (53 mm) ground clearance, eight selectable drive modes (Standard, Eco, Sport, Tow, Snow, Sand, Rock, Mud/Rut), Adaptive Electronic Air Suspension, all-terrain tires, an electronic locking differential, underbody skid plates. Compared to the standard Armada, the Pro-4X model has improved approach, break-over, and departure angles of 33°, 25.5°, and 24.5°, respectively. The Pro-4X model comes standard with the Intelligent 4WD system.

The 2027 Armada Patrol Pro-4X, which replaced the previous Pro-4X trim, will be the first use the Patrol nameplate in North America since the second generation Patrol, sold from 1962 to 1969.

=== Armada Nismo ===
The Armada Nismo was unveiled on June 24, 2025, alongside the Middle Eastern Patrol Nismo. This marks the first time the Nismo variant is sold in North America, as the previous generation was not offered.

=== Safety ===
The 2025 model year Armada was awarded "Top Safety Pick+" by IIHS. The third-generation Armada is equipped with Nissan Safety Shield 360 system as standard across all trims and available features such as Front Wide View and Invisible Hood View cameras.

IIHS scores (2025 model year)
| Small overlap front | Good | |
| Moderate overlap front (updated test) | Good | |
| Side (updated test) | Good | |
| Headlights | Acceptable | |
| Front crash prevention: vehicle-to-pedestrian | Good | Standard system |
| Front crash prevention: vehicle-to-pedestrian | Good | Optional system |
| Seatbelt reminders | Good | |
| Child seat anchors (LATCH) ease of use | Good+ | |

== Sales ==
| Calendar year | United States | Canada |
|---|---|---|
| 2003 | 6,673 | |
| 2004 | 37,275 | |
| 2005 | 39,508 | 411 |
| 2006 | 32,864 | 219 |
| 2007 | 31,632 | 153 |
| 2008 | 15,685 | 100 |
| 2009 | 9,903 | 196 |
| 2010 | 19,344 | 413 |
| 2011 | 18,311 | 611 |
| 2012 | 18,072 | 537 |
| 2013 | 14,383 | 539 |
| 2014 | 12,593 | 462 |
| 2015 | 12,737 | 634 |
| 2016 | 14,035 | 689 |
| 2017 | 35,667 | 1,105 |
| 2018 | 32,650 | 1,435 |
| 2019 | 32,044 | 593 |
| 2020 | 19,640 | 358 |
| 2021 | 22,814 | 596 |
| 2022 | 11,923 | 427 |
| 2023 | 21,184 | 874 |
| 2024 | 15,267 | 482 |
| 2025 | 17,465 | 1,157 |
