= Infiniti QX =

Infiniti QX may refer to any of the following SUV models:

== Current ==
- Infiniti QX60, mid-size luxury crossover
- Infiniti QX65, mid-size luxury coupe crossover
- Infiniti QX56/Infiniti QX80, full-size luxury SUV

== Discontinued ==
- Infiniti QX4, mid-size luxury SUV
- Infiniti QX30, subcompact luxury crossover
- Infiniti QX50, compact luxury crossover
- Infiniti QX55, compact luxury coupe crossover
- Infiniti QX70, mid-size luxury crossover

== Gallery ==
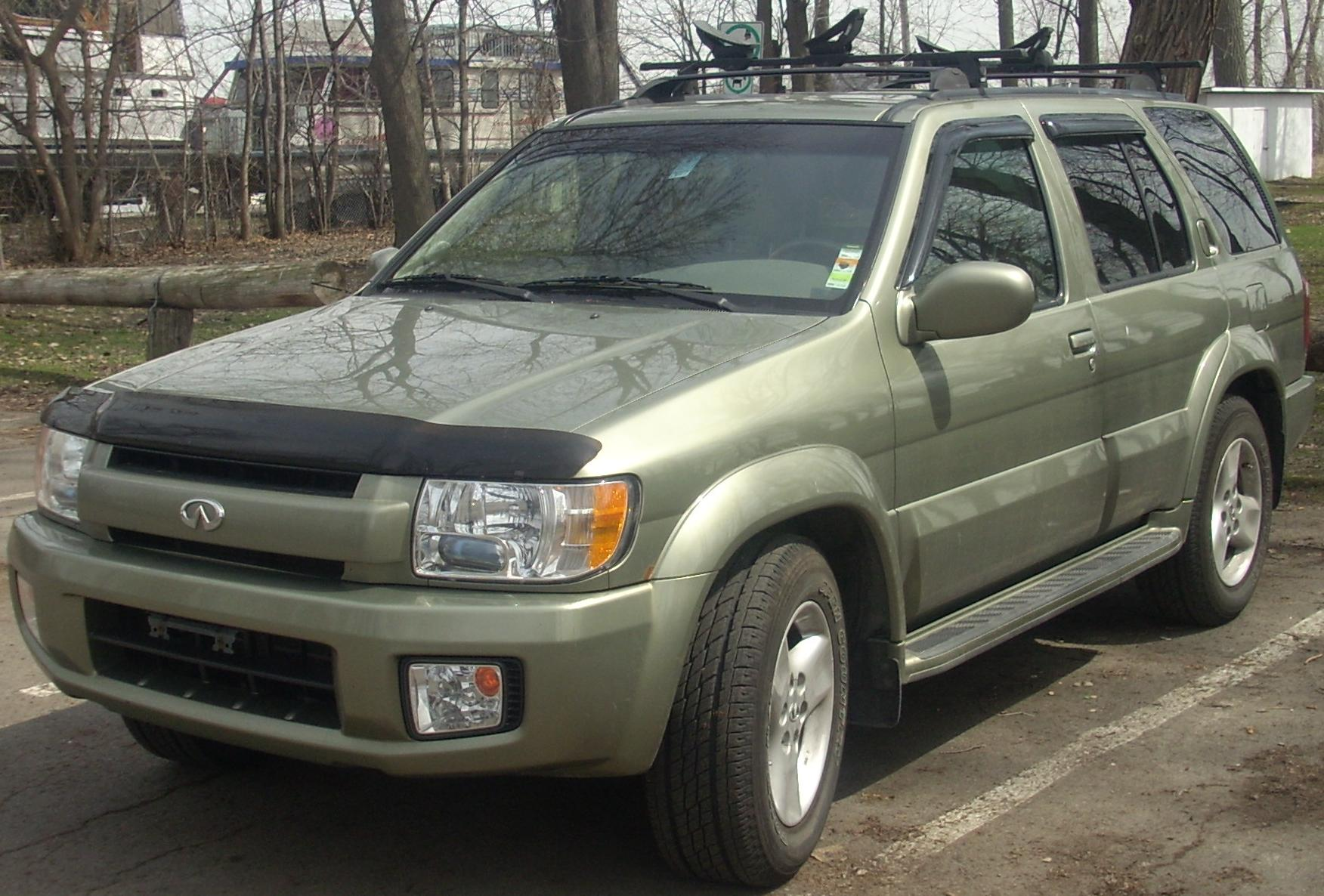
Infiniti QX4

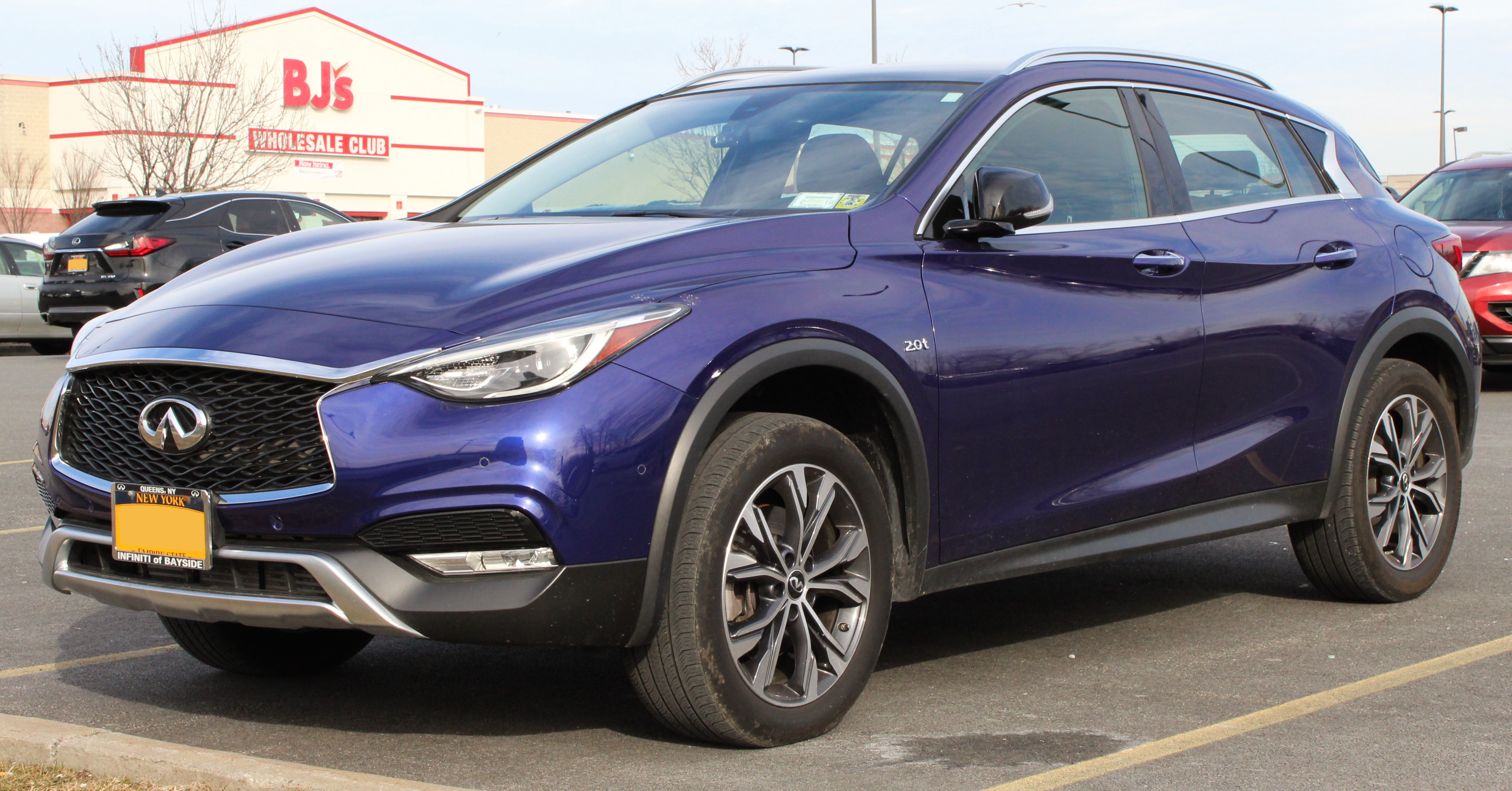
Infiniti QX30

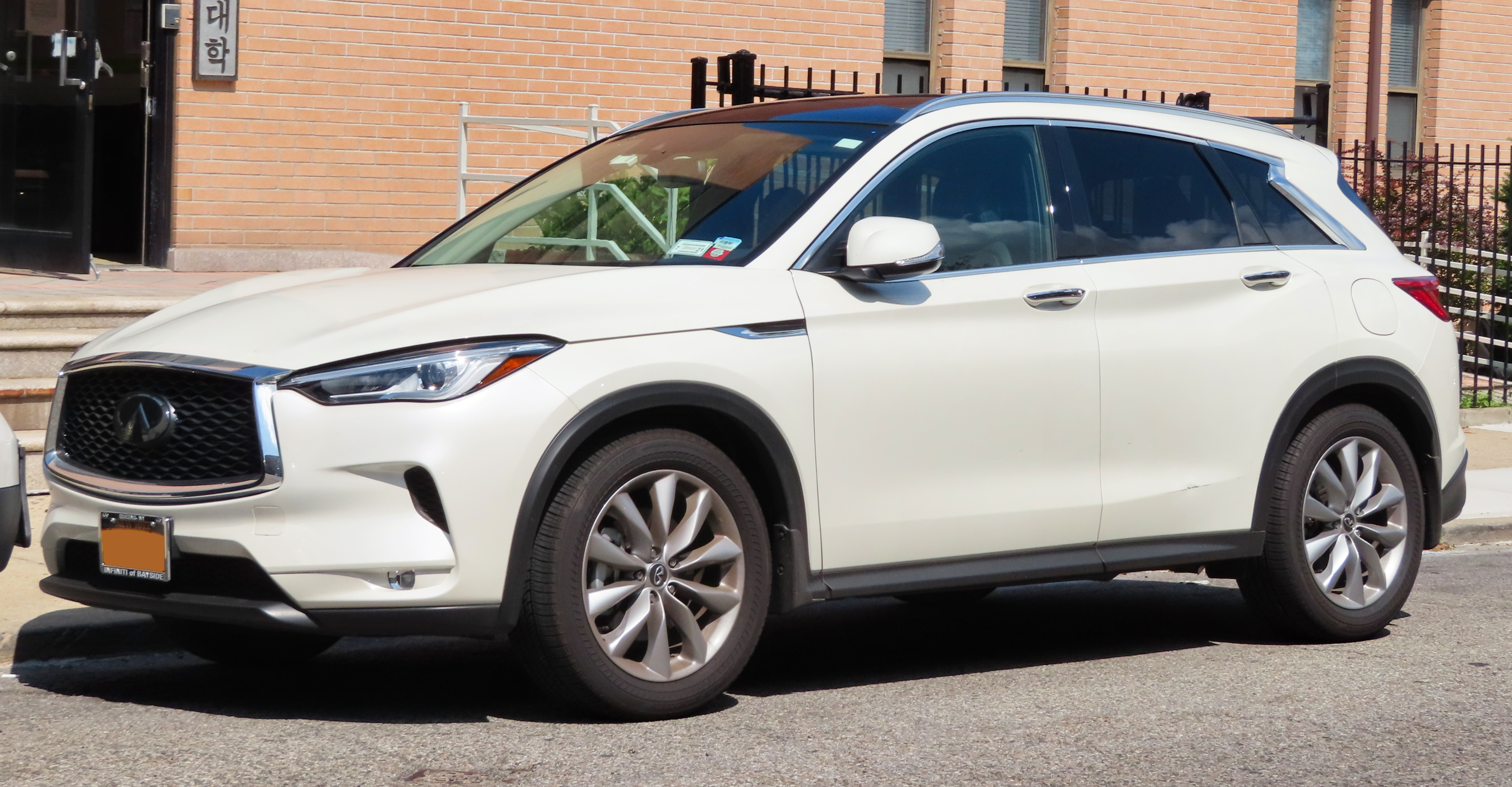
Infiniti QX50

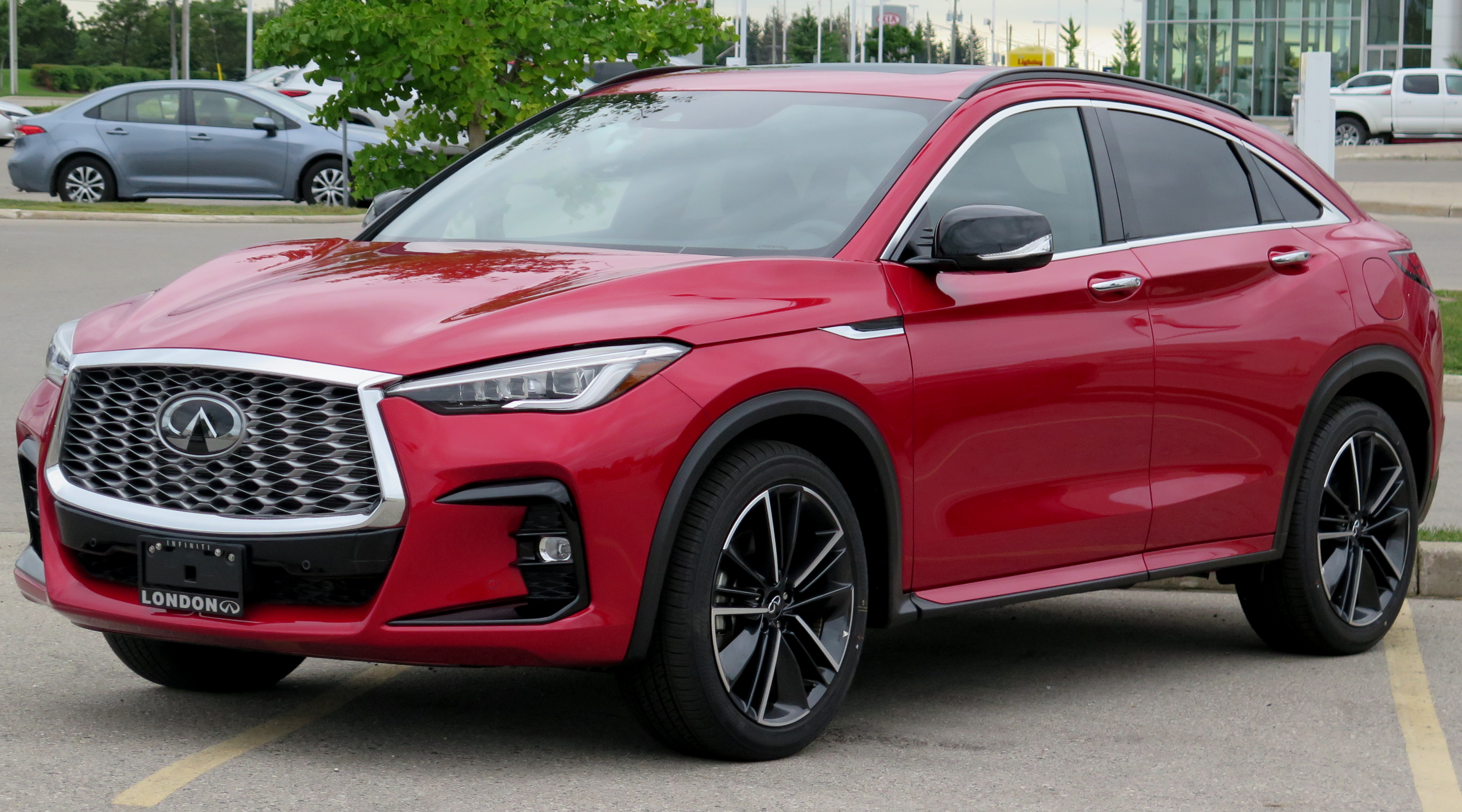
Infiniti QX55

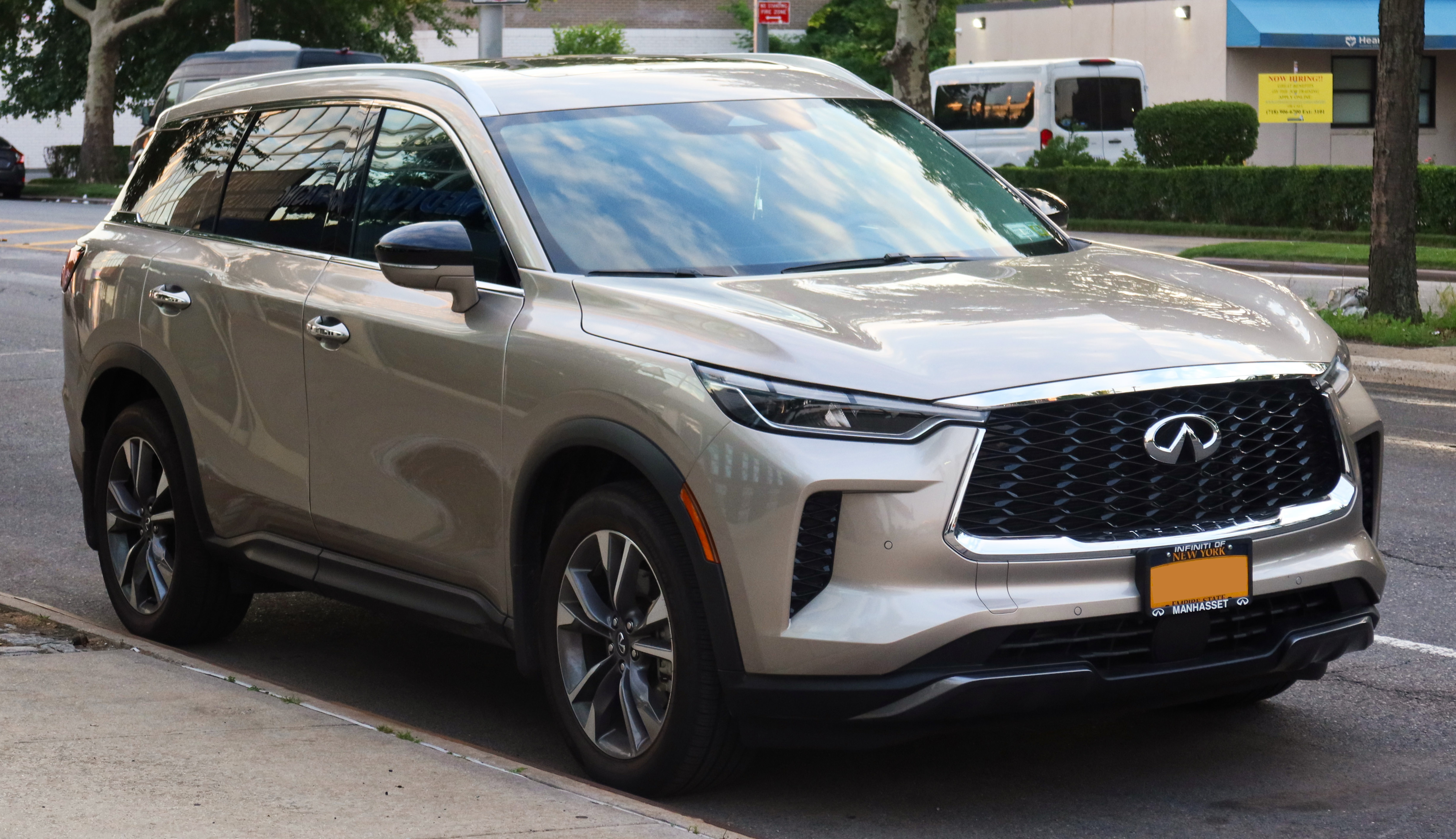
Infiniti QX60

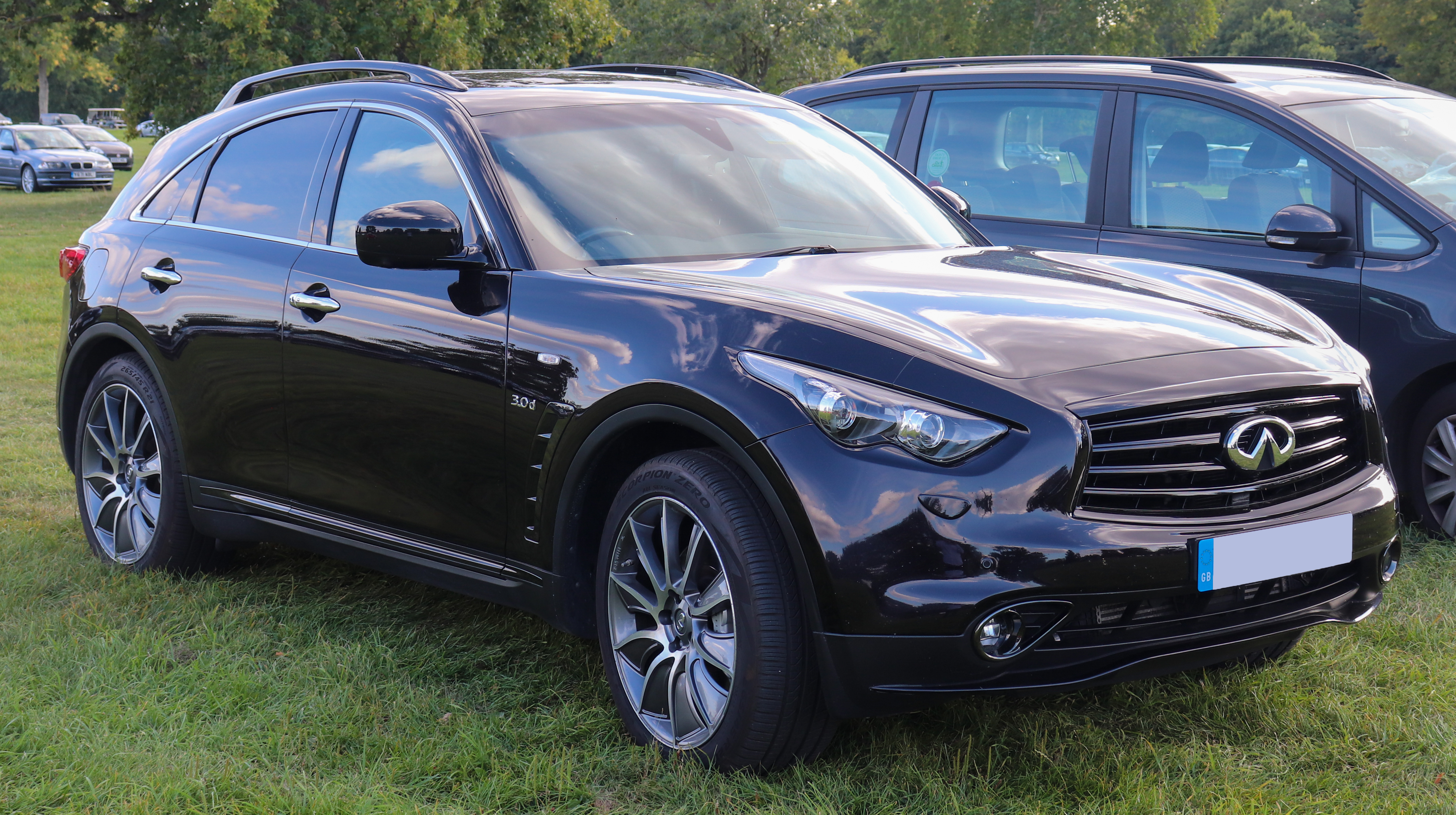
Infiniti QX70

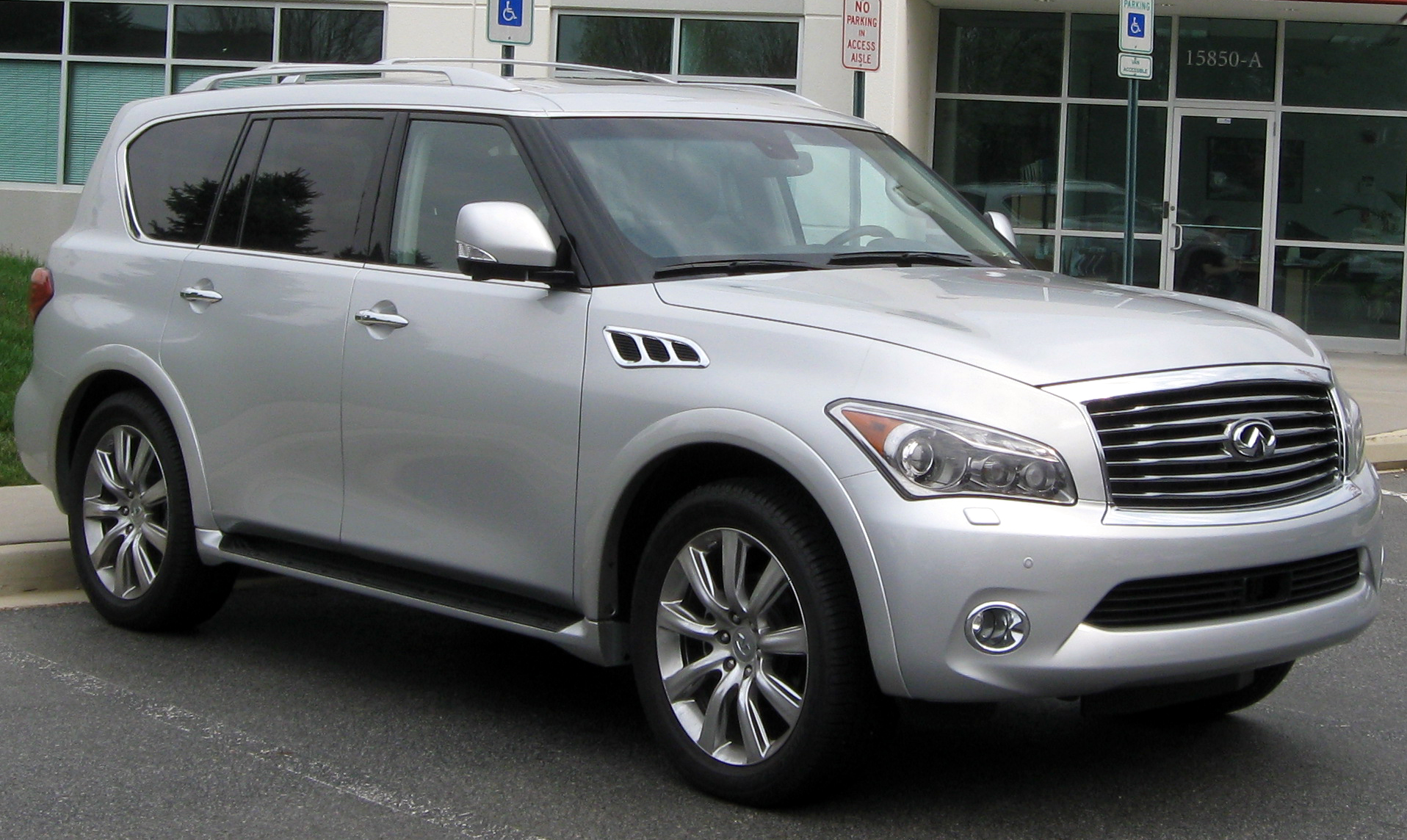
Infiniti QX56

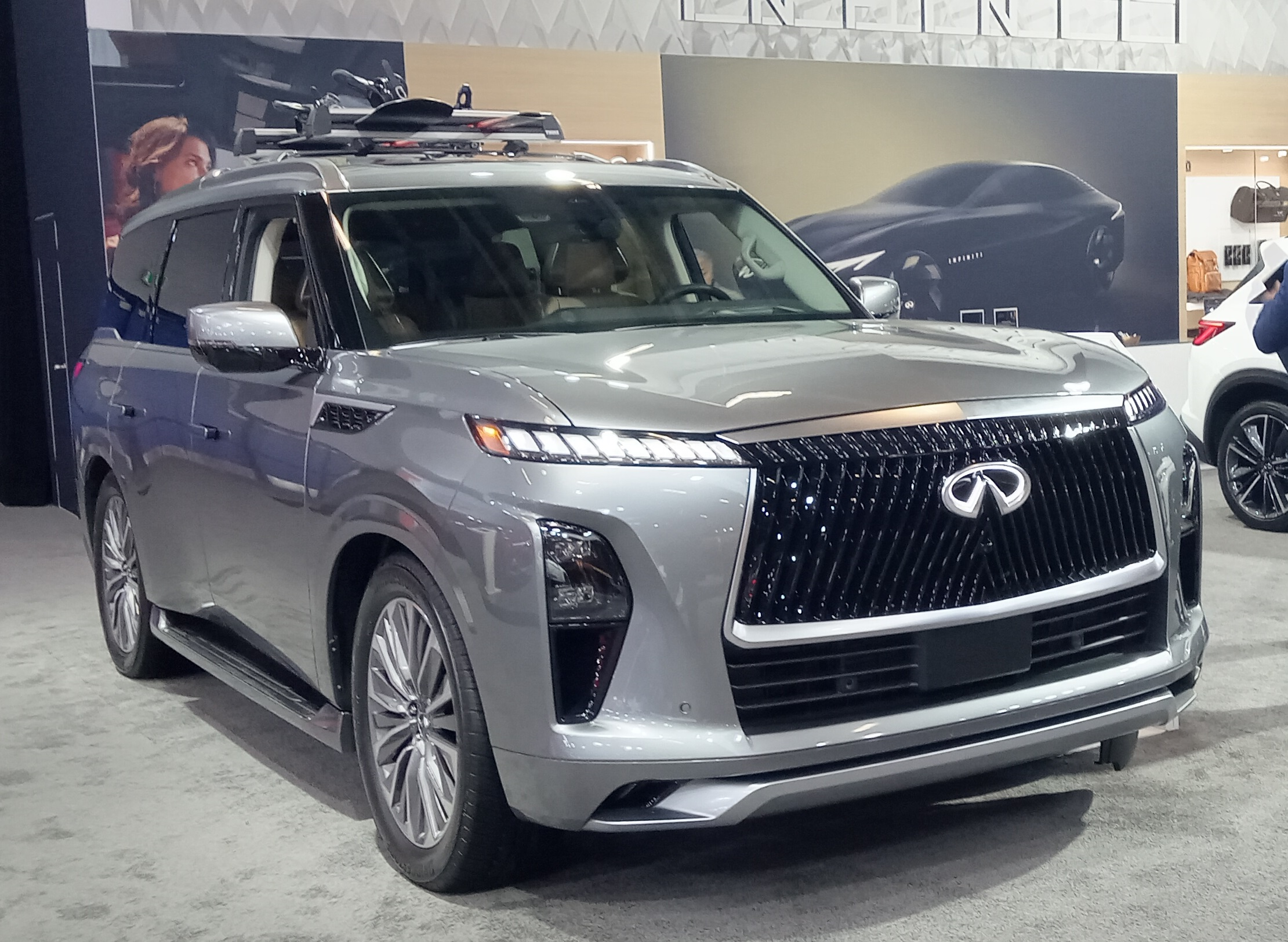
Infiniti QX80
