= QX Metals =

Canadian Material Corporation

QX Metals Corp.
- Formerly: Black Sea Copper & Gold Corp., Alternative Earth Resources Inc.
- Company type: Public
- Traded as: TSX-V: QX
- Headquarters: Vancouver, British Columbia, Canada
- Key people: Vince Sorace (President, CEO & Director)
- Total equity: 36.4 million USD
- Subsidiaries: Blue Mountain Power Company (BC); Nevada Geothermal Power Company (US); Zelenrok EOOD (Bulgaria)
- Website: qxmetals.ca

QX Metals Corp. (previously known as Black Sea Copper & Gold Corp. and previously Alternative Earth Resources Inc.) is a Canadian multinational corporation that is active exploring a porphyry copper-gold deposit in the Bulgarian Rhodope Mountains. The company was first incorporated on April 13, 1995, and most recently changed its name from Black Sea Copper & Gold Corp. to QX Metals Corp. in February 2019. The Black Sea Copper & Gold Corp. was created following the merger of the Alternative Earth Resources Inc. with Black Sea Copper & Gold Corp. in 2016. Alternative Earth Resources Inc. itself was created on April 2, 2013 from Nevada Geothermal Power Inc. The company had focused on producing geothermal electric power from high temperature geothermal resources in the United States. Based in Vancouver, British Columbia, the company had up to six geothermal projects in the Western United States. Despite federal government loan guarantees, the company faced financial trouble and there was "significant doubt about the company's ability to continue as a going concern".

== Projects ==
The company owns a 100% leasehold interest in six properties: Blue Mountain, Pumpernickel, Edna Mountain, and Black Warrior (located in Nevada), New Truckhaven (in California), and Crump Geyser in Oregon. The projects have a production potential of over 200 MW, enough green energy to power approximately 200,000 homes.

The company's Blue Mountain 'Faulkner 1' 49.5 MW gross geothermal power project started producing commercially in November 2009. But its actual production was only 35 MW.
