= Nissan Canton Assembly Plant =

Automotive assembly plant in Canton, Mississippi, U.S.

- Built: 2001–2003
- Operated: 2003–present
- Location: Canton, Mississippi, United States
- Coordinates: 32.572°N 90.070°W
- Products: Nissan Altima; Nissan Frontier
- Employees: 3,200
- Area: 1,038 acres (4.20 km^{2})
- Volume: 4,700,000 square feet (440,000 m^{2})
- Owner: Nissan North America, Inc.

The Nissan Canton assembly plant is an automobile assembly plant in Canton, Mississippi, that began production in 2003. It has the capacity to produce 400,000 vehicles annually.

== History ==
On November 9, 2000, Nissan announced that it will build a $930 million vehicle assembly plant in Canton, Mississippi. The plant broke ground on April 6, 2001.

On June 24, 2002, Nissan announced a $500 million expansion. This added 1 million square feet to the footprint, allowing the plant to build the Nissan Altima in addition to its initial lineup of trucks and SUVs. The $1.4 million vehicle assembly plant was opened on May 27, 2003.

On June 14, 2004, the first Nissan Altima built at the plant was rolled off the assembly line. As part of a two-year, $118 million expansion, Nissan began producing the NV van at the plant on January 19, 2011, along with the 14,499-square-foot Body Assembly Shop expansion.

On June 28, 2012, Nissan announced it will began production of the Sentra at the plant. Production commenced in December 2012, returning production to the United States since leaving the Smyrna plant in 1999.

In August 2012, Nissan shifted Frontier and Xterra production to the plant from its Smyrna, Tennessee plant. The plant began production the Murano in December 2014.

== Products ==
=== Current ===
- Nissan Altima (2005–present)
- Nissan Frontier (2013–present)

=== Future ===
- Nissan Xterra (2027–to commence)

=== Former ===
- Nissan Quest (2004–2009)
- Nissan Armada (2004–2015)
- Infiniti QX56 (2004–2010)
- Nissan Titan (2004–2024)
- Nissan NV (2012–2021)
- Nissan Xterra (2013–2015)
- Nissan Sentra (2013–2014)
- Nissan Murano (2015–2020)
