= NNA =

NNA may refer to:

- Kenitra Air Base, Morocco (IATA code)
- National News Agency, the official news agency of the Lebanese government
- National Newspaper Awards, for Canadian journalism
- National Newspaper Association, an American organization for community newspapers
- National Notary Association, an American organization for notaries public
- National numbering agency for International Securities Identifying Number
- A neural network accelerator, a specialised hardware computer system to speed up artificial intelligence or machine learning applications
- Nissan North America, Inc., a subsidiary of Nissan Motor Corporation
