= Bryan Thompson (designer) =

American automotive and freelance designer

Bryan Scot Thompson
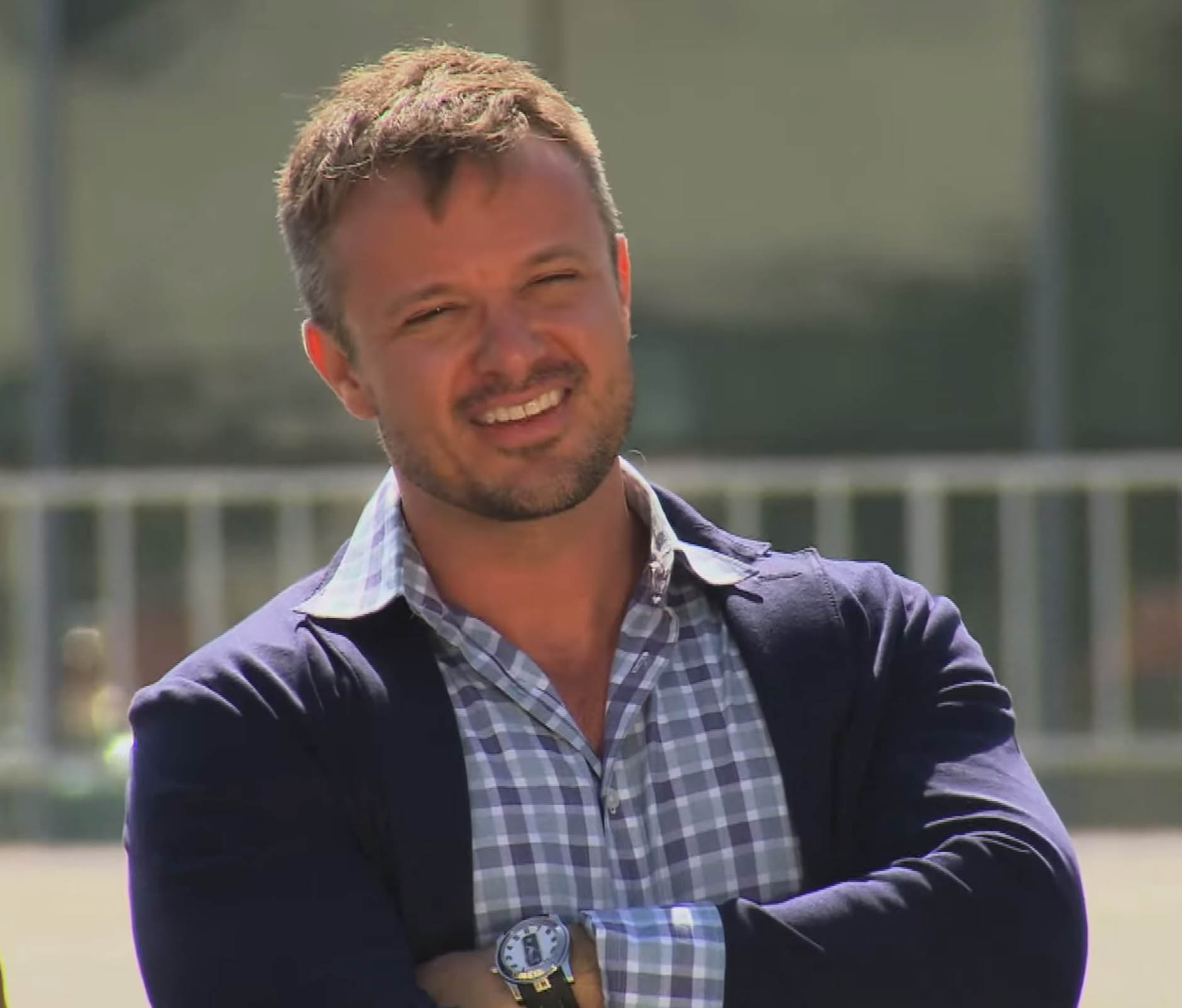
- Born: Bryan Thompson; October 11, 1974; Phoenix, Arizona, US
- Education: College for Creative Studies
- Occupations: Automotive and Freelance Designer
- Employer: Nissan Design America (1999-2009)
- Website: Bryan Thompson Design

Bryan Thompson is an American media consultant as well as graphic, automotive and freelance designer widely known for his ten-year tenure as an interior and exterior stylist with Nissan Design America in San Diego, California — as well as his concept designs for Mack Trucks (subsidiary of Volvo), Embraer and Airstream. Thompson has freelance-designed in studios globally, including in France, Japan, Austria, and Brazil."

== Background ==
Born in Phoenix, Arizona to Benjamin J. and Peggy Thompson, he developed a passion for design as a child: Thompson noted that "everything — from our family Toyota Tercel 4WD to the Bang & Olufsen stereo my mom came home with on a whim in 1979 — had a soul or presence in my mind because they "affected" the world they existed in. I thought that since those things illicit strong reactions in people, they were somehow alive. They certainly had a sentience in my mind. I wanted to make friends with the stereo, the car, the phone, and then create more friends."

Thompson's mother surmised he was gay at a young age, embraced his creativity, and allowed him at age five to redecorate their home, "giving me that freedom definitely ignited a spark and confidence that you can change the space you’re in, I’m very grateful she did that." He began drawing cars at age three after noticing the neighbor's Datsun B210 Honey Bee: "It had tiny wheels, awkward styling and a giant decal of a Bee plastered on the side. At three years old, I was in love." Having developed a passion for old, under-appreciated economy cars, Thompson was featured in a 2011 New York Times article by noted automotive journalist, Phil Patton, who related Thompson's effort to find a new home for his 1990 Nissan Pao after the closure of the museum where it was featured.

After studying at Arizona State University, Thompson received a Bachelor of Industrial Design degree from Detroit's College for Creative Studies (CCS) in 1999 and was subsequently employed at Nissan Design America in San Diego from 1999 to 2009 — at what was then, Nissan Design International (NDI).

He has lived in Los Angeles with his partner, since 2011.

== Career ==
Thompson was hired by Nissan after graduating from CCS, directly entering the company's production program, including his first professional project, the Nissan Titan and Armada interiors. He worked with Nissan designer Doug Wilson on the Nissan Pulsar NX and subsequently led the redesign of the Nissan NV2500 cargo van — presented by Nissan in 2010. Thompson's approach to design is functional and whimsical.

In 2006 he initiated a relationship with Airstream by arriving with a design model of the trailer that would become the company's BaseCamp model, at the opening of the Airstream Diner on Los Angeles's Santa Monica Boulevard.

== Media and philanthropy ==
Thompson placed second on the 2014 reality television show "Motor City Masters" on TruTV, winning a 2016 Chevy Camaro Z28 (6th Gen. Camaro). Thompson, who is openly gay, had pledged prior to the show, to start a scholarship for LGBT designers By auctioning the $80,000 car and using the funds to start the Bryan Thompson Design Scholarship. Starting the scholarship was the reason he decided to do the show. He was skeptical about joining the production but producers convinced him the show would be inspirational showcasing contestants' creativity. Thompson and "Motor City Masters" winner Camillo Pardo had agreed before the finale to split the prize of $100,000 and the car with whoever came in second.
