= Federal Chamber of Notaries (Russia) =

Notary association in Russia

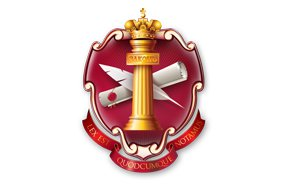
- Founded: 22 September 1993
- Type: Notary association
- Purpose: Advocacy, public representation, education and networking
- Headquarters: Moscow, Russia
- Location: Dolgorukovskaya Street 15, bldg. 4-5
- Region served: Russia
- Official language: Russian
- Leader: Konstantin Korsik
- Main organ: Assembly of representatives of the chambers of notaries of the subjects of the Russian Federation
- Website: https://www.notariat.ru

The Federal Chamber of Notaries (Russian: Федеральная нотариальная палата) is a Russian non-governmental organization which unites regional chambers of notaries on the basis of mandatory membership. The Federal Chamber of Notaries is a professional association of notaries operating on the basis of the self-governing. The Federal Chamber of Notaries carries out a representation of the interests of notaries in state bodies, local government bodies, a protection of the rights of notaries, a coordination of the activities of regional chambers of notaries, a provision of advanced training for notaries.

The Federal Chamber of Notaries is a member of the International Union of Notaries.

== History ==
The Federal Chamber of Notaries was founded at Conference of representatives of chamber of notaries of subjects of the Russian Federation on 22 September 1993. It is governed by the Fundamentals of the legislation of the Russian Federation on notaries of 13 March 1993 No.4462-1.

== Organizational structure ==
The Assembly of representatives of the chambers of notaries of the subjects of the Russian Federation, which is convened not less than once every one years is a supreme management body of the Federal Chamber of Notaries.

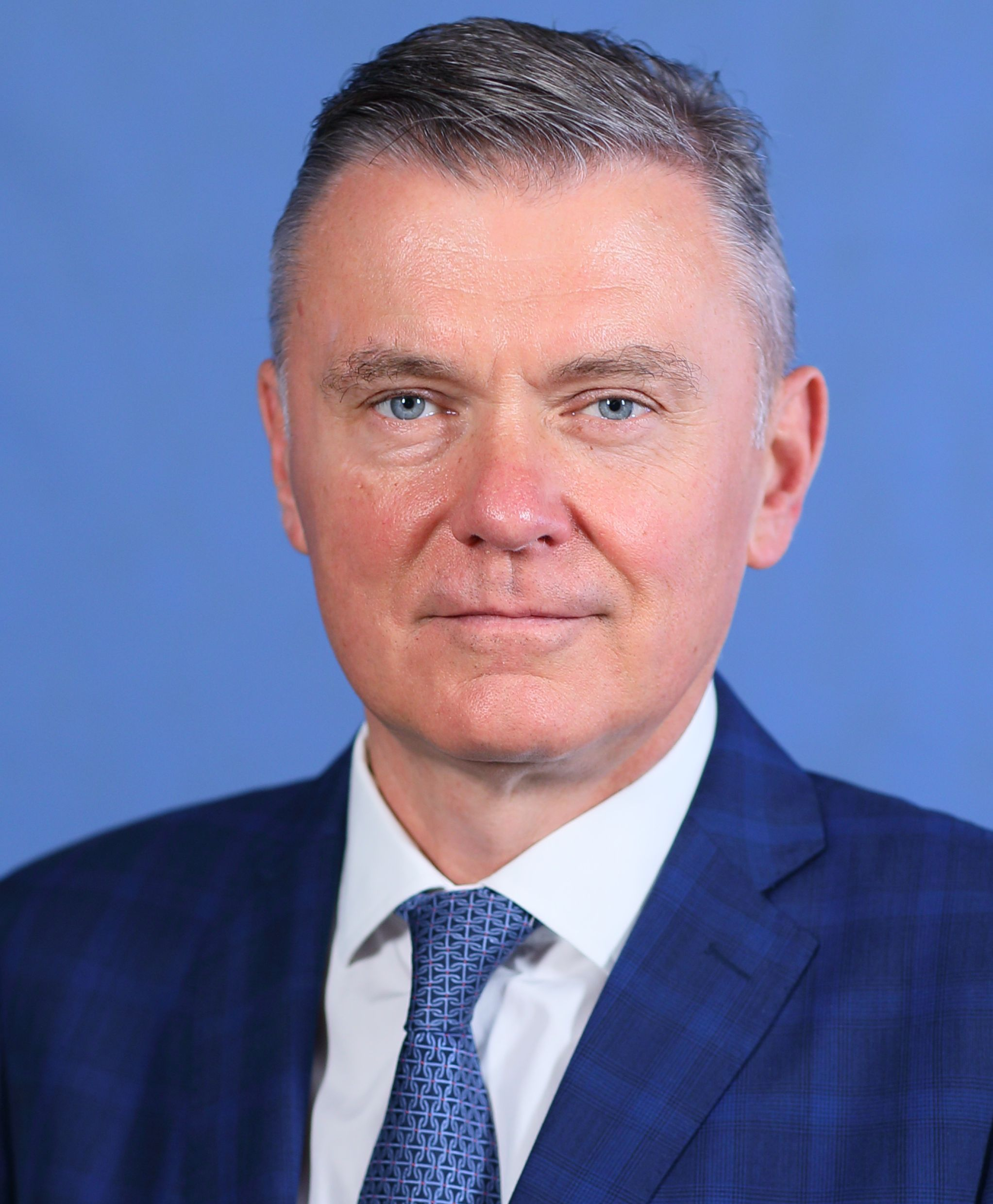
Konstantin Korsik, the President of the Russian Federal Chamber of Notaries

The Board of the Federal Chamber of Notaries is a collegiate executive body of the Federal Chamber of Notaries. The Board is led by the President of the Federal Chamber of Notaries who is elected by the Assembly of representatives of chambers of notaries of the subjects of the Russian Federation.

The Audit Commission of the Federal Chamber of Notaries is a control after financially economic activity body.

== Print media outlets ==
The Federal Chamber of Notaries publishes the journal "Нотариальный вестник" (English: Notary Bulletin) (ISSN 1819–6624).

== Federal Chamber's awards ==
The Federal Chamber of Notaries grants the following awards to Russian notaries:

- Anatoliy Tikhenko Medal
- Badge "For services to notariat"
- Medal "For many years of conscientious work in notariat" (I class, II class, III class)
- Honorary charter
- Written commendation

== See also ==
- National Notary Association
