= Russian Agency of Legal and Judicial Information =

Russian state-operated domestic news agency

- Industry: News agency
- Founded: 10 February 2009
- Headquarters: 4 Zubovsky Boulevard, Moscow, 119021, Russia
- Key people: Vitaly Ushkanov
- Products: News media, legal journalism
- Website: www.rapsinews.ru

The Russian Agency of Legal and Judicial Information (Russian: Российское агентство правовой и судебной информации), abbreviated in Russian as РАПСИ (RAPSI), is a Russian news agency specializing in news related to an activity of the judiciary of Russia.

It was founded by the RIA Novosti, the Constitutional Court of Russia, the Supreme Court of Russia, and the High Court of Arbitration of Russia on 10 February 2009 and was included in the Russian Unified State Register of legal entities on 20 August 2009 as autonomous non-commercial organization with the assignment of primary state registration number 1097799014246 and taxpayer identification number 7704276230. Its number in All-Russian classifier of enterprises and organizations maintained by the Federal State Statistics Service is 94160342. The Russian Agency of Legal and Judicial Information was registered as news agency by the Federal Service for Supervision of Communications, Information Technology and Mass Media on 8 April 2014 (certificate of registration ИА No. ФС 77–57654).

The Russian Agency of Legal and Judicial Information publishes news on its website in Russian and English.

== History ==
The Russian Agency of Legal and Judicial Information was founded as subsidiary organization of the RIA Novosti.

In 2014, as the result of the reorganization of the RIA Novosti, the Russian Agency of Legal and Judicial Information became independent organization.

== Activity ==
The Russian Agency of Legal and Judicial Information gathers news reports, drawing on the work of own correspondents and public relations divisions of Russian courts, other Russian state bodies, the Federal Chamber of Advocates of Russian Federation, the Federal Chamber of Notaries, etc. Agency's correspondents make reports from the courtroom on high-profile cases, interview an experts, prepare an understandable to non-lawyers summaries of judicial acts, bills and other legal documents.

== Financial situation ==
According to 2018 fiscal year annual financial reporting, The Russian Agency of Legal and Judicial Information had a total assets amounting to 1245000 rubles and net loss for the year amounting to 7846000 rubles.
