= Nissan Frontier (North America) =

Pickup truck line produced by Nissan

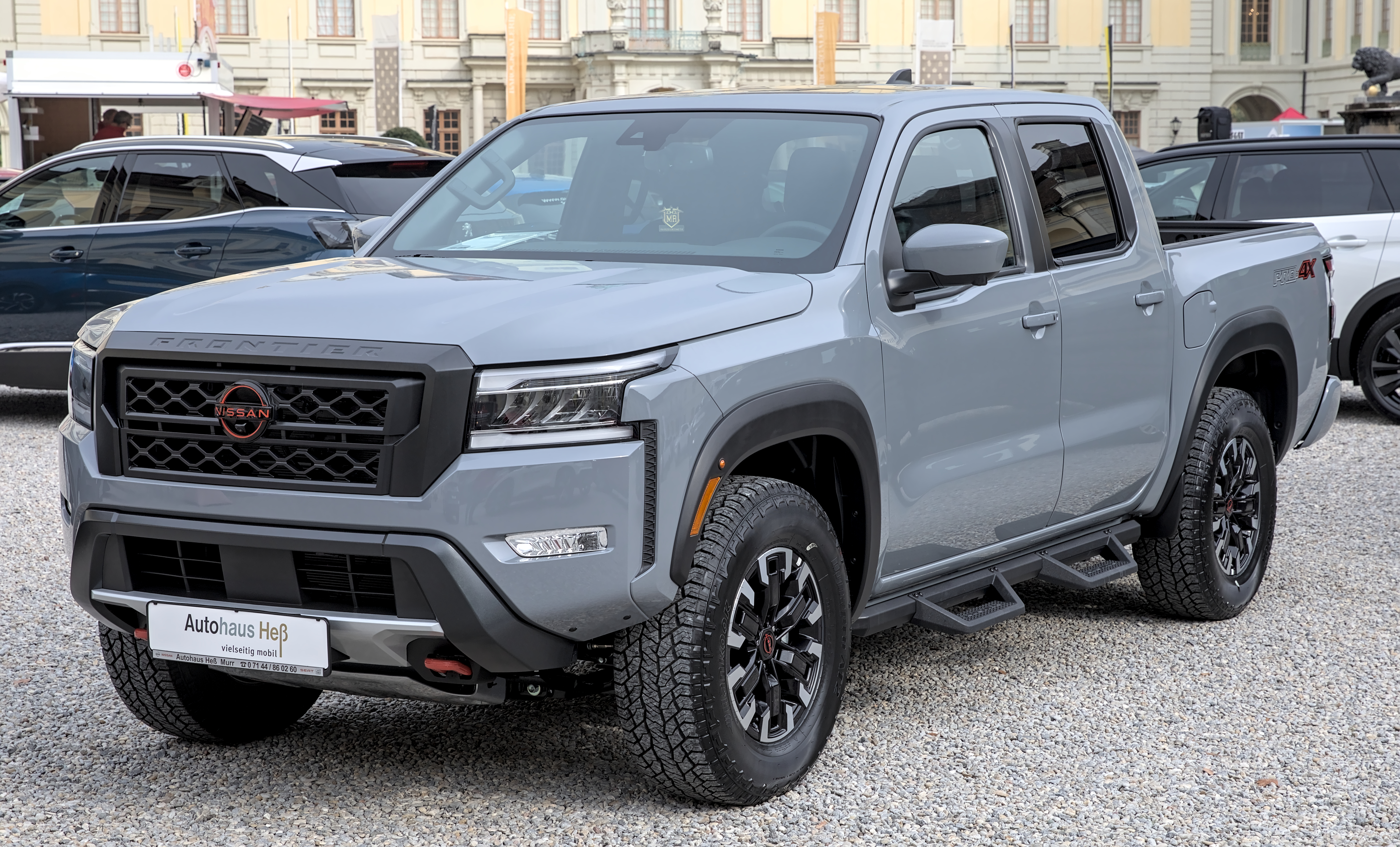
- 2022 Nissan Frontier Pro-4X (D41, US)

Overview
- Manufacturer: Nissan
- Also called: Nissan Navara/NP300 (1997–2021)
- Production: 1997–present

Body and chassis
- Class: Compact pickup truck (1997–2005); Mid-size pickup truck (2005–present)
- Body style: 2-door pickup truck; 4-door pickup truck
- Layout: Front-engine, rear-wheel-drive; Front-engine, four-wheel-drive

Chronology
- Predecessor: Nissan Hardbody (D21)

The Nissan Frontier is a nameplate used by Nissan in several regions as an alternative to the Navara and NP300 nameplates. In North America, the nameplate was used from the 1998 to 2021 model years, replacing the Hardbody. Since 2021, for the 2022 model year, the Frontier sold in the US and Canada has been a separate model distinct from the globally marketed Navara/Frontier. It is larger and more developed to cater to the needs of the North American market.

== Parallel models (D22, D40; 1998–2021) ==
The D22 Frontier was introduced in the US and Canada in 1997 to replace the D21 Hardbody. In other markets, the D22 Frontier is also called the Navara, Frontier Navara, NP300, Hardbody, or PickUp, among others. It was replaced by the D40 Frontier in 2004 for the 2005 model year, which was produced in the US for both the US and Canadian markets up to the 2021 model year. Both generations were mostly identical to the global version offered by Nissan elsewhere, with minor changes for the North American market.

When the D23 Navara was introduced for the global market in 2014, a Nissan North America spokesperson restated that the D23 is not indicative of a D40 Frontier replacement for the North American market.

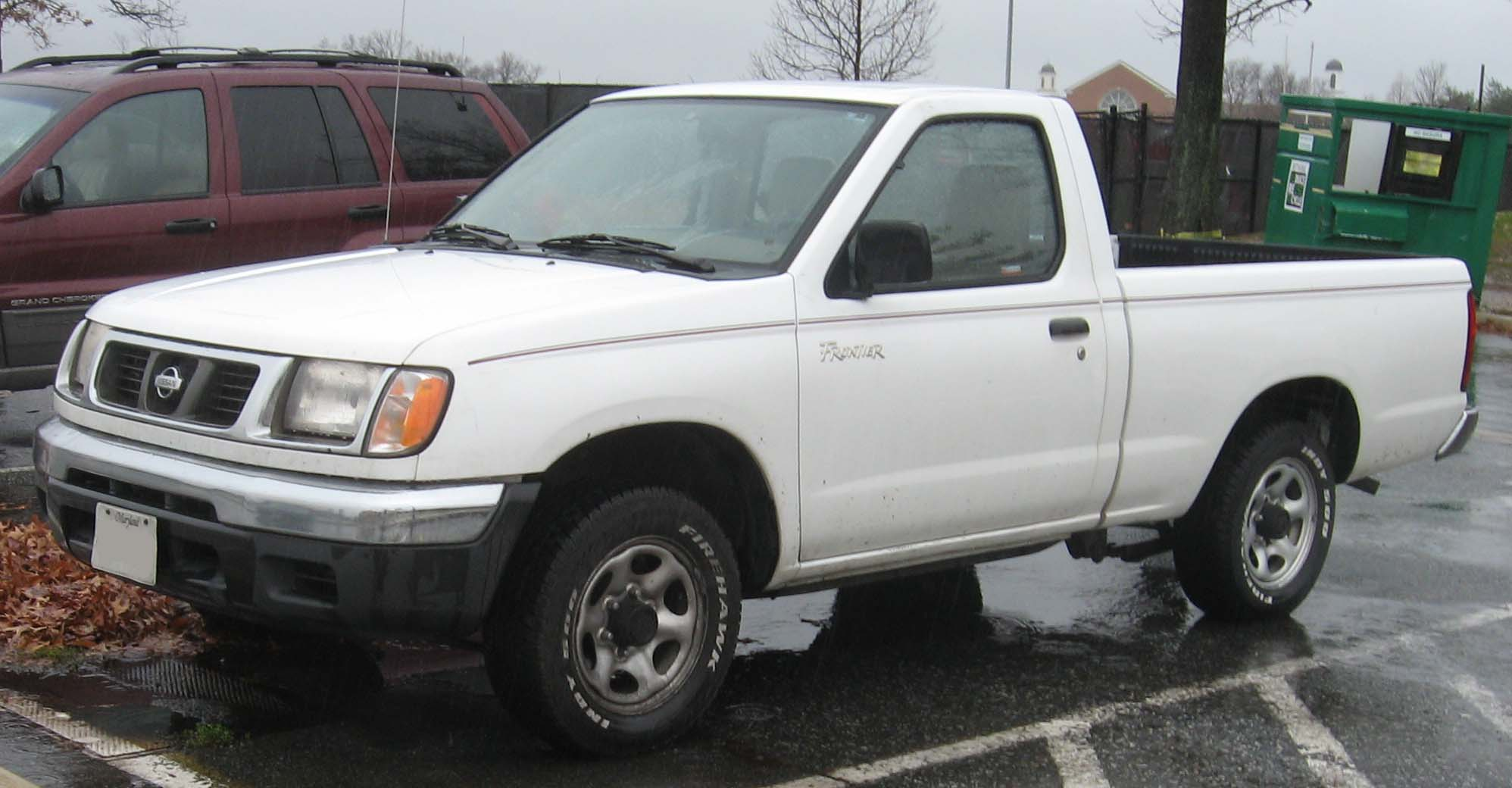
1998–2000 D22 Frontier single cab (US)

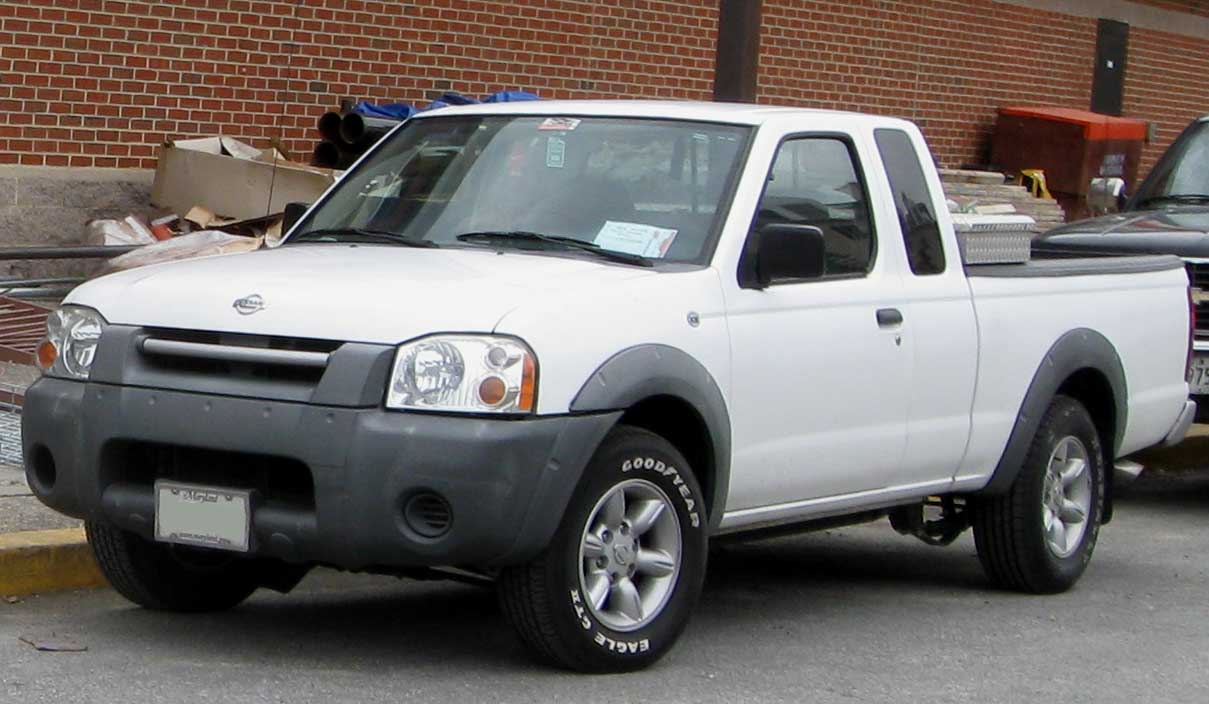
2001–2004 D22 Frontier extended cab (US)

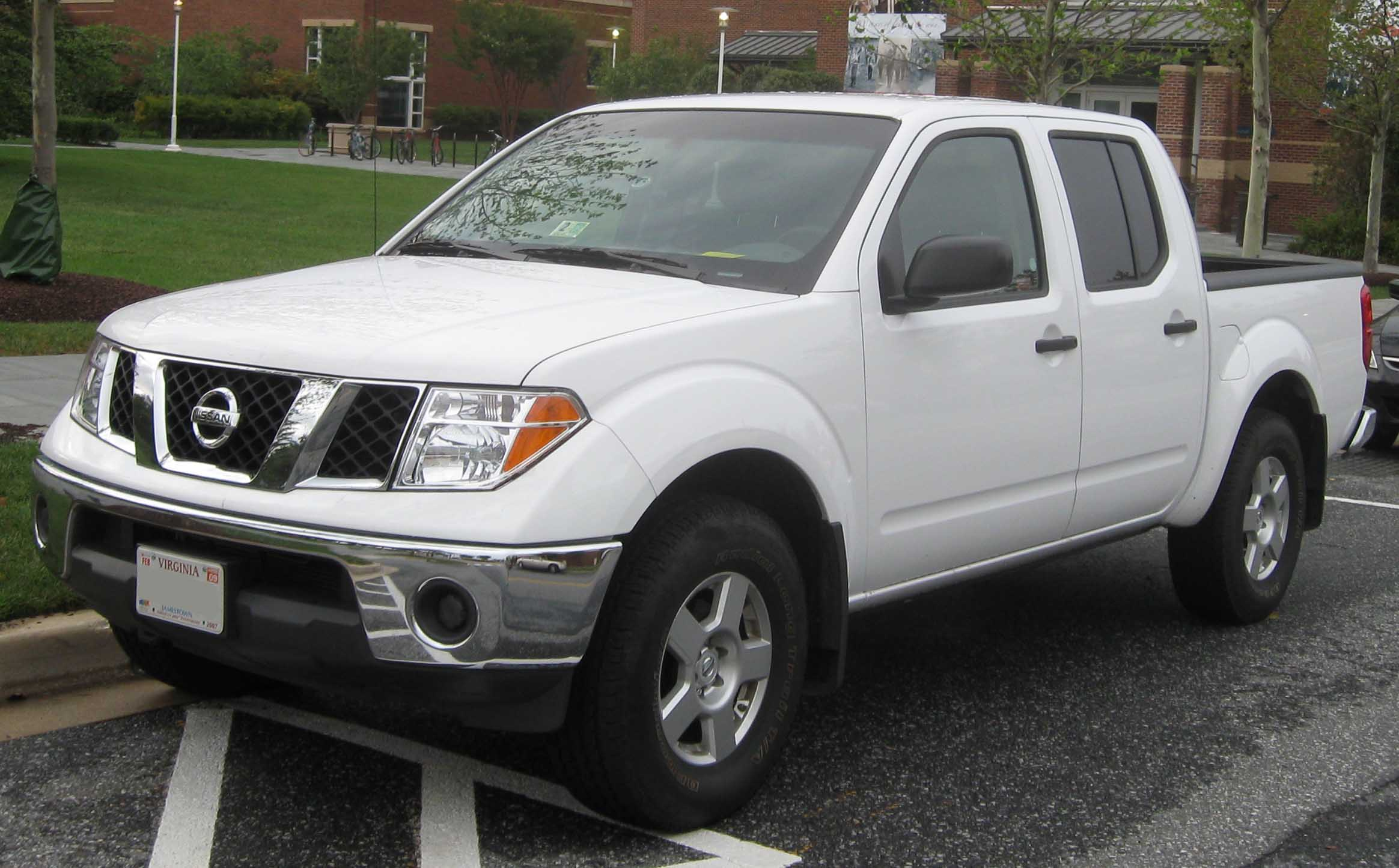
2005–2021 D40 Frontier crew cab (US)

== Third generation (D41; 2022) ==
Third generation
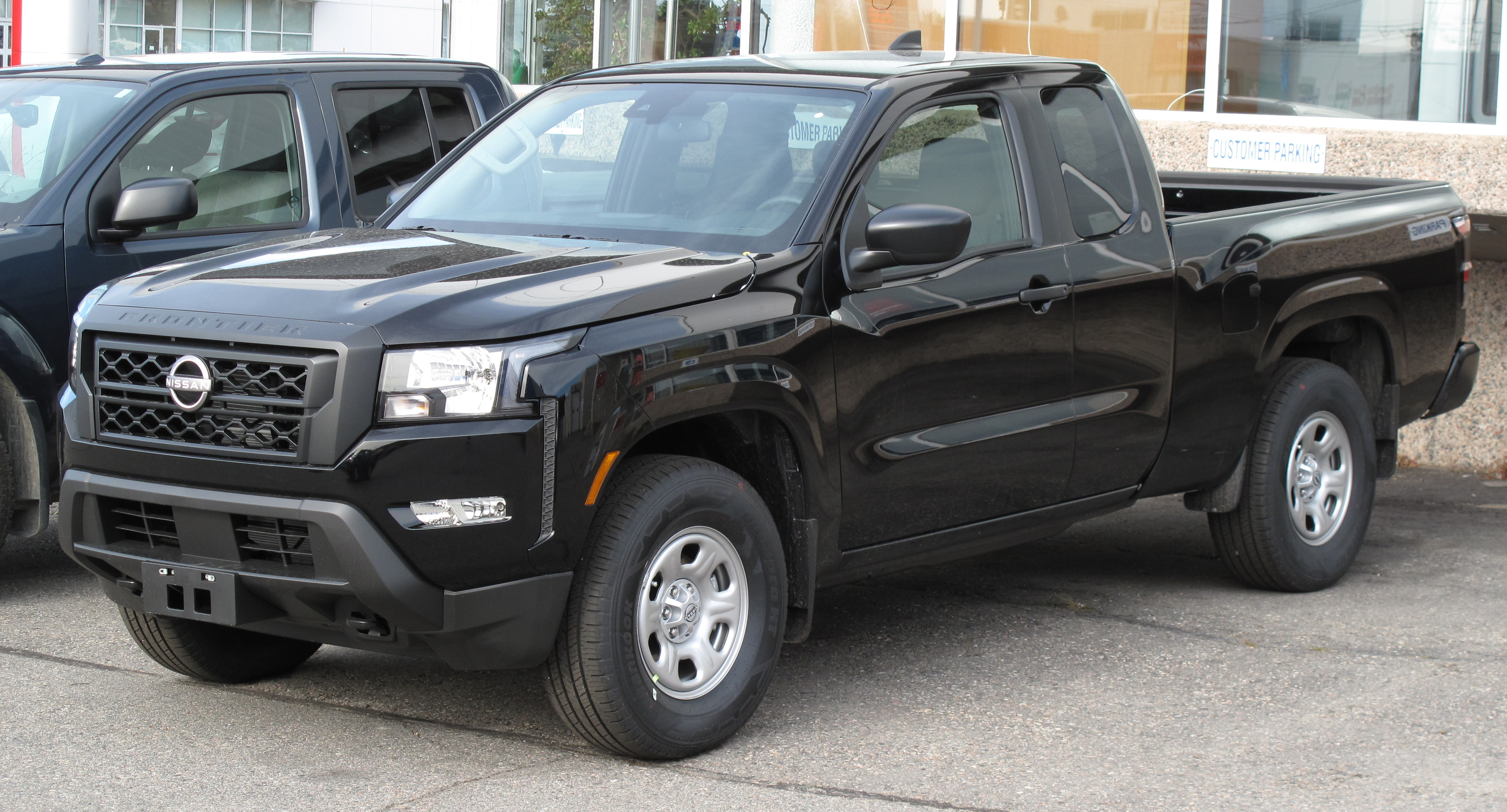
- 2022 Frontier S King Cab Model (D41, Canada)

Overview
- Model code: D41
- Production: July 2021 – present
- Model years: 2022–present
- Assembly: United States: Canton, Mississippi (Nissan USA)

Body and chassis
- Platform: Nissan F-Alpha platform

Powertrain
- Engine: Gasoline: 3.8 L VQ38DD V6
- Power output: 310 hp (231 kW; 314 PS)
- Transmission: Jatco JR913E (9G-Tronic) 9-speed automatic

Dimensions
- Wheelbase: 126.0 in (3,200 mm) (short bed and King Cab); 139.8 in (3,551 mm) (long bed)
- Length: 210.2 in (5,339 mm) (short bed and King Cab); 224.1 in (5,692 mm) (long bed)
- Width: 73.0 in (1,854 mm)
- Height: 72.4 in (1,839 mm)

The first dedicated Frontier model for the North American market, not shared with the global model, was unveiled on February 4, 2021 as the third-generation model for the 2022 model year. The third-generation Frontier is longer by 5 in (13 cm) than the second-generation Frontier. The vehicle rides on a revised high-strength steel ladder frame chassis carried over from the outgoing model. It is offered in extended King Cab and crew-cab layouts with either rear- or four-wheel drive, and five- and six-foot cargo box length options. Nissan initially rated the Frontier as capable of hauling up to 1,610 lb (730 kg) of payload and towing up to 6,720 lb (3,048 kg). For the 2025 model year, the maximum towing capacity was increased to 7,150 lb (3,243 kg).

Trim levels include the base S, SV, and Pro-4X. In the United States, the King Cab (extended cab) is offered with two- or four-wheel drive in either S or SV trim, paired to a 6.1-foot bed. The crew cab is available with two- or four-wheel drive in the S and SV trims, while four-wheel drive is standard on the Pro-4X. In Canada, a two-wheel drive model is not offered, with four-wheel drive being the only option sold, regardless of trim level. The Pro-4X trim receives a rear electronic locking differential, Bilstein off-road shocks, and underbody skid plates as standard.

This version is sold in Mexico alongside the D23 Frontier which has been offered in the country since 2014. Its launch for the Mexican market was confirmed by Nissan's Mexican division on August 9, 2021, as a competitor to the Toyota Tacoma and the Chevrolet Colorado. It is sold under the "Frontier V6 Pro-4X" name to distinguish itself from the D23 Frontier. It went on sale on September 29, 2021. Only the Pro-4X version is offered in Mexico, as the D23 is used for the non-Pro-4X models.

On September 14, 2023 at the 2023 North American International Auto Show in Detroit, Michigan, Nissan introduced two new trim trims of the Frontier for the 2024 model year. The first trim, called the Hardbody Edition, is based on the equipment of the midlevel SV trim, and features retro-inspired seventeen-inch aluminum wheels painted white, as well as retro exterior details inspired by the 1980s Nissan Pickup, commonly referred to as the "Hardbody". The second trim, the SL, returns to the Frontier lineup for 2024 (having previously been available on the previous-generation Frontier model), and replaces the SV Premium Package, featuring the same equipment. Both models are only available in Crew Cab configuration with the short bed.

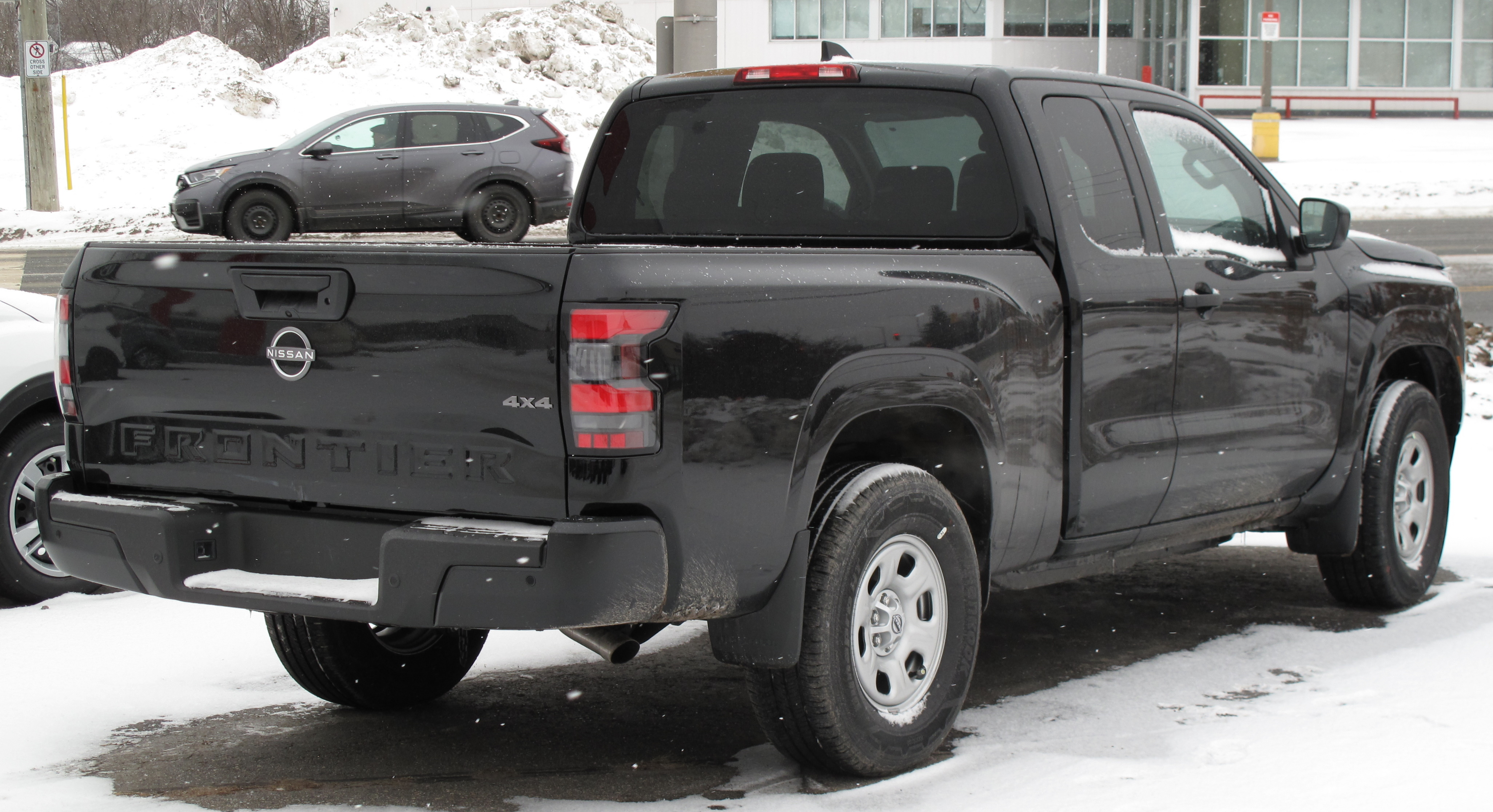
Rear view (King Cab)

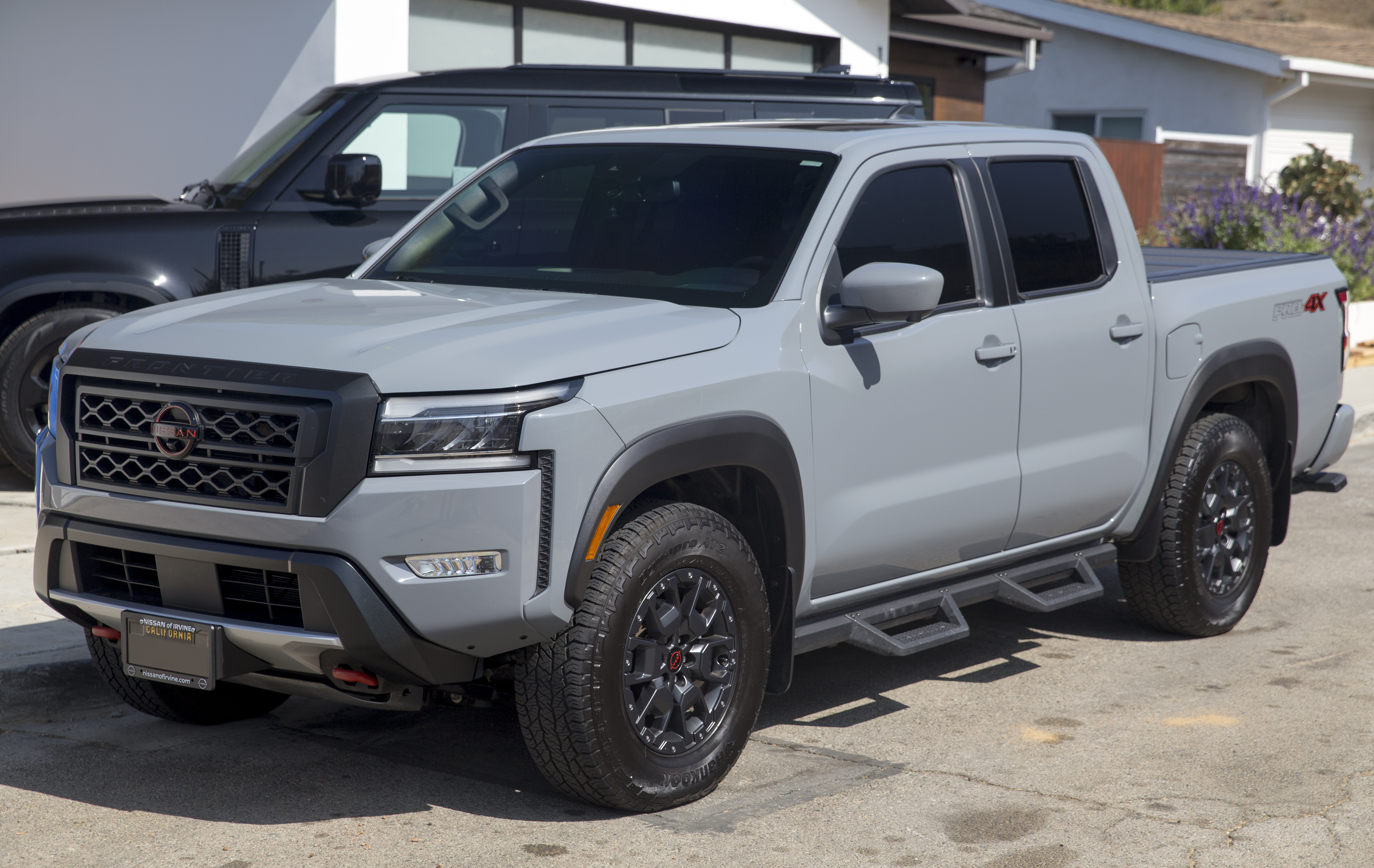
Frontier Pro-4X (front)

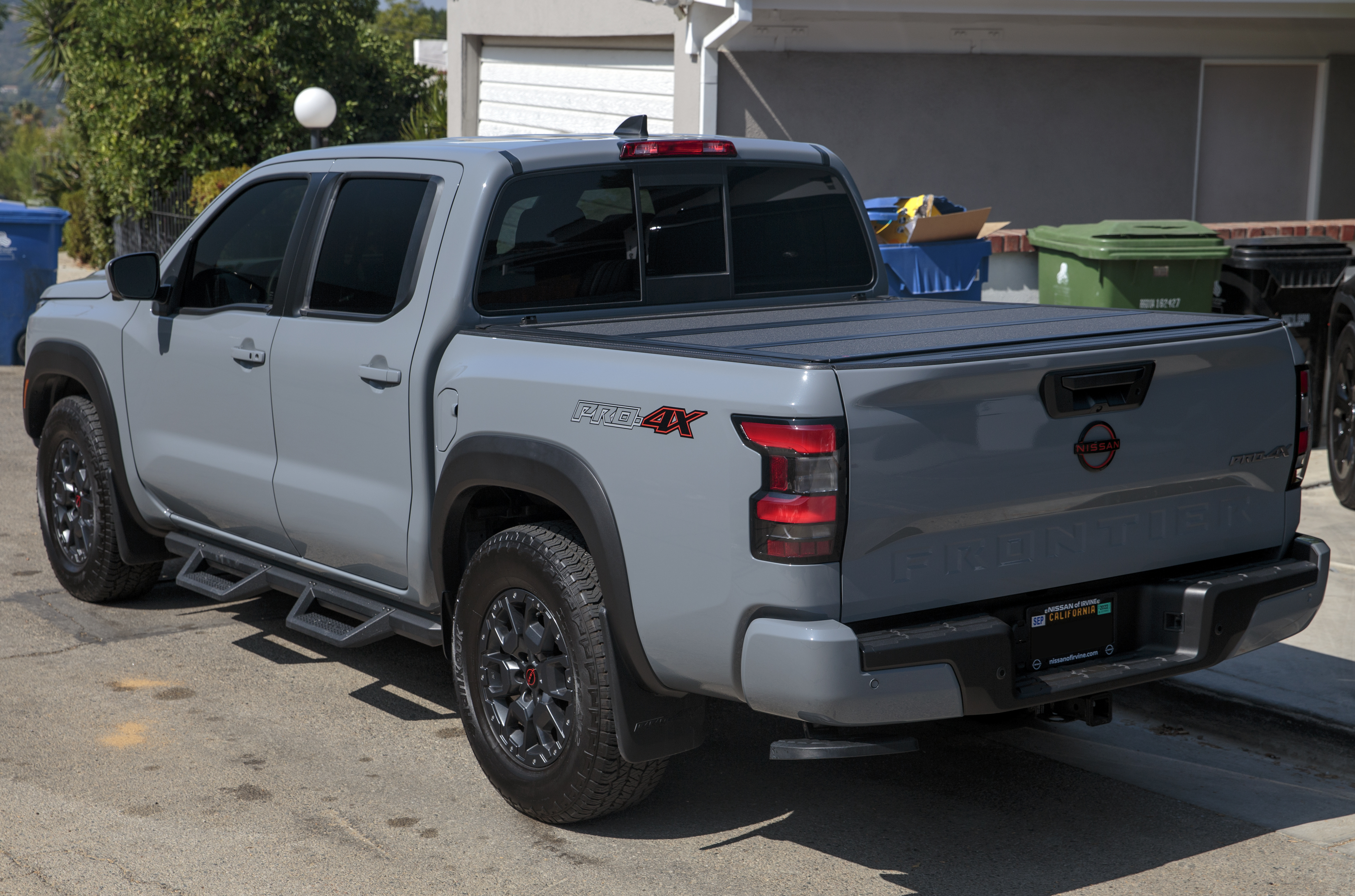
Frontier Pro-4X (rear)

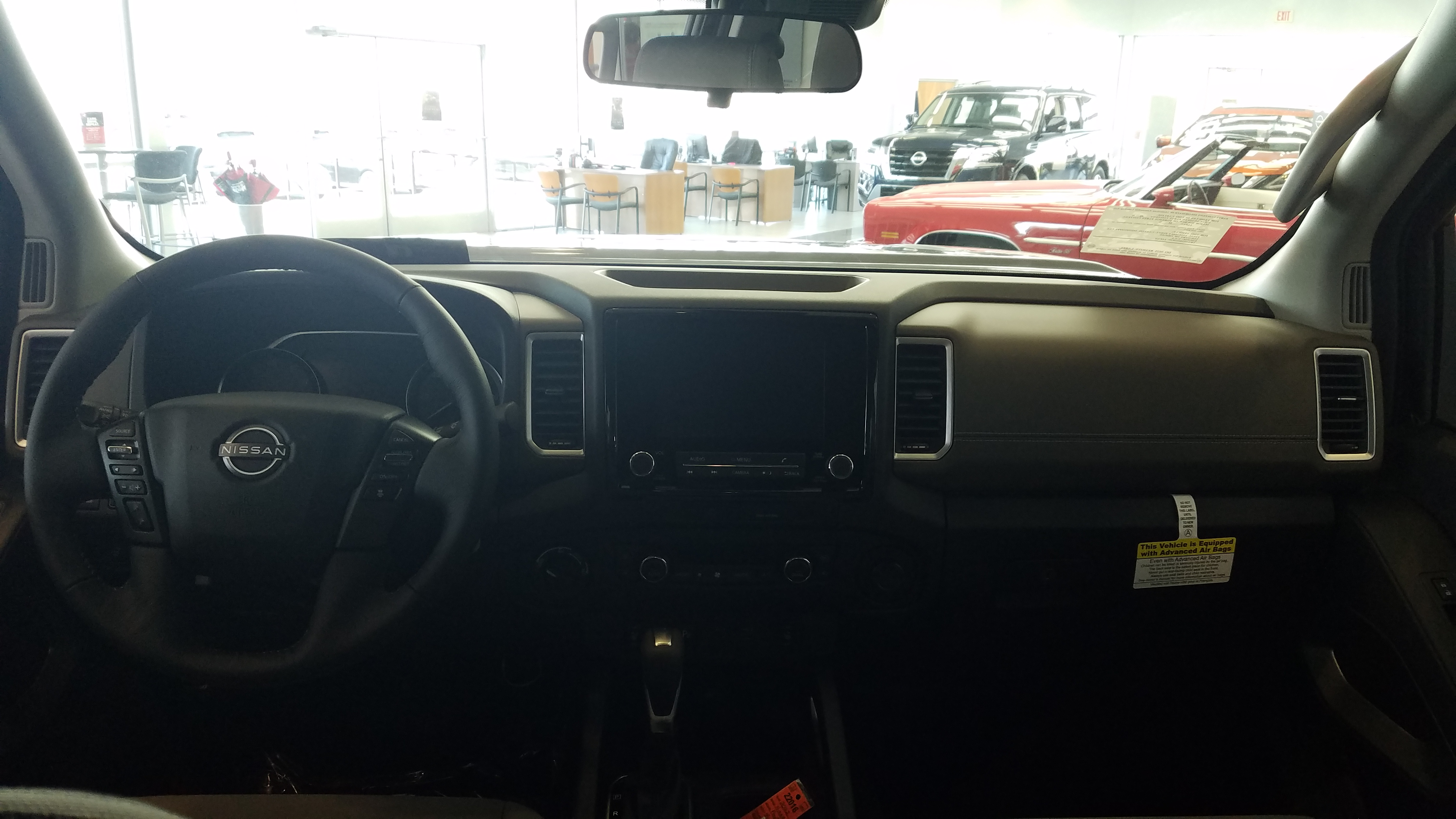
Interior

=== 2025 model year facelift ===
For the 2025 model year, the Frontier received a mid-cycle refresh including a revised front fascia with updated grille and bumper, new 17-inch alloy wheels, and an exclusive Afterburn Orange paint color. Technology upgrades include a standard 12.3-inch touchscreen with wireless Apple CarPlay and Android Auto on all trims, and a telescoping steering wheel standard on SV and higher trims. The long-wheelbase Crew Cab with 6-foot bed is now available on SV, Pro-4X, and SL trims. Safety features such as Lane Departure Warning and Blind Spot Warning are standard across all grades. Maximum towing capacity increased to 7,150 lb. These models reached U.S. dealerships in fall 2024.

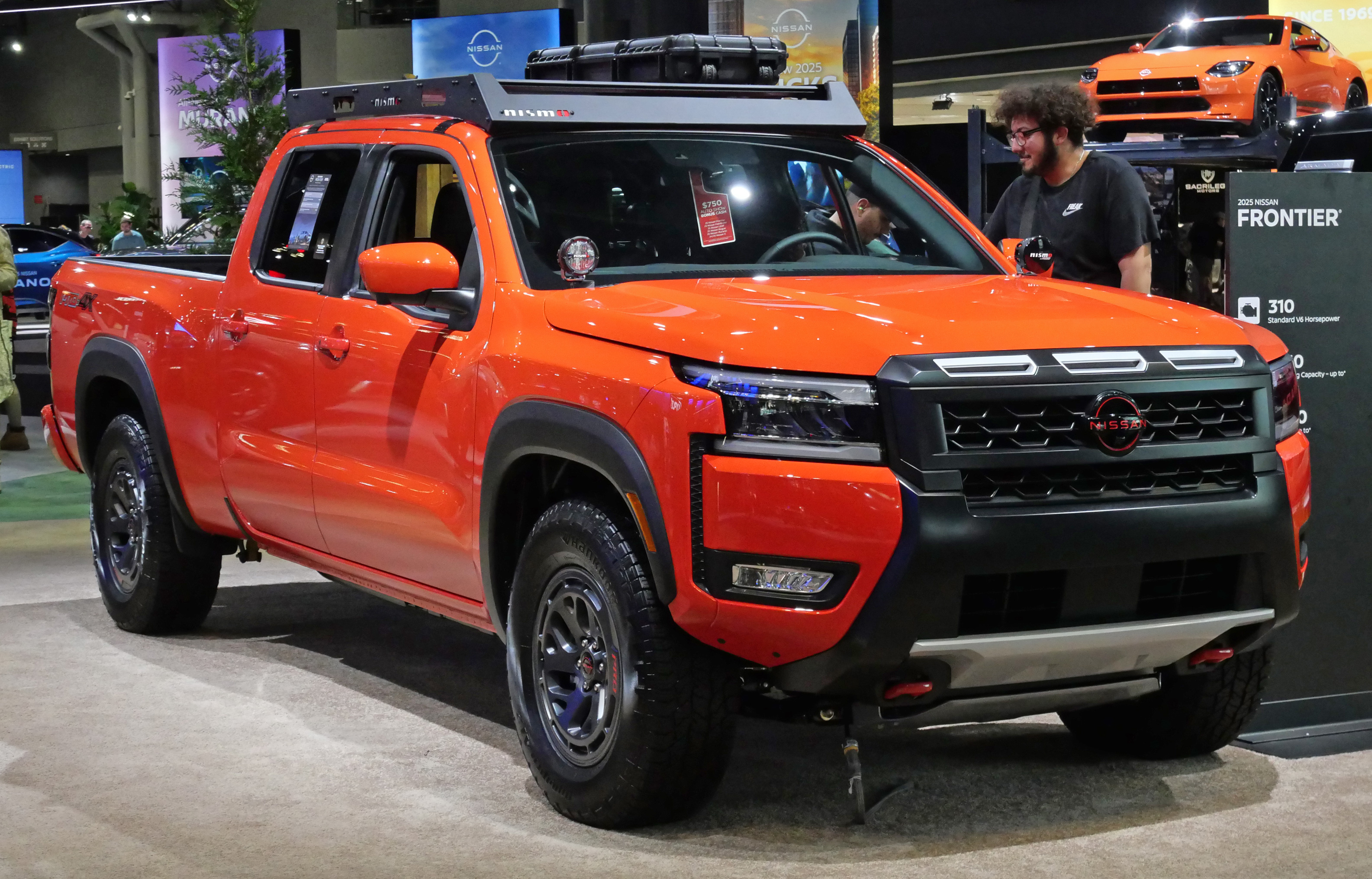
2025 facelift Frontier (front)

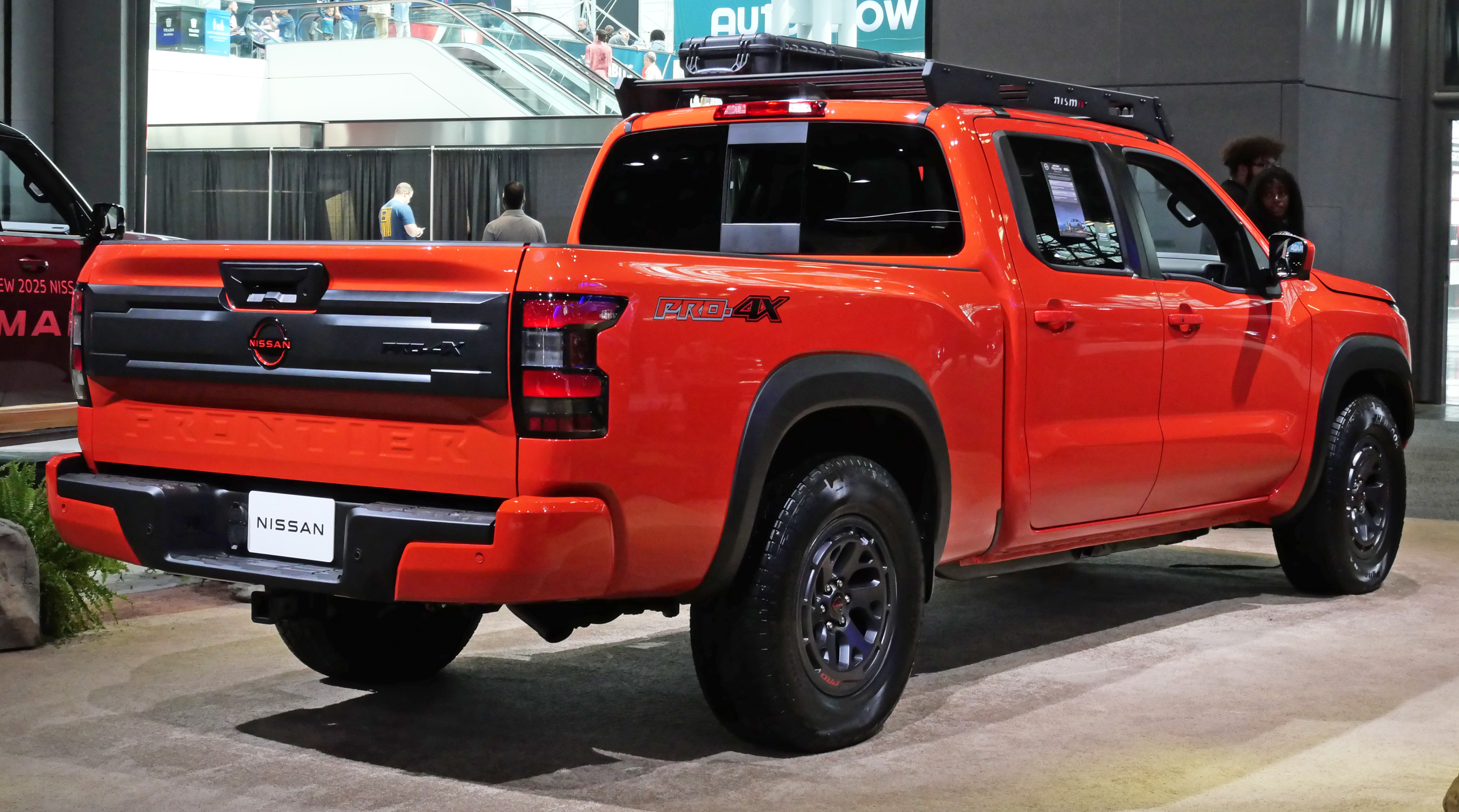
2025 facelift Frontier (rear)

=== Awards and recognition ===
The Nissan Frontier has received several industry awards:

- In 2023 and 2025, Consumer Guide Automotive named the Frontier a "Best Buy" in the midsize pickup category.
- In 2025, Cars.com ranked the Frontier S King Cab 4×2 as the "Best Value" midsize pickup in its annual affordability report.
- The Frontier has been recognized by the Texas Auto Writers Association (TAWA) at its annual Texas Truck Rodeo. It was named "Mid-Size Pickup Truck of Texas" in 2022 and 2023.

=== Safety ratings ===
The Insurance Institute for Highway Safety (IIHS) has tested the third-generation Frontier (2022–present). It received "Good" ratings in the moderate overlap front test and "Acceptable" ratings in the updated side-impact test.

Test	2022	2023	2024	2025
Moderate overlap front	Good	Good	Good	Good
Side impact (updated test)	Acceptable	Acceptable	Acceptable	Acceptable

== Sales ==
Sales figures for the North American Frontier are included in the chart for the main Nissan Frontier/Navara model.
