= Nissan NV (North America) =

Full-size van lineup produced by Nissan (2011-2021)

Nissan NV (F80)
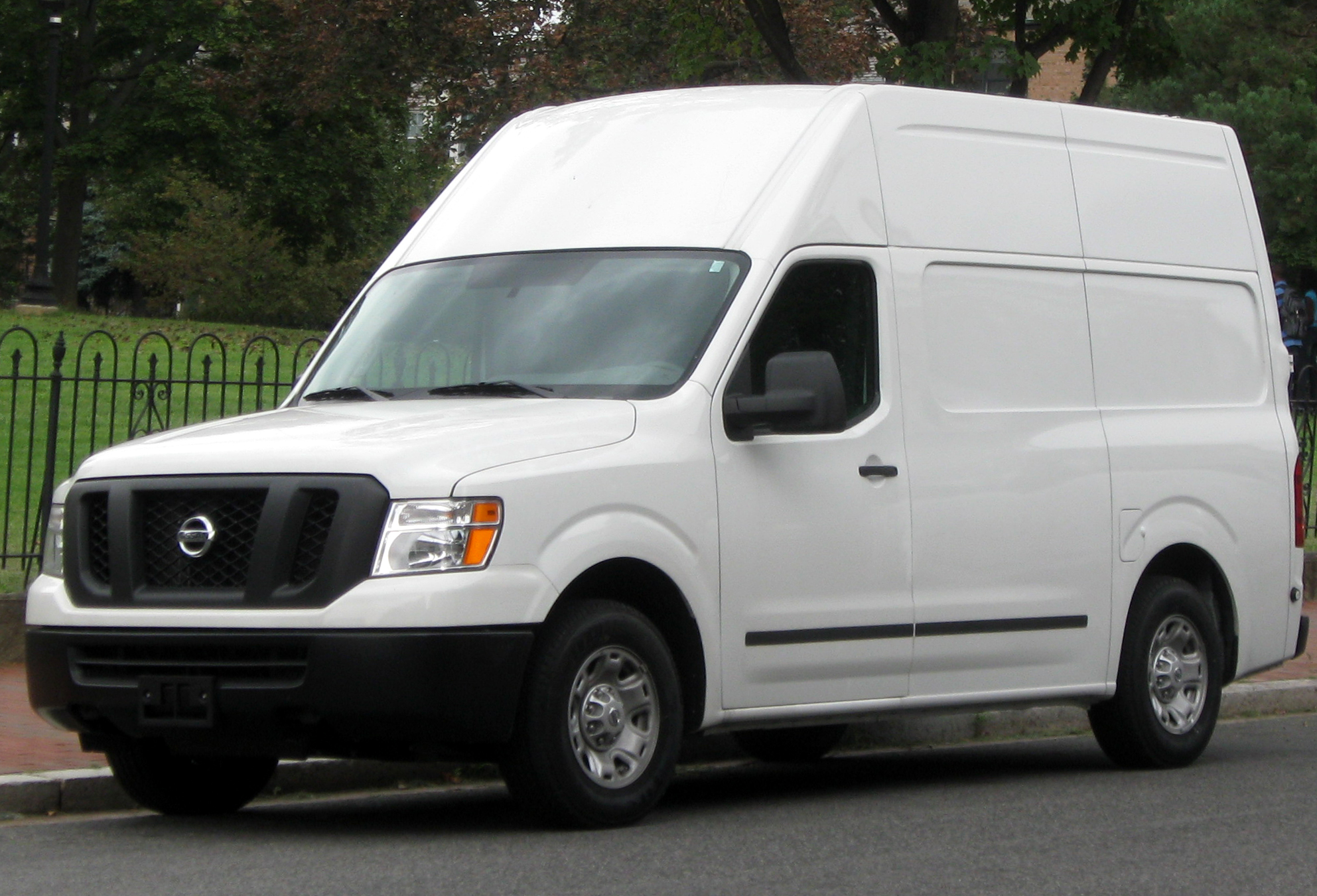
- A Nissan NV2500 HD high-roof van

Overview
- Manufacturer: Nissan
- Also called: Nissan NV1500; Nissan NV2500 HD; Nissan NV3500 HD
- Production: 2011–2021
- Model years: 2012–2021
- Assembly: United States: Canton, Mississippi (Nissan USA); Mexico: Aguascalientes
- Designer: Bryan Thompson (lead exterior design)

Body and chassis
- Class: Full-size van
- Body style: 3-door van 4-door van
- Layout: Front-engine, rear-wheel-drive
- Related: Nissan Titan

Powertrain
- Engine: Gasoline: 4.0 L VQ40DE V6; 5.6 L VK56DE V8 (2012-2016); 5.6 L VK56VD V8 (2017-2021)
- Transmission: 5-speed automatic (V6 & 2012-2016 V8); 7-speed automatic (2017-2021 V8)

Dimensions
- Wheelbase: 146.1 in (3,711 mm)
- Length: 240.6 in (6,111 mm)
- Width: 79.9 in (2,029 mm)
- Height: 83.9 in (2,131 mm); High Roof: 105.0 in (2,667 mm) & 106.0 in (2,692 mm); HD S: 84.9 in (2,156 mm)

The Nissan NV (Nissan Van) is a full-size van produced by Nissan from 2011 to 2021. It was developed and marketed for the United States and Canada, where Nissan had not previously been present in the full-size segment. Until the introduction of the Nissan NV, Mexico was the only country in North America selling a full-size Nissan van, as the Nissan Urvan was sold there.

The NV nameplate was previously used by a small pickup truck sold in Thailand.

== Development ==
The NV used the same F-Alpha platform as does the Nissan Titan full-size pickup, but due to the need for a flat loading floor it is highly modified and they end up sharing mainly powertrain pieces and some of the design language. The NV was also only available with rear-wheel drive, coupled to a five-speed automatic transmission (later also a seven-speed). The NV was not targeted directly at the (mainly fleet) buyers of the Ford E-Series and Chevrolet Express, but rather at private buyers including contractors and small business owners who are looking for a vehicle that is both capable and comfortable.

The 4.0-litre V6 engine outputs 261 hp (195 kW) and 281 lb⋅ft (381 N⋅m) of torque, while the 5.6-litre V8 engine outputs 375 hp (280 kW) and 387 lb⋅ft (525 N⋅m) of torque. The V8-engined versions are also electronically limited to a top speed of 100 mph (161 km/h).

== NV1500 ==
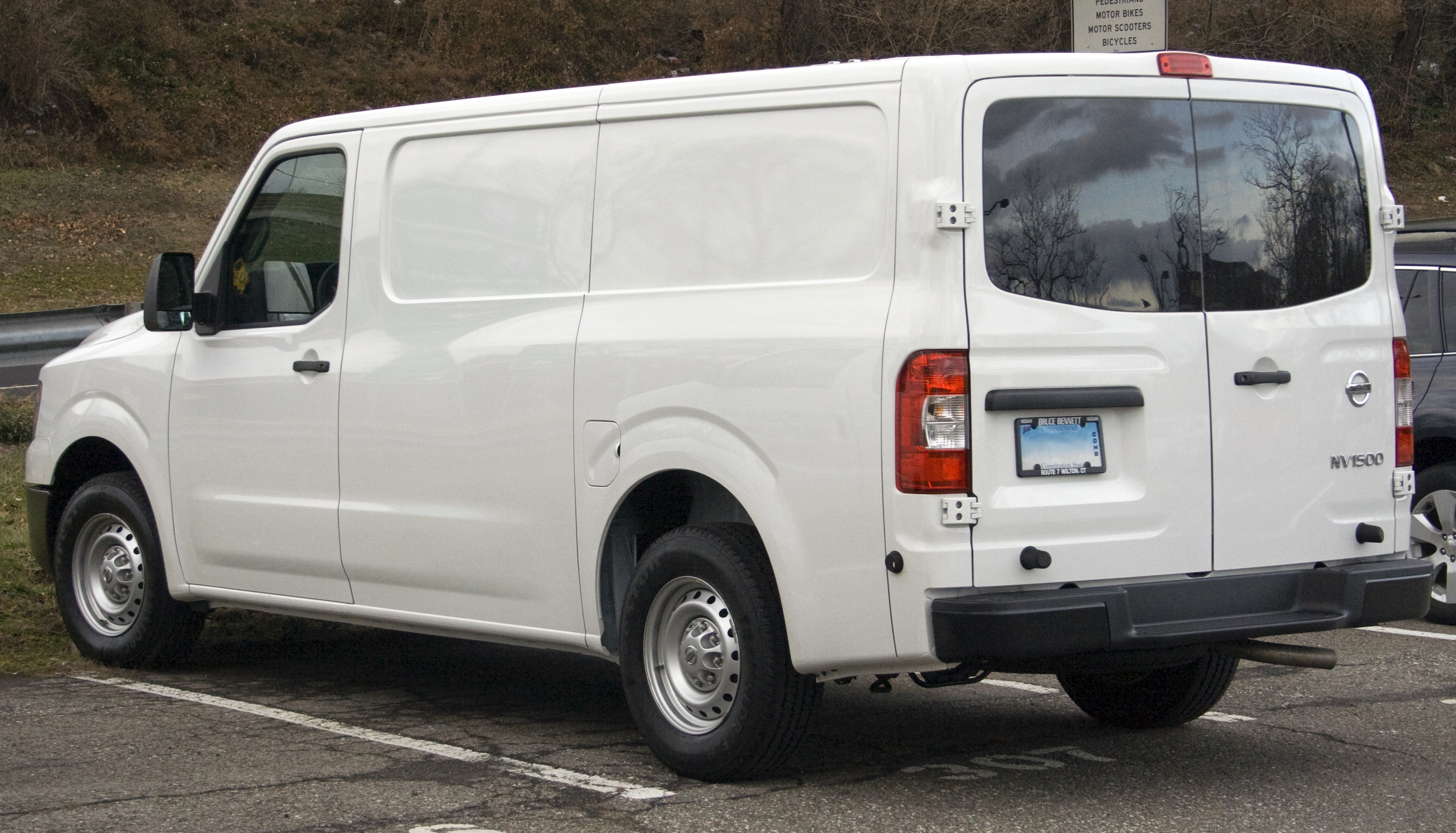
Nissan NV 1500

The NV1500 has a load capacity of 2,590 lb (1,175 kg), similar to the GMC/Chevrolet cargo van using the same "1500" designation, and informally known as a "half-ton". It was only available with the 4-litre V6. It was available in S or SV trim, with the SV receiving power door locks, windows, outside mirrors, and 17" styled steel wheels.

== NV2500 ==
The NV2500 HD (HD for "heavy duty") was equipped with the 4-litre V6 engine, with the bigger V8 available as an option. The payload is 3,142 lb (1,425 kg), similar to the GMC/Chevrolet cargo van using the same "2500" designation, and informally known as a "three-quarter-ton". It came in S, SV, or SL trim levels and was available in low or high roof; the SL was only available with the V8. The SV trim featured a lockable center console with power outlets as well as an additional 120 V outlet in the cargo compartment along with the features from the 1500 SV, while the SL trim added chrome bumpers, grille, and door handles and 17" chrome wheels.

== NV3500 ==
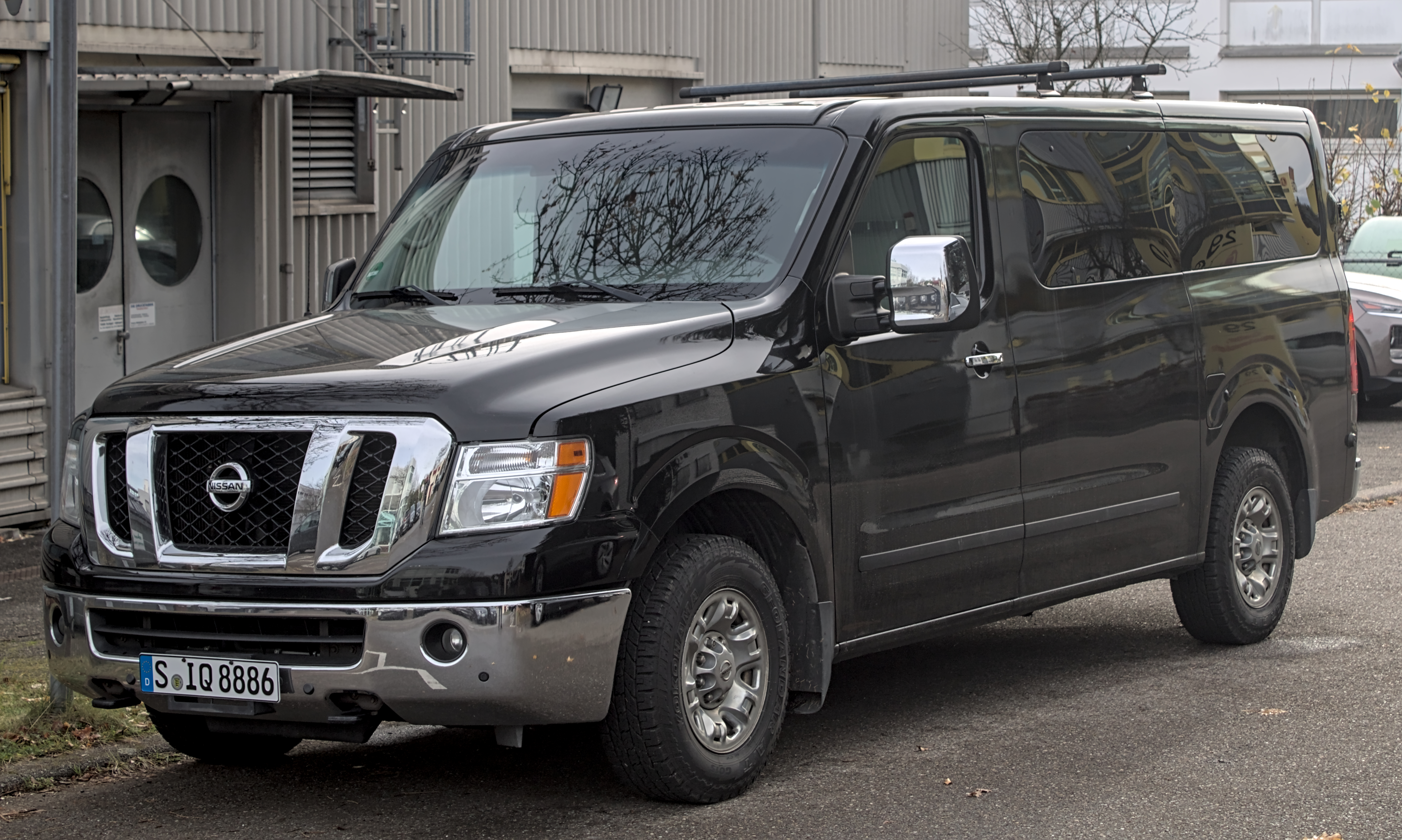
Nissan NV3500

The NV3500 HD was the heaviest weight class offered, and was only available with the large 5.6-litre V8 engine with either a low or a high roof. Payload capacity is 3,925 lb (1,780 kg), similar to the GMC/Chevrolet cargo van using the same "3500" designation, and informally known as a "one-ton".

It was also the only weight class offered in passenger van configuration (with up to 12 seats). Unusually, the latter was offered either with a V6 or a V8, unlike its V8-only cargo counterpart. The NV3500 came in S, SV, or SL trim levels with no high roof available. The NV Passenger has a rollover risk of 30.6%.

== Discontinuation ==
In 2020, Nissan reevaluated its commercial van business in North America, and decided to replace it with a "Business Advantage" program for its other vehicles. Production of the NV full-size vans ended in the middle of 2021, with sales continuing through the end of the year.
