= International Union of Notaries =

UINL
- Union Internacional del Notariado Latino
- Founded: 2 October 1948; 78 years ago
- Founded at: Buenos Aires, Argentina
- Type: Professional association
- Legal status: Union of notary
- Purpose: Private law consensus
- Headquarters: Rome, Italy
- Coordinates: 41°53′N 12°30′E
- Region served: Worldwide
- Members: 92 national notariat associations
- Official languages: English, French, German, Spanish, Italian, Russian
- President: Lionel Galliez
- Main organ: General Assembly
- Website: www.uinl.org

The International Union of Notaries (UINL; Spanish: Union Internacional del Notariado Latino) is a non-governmental organisation. It aims to promote, co-ordinate and develop the function and activities of Notary throughout the world.

== Background ==
Most of the nations in the world use a legal system that is based on either the civil law tradition or the common law tradition. The civil law tradition evolved from the given law of antiquity through Roman Law, the Codes of Theodosius and Justinian, the Salic Code and the Code of Napoleon. That tradition is the foundation of the legal systems of continental Europe, francophone Africa, South America and Middle Eastern countries that were under French dominion such as Egypt, Lebanon and Syria, While the legal systems of China and Japan did not evolve from the same given law as did the civil law, they developed legal systems that are functionally similar to the civil law tradition. In the civil law tradition, all law flows from a coherent set of legal principles contained in a written code provided or enacted by the sovereign. The civil law tradition has been described as “anything that is not permitted is prohibited”. While scholars have found traces of the common law tradition in ancient Roman law, the common law tradition essentially derives from the merging of the Saxon and Norman legal systems after William I conquered England in 1066. The common law tradition is the foundation of the legal systems of Great Britain (except Scotland), the United States (except Louisiana and Puerto Rico), Canada, Australia, Cyprus, India, Pakistan and Anglophone Africa. In the commonlaw tradition, law is developed through the decisions of judges made in resolving actual cases. The common law tradition has been described as “anything that is not prohibited is permitted.” At the beginning of the twenty-first century, the each legal tradition is increasingly adopting essential features of the other legal system. The law of the common law systems is becoming more statutory. The law of the civil law systems is being made increasingly in judicial decisions and interpretations of civil code provisions. The civil law notary is but another feature of the civil law tradition that is receiving increasingly serious consideration in common law jurisdictions.

== Organization naming and etymology ==
The organization's Spanish name Union Internacional del Notariado Latino references the civil law notary tradition. Ancient Rome's Codex Justinianus played big part in shaping the laws of civil law countries which originated in Continental Europe and extended to their colonies overseas, including but not limited to Latin America and several Spanish and Portuguese colonies-states which is later known as Latin countries. Since twentieth century, with the independence of many states formerly occupied or colonised by Continental Europe an countries and the opening up of Japan, World War II and subsequent decolonisation of remaining colonised territories, the Cold War and the fall of Soviet Union and subsequent formation of the Russian Federation, also the United States thaw with China, has influenced the practice of civil law and its notaries to become more widespread, beginning with European colonisation in sixtieth until ninetieth century in which time the European rule forced indigenous people in several territories into following European Continental civil law, and then with Japan moving to a more civil law-centric policies, decolonisation during World War II that left many previously colonised countries to gain independence and still has civil law policies in place, adding more countries exercising civil law policies, China thaw that move China a civil law communist state, thus creating the UINL as a professional union between civil law countries becomes inevitable. The UINL now acts as an umbrella organisation for all the publicly authorised notaries in the world rather than just those from Latin countries, but the acronym UINL has nevertheless been retained.

== Aims ==
- Promote and apply the fundamental principles of the civil law notarial system and the principles of notarial deontology;
- Represent the notariat at and co-operate with international organisations;
- Collaborate with national bodies and institutional authorities in every country;
- Study law in the field of notarial activities and co-operate to harmonise national legislations at international level;
- Promote, organise and develop vocational training and support scientific works in the notarial field;
- Study and systematically gather legislation on the civil law notarial institution;
- Promote international congresses, conferences and meetings.

== History and bodies ==
Formed by 19 countries at the time of its establishment in 1948, the organisation includes 92 countries, of which 22 out of the 28 member countries of the European Union and 15 out of the 19 countries of the G20, thus showing the expansion of the Continental legal system. Today this system is in place in almost 120 countries, totalling 2/3 of the world population and accounting for over 60% of world gross domestic product.

Directed by a steering committee formed by 28 councillors, the decision-making body is the General Meeting of member notariats where each country has one vote regardless of its importance. It also includes a General Council formed by 172 members and continental and intercontinental commissions working from the scientific (vocational training and research), strategic (development), economic (networks and activities) and sociological (human rights and social protection) standpoints.

The UINL has a board of directors which acts as the executive force within the body, a General Council within the body whose role is to make proposals, an Assembly of the member-notary-bodies and a large number of commissions and commissioners including continental commissions and commissioners for African, American and European affairs, various inter-continental commissions and commissioners including those on human rights, ethics, public relations, and the International Notarial Cooperation Commission (C.C.N.I.)

== Presidency ==
The union elects a President of the union at General Assembly of member notariats, the institutional meeting of the International Union of Notaries, for three years term. To be eligible for election, a candidate must be a notary from one of the active member notariats. The current president of the union is Lionel Galliez, French notary, elected at the 30th Congress General Assembly in November 2021.

== Membership ==
World Map by UINL Membership as of May 2020. active members non-members

Membership consists of notariats from civil law sovereign states or non-sovereign states. Quebec and the City of London are members instead of Canada and United Kingdom because of the presence of notariats in these regions, something uncommon in common law states. Although there is also notaries in other common law states such as Michigan in the United States, but their duty differ at varying degree in terms of certification of legal documents, where the notary is an extended hand of the Secretary of State for legalization of any documents. In the states of Alabama and Florida, under Alabama Code 1975§ 36-20-50 et. seq. and Florida State § 118.10, juncto Florida ADC 1C-18.001 et. seq., existing statute that enable civil law notaries may allow those states to join the UINL as a non-independent state member, similar to Quebec and London, but so far none of those states joined. Thus no state in the United States and only one territory (Puerto Rico) is certified as a member of UINL. In their line of work, their operation is similar to the continental European notaries. Lebanon and Belarus are the most recent members, joined in 2018 and 2019, respectively. The list of the members is as follows:

- Albania
- Algeria
- Andorra
- Argentina
- Armenia
- Austria
- Belarus
- Belgium
- Benin
- Bolivia
- Bosnia and Herzegovina
- Brazil
- Bulgaria
- Burkina Faso
- Cameroon
- Central African Republic
- Chad
- Chile
- China
- Colombia
- Congo
- Costa Rica
- Côte d'Ivoire
- Croatia
- Cuba
- Czech Republic
- Dominican Republic
- Ecuador
- El Salvador
- Estonia
- France
- Gabon
- Georgia
- Germany
- Greece
- Guatemala
- Guinea
- Haiti
- Honduras
- Hungary
- Indonesia
- Italy
- Japan
- Kosovo
- Latvia
- Lebanon
- Lithuania
- City of London (United Kingdom)
- Luxembourg
- Madagascar
- Mali
- Malta
- Mauritania
- Mauritius
- Mexico
- Monaco
- Mongolia
- Montenegro
- Morocco
- Netherlands
- Nicaragua
- Niger
- Panama
- Paraguay
- Peru
- Poland
- Puerto Rico (United States)
- Portugal
- Quebec (Canada)
- South Korea
- Republic of Moldova
- Republic of North Macedonia
- Romania
- Russian Federation
- San Marino
- Senegal
- Serbia
- Slovakia
- Slovenia
- Spain
- Switzerland
- Togo
- Tunisia
- Turkey
- Ukraine
- Uruguay
- Vatican City
- Venezuela
- Vietnam

== See also ==
- National Notary Association
