= Nissan USA =

Subsidiary of Nissan Motor Corporation

Nissan North America, Inc.
- Type: Subsidiary
- Founded: 1960; 66 years ago; in Gardena, California, U.S.
- Headquarters: One Nissan Way, Franklin, Tennessee, 37067, U.S.
- Area served: North America
- Key people: Mike Colleran, Senior vice-president Jeremie Papin, Chairman
- Products: Nissan, Infiniti and Nismo product brands in the United States
- Number of employees: 21,000 (including 16,000 manufacturing employees)
- Parent: Nissan Motor Corporation
- Subsidiaries: List: Sales and service: Nissan Canada, Inc.; Nissan Mexicana, S.A. De C.V.; Design and Research and Development: Nissan Technical Center North America; Nissan Technical Center North America - Mexico; Nissan Design America; Manufacturing facilities: Nissan North America, Inc. - U.S. Manufacturing; Nissan Mexicana, S.A. De C.V. (Manufacturing); Finance:'; Nissan Canada Inc. (Finance division); Nissan Motor Acceptance Corp.; NR Finance Mexico, S.A. de C.V. SOFOM ER
- Website: nissanusa.com

Nissan North America, Inc., doing business as Nissan USA, is the North American headquarters, and a wholly owned subsidiary of Nissan Motor Corporation of Japan. The company manufactures and sells Nissan and Infiniti brand cars, sport utility vehicles and pickup trucks through a network of approximately 1,082 Nissan and 211 Infiniti dealers in the United States, including 187 independent Nissan dealerships, 38 Infiniti retailers and 45 Nissan Commercial Vehicle dealers in Canada. The Tennessee location is Nissan's second headquarter office after leaving Gardena, California, in 2005, having occupied the location for nearly 50 years.

== Alliance ==
- Renault–Nissan–Mitsubishi Alliance

== Holdings ==
=== Sales and service ===
- Nissan Canada, Inc.
- Nissan North America, Inc. (National headquarters)
- Nissan Mexicana, S.A. De C. V. (Operational support)

=== Research and Development ===
- Nissan North America, Inc. (Nissan Technical Center North America)
- Nissan North America, Inc. (Nissan Technical Center North America - Mexico)
- Nissan North America, Inc. (Nissan Research Center - Silicon Valley)

=== Design ===
- Nissan North America, Inc. (Nissan Design America)

=== Manufacturing ===
- Nissan North America, Inc. - U.S. Manufacturing (Smyrna)
- Nissan North America, Inc. - U.S. Manufacturing (Canton)
- Nissan North America, Inc. - U.S. Manufacturing (Battery Plant)
- Nissan North America, Inc. - U.S. Manufacturing (Decherd)
- Nissan North America, Inc. (Infiniti Powertrain Plant - Decherd)
- Nissan Mexicana, S.A. De C.V. (Cuernavaca)
- Nissan Mexicana, S.A. De C.V. (Aguascalientes 1 Plant)
- Nissan Mexicana, S.A. De C.V. (Aguascalientes 2 Plant)
- Nissan Mexicana, S.A. De C.V. (Nissan Powertrain Plant)

=== Finance ===
- Nissan Canada Inc. (Finance division)
- Nissan Motor Acceptance Corp. (Franklin)
- Nissan Motor Acceptance Corp. (Irving)
- NR Finance Mexico, S.A. de C.V. SOFOM ER

== Brands ==
=== Nissan ===
==== Current Nissan products ====
The following is a list of Nissan models are currently available in the North American market

- Altima
- Armada
- Frontier
- Kicks
- Leaf
- Murano
- Pathfinder
- Rogue
- Rogue PHEV
- Sentra
- Z

==== Former Nissan products ====
- 240SX
- 300ZX
- 350Z
- 370Z
- Ariya
- Cube
- GT-R
- Juke
- Maxima
- Murano CrossCabriolet
- NV
- NV200
- Quest
- Rogue Sport
- Stanza
- Titan/Titan XD
- Versa
- Xterra

=== Infiniti ===
==== Current Infiniti products ====
The following is a list of Infiniti models are currently available in the North American market:

- QX60 (3.5)
- QX65 (Crossover SUV)
- QX80 (SUV)

==== Former Infiniti products ====
- EX35 and EX37 (SUV)
- FX35, FX37, FX45, and FX50 (SUV)
- G20 (sedan) P10/P11
- G25, G35, and G37 (sedan) V35/V36
- G35 and G37 (coupe and convertible) V35/V36
- I30 and I35 (sedan)
- J30 (sedan)
- M30 (coupe and convertible)
- M35/M45 (sedan)
- Q30 (hatchback)
- QX30 (Base, Luxury, Premium, and Sport)
- Q40 (sedan)
- Q45 (sedan)
- Q50 (Q50 3.0t Luxe, 3.0t Sensory, Red Sport 400)
- Q70/Q70L (sedan)
- QX4 (SUV)
- QX50 (Crossover SUV)
- QX55
- QX56 (SUV)
- QX70 (3.7, 3.7 AWD, 5.0 AWD)
