= Nissan Titan =

Pickup truck line by Nissan (2004–2024)

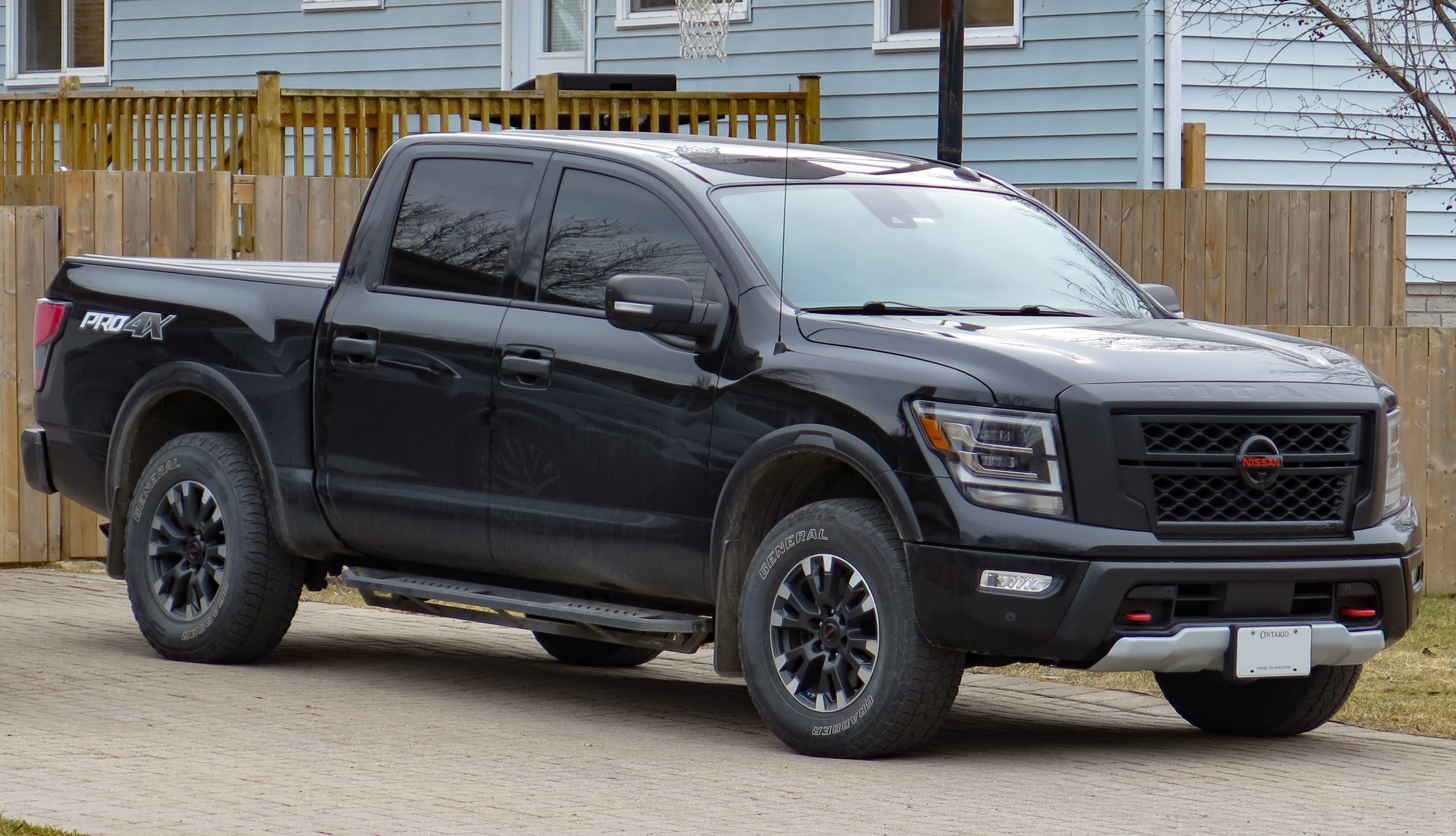
- 2021 Nissan Titan Crew Cab PRO-4X (Canada)

Overview
- Manufacturer: Nissan
- Production: September 2003 – November 2024
- Model years: 2004–2024
- Assembly: United States: Canton, Mississippi (Nissan North America)

Body and chassis
- Class: Full-size pickup truck
- Body style: 2-door pickup truck 4-door pickup truck
- Layout: Front-engine, rear-wheel-drive / four-wheel-drive
- Platform: Nissan F-Alpha

The Nissan Titan is a full-size pickup truck that was manufactured by Nissan USA in Canton, Mississippi for the North American market from September 2003 to November 2024 over two generations. The first generation was produced for the 2004-2015 model years (MY), with an intermediate refresh for MY 2008. The second generation was made for MY 2016-2024, with production beginning in November 2015 and an intermediate refresh for MY 2020. Both generations have an extended cab or crew cab design, with the second-generation also having a two-door regular cab variant. The Titan has a V8 engine which is mounted in the front and either rear-wheel drive or four-wheel drive, with the second generation adding a diesel engine alongside a revised version of the gasoline engine used in the first generation.

== First generation (A60; 2004) ==
First generation
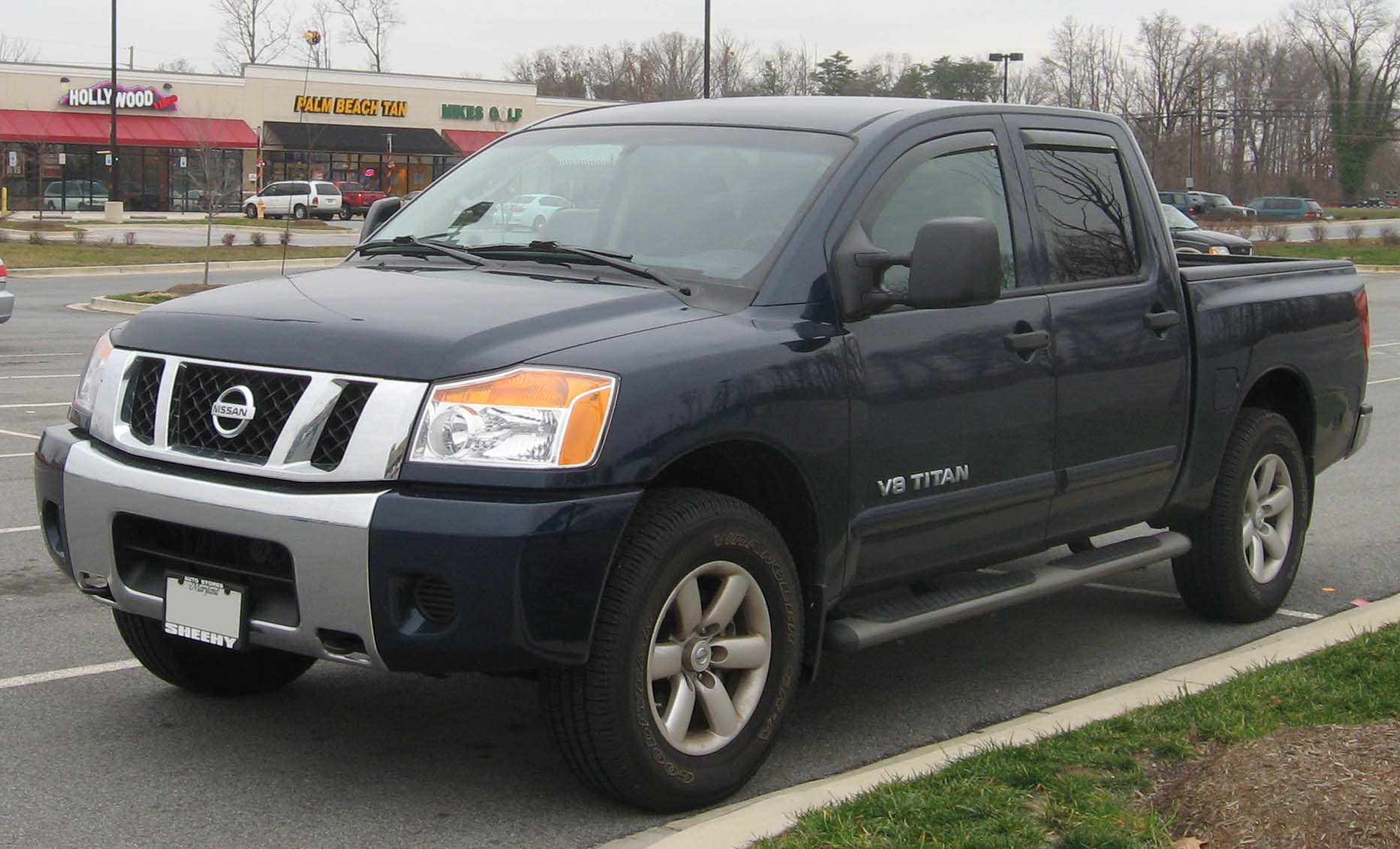
- 2008 Nissan Titan

Overview
- Model code: A60
- Production: September 2003–November 2015
- Model years: 2004–2015
- Designer: Giovanny Arroba (2000); Diane Allen (2001)

Body and chassis
- Related: Infiniti QX56; Nissan Frontier; Nissan Armada

Powertrain
- Engine: 5.6 L VK56DE V8
- Transmission: 5-speed automatic Jatco RE5R05A transmission

Dimensions
- Wheelbase: SWB: 139.8 in (3,551 mm); LWB: 159.4 in (4,049 mm)
- Length: 2004-07: 224.2 in (5,695 mm); 2008-15 SWB: 224.6 in (5,705 mm); LWB: 244.3 in (6,205 mm)
- Width: 2004-07: 78.8 in (2,002 mm); 2008-15: 79.5 in (2,019 mm)
- Height: 2004-07 King Cab 4WD: 76.6 in (1,946 mm); 2004-07 Crew Cab 4WD: 76.7 in (1,948 mm); 2004-07 King Cab 2WD: 75.0 in (1,905 mm); 2004-07 Crew Cab 2WD: 75.1 in (1,908 mm); 2008-15 King Cab 4WD SWB: 76.1 in (1,933 mm); King Cab 4WD LWB: 76.0 in (1,930 mm); 2008-15 Crew Cab SWB: 74.7 in (1,897 mm); Pro-4X King Cab 4x4 SWB: 76.6 in (1,946 mm); 2008-15 LE King Cab 4x4 SWB: 76.4 in (1,941 mm); 2008-15 King Cab 2WD SWB: 74.6 in (1,895 mm); LE King Cab 2WD SWB: 74.8 in (1,900 mm)
- Curb weight: 5,038 lb (2,285 kg)

Development of the Titan began in September 1999, with design work under Diane Allen. Giovanny Arroba's TA60 exterior was chosen in late 2000, with a final production freeze in July 2001. The design language of the future truck was previewed by the 2001 Alpha T concept shown at the 2001 North American International Auto Show, which had previously developed through November 2000.

Production began on September 21, 2003, and sales on December 1, 2003. The Titan used Nissan's new full-size F-Alpha platform. This new platform was shared with the Nissan Armada and Infiniti QX56 SUVs, with all three manufactured in Canton, Mississippi, United States. The first generation Titan continued without a major redesign through 2015.

=== Specifications ===
==== Models and equipment ====
All models come standard with a 32-valve, 5.6-liter engine, VK56DE, which generates 317 hp (236 kW) (305 hp or 227 kW on 2004–2007 models) and 385 lb⋅ft (522 N⋅m) of torque. The first generation Titan came equipped with a fully boxed ladder frame and was available in either rear-wheel drive or a shift-on-the-fly four-wheel-drive system coupled with a five-speed RE5R05A automatic transmission. An automatic brake-limited slip (ABLS) system was available on all Titans. The first generation was available as a King Cab (extended cab) or a crew cab with a full-sized back seat, with no regular cab being offered. The King Cab featured a 6-foot-7-inch (2.01 m) bed, while the crew cab had a 5-foot-7-inch (1.70 m) bed. In 2008, a longer wheelbase model was offered with either an 8-foot-3-inch (2.51 m) bed on the King Cab or a 7-foot-3-inch (2.21 m) bed on the crew cab. There were originally three trim levels available: XE, SE, and LE, each available with an Off-Road package on 4x4 models. The Pro-4X trim was introduced for the 2008 model year (4WD only). For the 2011 model year, all trim levels were updated - XE became S, SE became SV, and LE became SL, and the Pro-4X trim remained. The S was the base model, the SV a mid-level model with more features, the Pro-4X was the off-road-oriented version, and the top level SL was offered with features like 20-inch alloy wheels as standard equipment.

==== Features ====
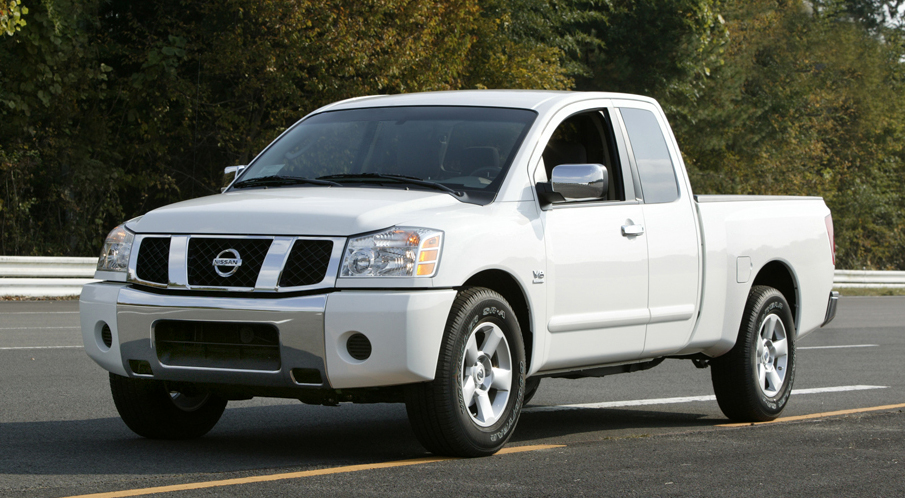
2004 Nissan Titan King Cab

Features available on the first generation included:

- Bluetooth hands-free
- Navigation system
- DVD player with screen
- Side airbags
- Pro-4X off-road package
- Traction control
- Sunroof
- Big tow package with transmission temperature gauge and telescoping mirrors
- XM Satellite Radio
- Leather split power bench seat
- Utili-Track bed rail system
- Lockable bedside storage box
- Leather-appointed heated captain's chairs with console automatic shifter
- Rear sonar warning system
- Automatic windows down with key fob
- Power adjustable pedals
- Flex fuel
- 168-degree king cab rear door openings

==== Safety ====
The first generation Titan carried a five-star rating from the National Highway Traffic Safety Administration for driver frontal crash, and a four-star rating for passenger frontal crash.

- Vehicle dynamic control standard on 2010 models and up
- Side and front airbags standard on 2010 models and up
- Antilock brakes standard on all

=== 2008 refresh ===
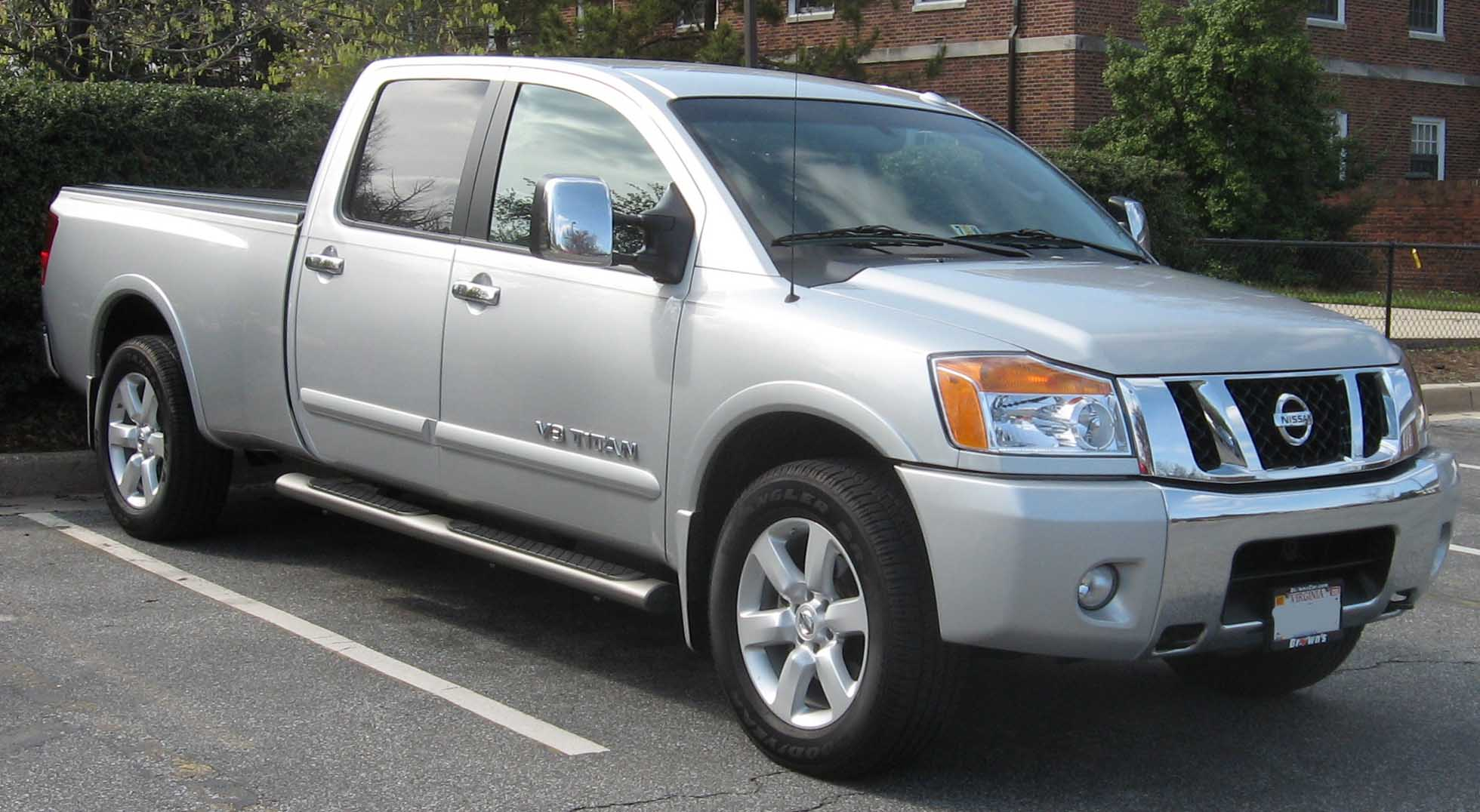
2008 Nissan Titan crew cab long bed

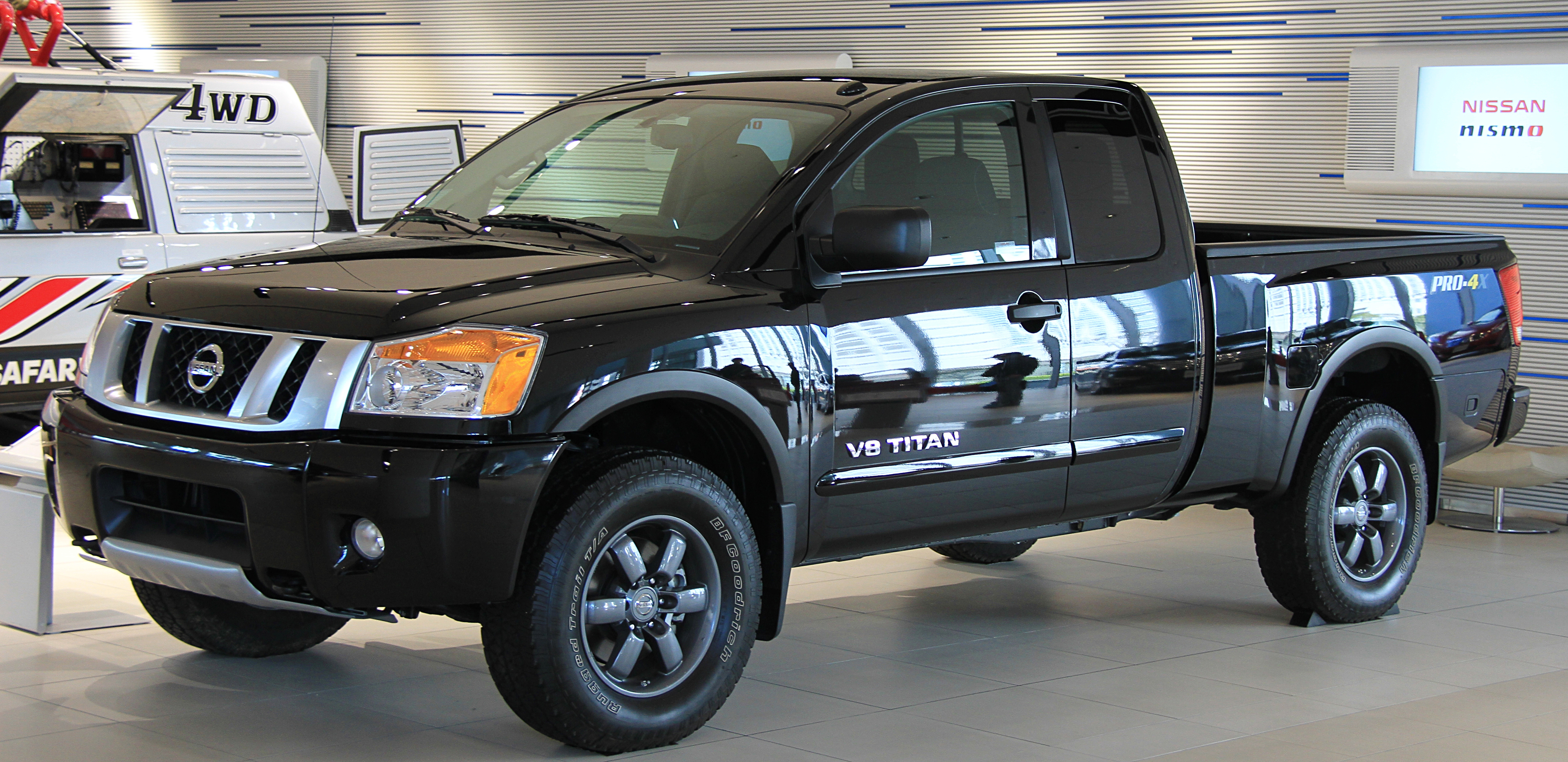
Nissan Titan Pro-4X

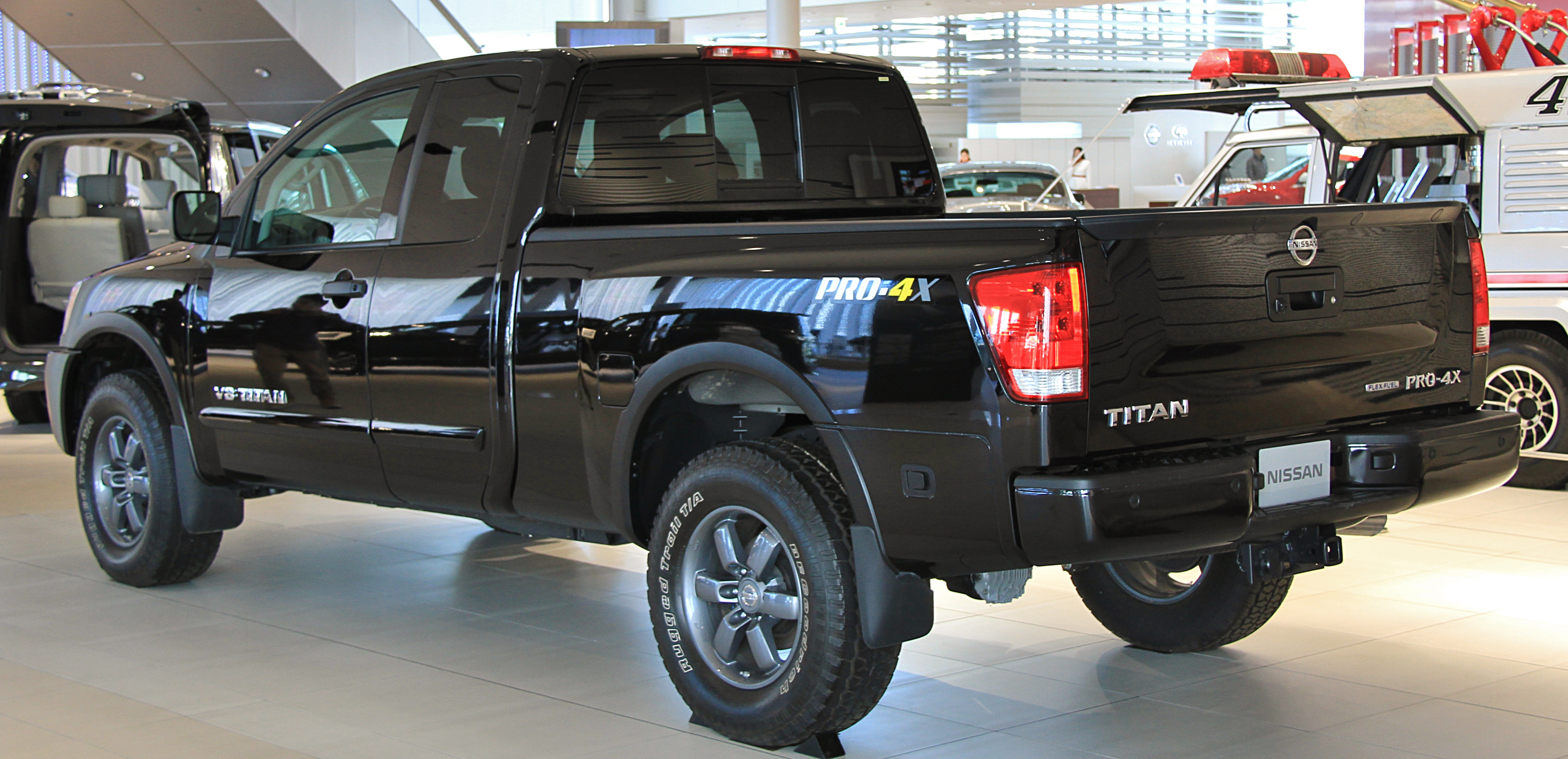
Rear view

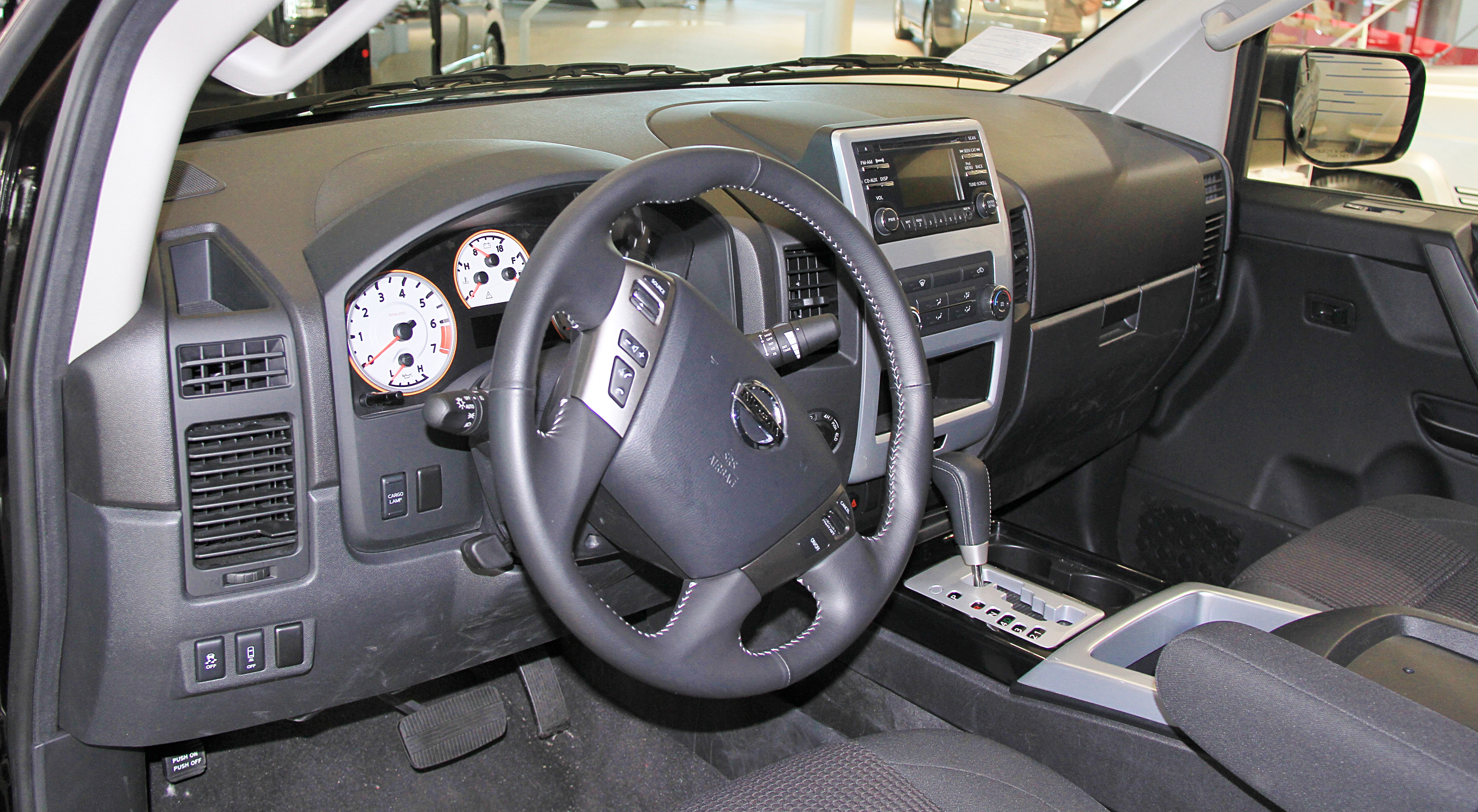
Interior

== Second generation (A61; 2016) ==
Second generation
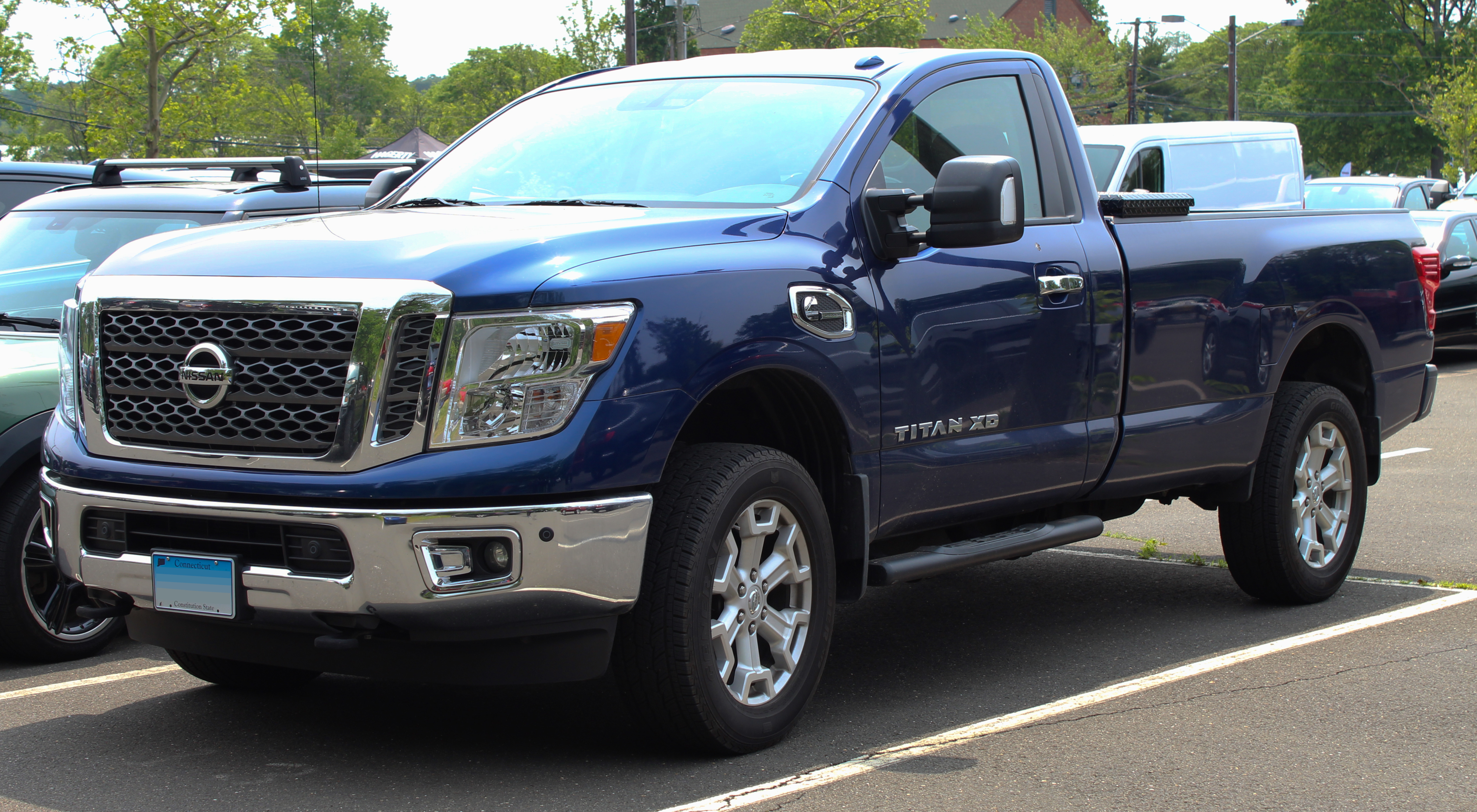
- 2017 Nissan Titan XD (US)

Overview
- Model code: A61
- Production: November 2015–November 2024
- Model years: 2016–2024
- Designer: Randy Rodriguez (exterior: 2012); Diane Allen (2012, 2013); Fred Diaz (executive consultant: 2013)

Body and chassis
- Class: Full-size pickup truck
- Body style: 2-door regular cab (2016–2019); 4-door extended cab; 4-door crew cab
- Related: Nissan NV; Nissan Armada; Nissan Patrol Y62; Infiniti QX56/QX80

Powertrain
- Engine: 5.6 L VK56VD V8; 5.0 L Cummins ISV turbo-diesel V8; (Titan XD, 2016–2019)
- Transmission: 6-speed automatic Aisin A466ND transmission (diesel); 7-speed RE7R01B automatic transmission (gasoline, 2015–2019); 9-speed Jatco JR913E (2020–2024)

Dimensions
- Wheelbase: Standard King Cab/crew cab: 139.8 in (3,551 mm); XD crew cab: 151.6 in (3,851 mm)
- Length: Standard King Cab/crew cab: 228.0–228.9 in (5,791–5,814 mm); XD crew cab: 242.8–243.6 in (6,167–6,187 mm)
- Width: 79.5–80.7 in (2,019–2,050 mm)
- Height: Standard King Cab: 75.1–76.9 in (1,908–1,953 mm); Standard crew cab: 75.4–77.2 in (1,915–1,961 mm); XD crew cab: 78.0–78.9 in (1,981–2,004 mm)

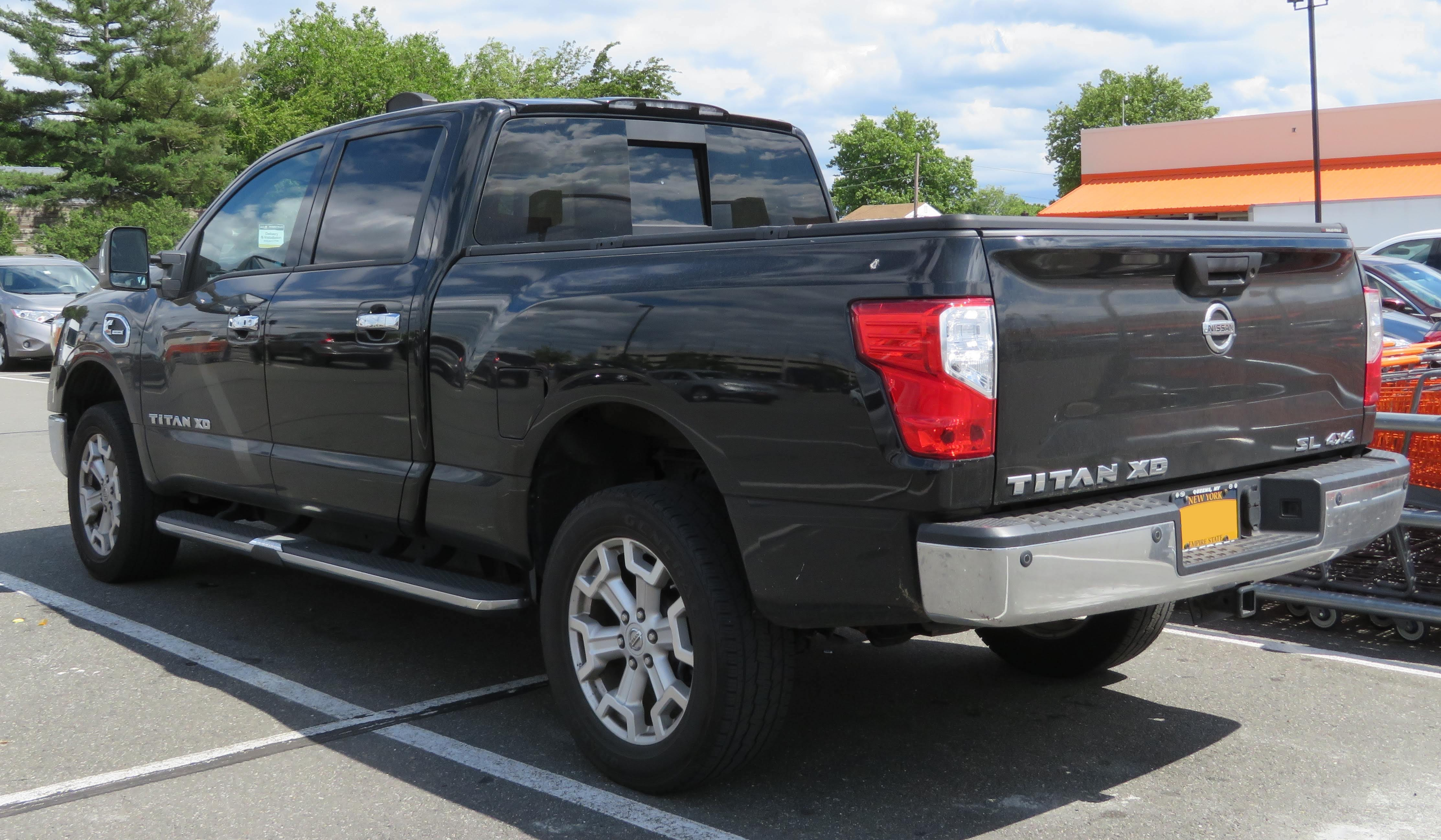
Rear view

The second-generation Titan was to be a lightly reskinned, rebadged version of the Dodge Ram, but those plans fell through with the 2008 worldwide financial crisis.

Nissan unveiled the second generation Titan at the 2015 North American International Auto Show. The company targeted 5 percent market share, or 100,000 annual sales in U.S. Sales reached 21,880 units in 2016.

The standard engine was a 5.6-liter V8 gasoline engine. The engine increased in power compared to the previous model, producing 390 hp (290 kW) and 394 lb⋅ft (534 N⋅m) of torque mated to a seven-speed automatic. Additionally, through the end of 2019, the second-generation Titan offered a 310-horsepower (230 kW) Cummins 5.0-liter turbodiesel V8 that produces almost 555 lb⋅ft (752 N⋅m) of torque. The engine is referred to as the ISV.

The second-generation Titan was available in two forms, regular and XD. The XD version was built on a heavy-duty frame based on Nissan's commercial vehicle line and included the Cummins 5.0L diesel engine as an option until 2019. The chassis platform was shared with the Nissan NV. The Titan XD front and rear differentials are respectively MA235 and MA248(optional electronic locking differential MA248ELD). The standard Titan front and rear differentials are respectively MA210 and M226(optional electronic locking differential M226ELD). The Titan XD steering rack uses a recirculating ball design, unlike the standard Titan's rack and pinion steering rack.

Three different cab styles were offered for the Titan and Titan XD: a two-door regular cab, four-door King (extended) Cab, and four-door crew cab. The four-door crew cab models were the first trucks to debut, followed by the King Cab and regular cab. Trim levels for the Titan and Titan XD were S, SV, Pro-4X (4X4 only), SL, and Platinum Reserve. The regular cab was only available with either S or SV trim levels, while the King Cab was only available with S, SV, or PRO-4X. The crew cab was available with all trim levels.

All Titan and Titan XD models come equipped with standard equipment such as Bluetooth for both hands-free calling and wireless audio streaming via A2DP, air conditioning, keyless entry, power windows and door locks, push-button ignition, and a rearview backup camera system. Options included a touchscreen audio system with GPS navigation (standard equipment for 2019), SiriusXM Satellite Radio, keyless access, an electronically-locking rear tailgate, remote start, alloy wheels, leather-trimmed seating surfaces with heating and ventilation, power front seats, a premium audio system, wood interior trim, a trailer tow package with integrated trailer brake control, and chrome front and rear bumpers and front grille.

For 2019, all Titan and Titan XD models received a new infotainment system as standard equipment, featuring GPS navigation, SiriusXM Satellite Radio, Apple CarPlay and Android Auto smartphone integration, and a seven-inch color touchscreen display, and the optional Rockford-Fosgate premium audio system was replaced with a new Fender premium audio system. This marks the first time a Fender audio system was available on a vehicle from a manufacturer other than Volkswagen.

=== 2020 refresh ===
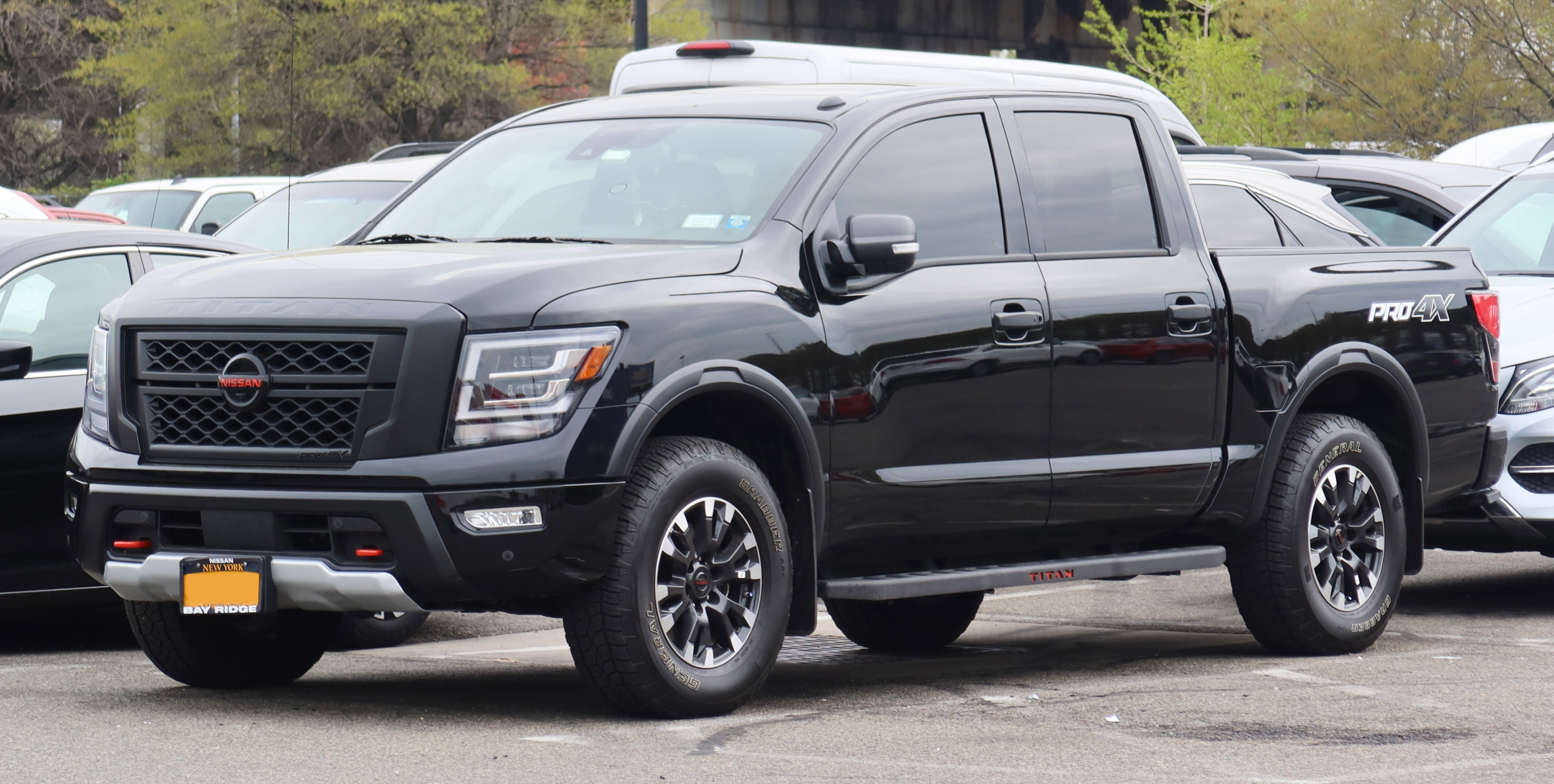

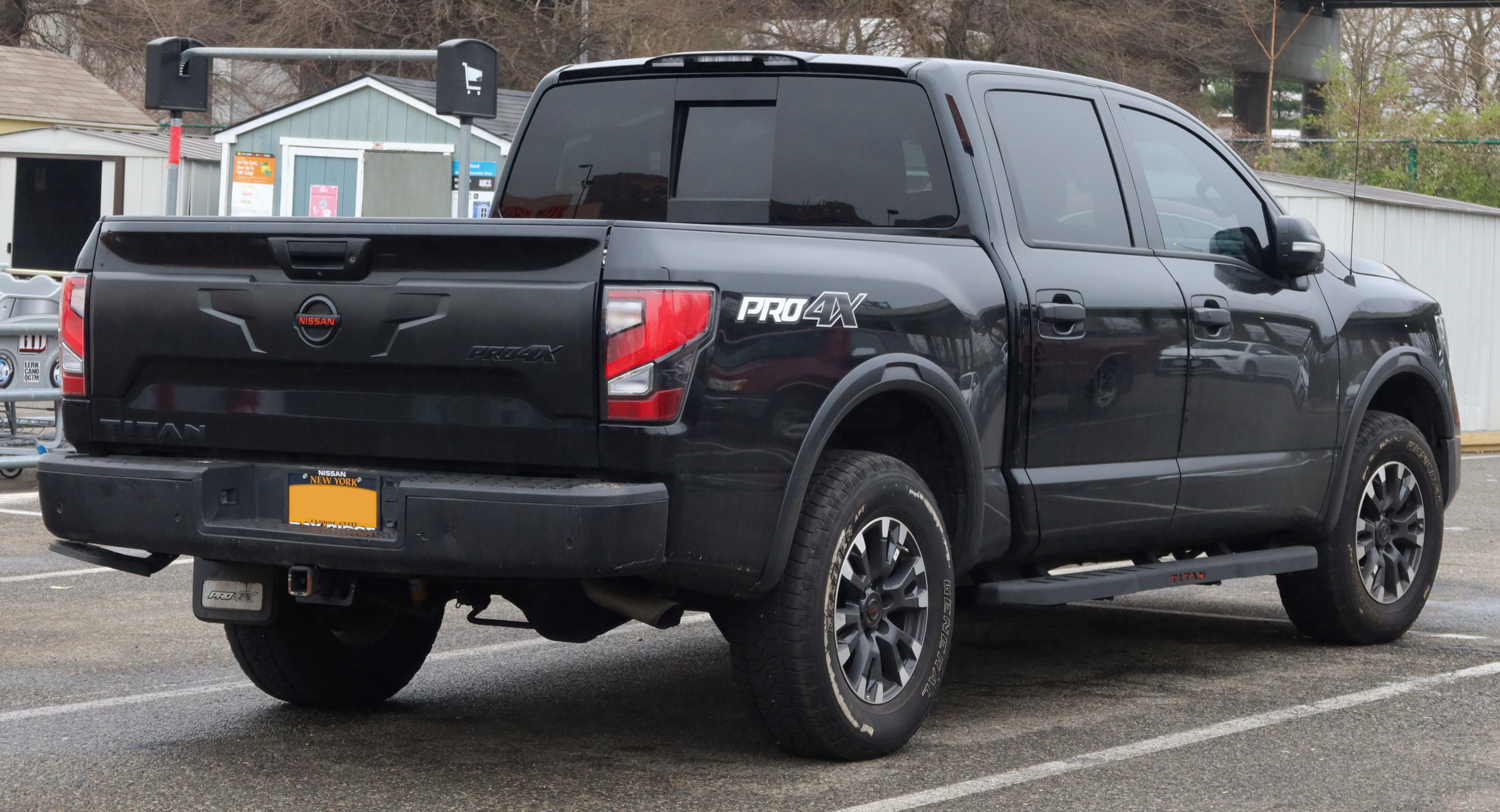
2021 Nissan Titan Pro-4X (US)

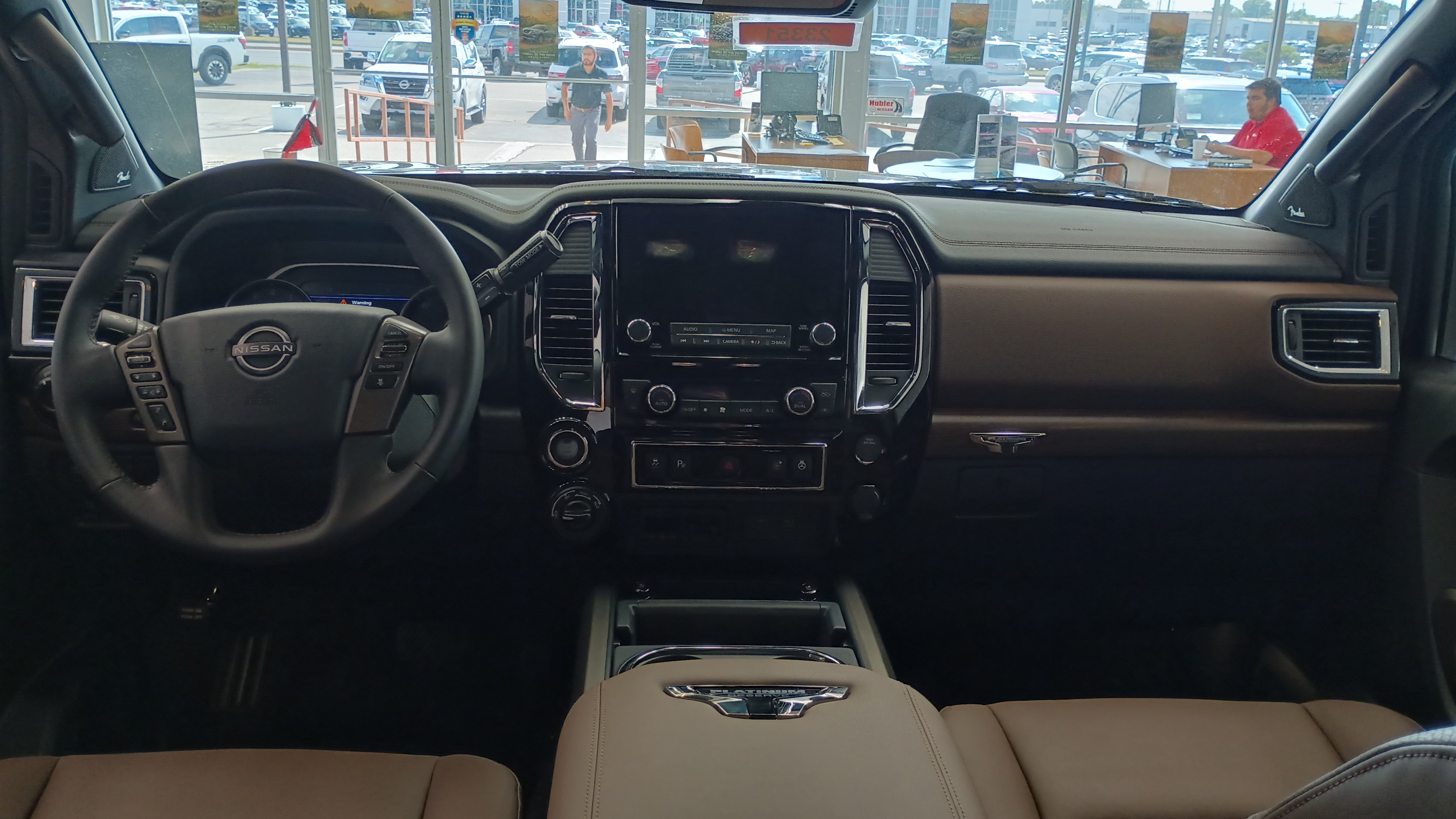
Interior

For 2020, Nissan unveiled a refreshed Titan and Titan XD. For 2020, the regular cab model was dropped from both the standard and XD lines, and King Cab models of the Titan XD were no longer available. The 5.0 L Cummins turbo-diesel V8 engine that was available on the heavier-duty Titan XD was also discontinued, leaving only the 5.6 L "Endurance" gasoline V8. A new nine-speed Jatco automatic transmission replaced the previous seven-speed automatic transmission. New for 2020 Nissan's V8 makes 400 horsepower (300 kW) and 413 pound-feet (560 N⋅m) (up from 390 hp or 290 kW and 394 lb⋅ft or 534 N⋅m.) The axle gear ratio on the standard Titan was also lowered from 2.93:1 ratio to 3.69:1. XD models gear ratio was lowered from 3.69:1 to a larger 4.083:1. New LED headlights were added to the front and rear of upper trims. A new optional 9-inch screen was added with high resolution as well as dual-panel panoramic moon roof. Safety upgrades include 360° safety shield standard which include lane departure warning, high-beam assist, auto emergency braking with pedestrian detection, rear auto braking, blind-spot warning, rear cross-traffic alert, traffic sign detection, and forward collision warning. Optional were intelligent cruise and intelligent driver alertness.

The Titan lineup was discontinued in Canada after the 2021 model year, citing low sales figures as the cause.

In August 2023, Nissan confirmed that the Titan will be discontinued after the 2024 model year due to poor sales compared to the mid-size Frontier. They will be exiting the full-size truck segment to focus on building EV sedans.

== Production ==
In 2019, Nissan reduced production shifts of the Nissan Titan and Frontier pickup trucks from three to two in order to match demand and adjust inventory. About 700 contract workers were affected.

== Sales ==
Calendar year	United States	Canada
2005	86,945	1,679
2006	72,192	2,441
2007	65,743	1,894
2008	34,053	1,520
2009	19,042	1,377
2010	23,416	1,903
2011	21,994	3,103
2012	21,576	3,499
2013	15,691	3,410
2014	12,527	3,022
2015	12,140	3,226
2016	21,880	2,715
2017	52,924	5,692
2018	50,549	5,445
2019	31,514	2,807
2020	26,439	1,218
2021	27,406	414
2022	15,063	22
2023	19,189	1
2024	14,662	0
2025	2,043	3

== See also ==
- Nissan Junior
