= National Notary Association =

American organization for notaries public

- Abbreviation: NNA
- Founded: 1957; 69 years ago
- Founder: Raymond C. Rothman
- Legal status: Mutual benefit corporation
- Purpose: To serve Notaries and their employers throughout the United States by imparting knowledge, building community, and promoting sound professional standards of practice for the benefit and protection of the public.
- Headquarters: Chatsworth, California, U.S.
- Chairman: Milton G. Valera
- President, Chief Executive Officer: Thomas A. Heymann
- Website: www.nationalnotary.org
- Formerly called: California Notary Association

The National Notary Association (NNA) is an American organization at 9350 De Soto Avenue, Chatsworth, California, which provides education to and about notaries public. It is similar to the American Society of Notaries.

== History ==
Originally the California Notary Association, it was established in 1957 by Raymond C. Rothman to support California Notaries Public with educational resources and tools to better perform their roles in society. In 1964, the California Notary Association expanded to become the National Notary Association (NNA). With this expansion came new services including seminars, the telephone hotline and the National Notary Association annual conference.

== Collaboration ==
In 1979, the National Notary Association collaborated with Yale Law School to create the Uniform Notary Act, which became the Model Notary Act when revised in 1984. It was revised again in 2002 and 2010. More than 40 states have adhered their laws to parts of the Model Notary Act. The Uniform Law on Notarial Acts, published by the Uniform Law Commission, provides an alternative to the Model Notary Act.

The National Notary Association is also responsible for the Notary Public Code of Professional Responsibility, which was first published in 1998. The association is sometimes listed as a source of information by state agencies responsible for notaries.

An expert with the association was quoted in a newspaper after a notary was arrested for election fraud by improperly notarizing signatures.

== See also ==
- International Union of Notaries
